= Carlos Alazraqui filmography =

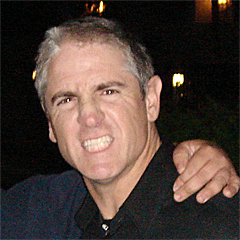
Alazraqui in 2005

Carlos Alazraqui is an American actor who has been featured in various films, television shows, and video games. He is best known for voicing Rocko in Rocko's Modern Life and Mr. Crocker from The Fairly OddParents. He also voiced Spyro in the first Spyro the Dragon video game.

== As actor ==
=== Feature films ===
List of live-action acting performances in feature films
Year	Title	Role	Notes	Source
1998	The Godson	Tony "Flock You" Montana		
1999	Dirt Merchant	Ronny Orlando		
2002	Shteps	Nigel Bell		
2003	Spanish Fly	Enrique		
2004	Soccer Dog: European Cup	Director Blair	Uncredited	
2007	Reno 911! Miami	Deputy James Garcia		
2010	Sex Tax: Based on a True Story	Branson		
2010	The Invited	Charlie Evans		
2011	Randy the Vegetarian Zombie	Tony	Short film; also producer, writer, and director	
2013	I Know That Voice	Himself	Documentary	
2015	Pixels	Tattoo	Uncredited	
2015	The Funhouse Massacre	Bob		
2017	Take the 10	Carlo		
2017	This Is Meg	Tony Eckheart		
2018	Dance Baby Dance	Hector		
2018	Taco Shop	Osvaldo		
2018	Strange Nature	Greg		
2020	Witness Infection	Mr. Serrelli	Also producer and writer; Independent film	
2021	Reno 911! The Hunt for QAnon	Deputy James Garcia		
2023	The Re-Education of Molly Singer	Judge Palmer		

=== Television ===
List of live-action acting performances in television
Year	Series	Role	Notes	Source
1997	Men Behaving Badly	Cab Driver	Episode: "Playing Doctor"	
1999	That '70s Show	Man	Episode: "Hyde Moves In"	
2001	Even Stevens	Dr. Paz	Episode: "Shutterbugged"	
2001	Lizzie McGuire	Host	Episode: "Gordo and the Girl"	
2002	Taina		Episode: "Desperately Seeking Agent"	
2003–09, 2020–22	Reno 911!	Deputy James Garcia	105 episodes	
2004	Combustion	Kenny Barrows	Television film	
2004	I Downloaded a Ghost	Winston Pritchett	Television film	
2005	Drake & Josh	Orajio Hidalgo	Episode: "The Peruvian Puff Pepper"	
2005	Cheap Seats: Without Ron Parker	Rodeo Guy	Episode: "Rodeo"	
2007	Las Vegas	Julio	Episode: "Barechested in the Park"	
2007	Powerloafing	Motivatin' Marty		
2007	State of Mind	Parking Guard		
2007	Pushing Daisies	Gordon McSmalls	Episode: "Girth"	
2008	CSI: Crime Scene Investigation	Officer Brady	Episode: "Let It Bleed"	
2010	I'm in the Band	Barry Roca	2 episodes	
2010	Big Time Rush	Marcos Del Posey	2 episodes	
2012	Clued-Less	Mr. Krooner	Episode: "The Man Who Screwed Too Much"	
2013	Steve Jobs in Making Pad	Steve Jobs	Television film	
2014	Good Morning Today	Marc Duchaine	Episode: "Episode #1.6"	
2014	Married	Carlos	Episode: "The Old Date"	
2014	Santiago	Esteban	Episode: "Episode #1.4"	
2015	Bones	Sammy Tucker	Episode: "The Putter in the Rough"	
2015	Jane the Virgin	Dr. Jorge Pizano Moncada	2 episodes	
2015	Big Time in Hollywood, FL		Episode: "The Hand That Feels"	
2015	The James & Terry Show	Customer at Roger's Bakery #4, Man in Pool	2 episodes	
2015	The League	Papi	Episode: "Adios y Bienvenidos"	
2015–19	Adam Ruins Everything	Detective Nash, King Ferdinand, Washington Irving, Napoleon	6 episodes	
2016	The Crossroads of History	Christopher Columbus	2 episodes	
2016	Kevin Can Wait	Alvarez	Episode: "Pilot"	
2016–17	Dads in Parks	Himself	2 episodes	
2019	Live Parenting	Daryl Sr.	Episode: "Gaming the System"	
2022	The Fairly OddParents: Fairly Odder	Denzel Crocker	Episode: "Fairies Away!"	
2022	The Villains of Valley View	James	Episode: "How the Villains Stole Christmas"	

== As voice actor ==
=== Feature films ===
List of voice performances in feature films
Year	Title	Role	Notes	Source
1991	Beauty and the Beast	Additional voices		
1992	Aladdin	Additional voices		
1995	A Goofy Movie	Additional voices		
1995	Pocahontas	Additional voices		
1996	Space Jam	Additional voices		
1997	Hercules	Additional voices		
1998	A Bug's Life	Loco, Ant		
1999	Toy Story 2	Additional voices		
2001	Osmosis Jones	Spanish germ, additional voices		
2001	Jimmy Neutron: Boy Genius	Harp Estevez		
2001	Monsters, Inc.	Additional voices		
2002	The Powerpuff Girls Movie	Additional voices		
2003	Finding Nemo	Bill		
2004	The Incredibles	Additional voices		
2004	Pokémon: Jirachi, Wish Maker	Additional voices	English Dub	
2004	The SpongeBob SquarePants Movie	Squire, Goofy Goober Announcer, Thief		
2006	Happy Feet	Nestor		
2007	Asterix and the Vikings	Additional voices		English Dub
2008	Space Chimps	Houston		
2008	Ponyo		English dub	
2010	Toy Story 3	Additional voices		
2010	Cats & Dogs: The Revenge of Kitty Galore	Cat Gunner, Cat Spy Analyst		
2011	Happy Feet Two	Nestor		
2012	Delhi Safari	Bajrangi	English dub	
2012	The Lorax	Additional voices		
2013	Monsters University	Additional voices		
2013	Planes	El Chupacabra, Additional voices		
2013	Free Birds	Amos		
2014	The Book of Life	General Posada, Dali, Chuy		
2015	The Spongebob Movie: Sponge Out of Water	Seagull, Dead Parrot		
2015	Inside Out	Helicopter Pilot, Dad's Fear		
2015	Minions	Additional voices		
2015	April and the Extraordinary World	Additional voices	English dub	
2016	The Wild Life	Long John Silver	English dub	
2016	Sing	Additional voices		
2017	Despicable Me 3	Additional voices		
2017	The Emoji Movie	Additional voices		
2017	Gnome Alone			
2018	Charming	King Beauty, Cranky Dwarf, Frazelli the Baker		
2018	The Grinch	Additional voices		
2019	Toy Story 4	Additional voices		
2020	Onward	Additional voices		
2021	America: The Motion Picture	Clyde		
2021	The Loud House Movie	Bell Ringer		
2021	Rumble	Nerdle		
2022	Lightyear	Additional voices		
2022	Beavis and Butt-Head Do the Universe	Flight Specialist Valdivia		
2023	The Super Mario Bros. Movie	Additional voices		
2023	Elemental	Additional voices		
2024	The Casagrandes Movie	Carlos Casagrande, Sergio, Don Tacho		

=== Direct-to-video films ===
List of voice performances in direct-to-video films
Year	Title	Role	Notes	Source
1998	An All Dogs Christmas Carol	Additional voices		
1998	The Lion King II: Simba's Pride	Additional voices		
1998	Pocahontas II: Journey to a New World	Additional voices		
2000	The Life & Adventure of Santa Claus	Wisk, Wil Knook	Credited as Carlos Alazaraqui	
2001	Mickey's Magical Christmas: Snowed in at the House of Mouse	Panchito		
2004	Kangaroo Jack: G'Day U.S.A.!	Dude #1		
2004	¡Mucha Lucha!: The Return of El Maléfico	Rikochet, Mr. Midcarda, Slurf - El Maléfico's Henchmen		
2005	Little People: Discovering the ABC's			
2009	Curious George 2: Follow That Monkey!	Conductor		
2009	The Haunted World of El Superbeasto	Bennie Redriguez		
2010	Justice League: Crisis on Two Earths	Breakdance, Secret Service Agent		
2010	Space Chimps 2: Zartog Strikes Back	Houston, Piddles the Clown, Camera Guy		
2010	Batman: Under the Red Hood	Chi Chi, Thug #1, Baton		
2012	Justice League: Doom	Bane, Terrorist Member		
2012	Batman: The Dark Knight Returns, Part 1	Hernando		
2012	Scooby-Doo! Haunted Holidays	Havros Menkle, Clete the Janitor		
2013	Batman: The Dark Knight Returns, Part 2	Congressman Noches		
2013	Curious George: A Halloween Boo Fest	Mr. Delgado, Luke, Gourds Gregory		
2014	Scooby-Doo! Ghastly Goals	Brazilian Player		
2016	Batman Unlimited: Mechs vs. Mutants	Bane		
2017	Scooby-Doo! Shaggy's Showdown	Larry, Zeke		
2019	Batman vs. Teenage Mutant Ninja Turtles	Bane		
2022	Tom and Jerry: Snowman's Land	Floyd		

=== Animation ===
List of voice performances in animation
Year	Series	Role	Notes	Source
1993–96	Rocko's Modern Life	Rocko, Spunky, Squirmy, Mitch, Captain, Leon, Bucky, Genie, Rabbit, Leslie, Dingo, Roach, Meatball, Judge (2), Boxing Announcer, Eagle, Gordon the Foot, additional voices	Main cast; 52 episodes	
1993–98	Animaniacs	Additional voices		
1994–95	Aladdin	Additional voices		
1995–99	Timon & Pumbaa	Additional voices		
1996	Aaahh!!! Real Monsters	Uno, Chomble	Episode: "Ickis and the Red Zimbo/Oblina and the Three Humans"	
1996	The Mask: Animated Series	Director	Episode: "You Oughta Be in Pictures"	
1996	What a Cartoon!	Casanova	Episode: "The Kitchen Casanova"	
1996–98	All Dogs Go to Heaven: The Series	Spike, Toodles, Jeremy, Otto	4 episodes	
1996–2002	Hey Arnold!	Minion, Eduardo, Carlos, Robbed Man, Sandcastle Judge, Rex's Assistant, Nigel, Man, Frankie G., Chas, Victim #2, Official	5 episodes	
1997	Bruno the Kid	Voices	Episode: "Funworld"	
1997	The Angry Beavers	Squirrel, Gopher	Episode: "A Dam Too Far/Long in the Teeth"	
1997–98	Cow and Chicken	Production Assistant, Jimmy, Bully Twin #1, Sumo Guy, Craig, Beaver #1	4 episodes	
1998	The Lionhearts		8 episodes	
1998–99	The Secret Files of the Spy Dogs	Additional voices	13 episodes	
1998–2000	Men in Black: The Series		3 episodes	
1998–2000	Oh Yeah! Cartoons	Genghis Khan, Dog #1, Ken, Dad, Baby Fib, Employee, Billy, Winston, Fairy Messenger	4 episodes	
1998, 2003	The Powerpuff Girls	Monster, Man #1, Lil' Arturo	2 episodes	
1998–2005	CatDog	Winslow, Lube, Ignatius, Mr. Depot, Nerd Cat, Beach Rat, Newsreel Narrator, Tough Dog #2, Anteater, Roachie, TV Announcer (3), Water Rat, Safety Sammy, Fireman, Winslow's Relatives, Narrator (1), Cop #1, Mouse, Dog #2, Fish, Paul, Hunting Dogs, Paper Boy, Stan, Patron #1, Patron #3, Cow (2), D'arcy, Farburgian Judge, Guest #4, Boy, Bug, Shark, Feeble Guy, Winslow the 38th, Lube Kanoobe, Ticks, Bartholomew, Dad on Coaster, Zeke, Preacher Dog, Naked Cat, Sawnose, Esperanza, Rocky, additional voices	66 episodes	
1999–2000	Crashbox	Harry Houdini, Benjamin Franklin, Richard Nixon, Christopher Columbus, Thomas Edison	5 episodes	
1999–2000	Rayman: The Animated Series	Cookie Levagetto, Admiral Razorbeard	4 episodes	
1999	Rugrats	Additional voices	Episode: "Runaway Reptar Part 1"; uncredited	
1999	Johnny Bravo	Mayor	Episode: "El Bravo Magnifico/Johnny-O and Juliet/Clan of the Cave Boob"	
1999–2000	Detention	Gug	13 episodes	
1999–2004	Rocket Power	Raoul Rodriguez, Uncle #2, Young Clubmember	9 episodes	
1999–present	SpongeBob SquarePants	Scooter, Castle Fish, Loser, Marshmallow Fish, Fireman, Guy at Party #2, Eel, Surfer Fish, Surfer, Vendor #1, Dude Fish, Kevin Fish, Janitor, Guard #1, Prisoner #3, Atomic Flounder, Fish #1, Fish #2, Fish #3, Fish #4, Fish #5, Fish #7, Fish #107, Shark Dad, Late Fish, Photographer, Orderly, Boyfriend, Moat Fish, Band Leader, Short Doctor, Yellow Fish, Sea Bunny, Female Sea Bunny, Little Clown, Ring Master, Head Baker, Zookeeper, Nobby	19 episodes	
1999–present	Family Guy	Mr. Weed, Waiter, Gnome #1, Road Manager, Cheech Marin, MS-13 Member, Chief Justice John Roberts, Brian (in "Phony Montana"), additional voices	14 episodes	
2000–02	The New Woody Woodpecker Show	Woodrow Woodpecker	3 episodes	
2000–01	The Weekenders	Josh, Diego	3 episodes	
2001	The Grim Adventures of Billy & Mandy	Imp #3, Skateboarder	Episode: "Mortal Dilemma/Evil Goes Wild/Get Out of My Head!"	
2001	House of Mouse	Panchito	3 episodes	
2001	CatDog: The Great Parent Mystery	Winslow, Lube	Television film	
2001	King of the Hill	Mexican Police Officer, Mr. Ortiz	Episode: "Lupe's Revenge"	
2001	Jackie Chan Adventures	Inuit Leader	Episode: "Danger in the Deep Freeze"	
2001–02	Time Squad	Comic 1, Dummy, Mahatma Gandhi	2 episodes	
2001–17	The Fairly OddParents	Mr. Crocker, additional voices	Main cast; 132 episodes	
2002	My Life as a Teenage Robot	Ferris Wheel Enthusiast, Man #1, Woman #1	Episode: "Raggedy Android/Class Action"	
2002–05	¡Mucha Lucha!	Rikochet, Mr. Midcarda, additional voices	Main cast; 39 episodes	
2003	Stuart Little	Monty	Episode: "A Little Bit Country"	
2003	What's New, Scooby-Doo?	Roberto Torres, Jaime Herrera, Motor Cross Guy #1, Luis Santiago, Umpire	2 episodes	
2003	Lilo & Stitch: The Series	Ringmaster	Episode: "Elastico"	
2003	Kid Notorious		Episode: "The Nazi Party"	
2003–05	The Proud Family	Puff, Mr. Chips	Recurring	
2004	The Jimmy Timmy Power Hour	Mr. Crocker	Television film	
2004	The Batman	Old Man	Television film	Episode: "The Big Chill"
2004–05	Duck Dodgers	Commandante Hilgalgo, Robot Guard	2 episodes	
2004–05	Maya & Miguel	Paco, additional voices	4 episodes	
2004–05	Stroker & Hoop	Various, Talking Diamond, Magic Shop Owner, Jack Wilson, Mr. Sombrero, Spud	5 episodes	
2004–05	Codename: Kids Next Door	The Kid, Filthy Crew Member, Pedestrian	3 episodes	
2004–08	Camp Lazlo	Lazlo, Clam, Chef McMuesli	Main cast; 61 episodes	
2005	Higglytown Heroes	Animal Shelter Worker Hero	Episode: "Bright Lights, Big City/Kip's Shadow"	
2005	The Proud Family Movie	Puff, Board Member	Television film	
2005–07	The Life and Times of Juniper Lee	Monroe, Michael Lee, Fish, Kordoth, Mitch, Clown, Helper Elf, Tiny Giant, Cordoth the Conqueror, additional characters	40 episodes	
2006	The Jimmy Timmy Power Hour 2: When Nerds Collide	Mr. Crocker	Television film	
2006	The Fairly OddParents in Fairy Idol	Mr. Crocker, Juandissimo Magnifico, Mayor	Television film	
2006	Minoriteam	El Yo	3 episodes	
2006	The Jimmy Timmy Power Hour 3: The Jerkinators!	Mr. Crocker, Mayor	Television film	
2006	Celebrity Deathmatch	Horatio Sanz	Episode: "When Animals Attack"	
2006–07	Shorty McShorts' Shorts	Monte Cosmo, Scoops	2 episodes	
2006–07	Squirrel Boy	Salty Mike, Mr. Runion, Wisened Old Store Employee, Argyll, additional characters	10 episodes	
2006–07	Avatar: The Last Airbender	Due, Tho, additional voices	2 episodes	
2006–09	The Replacements	Rodrigo Taratinus, Mr. Oz, Professor Sneedley, Hakobo's Dad	10 episodes	
2006–10	Wow! Wow! Wubbzy!	Walden, Earl, Chef Fritz, Curator, Zookeeper	Main cast; 52 episodes	
2006–12	Handy Manny	Felipe 'the Phillips Screwdriver', Chief Eduardo, Abuelito	Main cast; 84 episodes	
2007	Random! Cartoons	Quiggims, Bobblehead	Episode: "Dugly Uckling's Treasure Quest"	
2007	Saul of the Mole Men	Stromulus Guandor, Birdbat Leader	10 episodes	
2007	Avatar: Super Deformed Shorts	Tho, Due	Episode: "Swamp Skiin' Throwdown"	
2007	Tom and Jerry Tales	Casper Lombardo	Episode: "Don't Bring Your Pet to School Day/Cat Show Catastrophe/The Cat Whisperer"	
2007	Ben 10: Race Against Time	Grey Matter	Television film	
2007–08	Out of Jimmy's Head	Golly Gopher, Pigeon, Memory #1, Officer Akita	14 episodes	
2007–08	El Tigre: The Adventures of Manny Rivera	Granpapi Rivera, Puma Loco, Senor Chappi, Vice Principal Chakal, Lady Gobbler, Humberto, Guero, Officer Oscar, Tiny, Supermarket Employee, Bandido (2), Policeman (2), Zebra Donkey, El Tarantula, Plumber, Jorge, Vendor, Ninja Monster, Uno, Lupito, Security Guard, Officer #3, Donkey, Deaduardo, Sensitive Bandido, History Teacher, Father, Ticket Vendor, Science Teacher, Sean	42 episodes	
2007–12	Curious George	Mr. Zoobel, Man on Truck, The Salesman, The Watchman, Luke, The Announcer, Wall Street Man, Janitor, Recycling Center Man, Mr. Lixo	12 episodes	
2008	Wubbzy's Big Movie!	Walden, Earl, additional characters	Television film	
2008–10	Chowder	Carlito Con Questo, Gazelle, Narrator, Dr. Jalapeño Plepper, Doozie, Goulash Coach, Ref, Bird Player, Dancing Diablo, Dragon #1, Souffle	4 episodes	
2008–13	Phineas and Ferb	Bobby, Morg, Bobbi Fabulous, Dr. Feelbetter, additional voices	10 episodes	
2008–14	The Boondocks	Illegal Immigrant	3 episodes	
2009	Wow! Wow! Wubbzy!: Wubb Idol	Walden, Chef Fritz, Zookeeper, additional voices	Television film	
2009	The Goode Family	Miguel	Episode: "Helen's Back"	
2009–10	Back at the Barnyard	Rodeo Announcer, Llama #1, Llama #3	2 episodes	
2009–11	The Super Hero Squad Show	Ringmaster, Adult Reptil, Cyclops, Captain Australia, Plantman	3 episodes	
2010	Kick Buttowski: Suburban Daredevil	Sanchez	Episode: "Drop Kick/Box Office Blitz"	
2010	Fish Hooks	Mr. Caliente, Newscaster	Episode: "Hooray for Hamsterwood"	
2010–11	Planet Sheen	Emcee, Blurg #2, Zeenuian #3, Vendor, Hat Monger, Mustache Monger	2 episodes	
2010–11	T.U.F.F. Puppy	Stink Bug, Announcer, Military Announcer #1	2 episodes	
2010–12	Scooby-Doo! Mystery Incorporated	Ernesto, Krampus, Punk Kid, Prisoner #1, Piranha-Goat, Deputy Bucky, Nitro Wleinski, Crew Member, Todd	4 episodes	
2010–13	Generator Rex	Male Providence Cadet #1, DI Hutton, Lecturer, Dos, Providence Agent (4), Lansky, Old Man, Uniformed Providence Agent, Reynaldo, Judge	5 episodes	
2011	Frog in a Suit	Sgt. Spittle, Horny	2 episodes	
2011	G.I. Joe: Renegades	Hector Delgado, Shipwreck, Guard #2, Radio Voice	Episode: "Shipwrecked"	
2011	The Looney Tunes Show	Backup Singer	Episode: "Casa de Calma"	
2011	Black Dynamite	Pilot	Episode: "The Pilot"	
2011–12	Dan Vs.	Cashier, General Store Clerk, X-5, Flynn Goodhill, Doctor, Maurice, Surfer #2, Lifeguard, Balloonist Cult Member	12 episodes	
2011–16	Minnie's Bow-Toons	Panchito Pistoles	40 episodes	
2011–16	Regular Show	Additional voices	40 episodes	
2012	Special Agent Oso	Felipe 'the Phillips Screwdriver'	Episode: "The Manny with the Golden Bear"	
2012	Vibe	Vibe	2 episodes	
2012	Sword of the Atom	Soldier, Hawkman	3 episodes	
2012	Motorcity	Bracket, Trooper #2, Ultra Elite	2 episodes	
2012–13	Plastic Man	Tuxedo, Gangster #2, Man in Crowd, Flatscreen	4 episodes	
2012–14	The Legend of Korra	Tonraq, Anti-Bending Protestor, Chow, Yung, Otaku, Ruffled Police Officer, Train Guard, Mako & Bolin's Uncle, Earth Kingdom Guard, Air Bison Rustler, Royal Guard Turned Looter, Zaofu Radio Operator	5 episodes	
2013	Beware the Batman	Junkyard Dog	Episode: "Tests"	
2013	Pound Puppies	Stuffy, Solo, Peppy, Cat #2, Antonio, Venezuelan Agent Dog #2	4 episodes	
2013–14	Brickleberry	Rich Skymall III, McGill, Not-So-Fast, Warden Tiny Smalls	4 episodes	
2013–14	Ben 10: Omniverse	Rad Dudesman, Pyxi, Scout, Old Woman, additional voices	4 episodes	
2013–15	Randy Cunningham: 9th Grade Ninja	Dave, Franz Nukid	9 episodes	
2013–15	Sofia the First	King Magnus, Gnarlie, Ralph the Swan, Barker, additional voices	6 episodes	
2014	Chozen		5 episodes	
2014, 2016	Mixels	Torts, Mesmo	2 episodes	
2014–16	Sheriff Callie's Wild West	Tio Tortuga, Baxter Badger, Red Bandit, Mean McGee, Train Engineer	24 episodes	
2014–16	TripTank	Miner, Silverback, Gorilla #4, Gangster, Ele Jefe, Henchman #1 (1), Rider #1, English Guy, Scottish Dude, Hector, Prisoner #1, Farmer, Businessman in Elevator, John with Fortune Cookie, Tourist Held Hostage, Teardrop, Ramon	11 episodes	
2015	Half Like Me	Speedy Gonzales	Television film	
2015	Archer	Mario Sevino, Guard	3 episodes	
2015	Batman Unlimited	Bane	Episode: "Bane Packs a Punch"	
2015	Moonbeam City	Razor, Jericho, Helix Salazito	2 episodes	
2015–16	Uncle Grandpa	Thiago, additional voices	5 episodes	
2015–18	The Adventures of Puss in Boots	Mayor Temeroso, Raul, Thieves, Masked Thief #1, Masked Thief #3, Theveneau, Scimitar, Phillip, Julio, Puss Coughs A Lot, Catchphrase Puss, Skeleton Puss	26 episodes	
2015–20	New Looney Tunes	Elliot, Leslie P. Lilylegs, Tad Tucker, Montygrabs, Rick, Shameless O'Scanty, Queen, Opponent, Scarecrow	25 episodes	
2016	The Mr. Peabody & Sherman Show	Ponce de Leon	Episode: "Peabody's Diet/Ponce de Leon"	
2016	Transformers: Robots in Disguise	Hammer, Anvil, Nigel	Episode: "Bumblebee's Night Off"	
2016	Bordertown	Placido, El Coyote	12 episodes	
2016	Ben 10	Jock 1, Minitaur, Chinzilla	Episode: "Animo Farm"	
2016–18	Milo Murphy's Law	Basil, additional voices	3 episodes	
2016–20	Elena of Avalor	Skylar, additional voices	33 episodes	
2016–20	The Loud House	Carlos, Sergio, Vito, Customer, Band Leader, Giovanni, Waiter (1), Conductor, Cherry Farmer, Bus Driver (3), Waiter (2), Ad Voice, Gravybot, El Falcon	15 episodes	
2017	Jeff & Some Aliens	Doctor, Federico, Stalker, Fan #1, Lawyer, Angry Audience Member, Garbageman, Jose, Young Dad	5 episodes	
2017	Ginger Snaps	Principal Kroll	10 episodes	
2017	The Powerpuff Girls	Javier Xavier, additional voices	Episode: "Spider Sense"	
2017	Pickle and Peanut	El Diablo	Episode: "Fast Food Pirates" (uncredited)	
2017	Legends of Chamberlain Heights		Episode: "Legends of Lock Up"	
2017	Hey Arnold!: The Jungle Movie	Eduardo	Television film	
2017	DuckTales	Salesman, Tourist, Hot Tubber	Episode: "The Impossible Summit of Mt. Neverrest!"	
2017–18	Bunsen Is a Beast	The Snarcher, The Do-Not, Male Beast, Mr. Crocker, Snapping Toilet, Troll 1, Pass, Cat	5 episodes	
2017–18	Clarence	Mr. Mozer, Dunkin, Sensei Carlos, Young Mozer, Audio Book Narrator	3 episodes	
2017–18	Mickey Mouse Mixed-Up Adventures	Panchito	2 episodes	
2017, 2019	Big Mouth	Gustavo	2 episodes	
2017–20	Talking Tom & Friends	Ricky DeLuna	4 episodes	
2017–21	Vampirina	Dr. Piquette, Mouth, Brocknar, Harry Pumpkin	5 episodes	
2018	Elena of Avalor: Scepter Training with Zuzo	Skylar	Episode: "Don't Be Our Guest"	
2018	The Adventures of Kid Danger	Slacker Dude, Goon #1, Automated Voice, Scotty Yomoto, Oscar, Carnival Barker, David Lee Roth, Kids	3 episodes	
2018	Spirit Riding Free	Rusty, Pablo, Buyer	2 episodes	
2019	Pinky Malinky	Large Biker Guy, Captain Gus, Greg, Kyle, Bill	2 episodes	
2019	Love, Death & Robots	Sui	Episode: "Blind Spot"	
2019	Rocko's Modern Life: Static Cling	Rocko, Spunky, Leon, Gordon the Foot, Mitch, Bun Master	Television film	
2019	Middle School Moguls	Mr. Olivas, Grandpa Siggy, Mr. Cornwald	2 episodes	
2019–20	The Rocketeer	Malcolm, Pet Shop Owner	5 episodes	
2019–20	American Dad!	Sebastian Hub, Columbian Villager, Country Bumpkin, Camp Overseer, Dino	4 episodes	
2019–22	Dragons: Rescue Riders	Duggard, Sizzle, Lurke, Waldondo, Svengard	24 episodes	
2019–22	Puppy Dog Pals	Driver, Flight Attendant, Shamrock, Employee #1, Sir Trevor, Jester, Hangry, Marley, Kiwi Dad, Cockatoo, Parrot, Stable master, silvio	5 episodes	
2019–22	The Casagrandes	Sergio, Vito, Carlos, Buttercup, Dog Catcher, Skater Ghost, Documentary Narrator, Date #2, Breakfast Bot, Movie Character, Pirate Dinner Theatre Announcer, Sign-Spinning Employee	30 episodes	
2020	Glitch Techs	Game Announcer, Spanish TV Announcer	Episode: "Tutorial Mode"	
2020	Duncanville	El Espantoso	Episode: "Free Range Children"	
2020	Kipo and the Age of Wonderbeasts	Zane, Earl, Father, Nerdy Human	11 episodes	
2020–22	DreamWorks Dragons: Rescue Riders	Duggard	Recurring	
2020–21	Animaniacs	Tuck Buckerson, Mexican Commentator, Venezuelan Host, Conductor, Moose, Ed, Grandson, John, Nicolás Maduro	6 episodes	
2021	Looney Tunes Cartoons	Leprechaun, Cop, Bus Driver	2 episodes	
2021	Fast & Furious Spy Racers	El Mariposa, Curator	Episode: "That's a Moray"	
2021	Trese	Anton Trese, Santelmo / Senor Armanaz, Police Officer #1, Aswang Market Guard #7, Angry Mob, Dock Worker #2		
2021	Centaurworld	Additional voices	Episode: "Johnny Teatime's Be Best Competition: A Quest for the Sash"	
2021	Lego City Adventures	Rocket Racer		
2021	Saturday Morning All Star Hits!	Papa Meep, JJ Henders, additional voices		
2021–24	Kamp Koral: SpongeBob's Under Years	Nobby, Harvey, Sea Bunny, Kid #1, Camper #1	13 episodes	
2021–24	Monsters at Work	Rudy the Service Monster, David, Josh Rivera, additional voices		
2021–25	Solar Opposites	Montez, additional voices	13 episodes	
2022–26	The Proud Family: Louder and Prouder	Puff, Mr. Chips, additional voices	Recurring	
2022	Farzar	Zobo/Sal/various		
2022	The Cuphead Show!	Additional voices		
2022	Beavis and Butt-Head	Alonzo, Juror # 2	Episode: "Two Stupid Men/Freaky Friday"	
2022	The Wonderful World of Mickey Mouse	Louie the Mountain Lion		
2022	Slippin' Jimmy	Cheech, Comic Store Worker	Episode: "After Bedtime"	
2022	Star Trek: Lower Decks	Vice-Admiral Les Buenamigo, USS Aledo computer	5 episodes	
2022	Cars on the Road	Additional voices		
2023	Oddballs	Additional voices	Episode: "Toasty's Goodbye"	
2024–26	Rock Paper Scissors	Scissors		
2024	The Fairly OddParents: A New Wish	Mr. Jorge Guzman, Stuart and Hannibal, Denzel Crocker	Returning and recurring role	
2024	Exploding Kittens	Additional voices		
2026	Rick and Morty	MIT Director	Episode: "Field of Dreams"	
2026	Helluva Boss	Additional Voices	Episode: "Bad Repulation"	

=== Video games ===
List of voice performances in video games
Year	Title	Role	Notes	Source
1994	Rocko's Modern Life: Spunky's Dangerous Day	Rocko	Uncredited	
1996	Soviet Strike	President Clinton		
1996	Nickelodeon 3D Movie Maker	Rocko, Spunky		
1996	Top Gun: Fire at Will	Tomcat, Ivan		
1996	Shattered Steel	Voices		
1997	Star Warped	Voices		
1998	Spyro the Dragon	Spyro the Dragon, additional dragons		
2001	Star Wars: Starfighter	Pirate Cargo Captain, Mercenary Wingman, Rescue 1		
2001	Monsters, Inc.	Mike Wazowski		
2001	Monsters, Inc. Scream Team	Mike Wazowski		
2001	Monsters, Inc. Wreck Room Arcade	Mike Wazowski		
2001	Monsters, Inc. Scare Island	Mike Wazowski		
2001	Maximo: Ghosts to Glory	Grim Reaper, Bakar La Bas, The General	Credited as Carlos Alzraqui	
2002	Bruce Lee: Quest of the Dragon	Additional voices		
2002	Mike's Monstrous Adventure	Mike Wazowski		
2002	Monsters, Inc. Scream Arena	Mike Wazowski, Pauley		
2003	Arc the Lad: Twilight of the Spirits	Darc		
2003	Secret Weapons Over Normandy	Mack	Credited as Caslos Alazraqui	
2003	Fairly OddParents: Breakin' da Rules	Mr. Crocker, Mayor of Dimmsdale, Juandissimo Magnifico, Country Boy, Le Foot		
2004	The Bard's Tale			
2004	GoldenEye: Rogue Agent	Dr. Julius No		
2005	Nicktoons Unite!	Mr. Crocker		
2006	Titan Quest			
2006	Saints Row	Radio Voice		
2006	Open Season	Gordy, Squirrel		
2006	Justice League Heroes	The Key		
2006	The Sopranos: Road to Respect			
2006	Happy Feet	Nestor		
2006	Flushed Away			
2007	Nicktoons: Attack of the Toybots	Rocko		
2007	Avatar: The Last Airbender – The Burning Earth	Additional voices		
2007	Cars Mater-National	Mike Wazowski Car		
2008	Crash: Mind over Mutant	Additional voices		
2009	Call of Juarez: Bound in Blood	William McCall		
2009	Cars Race-O-Rama	Mike Wazowski Car		
2010	Supreme Commander 2			
2011	Spider-Man: Edge of Time			
2011	Batman: Arkham City	G.C.P.D. Officer Sanchez, Political Prisoner	Credited as Carlos Alazarqui	
2011	Kinect: Disneyland Adventures			
2011	Happy Feet Two	Ramon		
2012	Rush: A Disney-Pixar Adventure	Francesco Bernoulli	English dub	
2012	World of Warcraft: Mists of Pandaria			
2012	Skylanders: Giants	Hot Dog		
2013	Marvel Heroes	Forge	Credited as Carlos Alazragui	
2013	Planes	El Chupacabra		
2013	Disney Infinity	Mike Wazowski, Francesco Bernoulli		
2013	Teenage Mutant Ninja Turtles: Out of the Shadows	Raphael		
2013	Skylanders: Swap Force	Duff, Hot Dog		
2013	Batman: Arkham Origins	Bane Mercenary		
2014	Disney Infinity: Marvel Super Heroes	Cosmo the Space Dog, Mike Wazowski, Francesco Bernoulli		
2014	Skylanders: Trap Team	Hot Dog, additional voices		
2015	Lego Jurassic World			
2015	Batman: Arkham Knight			
2015	Disney Infinity 3.0	Mike Wazowski, Francesco Bernoulli		
2015	Skylanders: SuperChargers	Hot Dog, Fiesta		
2019	Kingdom Hearts III	Mike Wazowski		
2022	Nickelodeon Extreme Tennis	Rocko		
2022	Nickelodeon All-Star Brawl	Rocko		
2022	Nickelodeon Kart Racers 3: Slime Speedway	Rocko		
2023	Nickelodeon All-Star Brawl 2	Rocko		
2023	Disney Speedstorm	Mike Wazowski		
2025	Dune Awakening	Cassini Brava		
