= Wubbzy's Big Movie! =

2008 American animated film

- DVD art work
- Based on: Wow! Wow! Wubbzy! by Bob Boyle
- Written by: Bob Boyle; Victor Bumbalo; Suzanne Collins; Ross Hastings; Raye Lankford; Ray Shenusay; Frederick Stroppel
- Directed by: James Burks; Steve Daye; Brian Hogan; Frank Rocco; Patty Shinagawa
- Starring: Grey DeLisle; Lara Jill Miller; Tara Strong; Carlos Alazraqui
- Music by: Mike Reagan
- Country of origin: United States
- Original language: English

Production
- Producers: Andi Rodriguez; Andrea Romero
- Editors: Mechele Boyett; Bill Charnega
- Running time: 76 minutes
- Production companies: Bolder Media; Starz Media

Original release
- Network: Starz Kids & Family
- Release: August 29, 2008

Wubbzy's Big Movie! is a 2008 American animated comedy anthology film based on the Wow! Wow! Wubbzy! television series. It premiered on the Starz Kids & Family channel on August 29, 2008. The film was produced by Starz Media and Bolder Media in association with Film Roman and distributed by Starz Distribution.

In addition to some new animation, the film uses several previous episodes of Wow! Wow! Wubbzy! that play out as flashbacks.

== Plot ==
Wubbzy, Walden and Widget are spending the day together in Wuzzleburg. They then decide to get some Doodleberry pie. However, Wubbzy trips over a rock and tumbles down a hill, hitting his head several times. This causes Wubbzy to forget who he is, his friends, and moo like a cow. When Widget and Walden take Wubbzy to see Dr. Flooey, he tells them that Wubbzy has "knockity-noggin" (similar to amnesia) and suggests that they share with Wubbzy memories of the trio. The two try several attempts to help Wubbzy recover his memory, which includes Walden showing him a scrapbook of photos of them, and Widget building an invention called "the Remember-When 3000" so that Wubbzy instantly remembers who he is. However, all these attempts fail.

The film also acts as a compilation of several Wow! Wow! Wubbzy! episodes from the first season, which play out as flashbacks to help Wubbzy remember who he is. The episodes include "A Tale of Tails", "Pirate Treasure", "Come Spy with Me", "Perfecto Party", and "Monster Madness". According to Dr. Flooey, the film takes place a week after the events of the episode "The Tired Tail", in which he tells Wubbzy that he hurt his tail last week. The episode "Puddle Muddle" plays before the actual plot begins, and an animated music video for the song "That's What Friends Are For" is also featured.

Near the end of the film, Wubbzy still cannot remember anything. Widget decides to use the Remember-When 3000 again, but it launches Wubbzy right out of the workshop and tumbles down a hill again. Once they get to him, Widget and Walden discover that Wubbzy has finally regained his memories, and the trio go to get some Doodleberry pie to celebrate. Wubbzy momentarily moos like a cow again, but says he was kidding, and they laugh about it, ending the film.

== Voice cast ==
- Grey DeLisle as Wubbzy, Buggy and Kooky Kid
- Lara Jill Miller as Widget, Huggy and Old Lady Zamboni
- Tara Strong as Ball Kid #2, Jumping Kid #1, Jumping Kid #2 and Swinging Kid #1
- Carlos Alazraqui as Walden, Earl, Ball Kid #1, Photographer and Dr. Flooey

== Reception ==
Catherine Dawson March, writing for The Globe and Mail, called the film "a bit of a rip" and commented that Wubbzy's temporary memory loss would be shocking for young viewers. The Dove Foundation reviewed it positively, praising its plot, animation, music, and theme of friendship, and awarding the film its "Dove 'Family-Approved' Seal".

== Sequel ==
A sequel, Wubb Idol, was released direct-to-TV on May 1, 2009. The film features the voice of Beyoncé.
