= List of Wow! Wow! Wubbzy! episodes =

Wow! Wow! Wubbzy! is an American animated television series created by Bob Boyle. It ran for a total of 52 episodes over two seasons. Each episode includes a short and a music video. In addition to the regular episodes, a TV movie called Wubbzy's Big Movie! premiered on Starz Kids & Family on August 29, 2008, followed by a sequel on May 1, 2009.

== Series overview ==
Season	Segments	Episodes	Originally released	
Season	Segments	Episodes	First released	Last released
1	52	26	August 21, 2006	June 20, 2008
Specials	N/A	2	August 29, 2008	May 1, 2009
2	52	26	September 2, 2008	February 21, 2010

== Episodes ==
=== Season 1 (2006–08) ===
No. overall	No. in season	Title	Directed by	Written by	Storyboard by	Original release date	Prod. code
1a	1a	"A Tale of Tails"	Brian Hogan	Bob Boyle	Bob Boyle	August 21, 2006	101a
Everyone refuses to play with Wubbzy because of his long and bendy tail, so he gets help from his friends. Short: "Flutterflies" Guest star: Tara Strong as Ball Kid #2, Swinging Kid #1 and Swinging Kid #2
1b	1b	"Special Delivery"	Brian Hogan	Frederick Stroppel	Karl Toerge	August 21, 2006	101b
Wubbzy opens a package that belongs to Walden. Song: "Look, Don't Touch"
2a	2a	"Widget's Wild Ride"	Brian Hogan	Frederick Stroppel	Mike Sosnowski and Bob Boyle	August 28, 2006	104a
Widget fixes Wubbzy's vehicle for the Wuzzleburg road racer rally, but her imagination runs wild. Short: "Hide and Seek"
2b	2b	"Attack of the 50-Foot Fleegle"	Brian Hogan	Ray Shenusay & Victor Bumbalo	Steve Daye	August 28, 2006	104b
Wubbzy adopts a pet and names it Tiny. But Wubbzy, thinking he's already responsible enough to take care of it, feeds Tiny candy, causing him to grow into a giant. Song: "Pet Party"
3a	3a	"Wubbzy in the Woods"	Brian Hogan	Frederick Stroppel	Karl Toerge	August 29, 2006	102a
Wubbzy gets lost during a camping trip. Short: "Feed the Birds"
3b	3b	"A Little Help from Your Friends"	Brian Hogan	Story by : Bob Boyle; Written by : Ford Riley	Bill Thyen and Bob Boyle	August 29, 2006	102b
Wubbzy is tired of everyone always helping him. Song: "A Little Help"
4a	4a	"Goo Goo Grief!"	Brian Hogan	Story by : Bob Boyle; Written by : Cliff MacGillivray & Kelly Ward	Jim Schumann	August 30, 2006	103a
Walden finds a creature on his lawn and helps it find its family. Short: "Walden's Minute of Knowledge"
4b	4b	"Perfecto Party"	Brian Hogan	Ray Shenusay & Victor Bumbalo	Steve Daye	August 30, 2006	103b
Walden, wanting Wubbzy to have the best birthday party ever, makes a marshmallow lasagna. Song: "Perfect Day"
5a	5a	"A Clean Sweep"	Brian Hogan	Story by : Bob Boyle; Written by : Cliff MacGillivray & Kelly Ward	Kevin Frank	August 31, 2006	105a
Wubbzy has a lot of chores to do, but when he gets a brand new Kickety-Kick Ball, he puts off his chores while he plays. Before he knows it, his house is a mess and his lawn is a jungle. Short: "Go Fly a Kite"
5b	5b	"Mr. Cool"	Brian Hogan	Frederick Stroppel	Bill Thyen and Bob Boyle	August 31, 2006	105b
The Wuzzleburg Boogie Bash is coming and only the coolest people will attend it, so Wubbzy and Widget teach Walden how to be cool. Song: "Mr. Cool"
6a	6a	"Gotta Dance"	Brian Hogan	Frederick Stroppel	Carol Lay	September 5, 2006	106a
Widget wants to be a ballerina but she's not that good, so she cheats by building a machine called "the Dancy Pants 3000", to help her dance. Short: "The Wubbzy Wiggle" Song: "The Wubbzy Wiggle"
6b	6b	"The Wubb Club"	Brian Hogan	Ross Hastings	Elaine Hultgren and Bob Boyle	September 5, 2006	106b
Wubbzy creates a club and soon, Widget and Walden build a huge clubhouse for it. Song: "Imagine"
7a	7a	"The Wuzzleburg Express"	Brian Hogan	Frederick Stroppel	Steve Daye	September 6, 2006	107a
Wubbzy's friends are going on a picnic at Mount Zubba Bubba. Unfortunately, when the train goes berserk on the way to the mountain, Widget tries to make the Wuzzleburg Express work again. Short: "No Laughing Contest"
7b	7b	"Gidget the Super Robot"	Brian Hogan	Jill Cozza	Bob Boyle and Bill Thyen	September 6, 2006	107b
Widget builds a robot clone of herself named Gidget, but Wubbzy and Walden start spending more time with Gidget, making Widget feel left out. Song: "That's What Friends are For"
8a	8a	"Eggs Over Easy"	Brian Hogan	Suzanne Collins	Kevin Frank	September 7, 2006	108a
Widget offers to help Wubbzy decorate eggs for an Easter egg hunt, but thinking it takes too long, builds an egg-making machine that can also find eggs. Short: "Bigfoot"
8b	8b	"The Flight of the Flutterfly"	Brian Hogan	Ross Hastings	Carol Lay	September 7, 2006	108b
Wubbzy wants to keep a flutterfly, which he names Norm. So Widget builds a house for it, but Norm is unhappy. Song: "You Gotta Be Free"
9a	9a	"Warp Speed Wubbzy!"	Brian Hogan	Frederick Stroppel	Mike Sosnowski and Steve Daye	October 17, 2006	109a
Walden sees a glowing light through his telescope, and thinks spacemen are coming to Wuzzleburg. But when Wubbzy and Widget discover that it was just a glow fly on top of the telescope and Walden starts telling everyone about the spaceship, they decide to dress up as spacemen. Short: "I Can See Clearly Now"
9b	9b	"Wubbzy the Star"	Brian Hogan	Joe Streich	Bill Thyen and Bob Boyle	October 17, 2006	109b
Wubbzy wants to play the lead role in Walden's play, but his voice isn't loud enough. Song: "You're a Star"
10a	10a	"Who Needs School?"	Brian Hogan	Frederick Stroppel	Kevin Frank	October 19, 2006	111a
Wubbzy is nervous about his first day of school, after being convinced by his friends, Buggy, Huggy, and Earl, that it is scary. Short: "Trampoline"
10b	10b	"Magic Tricks"	Brian Hogan	Suzanne Collins	Mike Sosnoski and Steve Daye	October 19, 2006	111b
Wubbzy and his friends go to magic school, where their teacher, Moo Moo, a magician, teaches them magic tricks, but it's not easy for Wubbzy. Song: "Magic"
11a	11a	"Monster Madness"	Brian Hogan	Story by : Bob Boyle; Written by : Ross Hastings	Mike Sosnowski and Steve Daye	October 25, 2006	110a
Wubbzy stays up late watching scary movies and believes he sees the monsters from the movies in real life. Short: "Boo to You"
11b	11b	"The Last Leaf"	Brian Hogan	Frederick Stroppel	Steve Daye	October 25, 2006	110b
Walden wants to add the last leaf on a tree to add to his leaf collection, but it won't come off. Song: "Wait"
12a	12a	"Wubbzy Bounces Back!"	Patty Shinagawa	Raye Lankford	Drazen Kozjan and Bob Boyle	November 15, 2006	113a
Wubbzy wants to play Kickety-Kick Ball to celebrate the first day of spring, but it deflates. Short: "See Saw"
12b	12b	"Dash for Dolly"	Patty Shinagawa	Suzanne Collins	Drazen Kozjan and Brian Hogan	November 15, 2006	113b
Wubbzy wants to get the hammerin' holly dolly for Widget's birthday, but it is very expensive. Song: "Made by You (Make it Yourself)"
13a	13a	"Watch the Birdie"	Brian Hogan	Frederick Stroppel	Kevin Frank	November 16, 2006	114a
When Wubbzy learns Birdie Bird has stolen his belongings, he tries to get them back from her. Song: "You Gotta Be Free" Short: "Instant Cooking (Too Many Cooks)"
13b	13b	"Wubbzy Tells a Whopper"	Patty Shinagawa	Raye Lankford	James Burks	November 16, 2006	114b
Wubbzy accidentally breaks Widget's whammer-hammer, and lies about it by saying a creature called a Growlygus stole it, but it leads to chaos. Song: "That's Kooky!"
14a	14a	"The Snow Shoo Shoo"	Patty Shinagawa	Suzanne Collins	James Burks and Pete Mekis	December 1, 2006	115a
Wubbzy and his friends search for the Snow Shoo-Shoo monster when they do not see it in its usual location on top of Mount Zubba Bubba. Short: "I'm Flying"
14b	14b	"Pirate Treasure"	Patty Shinagawa	Suzanne Collins	Mike Goguen and Steve Daye	December 1, 2006	115b
Wubbzy's friends find a treasure map in a pirate book, and go on a treasure hunt to an island to find the treasure, but Widget and Walden think there are no pirates and treasure. Song: "Life is Filled with Treasure"
15a	15a	"Escape from Dino Island"	Brian Hogan	Frederick Stroppel	Kevin Frank and Bob Boyle	December 4, 2006	116a
Wubbzy and his friends visit Dino Island so they can get a close look at the dinosaurs living there. Short: "Picture Perfect"
15b	15b	"Widget Gets the Blooey Blues"	Brian Hogan	Ray Shenusay & Victor Bumbalo	Bill Thyen and Steve Daye	December 4, 2006	116b
When Widget's new invention fails, she gets the "blooey blues", so Wubbzy and Walden try to cheer her up. Song: "Be Happy"
16a	16a	"The Grass is Always Plaider"	Patty Shinagawa	Eileen Brennan	Carol Lay	January 29, 2007	112a
Wubbzy and his friends visit Plaidville after Wuzzleburg starts boring them. Short: "The Great Hat"
16b	16b	"Everything's Coming Up Wubbzy"	Patty Shinagawa	Raye Lankford	Bill Thyen and Steve Daye	January 29, 2007	112b
When everyone is too busy to play with Wubbzy, he wishes everyone was more like him, so Widget builds a hat that can make anybody act like Wubbzy. Song: "We're All Together (We're Not the Same)"
17a	17a	"Wubbzy's Magical Mess-Up"	Patty Shinagawa	Robert David	Brian Hogan and Mike Goguen	January 31, 2007	119a
Wubbzy watches Moo Moo the magician's magic shop while he's away, but uses his magic wand to do magic tricks without his permission. Song: "Magic" Short: "A Tree Grows in Wuzzleburg"
17b	17b	"Tea for Three"	Patty Shinagawa	Suzanne Collins	Carol Lay and James Burks	January 31, 2007	119b
Wubbzy wants to throw a tea party with his friends, but Walden insists it must be like his rule book says. Song: "By the Book"
18a	18a	"Come Spy with Me"	Brian Hogan	Jill Cozza	James Burks and Jim Schumann	February 1, 2007	120a
After Walden acts suspicious, Wubbzy and Widget try to spy on him. Short: "Sand Sculptures"
18b	18b	"Puddle Muddle"	Patty Shinagawa	Frederick Stroppel	Brian Hogan and Mike Sosnowski	February 1, 2007	120b
Wubbzy and his friends get a special picture taken together as a tradition, but Wubbzy has a hard time staying clean. Song: "That's Kooky!"
19a	19a	"Mr. Valentine"	Patty Shinagawa	Ross Hastings	James Burks and Drazen Kozjan	February 14, 2007	121a
It's Valentine's Day, and Wubbzy delivers all the Valentine's Day cards when the mailman is ill. Song: "Love is All Around"
19b	19b	"Wubbzy in the Middle"	Brian Hogan	Robert David	Tina Kügler and Steve Daye	February 14, 2007	121b
When Widget and Walden turn against each other, Wubbzy tries to get them to reconcile. Short: "Wubbzy's Personal Stamp"
20a	20a	"Mt. Fizzy Pop"	Patty Shinagawa	Frederick Stroppel	James Burks and Jim Schumann	December 11, 2007	123a
Mt. Fizzy Pop on Dino Island is about to erupt sour milky-milk on the town of Wuzzleburg, so Wubbzy and company try to stop it. Short: "Dino Bones"
20b	20b	"Zoo Hullabaloo"	Patty Shinagawa	Suzanne Collins	James Burks	December 11, 2007	123b
Wubbzy watches some of the zoo animals in his house while Widget repairs their cages, but the animals wreak havoc in his house. Song: "Pet Party"
21a	21a	"The Super Fixers"	Brian Hogan	Eileen Brennan	Steve Daye and Drazen Kozjan	December 13, 2007	125a
Widget becomes obsessed with her favorite TV show, the Super Fixers, when she builds a television set that has thirty screens, so Wubbzy and Walden try to get her away from it by acting like the characters. Short: "Puddles"
21b	21b	"Fly Us to the Moon"	Brian Hogan	Frederick Stroppel	Carol Lay and Bob Boyle	December 13, 2007	125b
Wubbzy and his friends wake up the Man on the Moon when he oversleeps and does not drive the moon across the sky. Song: "Planet Fun"
22a	22a	"O' Figgity Fig Tree"	Brian Hogan	Frederick Stroppel	Steve Daye	December 14, 2007	122a
When Wubbzy and his friends decorate the Christmas figgety-fig tree, things go a little out of control. Song: "Holiday Light"
22b	22b	"Snow Day"	Patty Shinagawa	Eileen Brennan	Carol Lay and Bob Boyle	December 14, 2007	122b
Wubbzy and Widget try to repair Walden's polar bear sculpture when Wubbzy crashes his sled into it. Short: "Snowman"
23a	23a	"The Tired Tail"	Brian Hogan	Suzanne Collins	Jim Schumann, James Burks and Steve Daye	February 29, 2008	126a
Wubbzy gets a tired tail where his tail loses its bounce, and needs to stay home and rest it, but Wubbzy has so many exciting plans. Song: "Be Happy" Short: "Twisty Twister"
23b	23b	"Wubbzy's Big Idea"	Patty Shinagawa	Story by : Brian Hogan; Written by : Raye Lankford	James Burks	February 29, 2008	126b
When Wubbzy is too small to do things, Widget builds an invention that can make Wubbzy grow. Song: "Small Thing"
24a	24a	"Where's My Wiggle Wrench?"	Patty Shinagawa	Jill Cozza	Carol Lay	April 4, 2008	117a
Widget is entering a building contest, but loses her confidence when she loses her lucky Wiggle-Wrench. Short: "Splish Splash"
24b	24b	"You Gotta Have Art"	Patty Shinagawa	Frederick Stroppel	Rossen Varbanov and Steve Daye	April 4, 2008	117b
Wubbzy takes up painting, but cannot find a good subject. Song: "Paint a Picture"
25a	25a	"Follow the Leader"	Brian Hogan	Holly Kim Almaguer	Kevin Frank and Bob Boyle	May 9, 2008	124a
Some Baby Chirpees lose their mother and mistake Wubbzy for her, so Wubbzy leads them to their real mother. Short: "Rooms"
25b	25b	"The Wubbzy Shuffle"	Brian Hogan	Jill Cozza	Steve Daye and Chris LaBonte	May 9, 2008	124b
Wubbzy is tired of losing at games, so he uses Widget's inventions in order to win. Song: "That's Kooky!"
26a	26a	"Broken Record"	Brian Hogan	Ross Hastings	Brian Hogan and Mike Sosnowski	June 20, 2008	118a
After helping Walden hand out trophies to people who broke records, Wubbzy attempts to get a trophy and get his name in the Wuzzleburg record book, but gets interrupted by people who need help. Short: "Me and My Shadow”
26b	26b	"Walden on the Beach"	Patty Shinagawa	Eileen Brennan	Steve Daye and Chris LaBonte	June 20, 2008	118b
Wubbzy and his friends head to the beach on a hot summer day. Wubbzy and Widget are having fun splashing around in the water, but Walden is too scared to go into the water with them. Song: "One Step at a Time"

=== Season 2 (2008–10) ===
No. overall	No. in season	Title	Directed by	Written by	Storyboard by	Original release date	Prod. code
27a	1a	"Who's That Girl?"	Ron Crown & Steve Daye	Frederick Stroppel	Kevin Frank	September 2, 2008	201a
Wubbzy meets Daizy, a puppy-like girl who has moved to Wuzzleburg, and tries to make her feel welcome. Note: The scene featuring Wubbzy and Daizy playing jump-rope at different speeds is slightly shortened in the final cut due to time constraints, according to a behind-to-scenes video by animator Paul Johnson. Wubb Club Short: "Wubb Club Tour"; Jukebox Robot Song: "The Wubbzy Wiggle"
27b	1b	"Wubbzy's Big Move"	James Burks & Ron Crown	Steve Daye	Robert Sledge	September 2, 2008	201b
Wubbzy thinks living in the Wubb Club could be a lot of fun and decides to move in, but everything goes haywire. Song: "Home"
28a	2a	"Wubbzy and the Fire Engine"	Steve Daye & Ron Crown	Steve Daye	Dave Hofmann	September 3, 2008	203a
After seeing firefighters helping out in an emergency, Wubbzy wishes he had his own fire engine, so Widget builds him one. Wubb Club Short: "The Bubble Contest"; Jukebox Robot Song: "Robot Dance" Guest star: Jeff Bennett as Fire Chief and Tall Chef
28b	2b	"Too Much of a Doodle Thing!"	James Burks & Ron Crown	Jill Cozza-Turner	Kevin Frank	September 3, 2008	203b
Wubbzy is addicted to doodleberries, and his friends think he should try something different. Song: "Too Much of a Good Thing" Guest star: James Arnold Taylor as Edgar, Barker and Guy on Park Bench
29a	3a	"Wubbzy and the Sparkle Stone"	James Burks & Larry Hall	Frederick Stroppel	Anne Walker	September 4, 2008	202a
Wubbzy takes care of Daizy's glow-in-the-dark sparkle stone ring while she's gardening, but Wubbzy drops it into a hole in the ground. So, he ventures underground with Widget and Walden to retrieve it. Wubb Club Short: "Silly Mirror Room"; Jukebox Robot Song: "Dance Dance Party"
29b	3b	"Meet the Wuzzles"	Steve Daye & Larry Hall	Frederick Stroppel	Jeff Mednikow	September 4, 2008	202b
Wubbzy and his friends have a dance party at the Wubb Club, and decide to be the band for it when they don't have one. Song: "The Wubbzy Wiggle"
30a	4a	"Bye Bye Birdies"	Steve Daye & Larry Hall	Suzanne Collins	Robert Sledge	September 5, 2008	204a
When a flock of migrating La-Dee-Da Birds are drawn to the Wubb Club, Wubbzy and friends must find a way to draw them away before a snowstorm hits. Wubb Club Short: "Strange Sounds"; Jukebox Robot Song: "The Wubbzy Wiggle"
30b	4b	"Call of the Mild"	James Burks & Larry Hall	Frank Rocco	Jeff Mednikow	September 5, 2008	204b
Daizy finds a uni-horn and she wants to keep it as pet. However, it gets lost and wanders into the Wuzzamboo Jungle. Song: "Are You Ready?"
31a	5a	"Tooth or Dare"	James Burks & Ron Crown	Ross Hastings	Ken Boyer	October 14, 2008	205a
Daizy loses a tooth and wants to meet the Tooth Fairy. But when she's away on vacation, Wubbzy fills in for her. Wubb Club Short: "Special Box"; Jukebox Robot Song: "Dance Dance Party"
31b	5b	"Moo Moo's Snoozity Snooze"	Steve Daye & Ron Crown	Pammy Salmon	Anne Walker	October 14, 2008	205b
During the night, Moo Moo sleepwalks and casts magic spells all over Wuzzleburg, so Wubbzy and his friends try to wake him up. Song: "Wake Up"
32a	6a	"Welcome to the Dollhouse"	James Burks & Larry Hall	Jill Cozza-Turner	Jeff Mednikow	October 15, 2008	210a
Widget builds a dollhouse for Daizy, but while Widget and Walden are absent, Wubbzy and Daizy use Widget's new invention to shrink themselves so they can play inside the dollhouse. Wubb Club Short: "Daizy's Dolls"; Jukebox Robot Song: "Dance Dance Party"
32b	6b	"What Would Wubbzy Do?"	Steve Daye & Larry Hall	Eileen Brennan	Anne Walker	October 15, 2008	210b
Wubbzy delivers jars of doodleberry jelly, but when there are too many jars to deliver, he does it others' ways to make it easier. Song: "You are You (Be Yourself)"
33a	7a	"Wubbzy the Hero"	James Burks & Ron Crown	Frederick Stroppel	Eric Sanford	October 16, 2008	211a
The townspeople believe Wubbzy saved the town from a dinosaur, whom Wubbzy befriended. Wubb Club Short: "Fossil Fools"; Jukebox Robot Song: "Robot Dance"
33b	7b	"The Nasty Nose"	Steve Daye & Ron Crown	Suzanne Collins	Kevin Frank	October 16, 2008	211b
Wubbzy gets a case of "nasty nose", where his nose gets all swollen and polka-dotted. He disguises it so he can attend a pool party. Song: "Different People"
34a	8a	"Daizy's Hair Salon"	James Burks & Larry Hall	Frederick Stroppel	Robert Sledge	October 17, 2008	212a
Daizy has her own hair salon, but when no one will come, Wubbzy, Widget, and Walden pretend to be her customers. Wubb Club Short: "Hairy Dan"; Jukebox Robot Song: "The Wubbzy Wiggle"
34b	8b	"New Kid on the Block"	Steve Daye & Larry Hall	Jill Cozza-Turner	Jeff Mednikow	October 17, 2008	212b
Wubbzy's class is having a contest where whoever does a good job in each class will win a Captain Wonderpants item. However, a new student named Murphy keeps Wubbzy from winning an item, and Murphy wins them, making Wubbzy jealous. Song: "New Kid"
35a	9a	"The Ghost of Wuzzleburg"	Steve Daye & Ron Crown	Eileen Brennan	Jeff Mednikow	October 29, 2008	207b
Wubbzy dresses up as a scary monster for the Halloween party in the Wubb Club, and scares everyone thinking he is a real monster. Song: "Halloween Night"
35b	9b	"March of the Pumpkins"	James Burks & Ron Crown	Frederick Stroppel	Anne Walker	October 29, 2008	207a
Wuzzleburg is having an autumn festival and Wubbzy is very determined to win with his pumpkin. Short: "Trick or Treat"; Jukebox Robot Song: "Dance Dance Party"
36a	10a	"Great and Grumpy Holiday"	James Burks & Ron Crown	Frank Rocco	Anne Walker	December 5, 2008	213a
Wubbzy stops at nothing to get the perfect Christmas tree that is on Old Man Grumpus' land. Wubb Club Short: "Snow Day"; Jukebox Robot Song: "The Wubbzy Wiggle"
36b	10b	"The Super Special Gift"	Steve Daye & Ron Crown	Suzanne Collins	Eric Sanford	December 5, 2008	213b
Wubbzy promises Daizy a super-special gift for Christmas, so he helps Santa deliver all the Christmas presents, including a rainbow for Daizy. Song: "Gift of Joy"
37a	11a	"Cupid's Little Helper"	James Burks & Ron Crown	Frederick Stroppel	Jeff Mednikow	February 13, 2009	215a
Wubbzy finds Cupid's bubble wand that makes everyone fall in love with each other, but not knowing it belongs to Cupid, ends up creating odd couples all over Wuzzleburg. Wubb Club Short: "Valentine's Day"; Song: "Love is All Around" Guest star: Jeff Bennett as Cupid
37b	11b	"My Speedy Valentine"	Steve Daye & Ron Crown	Laurie Israel & Rachel Ruderman	Anne Walker	February 13, 2009	215b
Wubbzy and the trio need to create Valentines quickly so they can give them to all their friends at the Valentine's Day party in time. Song: "I Love You"
38a	12a	"Daizy's Favorite Place"	James Burks & Larry Hall	Ross Hastings	Kevin Frank	February 23, 2009	214a
Daizy takes her friends to the park for a picnic, but everyone believes the goats, Kickety-Kick Ball players, and buzzy bees are ruining her picnic. Wubb Club Short: "Flower Fun Time"; Jukebox Robot Song: "Dance Dance Party"
38b	12b	"Quiet Wubbzy"	Steve Daye & Larry Hall	Frederick Stroppel	Robert Sledge	February 23, 2009	214b
Wubbzy finds a Woogle Bugle and wants to play it, but it makes a loud sound, and everyone wants him to be quiet. Song: "Let's Be Quiet"
39a	13a	"Once Upon a Wubbzy"	Steve Daye & Larry Hall	Frederick Stroppel	Eric Sanford	February 24, 2009	218a
Wubbzy and Daizy ruin Widget's pickleberry bush by accident and then try to replace it before she finds out by visiting the forest. Wubb Club Short: "Magic Beans"; Jukebox Robot Song: "Robot Dance"
39b	13b	"Big Birthday Mystery"	James Burks & Larry Hall	Frederick Stroppel	Anne Walker & Julian Chaney	February 24, 2009	218b
When everyone disappears on Wubbzy's birthday, Wubbzy uses his new detective kit to solve the mystery. Song: "Birthday Birthday"
40a	14a	"Hangin' with Mr. Gummy"	Steve Daye & Larry Hall	Frederick Stroppel	Kevin Frank	February 25, 2009	216a
Wubbzy accidentally breaks Mr. Gummy's window and as an apology spends the day with him. Wubb Club Short: "Imagine That"; Song: "Imagine"
40b	14b	"Wonder Wubbzy"	James Burks & Larry Hall	Jill Cozza-Turner	Eric Sanford	February 25, 2009	216b
Wubbzy and Daizy get inspired by Captain Wonderpants to play superheroes but think they are not so super. Song: "Hero"
41a	15a	"Hoop Dreamz"	Steve Daye & Ron Crown	Frederick Stroppel	Jeff Mednikow	February 26, 2009	217a
Feeling unneeded, Wubbzy befriends with a hoopity-hoop player named Jam-Jam James, and fills in for a player on his sports team. Wubb Club Short: "Hoopty Hoops"; Jukebox Robot Song: "The Wubbzy Wiggle" Guest star: Phil LaMarr as Jam-Jam James and Wally
41b	15b	"Daizy's Purple Thumb"	James Burks & Ron Crown	Frederick Stroppel	Robert Sledge	February 26, 2009	217b
When Daizy's thumb turns purple, she thinks it's affected her gardening abilities. Song: "Don't Give Up"
42a	16a	"Big Bunny Blues"	James Burks & Larry Hall	Frederick Stroppel	Brian Hogan	April 10, 2009	208a
When Easter is cancelled, Wubbzy and his friends go to Easter Island to meet the Easter Bunny, to see what's wrong. Wubb Club Short: "Coloring Eggs"; Jukebox Robot Song: "The Wubbzy Wiggle"
42b	16b	"Flower Day Parade"	Steve Daye & Larry Hall	Suzanne Collins	Ken Boyer	April 10, 2009	208b
Wubbzy wants to contribute the flower day parade. Song: "You're a Star"
43a	17a	"Save the Wuzzly"	Steve Daye & Larry Hall	Frederick Stroppel	Kevin Frank	April 22, 2009	206a
Wubbzy and his friends must find a new place for the Wuzzly bears to live when their bamboo-boo trees get cut down for a playground. Wubb Club Short: "Wacky Hat Day"; Jukebox Robot Song: "The Wubbzy Wiggle"
43b	17b	"All Bottled Up"	James Burks & Larry Hall	Frederick Stroppel	Robert Sledge	April 22, 2009	206b
When Wuzzleburg becomes a bottle wasteland, and there are too many bottles to recycle, Wubbzy and his friends try other ways to get rid of the bottles. Song: "Beautiful World"
44a	18a	"Wubb Girlz Rule"	James Burks & Ron Crown	Frederick Stroppel	Kevin Frank	April 27, 2009	219a
A popular girl group called the Wubb Girlz comes to Wuzzleburg. While Wubbzy shows them around, their fans, unfortunately, do not get to see them because they are having so much fun with their newest fan and friend, Wubbzy. Guest star: Beyoncé Knowles as Shine
44b	18b	"Wuzzleburg Idol"	Steve Daye & Ron Crown	Frederick Stroppel	Robert Sledge	April 27, 2009	219b
The Wubb Girlz are hosting a talent competition. While everyone tries to act just like them for the competition, Wubbzy decides to just be himself while participating in the Wuzzleburg Idol competition. Song: "Sing a Song" (performed by Beyoncé) Guest star: Beyoncé Knowles as Shine
45a	19a	"Bye Bye Wuzzleburg"	James Burks & Larry Hall	Suzanne Collins	Jeff Mednikow	April 28, 2009	220a
Continuing from the previous episode, Wubbzy is now set to go to Wuzzlewood with the Wubb Girlz. Unfortunately, Wubbzy is afraid to go to a new town, and wants to avoid doing so by any means necessary. Guest stars: Beyoncé Knowles as Shine and Jann Carl as Jann Starl
45b	19b	"Wubbzy's Wacky Journey"	James Burks & Ron Crown	Ross Hastings	Eric Sanford	April 28, 2009	220b
Walden refuses to let anyone stop at fun places along the drive to Wuzzlewood. Song: "Time for Fun" Guest star: Beyoncé Knowles as Shine
46a	20a	"Wubbzy's Big Makeover"	James Burks & Larry Hall	Jill Cozza-Turner	Robert Sledge	April 29, 2009	222a
Wubbzy tries to adjust to his new image as a hip-hop dancing star named Wubb-Z. Guest stars: Beyoncé Knowles as Shine and Jann Carl as Jann Starl
46b	20b	"The Big Wuzzlewood Concert"	Steve Daye & Larry Hall	Eileen Brennan	Jeff Mednikow	April 29, 2009	222b
Wubbzy struggles with stage-fright when preparing to perform with the Wubb Girlz. To help their friend, Wubbzy's friends try several things, from Walden's hypnosis to Widget's invention, the Wow Wow 3000, but nothing works, especially when Widget's invention begins to malfunction. The real Wubbzy then gets told by the Wubb Girlz that performing together is the best way to conquer stage-fright. Song: "No Fear" Guest stars: Beyoncé Knowles as Shine and Jann Carl as Jann Starl
47a	21a	"Lights, Camera, Wubbzy"	James Burks & Ron Crown	Frederick Stroppel	Julian Chaney	April 30, 2009	223a
Wubbzy is offered a role in the new Wubb Girlz movie as a literal star. Song: "You're a Star" Guest stars: Beyoncé Knowles as Shine and Jann Carl as Jann Starl
47b	21b	"A Wubbstar Is Born"	Steve Daye & Ron Crown	Frederick Stroppel	Eric Sanford	April 30, 2009	223b
After becoming a movie star and starring in several movies, Wubbzy realizes that he now has no time to hang out with his friends. Song: "Me and My Friends" Guest stars: Beyoncé Knowles as Shine and Jann Carl as Jann Starl
48a	22a	"Ty Ty the Tool Guy"	Steve Daye & Larry Hall	Frederick Stroppel	Julian Chaney	December 14, 2009	221a
Widget's friend, Ty Ty the Tool Guy, teams up with her friends to build a new house for the Quacker family when it gets blown down by Packy the Elephant. However, they can't seem to agree on what to use while building, and turn against each other. In the end, they learn to work together. Wubb Club Short: "House Calls"; Song: "Let's Do It" Guest star: Ty Pennington as Ty Ty the Tool Guy
48b	22b	"Happily Ever After"	Steve Daye & Ron Crown	Steve Daye	Kevin Frank	December 14, 2009	221b
Widget builds a machine bringing a crazy and mischievous book character called the Hopping Dipple Dop to life, who causes havoc all around Wuzzleburg on a search for his cat. Jukebox Robot Song: "Robot Dance"
49a	23a	"What a Card"	James Burks & Ron Crown	Frank Rocco	Frank Rocco	December 15, 2009	225a
Wubbzy and Daizy befriend Earl, who just got a rare footy-football card of Touchdown Tiki. They both want the Tiki card, so they keep acting nice, and turn against each other. Note: There was an unreleased short entitled "Card Tricks" that was intended to be part of this episode, but never made it to the animation or music stage due to time constraints, though it is viewable (in animatic form) on YouTube. The story was written by Frederick Stroppel, with storyboard art by Frank Rocco, supervising by James Burks, and revisions by Angela Gilman and Suzanne Burks. Song: "Share" Guest star: Tiki Barber as Touchdown Tiki
49b	23b	"Too Many Wubbzy's"	James Burks, Steve Daye & Ron Crown	Frederick Stroppel	James Burks & Steve Daye	December 15, 2009	225b
When Wubbzy can't be in three places with each of his friends at the same name, he uses Widget's new clone machine to make clones of himself, but they later turn quirky. Jukebox Robot Song: "The Wubbzy Wiggle"
50a	24a	"Mr. Unlucky"	James Burks & Larry Hall	Frederick Stroppel	Kevin Frank	December 16, 2009	224a
Wubbzy's convinced he has bad luck. Wubb Club Short: "Try Your Luck"; Jukebox Robot Song: "Dance Dance Party"
50b	24b	"Focus Wubbzy"	Steve Daye & Larry Hall	Frederick Stroppel	Robert Sledge	December 16, 2009	224b
Wubbzy keeps getting distracted while trying to help his friends. Song: "Focus"
51a	25a	"Rush Hour"	James Burks & Larry Hall	Frederick Stroppel	Eric Sanford	December 17, 2009	226a
Wubbzy always likes to rush past the boring parts in life to get to the fun parts. Wubb Club Short: "Something's Fishy"; Jukebox Robot Song: "Robot Dance"
51b	25b	"Wubbzy's Rainy Day"	Steve Daye & Larry Hall	Steve Daye	Kevin Frank	December 17, 2009	226b
Wubbzy and his friends make up fun things to do inside when rain spoils their plans. Song: "So Much to Do"
52a	26a	"Run for Fun"	James Burks & Ron Crown	Frederick Stroppel	Kevin Frank	February 21, 2010	209b
Wubbzy and his friends compete in the Wuzzleburg Wacky Dash, as part of the Wuzzlolymic games. Everyone just wants to win and cheats, except Daizy. Song: "Done with Fun" Guest star: Michelle Kwan as Michelle Kwanzleberry
52b	26b	"Woozy Walden"	Steve Daye & Ron Crown	Jill Cozza-Turner	Robert Sledge	February 21, 2010	209a
Walden gets a case of "Chickenitis" where he cannot stop clucking like a chicken, so Wubbzy and Daizy try to take care of Walden while Widget gets the doctor. Wubb Club Short: "Spider World"; Jukebox Robot Song: "The Wubbzy Wiggle"

== TV films/specials (2008–09) ==
No.	Title	Directed by	Written by	Storyboard by	Original release date
M1	"Wubbzy's Big Movie!"	Bob Boyle, James Burks, Steve Daye, Mike Goguen, Kevin Frank, Brian Hogan, Drazen Kozjan, Jeff Mednikow, Jim Schumann & Mike Sosnowski	Steve Daye, Brian Hogan, Frank Rocco & Patty Shinagawa	Victor Bumbalo, Suzanne Collins, Ross Hastings, Raye Lankford, Ray Shenusay & Frederick Stroppel	August 29, 2008 (Starz Kids & Family)
When Wubbzy hits his head, he loses his memory and moos like a cow. His friends need to solve his problem. Songs: "That's Kooky!", "Be Happy", "Life is Filled with Treasure", and "Perfect Day"
M2	"Wubb Idol"	James Burks, Ron Crown, Steve Daye & Larry Hall	Eileen Brennan, Suzanne Collins, Ross Hastings, Frederick Stroppel & Jill Cozza-Turner	Julian Chaney, Kevin Frank, Jeff Mednikow, Eric Sanford & Robert Sledge	May 1, 2009
Wubbzy's journey to Wuzzlewood begins once the Wubb Girlz come to town in this hour-long special. Songs: "Sing a Song" (performed by Beyoncé), "Time for Fun", "Have No Fear", "You're a Star" and "Me and My Friends" Guest stars: Beyoncé Knowles as Shine and Jann Carl as Jann Starl
