= Mike Reagan =

American composer

- Genres: Television, film, video games
- Occupations: Composer, songwriter, music producer

Michael Reagan is an American composer, songwriter and music producer for film, television, and video games. His TV work includes The Powerpuff Girls, Chico Bon Bon: Monkey with a Tool Belt, and Bob Boyle's Wow! Wow! Wubbzy!. His film work includes Any Given Sunday, Odnoklassniki.ru: naCLICKay udachu starring Snoop Dogg, the original song "Heart and Soul" for Ripple Effect featuring Asdru Sierra from Ozomatli, and the song "Take The First Step" for the Sony Pictures / Jim Henson Studios feature film Elmo in Grouchland, which won a Grammy Award for Best Children's Soundtrack.

His video game work includes Square Enix' Life Is Strange: Before the Storm, Valhalla Game Studios Devil's Third, and Sony Interactive Entertainment's God of War, God of War II, God of War III, and God of War: Ghost of Sparta, which won several awards including the Interactive Academy Award, Game Audio Network Guild's Music of the Year and Best Original Soundtrack. Other game projects include Conan, Twisted Metal: Black, NBA 2K8, Darkwatch, Rise of the Kasai and Brute Force.

== Career ==
Reagan studied guitar, composition, and music synthesis at Berklee College of Music in Boston, Mass. He began his professional career as a sound designer at Soundelux, Hollywood. Reagan's work was recognized with an Academy Award nomination for sound design in John Woo's Face/Off. It was during this project that Reagan met director John Woo, and composers John Powell, Hans Zimmer and other notable talent working at what is now known as Remote Control Productions (American company).

While continuing his career in sound design, Reagan began simultaneously writing and producing original songs for various films. At the same time, Reagan began scoring top video games for Walt Disney Studios, Activision, Microsoft, Universal and Sony Computer Entertainment including the God of War and Twisted Metal Franchises, as well as iconic properties such as Conan, The Transformers, Darkwatch, Darksiders, Marvel's Spider-Man: Into the Spider-Verse and many others.

As film and television projects soon followed, Reagan found his way to a full-time career as a composer. First with the films Unbeatable Harold starring Henry Winkler, and Magic Laptop starring Snoop Dogg. Episodic television work soon followed, and to date Reagan has written the scores and songs for hundreds of television episodes including Bob Boyle's Wow! Wow! Wubbzy!, Rovio's Angry Birds Toons series, Cartoon Network’s The Powerpuff Girls, and the 2020 Netflix release of Chico Bon Bon: Monkey with a Tool Belt. Reagan scored the 2021 feature film: Abby's List: a Dogumentary.

== Discography ==
=== Composer ===
Television
Year	Title	Studio/Production Company
2006–2010	Wow! Wow! Wubbzy!	Bolder Media, Starz Media
2008	Wubbzy's Big Movie!	Bolder Media, Starz Media
2009	Wow! Wow! Wubbzy!: Wubb Idol	Bolder Media, Starz Media
2009	Ape Escape	Toonzone Studios, Hawaii Film Partners, Frederator Studios
2011	Sports Ballz	Blue Apples Media
2013–2016	Angry Birds Toons	Rovio Animation
2016–2019	The Powerpuff Girls	Cartoon Network Studios
2019	The Wonderful Wingits	Cartoon Network Studios
2020	Chico Bon Bon: Monkey with a Tool Belt	Silvergate Media
2020	Trick Moon	Cartoon Network Studios
2024–2026	Rock Paper Scissors	Nickelodeon Animation Studio
2024	Invincible Fight Girl	Cartoon Network Studios

Video Games
Year	Title	Production company
1999	Villains' Revenge	Disney Interactive
1999	Xena: Warrior Princess	Vivendi Universal Games
2000	NHL 2001	EA Sports
2000	NBA 2001	EA Sports
2001	Twisted Metal: Black	Incog Inc. Entertainment
2001	Final Four 2002	Sony Computer Entertainment America
2001	Twisted Metal Small Brawl	Incog Inc. Entertainment
2002	Draconus: Cult of the Wyrm	Treyarch
2003	Brute Force	Digital Anvil
2003	Rise to Honor	Sony Computer Entertainment America
2004	Van Helsing	Saffire
2005	God of War	Santa Monica Studio, Sony Computer Entertainment
2005	Rise of the Kasai	BottleRocket
2005	Darkwatch: Curse of the West	Black Powder Media Inc., Sammy Studios
2007	God of War II	Santa Monica Studio
2007	Transformers: The Game	Savage Entertainment
2007	Conan	VoiceWorks Productions
2007	Spider-Man: Friend or Foe	Artificial Mind & Movement (A2M), Beenox, Columbia Pictures
2008	God of War: Chains of Olympus	Ready at Dawn Studios
2010	Darksiders	PCB Productions
2010	God of War III	Santa Monica Studio
2010	God of War: Ghost of Sparta	Ready at Dawn Studios
2012	Trials Evolution	RedLynx
2012	Outwitters	One Man Left Studios
2013	Pudding Monsters	ZeptoLab
2013	Amazing Alex	Rovio Entertainment
2013	Turbo Racing League	DreamWorks Animation
2015	Devil's Third	Valhalla & Doobic, Valhalla Game Studios
2017	Life Is Strange: Before the Storm	Deck Nine Games, Idol Minds

Film
Year	Title	Production company
2002	Nowhere to Hide	ICT Productions Inc.
2004	V.E.N.O.M.	Blue Apples Media
2006	Unbeatable Harold	All Is Well Films, Mirror Images Productions Corp
2008	The Writer Couple (Short)	Contradictory Elements, Nomadic Creations
2012	Angry Birds: Meet the Pink Bird (Short)	Rovio Entertainment
2012	Angry Birds Star Wars Cinematic Trailer (Short)	Rovio Entertainment
2013	Odnoklassniki.ru: naCLICKay udachu	Art Pictures Studio
2014	Somewhere in the Valley (Short)	N/A
2014	Funeral Friends (Short)	N/A
2015	American Snapper (Short)	Hazel Films
2020	Abby's List: A Dogumentary	Albert Pictures
