= Wow! Wow! Wubbzy!: Wubb Idol =

- DVD art
- Also known as: Wubb Idol
- Based on: Wow! Wow! Wubbzy! by Bob Boyle
- Written by: Eileen Brennan; Suzanne Collins; Ross Hastings; Frederick Stroppel; Jill Cozza-Turner
- Directed by: James Burks; Ron Crown; Steve Daye; Larry Hall
- Starring: Grey DeLisle; Tara Strong; Lara Jill Miller; Carlos Alazraqui; Beyoncé Knowles; Jann Carl
- Music by: Mike Reagan
- Country of origin: United States
- Original language: English

Production
- Producer: Andi Rodriguez
- Editor: Bill Charnega
- Running time: 44 minutes (TV version); 88 minutes (DVD version)
- Production companies: Bolder Media; Starz Media

Original release
- Network: Nickelodeon
- Release: May 1, 2009

Related
- Wubbzy's Big Movie!

Wubb Idol is an American animated musical comedy television special based on this animated series Wow! Wow! Wubbzy!; it is the series' second film overall, after 2008's Wubbzy's Big Movie!, and consists of the episodes "Wubb Girlz Rule", "Wuzzleburg Idol", "Wubbzy's Big Makeover", and "The Big Wuzzlewood Concert". The movie originally aired on Nickelodeon in the United States on May 1, 2009, with an encore airing on Noggin two days later.

Wubb Idol follows protagonist Wubbzy and his friends as they meet the popular music group Wubb Girlz — consisting of Shine, Sparkle, and Shimmer — who choose him to perform at their concert in the city of Wuzzlewood (based on real-life Hollywood). American singer and actress Beyoncé guest-starred as the voice of the Wubb Girlz's lead singer Shine, who was heavily featured in promotion for the film.

The DVD release of Wubb Idol also includes the episodes "Bye Bye Wuzzleburg", "Wubbzy's Wacky Journey", "Lights, Camera, Wubbzy", and "A Wubbstar Is Born".

== Plot ==
Similar to Wubbzy's Big Movie!, the special is an anthology consisting of four episodes from the series: "Wubb Girlz Rule", "Wuzzleburg Idol", "Wubbzy's Big Makeover", and "The Big Wuzzlewood Concert".

In "Wubb Girlz Rule", the Wubb Girlz, consisting of Shine, Shimmer and Sparkle, are the most popular singing group of all time, and everyone in Wuzzleburg loves them. When it is announced that the Wubb Girlz are visiting Wuzzleburg, the townspeople plan a special welcome for them. However, when they go to the airport to see them, assuming that they are flying to Wuzzleburg, they are not there. Meanwhile, Wubbzy, who is unaware of who the girls are or their visit, arrives at the train station to see them in action, and it turns that the girls have arrived by train instead of plane, confused that most of the residents are not there to greet them. Wubbzy thinks they have moved to Wuzzleburg, so he meets up with them and gives them a tour of the town. Back at the airport, the townspeople learn from a nearby information booth that the girls are arriving by train, and they end up tailing Wubbzy and the girls all day. That night, they finally find them at the Wubb Club, where the Wubb Girlz announce that they will host a Wuzzleburg Idol talent show, the winner of which will travel with them back to Wuzzlewood to perform with the girls in their next concert (finally clicking to Wubbzy who they exactly are). Though Walden laments that the welcome did not go as planned, the girls tell everyone that Wubbzy is a great tour guide and they love Wuzzleburg. They all head inside the clubhouse for a party, in celebration of the girls' arrival.

"Wuzzleburg Idol" takes place on the day of the talent show, where Wubbzy tries to follow the advice of his friends to imitate the Wubb Girlz, but finds that he cannot do anything like them, leaving him saddened. The girls find a despondent Wubbzy on a park bench and give him advice to be himself and do whatever he's best-talented in. That night at the talent show, the Wubb Girlz are disappointed that most of the contestants are just trying to emulate them. They are promptly met with pleasant surprise at the sight of Wubbzy's act—showing off an original talent, having followed their advice. Wubbzy is declared the winner of the contest.

In "Wubbzy's Big Makeover", Wubbzy arrives in Wuzzlewood (the series' equivalent to Hollywood), having brought Widget, Walden and Daizy with him on the trip. The Wubb Girlz show them the Wuzzlewood Bowl, where they will be performing the concert. The Wubb Girlz also introduce them to Stu, their agent, but when Stu meets Wubbzy, he tells him he does not "look like a star", and needs a new look to fit into town. At Stu's prompting, Wubbzy dresses in a hip-hop outfit, is given a trio of fellow hip-hop dancers, and changes his name to "Wubb-Z". However, it causes Wubbzy to act too cool, and he starts referring to Widget, Walden and Daizy as his "old friends", and abandons them. During the rehearsal for the concert, Wubbzy acts apathetic instead of acting like his old self, much to the Wubb Girlz' dismay. While posing for pictures on his new motorcycle, Wubbzy accidentally turns it on, and flies up into the sky, eventually landing onto the edge of the Wuzzlewood Sign, hanging by his pants. He begs his fellow dancers to save him, but they refuse, stating he's "uncool". Luckily, Widget, Walden and Daizy rescue him in the Wubb-Copter. Back at the Wuzzlewood Bowl, Wubbzy apologizes, reconciles with his friends, and goes back to his old self. Stu wants to do more work with him, but Wubbzy refuses, so Stu shrugs and leaves. They then head backstage to finish rehearsing, and the Wubb Girlz are also happy he's back to normal.

“The Big Wuzzlewood Concert" takes place on the night of the concert. However, when famous news reporter Jann Starl (voiced by Jann Carl) interviews Wubbzy and points out that he's going to perform in front of a huge audience, Wubbzy begins to suffer from stage fright, so his friends try to help cure his stage fright backstage before the show starts. The Wubb Girlz tell him they feel better whenever they have each other around them, so they invite Wubbzy's friends to perform with him in the concert. They accept, and they all deliver a great performance (an animated music video for "Sing a Song", sung by Beyoncé herself).

== Cast ==
- Beyoncé Knowles as Shine
- Jann Carl as Jann Starl
- Grey DeLisle as Wubbzy, Sparkle, Kooky Kid, Intercom Voice, Kool Kid #1, Sock Monster and Actress
- Tara Strong as Daizy, Shimmer, Info Booth Woman, Arcade Girl and Kool Kid #3
- Lara Jill Miller as Widget, Video Game Character and Kool Kid #2
- Carlos Alazraqui as Walden, Announcer, Conductor, Chef Fritz, Zookeeper, Dandy Driver, Stu, Photographer, Director and Mummy

== Premiere week ==
On April 27, 2009, a "premiere week" of new episodes was aired and lasted throughout April 30, before the actual movie premiere on May 1. This is a list of the individual episodes that aired. This schedule also reflects the end of Wow! Wow! Wubbzy! on Nickelodeon as part of its Nick Jr. block.

Time	Episode	Air Date
10:00am	Wubb Girlz Rule / Wuzzleburg Idol	April 27, 2009
10:00am	Bye Bye Wuzzleburg / Wubbzy's Wacky Journey	April 28, 2009
10:00am	Wubbzy's Big Makeover / The Big Wuzzlewood Concert	April 29, 2009
10:00am	Lights, Camera, Wubbzy / A Wubbstar Is Born	April 30, 2009
1:00pm	Wubb Idol (TV movie)	May 1, 2009
