= Susan Miller (producer) =

American film producer

Susan Miller is an American television and film producer, digital media producer, book packager and licensing executive with a special focus in family entertainment. She is the founder of Mixed Media Group, Inc., which is a firm specializing in the development, production and licensing of a range of intellectual properties.

== Media ==
Susan Miller is President of Cupcake Digital Inc., a firm known for creating digital interactive story apps that include educational aspects and adhere to the Common Core State Standards Initiative. With three modes of reading along with professional narration and learning games, the Cupcake Digital apps bring legacy characters to life and teach kids learning concepts such as recognizing words and sounds.

She is also the co-founder of Bolder Media, Inc., which focuses on the development of media for young children. She is the co-executive producer of the hit Nick Jr. cartoon series Wow! Wow! Wubbzy!.

== Films and television ==
Miller was the co-producer of the Miramax feature film, Ella Enchanted starring Anne Hathaway. The New York Times described the film as "one of the best films for older children in quite some time."

Wow! Wow! Wubbzy! airs in over 100 countries on major broadcasters including Disney Junior, Nickelodeon UK, Nickelodeon Australia, ABC Australia, Super RTL, Discovery Kids Latin America, Cartoon Network, Treehouse TV and others. Wubbzy has received an Emmy, Telly and KidScreen Award for Best Television Movie, Wubb Idol, starring Beyoncé.

== Publishing ==
Since 1996, Miller has represented designer and author Sandra Magsamen. In 2008, Walmart became the licensing partner for the "From the Studio of Sandra Magsamen" and "Wishes and Kisses" brands.

Miller has also enjoyed success in the book market where she has put together many multimillion-dollar publishing programs with an array of clients and properties including Meredith Corporation, Time, Inc., Scholastic, HarperCollins, Viacom, Marvel, The Mrs. Fields Cookie Corp., World Champion figure skater Michelle Kwan and actors Will Smith and Jada Pinkett Smith. Miller's first book project, The Mrs. Fields Cookie Book, was a New York Times bestseller. Will Smith's book, Just the Two of Us, was awarded the NAACP Image Award for Best Children's Book of the Year. Russell the Sheep and Splat the Cat are New York Times bestsellers published by HarperCollins and translated around the world.

== Corporate ==
Prior to launching her own company in 1994, Miller was a Vice President of Consumer Products Licensing at Warner Bros. – She brought the Shari Lewis's LambChop and Friends television property to Warner Bros. and is credited as the architect of the multinational licensing and consumer products program. She also managed corporate and trademark licensing programs for Pillsbury, Sports Illustrated, Sports Illustrated for Kids, The Mrs. Fields Cookie Corp., Pizza Hut, Burger King and 7Up. Miller has held sales and marketing positions with Xerox Corp., Colgate-Palmolive and American Express.

== Education ==
She holds a B.S. from Cornell and an M.B.A. from New York University. She is a lecturer of Business Communications at University of Michigan Ross School of Business, and an invited speaker at NYU Stern Graduate School of Business, Columbia University, Licensing Show, KidScreen Summit, New York Women in Film and Television, and Association of American Publishers.
