= Tale of Tales =

Tale of Tales may refer to:

- The Tale of Tales, or Entertainment for Little Ones, a collection of fairy tales by Giambattista Basile
- Tale of Tales (1979 film) (Skazka skazok), a 1979 film by Yuri Norstein
- Tale of Tales (2015 film) (Il racconto dei racconti), a 2015 film by Matteo Garrone
- Tale of Tales (company), a Belgian video game development company
- "A Tale of Tails," an episode of the series Wow! Wow! Wubbzy!
- A Tail of Tails, an episode of Earth to Luna.
