= Starz Distribution =

Distribution arm of Starz Inc.

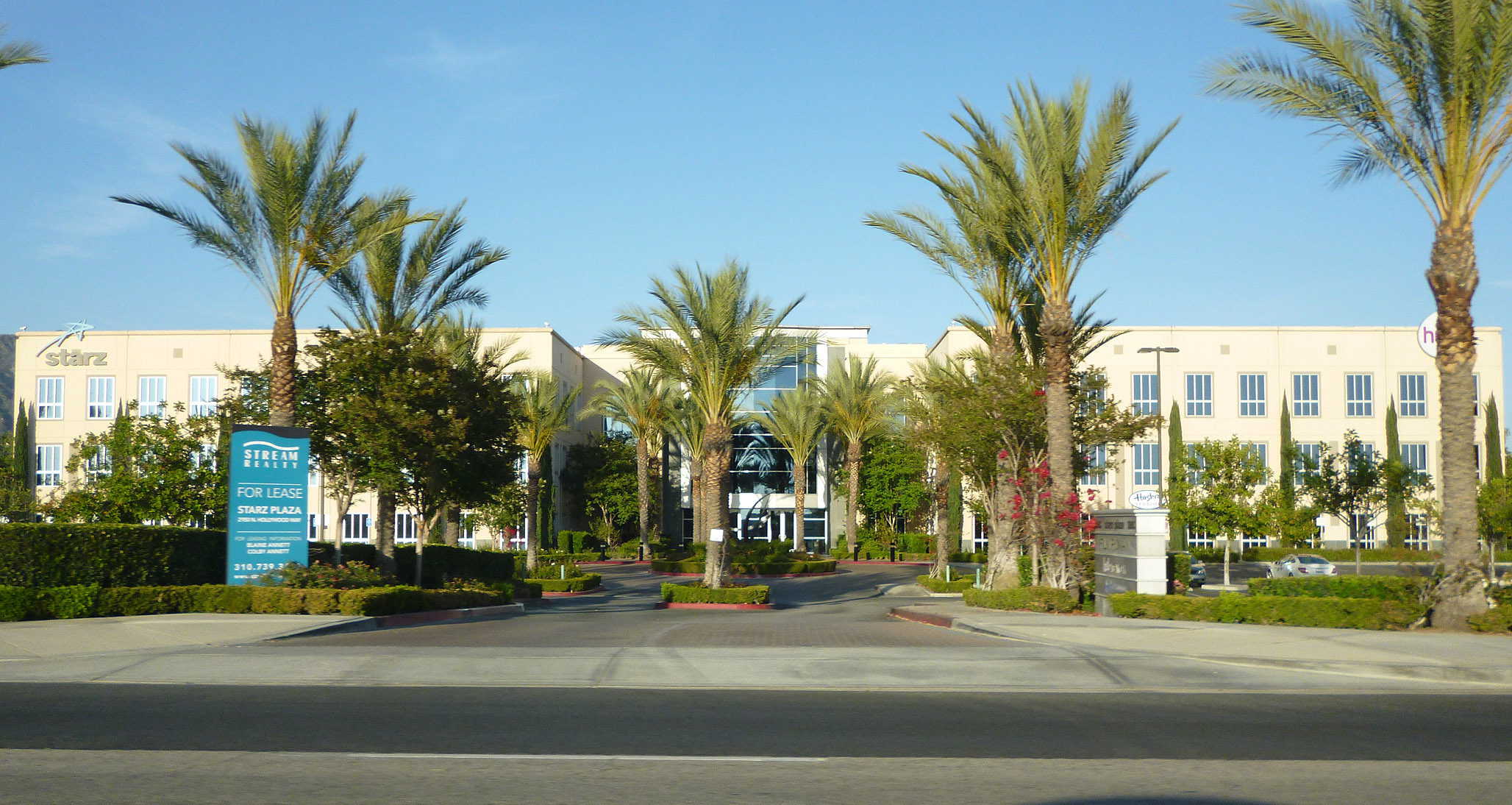
- Starz Distribution's former headquarters office in Burbank
- Formerly: IDT Entertainment (2003–2006); Starz Media (2006–2013)
- Type: Subsidiary
- Industry: Motion pictures Television; Home video
- Founded: November 11, 2003; 23 years ago
- Founder: IDT Corporation
- Defunct: December 8, 2016; 9 years ago
- Fate: Folded into Lionsgate's television distribution, motion picture, and home entertainment arms
- Headquarters: Burbank, California, U.S.
- Key people: Chris Albrecht (CEO)
- Parent: IDT Corporation (2003–2006); Starz Inc. (2006–2016)
- Divisions: Starz Digital; Starz Media Sales
- Subsidiaries: Anchor Bay Entertainment; Starz Animation (2004–2011); Film Roman (2003–2015); Mainframe Entertainment (2003–2006); Manga Entertainment; POW! Entertainment (5%); Vanguard Animation (Minority interest); Union Pool

Starz Distribution, formerly IDT Entertainment and Starz Media, was an American television production, distribution and syndication company and the distribution arm of Starz Inc., a subsidiary of Starz Entertainment, established in 2003. It developed, produced and acquired original programming content branded as Starz Originals, feature films and other audiovisual programming for distribution across television, home video and streaming media.

== History ==
In November 2003, IDT Corporation, a telecommunications company based in New Jersey, formed an audiovisual entertainment division known as IDT Entertainment following Digital Production Solutions (DPS)' acquisition of a controlling interest in animation studio Film Roman in May and a minor interest in Vanguard Animation in July. Later on in December, it acquired Troy, Michigan-based home video distributor Anchor Bay Entertainment, and a stake in Mainframe Entertainment, it then formed the NorthStar Entertainment Group, a joint venture with the Christian Broadcasting Network (CBN), and in January 2004, IDT bought a stake in Archie Comics, then in March, IDT's DPS also acquired Toronto-based DKP Studios for an undisclosed price and turned it into their own animation studio.

In May 2004, IDT Entertainment announced that it would acquire Manga Entertainment and a minority share in POW! Entertainment with exclusive distribution rights to POW's animated DVD properties and joint development of 6 cartoon films. In June 2004, IDT Entertainment founded its international sales division, IDT Entertainment Sales (later renamed as Starz Worldwide). In 2005, IDT signed a distribution deal with 20th Century Fox to release IDT's animated films in North America over a two-year pact; starting with Yankee Irving, which would be retitled as Everyone's Hero and was released in September 2006. On May 16, 2006, IDT agreed to sell its IDT Entertainment division to Liberty Media (then-owners of the Starz Entertainment Group) "for all of Liberty Media's interests in IDT, $186 million in cash and the assumption of existing indebtedness." On August 31, 2006, the sale of all of IDT Entertainment's US operations and several international operations was completed. "The remainder of the deal, to include the Canadian and Australian operations, is expected to be closed in the next few weeks after regulatory approval has been given." This sale was completed on September 29, 2006. Liberty then merged IDT Entertainment and its divisions with the Starz cable network to form Starz Media.

On January 4, 2011, The Weinstein Company purchased a 25% stake in the operating unit. While not including TV rights, the deal spans Blu-ray, DVD and VOD, pay-per-view and digital distribution and covers up to 20 TWC and Dimension titles per year. They include The King's Speech, Blue Valentine and The Company Men. Starz acquired the 25% stake owned by Weinstein in October 2015.

On January 11, 2013, Liberty Media Corporation completed the "spin-off" of its Starz Entertainment segment as a separate entity. Under this new structure, the entity that was known as "Starz Media" became Starz Distribution.

In November 2015, Waterman Entertainment purchased Film Roman from Starz Distribution.

On December 8, 2016, Lionsgate purchased Starz Inc. for $4.4 billion. As part of the acquisition by Lionsgate, Starz Distribution was folded into Lionsgate's respective home entertainment and television distribution units.

== Former assets ==
- Mainframe Studios (now owned by Wow Unlimited Media)
- Film Roman (now owned by Waterman Entertainment)
  - Digital Production Solutions (DPS)
  - Global Animation Studio - a division of DPS
- Arc Productions (now owned by Blue Ant Media as Jam Filled Entertainment’s Toronto office).
- POW! Entertainment (5%, now owned by Camsing International Holding)
- Anchor Bay Entertainment (folded into Lionsgate Home Entertainment)
- Manga Entertainment - distribution of anime (transferred to Lionsgate Home Entertainment)
- Union Pool

Starz Distribution previously held minority stakes in:

- Vanguard Animation (minority interest);
- Joint venture with NorthStar Entertainment Group, Inc., a subsidiary of the Christian Broadcasting Network.

== Live-action films ==
- Jericho (2001)
- It Waits (2006)
- Room 6 (2006)
- Dead and Deader (2006)
- Queen Sized (2008)
- Lower Learning (2008)
- Blue Seduction (2009)
- Table for Three (2009)
- The Dog Who Saved Christmas (2009)
- A Nanny for Christmas (2010)
- The Dog Who Saved Christmas Vacation (2010)
- The Dog Who Saved Halloween (2011)
- Flock of Dudes (2017)

== Animated films ==
Starz Distribution/IDT Entertainment have been in charge of the animation production or distribution of the following films:

Theatrical

- Hair High (2004; with Plymptoons) (distribution only)
- Everyone's Hero (2006; with 20th Century Fox) (international distribution only)
- The Pirates Who Don't Do Anything: A VeggieTales Movie (2008; with Big Idea Productions & Universal Pictures)
- Space Chimps (2008; with Vanguard Animation & 20th Century Fox) (international distribution only)
- 9 (2009; with Focus Features)

TV specials

- The Happy Elf (2005; with Film Roman and NBC)
- Wubbzy's Big Movie! (2008; with Bolder Media and Film Roman)
- Wow! Wow! Wubbzy!: Wubb Idol (2009; with Bolder Media and Film Roman)

Direct-to-video

- Hellboy: Sword of Storms (2006; with Revolution Studios)
- Stan Lee Presents: Mosaic (2007; with POW Entertainment & Anchor Bay)
- Turok: Son of Stone (2008; with Classic Media, Film Roman, and Genius Products)
- The Haunted World of El Superbeasto (2009; with Film Roman, Carbunckle Cartoons, and Anchor Bay Films)
- Dante's Inferno: An Animated Epic (2010; with Production I.G)
- The Legend of Secret Pass (2010; with JC2 Animated Entertainment)
- Dead Space: Aftermath (2011; with Pumpkin Studio, Visceral Games, & Electronic Arts)
