= Union Pool =

Comedy channel

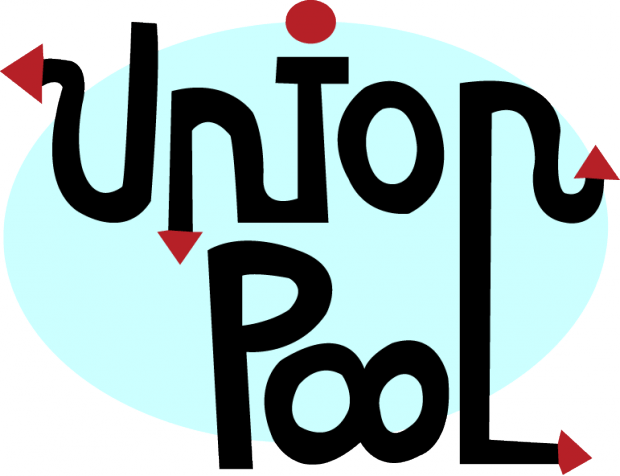
- Network: YouTube

Programming
- Language: English

Ownership
- Owner: Starz Digital Media

History
- Launched: August 27, 2013; 13 years ago
- Closed: May 29, 2015; 11 years ago

Availability

Streaming media
- YouTube: Union Pool

Union Pool was an American YouTube comedy channel which hosted animation and live action shows. It launched in 2013 and ceased in 2015.

== Programming ==
- Tvoovies
- Hollywood Acting Studio
- Captain Cornelius
- Popcorn Addicts
- Llama Cops
