= Wow! Wow! Wubbzy! =

American animated children's television series

- Genre: Comedy
- Created by: Bob Boyle
- Based on: The Tail of Flopsy, Mopsy, and Ted by Viviana Ogawa
- Voices of: Grey DeLisle; Lara Jill Miller; Carlos Alazraqui; Tara Strong (S2)
- Theme music composer: Brad Mossman
- Opening theme: "Wow! Wow! Wubbzy! Theme"
- Ending theme: "Wow! Wow! Wubbzy! Theme" (instrumental)
- Composers: Mike Reagan; Mark Cross (S1)
- Country of origin: United States
- Original language: English
- No. of seasons: 2
- No. of episodes: 52 (104 segments) (list of episodes)

Production
- Executive producers: Bob Boyle; Susan Miller; Fred Seibert; Steve Brown; Morris Berger; John W. Hyde (S1); Ted Green (S1); Scott Greenberg (S1); Kent Rice (S2); Jay Fukuto (S2)
- Producer: Andrea Romero (S1)
- Editors: Mechele Boyett (S1); Bill Charnega (S2)
- Running time: 23–24 minutes (8–10 minutes per segment)
- Production companies: Bolder Media; IDT Entertainment (2006–2007); Starz Media (2007–2010)

Original release
- Network: Noggin/Nick Jr. Channel
- Release: August 21, 2006 – February 21, 2010
- Network: Nickelodeon
- Release: August 28, 2006 – May 1, 2009

Wow! Wow! Wubbzy! is an American animated children's television series created by Bob Boyle. The show was produced by Bolder Media (a joint venture of Frederator Studios and the Mixed Media Group) and Starz Media in association with Film Roman for Nickelodeon. The show was animated by Bardel Entertainment using Toon Boom and Adobe Flash software. Bob Boyle, Susan Miller, and Fred Seibert served as executive producers.

Two seasons were produced, totaling 52 episodes (each consisting of two segments). Starz Media (currently Lionsgate Television) owns and distributes the series. The show has received an Emmy, a KidScreen Best TV Movie award (for Wubb Idol, starring Beyoncé), and a Telly award.

Wow! Wow! Wubbzy! is available to stream for free on Tubi, The Roku Channel, YouTube, and Plex.

== Premise ==
The show focuses on an anthropomorphic yellow gerbil-like creature named Wubbzy, who gets into various antics with his friends Widget, a pink rabbit-like creature who loves to build; Walden, a purple bear-like creature who is a brainiac; and since the second season, Daizy, a teal dog-like creature who loves flowers. They live in the town of Wuzzleburg, a fictional location with lots of creatures of every type, and all kinds of events happening in it.

== Episodes ==
Season	Segments	Episodes	Originally released	
Season	Segments	Episodes	First released	Last released
1	52	26	August 21, 2006	June 20, 2008
Specials	N/A	2	August 29, 2008	May 1, 2009
2	52	26	September 2, 2008	February 21, 2010

At the end of most episodes of the series, there are songs, composed and sung by Brad Mossman with lyrics by creator Bob Boyle, whose topics that involve social skills, such as friendship, are related to those episodes.

== Characters ==
=== Main ===
- Wubbzy (voiced by Grey DeLisle) is a yellow gerbil-like creature. He is small, energetic, friendly, and obsessed with his bendy tail, on which he can bounce like a pogo stick.
- Widget (voiced by Lara Jill Miller) is a pink rabbit-like creature. She is a mechanical whiz with a heavy Southern accent. She is a great builder and engineer who has built all sorts of inventions.
- Walden (voiced by Carlos Alazraqui) is a purple bear-like creature who speaks with an Australian accent. He is a polymath, brainiac, and scientist. His intellectualism and love for science, books and art are a common thread in the show.
- Daizy (voiced by Tara Strong) is a cheerful teal dog-like creature who is Wubbzy's neighbor, classmate and best friend. As her name suggests, she loves flowers. She was introduced in the second season.

=== Supporting ===
- Buggy, Huggy and Earl (voiced by Grey DeLisle, Lara Jill Miller, and Carlos Alazraqui) are three friends of Wubbzy and Daizy who sometimes hang out with them when Widget and Walden aren't available. Buggy is cyan, Huggy is blue, and Earl is orange.
- Kooky Kid (voiced by Grey DeLisle) is an orange creature who appears whenever something bizarre happens, stating that it is "kooky" while wiggling his fingers.
- Policeman (voiced by Carlos Alazraqui) is a light orange-colored resident who is a police officer.
- Chef Fritz (voiced by Carlos Alazraqui) is an orange-colored resident who is a chef. He speaks with an Italian accent.
- Madame Zabinga (voiced by Grey DeLisle) is a yellow-colored resident who is the sole teacher at the local ballet school. She speaks with a French accent.
- Mayor Whoozle (voiced by Carlos Alazraqui) is the eccentrically-dressed, green-skinned mayor of Wuzzleburg.
- Miss Bookfinder (voiced by Grey DeLisle) is a light-blue librarian of the Wuzzleburg Library. She is first seen in "A Little Help from Your Friends".
- Moo Moo (voiced by Carlos Alazraqui) is a magician in Wuzzleburg. He is first seen in "Magic Tricks", where he helps Wubbzy learn to do magic tricks.
- Jukebox Robot (voiced by Brad Mossman) is a blue and purple robot. He loves to sing and dance. He works as a jukebox for the Wubb Club. He was introduced in the second season.

=== Minor ===
- Shine, Shimmer and Sparkle (voiced by Beyoncé, Tara Strong, and Grey DeLisle) are pop singers known as the Wubb Girlz. All three have sky-blue skins. Shine has blonde hair, Shimmer has pink hair, and Sparkle has green hair. They are only seen in the "Wubb Idol" arc.
- Ty Ty (voiced by Ty Pennington) is an orange-colored resident with a love of building who is Widget's friend. He is only seen in "Ty Ty the Tool Guy".
- News Reporter (voiced by Carlos Alazraqui) is a red-orange-colored news reporter in Wuzzleburg. He is only seen in "Wubbzy Tells a Whopper" , "Widget Gets the Blooey Blues", and "Too Much of a Doodle Thing!".
- Growlygus (voiced by Grey DeLisle) is a red monster who supposedly took Widget's whammer-hammer. He is only seen in "Wubbzy Tells a Whopper".

== Reception ==
Larisa Wiseman of Common Sense Media rated the program 3 out of 5 stars, saying "the storylines are simple, engaging, and funny, and the characters are cute and energetic". Furthermore, Wiseman said that it's "likely that some young viewers will be bored by the flat visuals, but hopefully they'll watch long enough to absorb the show's positive messages".

== Broadcast ==
Lionsgate Television currently holds most distribution rights. In the United States, Nickelodeon had aired the series and in Canada, Treehouse TV had aired episodes before moving to Playhouse Disney (later Disney Junior). The last airing on Nickelodeon was on December 20, 2010. The last airing on the Nick Jr. Channel was on April 14, 2014 when Nickelodeon and Paramount Global's broadcast rights in the United States expired. All mentions of the show were completely removed from the Nick Jr. website. Since that time, Starz/Lionsgate has been the only worldwide distributor.

=== International ===
Wow! Wow! Wubbzy! has aired internationally. In Latin America, the series was aired initially on Discovery Kids Latin America from October 8, 2007 to 2016.

It also aired on TG4 in Ireland, DR2 in Denmark, Baraem TV in Arab countries, Super RTL in Germany, Hop! Channel in Israel, and Discovery Kids in Latin America and Brazil. The series is shown on Canal Panda, Clan, RaiSat Yoyo in Italy, RTP2 in Portugal and Spain, and from 2007 to 2011 on ABC1 and ABC Kids in Australia.

A British English dub was aired on Nick Jr. from May 5, 2007 to January 1, 2012. A translated version of the series has been a popular addition to the "Cúla4" children's programming lineup on the Irish language television channel TG4 since January 2011. The show has been dubbed in 15 languages and aired in over 100 countries around the world.

== Home media ==
In the UK and Australia, Season 1, Volumes 1–2 (Episodes 1–13, and 14–26) were released as season DVD boxes; these were not released in the United States.

Starz's now-defunct subsidiary, Anchor Bay Entertainment (Lionsgate Home Entertainment), has released 21 DVD compilations, the first of which was released on September 23, 2008.

Title	Season(s)	Episode count	Release date	Episodes
A Tale of Tails	1	8	September 23, 2008	"A Tale of Tails", "Special Delivery", "Widget's Wild Ride", "Attack of the 50-Foot Fleegle", "Come Spy with Me", "Wubbzy Tells a Whopper", "Mt. Fizzy Pop", and "Puddle Muddle"
A Little Help from My Friends	1	8	February 3, 2009	"A Little Help from Your Friends", "Clean Sweep", "Mr. Cool", "Wubbzy in the Middle", "Gidget the Super Robot", "Broken Record", "Widget Gets the Blooey Blues", and "Where's My Wiggle Wrench?"
Wubbzy's Big Movie!	1	8	May 12, 2009	"Wubbzy's Big Movie!"
Pirate Treasure	1, 2	7	March 24, 2009	"Pirate Treasure", "Wubbzy in the Woods", "Walden on the Beach", "The Grass Is Always Plaider", "Goo Goo Grief!", "Everything's Coming Up Wubbzy", and "Save the Wuzzly"
Wubbzy Goes Boo!	1, 2	6	September 8, 2009	"Wubbzy's Magical Mess-Up", "Tea for Three", "Monster Madness", "The Last Leaf", "The Ghost of Wuzzleburg", and "March of the Pumpkins"
Wubbzy's Christmas Adventure	1, 2	6	October 20, 2009	"Snow Day", "O' Figgity Fig Tree", "The Snow Shoo Shoo", "Dash for Dolly", "Great and Grumpy Holiday", and "The Super Special Gift"
Go for Gold!	1, 2	7	February 16, 2010	"Run for Fun", "What a Card", "The Wubbzy Shuffle", "Hoop Dreamz", "Wubbzy's Big Idea", "Rush Hour", and "The Tired Tail"
Wubbzy Goes Green	1, 2	5	April 6, 2010	"Save the Wuzzly", "All Bottled Up", "Too Much of a Doodle Thing!", "Zoo Hullabaloo", and "The Flight of the Flutterfly"
Escape from Dino Island	1, 2	7	May 4, 2010	"Escape from Dino Island", "Wubbzy the Hero", "Call of the Mild", "Wubbzy and the Sparkle Stone", "Daizy's Purple Thumb", "Mt. Fizzy Pop", and "Too Much of a Doodle Thing!"
Wubbzy Goes to School	1, 2	6	August 3, 2010	"Who Needs School", "Gotta Dance", "Magic Tricks", "Wubbzy the Star", "New Kid on the Block", and "You Gotta Have Art"
Fly Us to the Moon	1, 2	6	November 16, 2010	"Warp Speed Wubbzy", "Fly Us to the Moon", "Tooth or Dare", "Wonder Wubbzy", "The Super Fixers", and "All Bottled Up"
Wubbzy Be Mine	1, 2	3	January 4, 2011	"Mr. Valentine", "Cupid's Little Helper", and "My Speedy Valentine"
Wubbzy's Egg-Cellent Easter	1, 2	6	March 1, 2011	"Eggs Over Easy", "Big Bunny Blues", "Flower Day Parade", "Watch the Birdie", "Wubbzy Bounces Back", and "The Flight of the Flutterfly"
Wubbzy Saves the Day	1, 2	6	May 3, 2011	"Follow the Leader", "Bye Bye Birdies", "Moo Moo's Snoozity Snooze", "Woozy Walden", "The Nasty Nose", and "Daizy's Favorite Place"
Wubbzy and the Fire Engine	1, 2	6	September 13, 2011	"Wubbzy and the Fire Engine", "What Would Wubbzy Do?", "Ty Ty the Tool Guy", "Mr. Unlucky", "Wuzzleburg Express", and "Hangin' with Mr. Gummy"
The Wubb Club	1, 2	7	January 3, 2012	"The Wubb Club", "Who's That Girl?", "Wubbzy's Big Move", "Wubbzy's Rainy Day", "Daizy's Hair Salon", "Quiet Wubbzy!", and "Meet the Wuzzles"
A Wuzzleburg Tale	2	6	April 3, 2012	"Once Upon a Wubbzy", "Big Birthday Mystery", "Welcome to the Dollhouse", "Happily Ever After", "Too Many Wubbzys", and "Focus Wubbzy"
Best of Wubbzy	1, 2	7	September 18, 2012	"Follow the Leader", "The Wubbzy Shuffle", "Wubbzy the Star", "Tooth or Dare", "Wubbzy's Big Makeover", "Wubbzy Bounces Back!", and "Wubbzy the Hero"
Best of Widget	1	7	January 8, 2013	"Widget's Wild Ride", "Gotta Dance", "Gidget the Super Robot", "Eggs Over Easy", "Widget Gets the Blooey Blues", "The Super Fixers", and "Where's My Wiggle Wrench?"
Best of Walden	1, 2	7	April 9, 2013	"Perfecto Party", "Mr. Cool", "Walden on the Beach", "Woozy Walden", "Goo Goo Grief", "The Last Leaf", and "Come Spy With Me"
Best of Daizy	2	7	July 9, 2013	"Who's That Girl?", "Welcome to the Dollhouse", "Daizy's Hair Salon", "Daizy's Favorite Place", "Wonder Wubbzy", "Daizy's Purple Thumb", and "Once Upon a Wubbzy"
