= Fred Stroppel =

American dramatist

Fred Stroppel is an American playwright and film writer based in New York City. He has been writing for television, film and theater for over twenty years.

== Credits ==
=== Theater ===
Stroppel, a member of the Theatre Artist Workshop, has had productions of his work at the Ensemble Studio Theatre, the John Houseman Theater, The Actor's Playhouse, the West Bank Cafe and the 29th Street Repertory Theater, all in New York City. His musical "Tales from the Manhattan Woods", based on Strauss' Die Fledermaus, recently completed a successful run at the Wings Theatre. Stroppel's full-length comedy "Fortune's Fools" was produced off-Broadway at the Cherry Lane Theater and "Actor!" his satire of the entertainment world, was staged at the Egyptian Arena Theatre in Los Angeles. Fred is also in collaboration with Brett Somers frequently and wrote a trio of comedies called "Danger, People at Large" for her and her ex-husband, Jack Klugman. Most recently, he is writing the book for a new, original musical - "The Girl in the Red Dress" - whose composers are Maia Sharp, Buddy Mondlock, and Art Garfunkel.

=== Television and film ===
Having worked in television for HBO, Disney, Nickelodeon and PBS, Stroppel has written several screenplays, including "David Mamet's Gilded Stones", a short film based on his one-act play "The Mamet Women", which was an official selection at the 2004 Sundance Film Festival. Fred has written for Wow! Wow! Wubbzy! and A Little Curious. For film, Fred has written Brooklyn State of Mind starring Tony Danza, Jennifer Esposito, and Vincent Spano, and Dark Side of Genius starring Moon Unit Zappa. For theater, Fred has written Brainstorms, which was a one-act comedy produced by A Small Company in America Productions.
