= Victor Bumbalo =

American actor and playwright

- Born: November 30, 1948 (age 77); Utica, New York
- Occupations: Playwright, screenwriter

Victor Bumbalo (born November 30, 1948) is an American actor and playwright.

== Early life and education ==
Bumbalo graduated from the Masters Program in Theater at Bennington College. In New York City, Bumbalo became immersed in the off-Broadway and off-off Broadway theater scene. He directed the American premiere of Mrozek's The Enchanted Night and became the artistic director of the Soul and Latin Theater, one of the first successful street theaters. Their productions toured the streets of New York for four consecutive summers.

== Career ==
As a gay man, he felt the need to put the lives of gay people on the stage. He wrote Kitchen Duty, produced by John Glines. Then came Niagara Falls, a comedy about a working-class family's reaction to their gay son and his lover arriving unexpectedly for his sister's wedding. This play has enjoyed a long life, playing in both mainstream and alternative theaters.

In the 1980s, he received two MacDowell Fellowships and a Yaddo and Helene Wurlitzer Residency.

Then the era of AIDS began. Almost everyone involved with Kitchen Duty died of the disease. Bumbalo volunteered with GMHC where he headed a team that took care of people with AIDS. He worked with the Anti-Violence Project and tried to avoid writing. Finally, confronting his demons, an award from the Ingram Merrill Foundation allowed him to complete Adam and the Experts, his first play dealing with AIDS. It was loosely based on his relationship with his friend, the novelist and journalist, George Whitmore, and their search for a way out of the nightmare. The New York Times said of the play "it is the most important play to deal with the AIDS crisis in gay society since William Hoffman's As Is and Larry Kramer's The Normal Heart. After the successful Off-Broadway run, the play has had numerous productions in the United States, England, and Canada.

What Are Tuesdays Like? follows a set of strangers in the waiting room of an AIDS clinic over several months. Bumbalo was able to expand the world of HIV and deal with issues of class, gender, and race. The play was featured at the Carnegie Mellon Showcase of New Plays and premiered at the Contemporary American Theater Festival. The play has had productions throughout the United States, Germany, Japan, England, Costa Rica, and Sweden.

In 1995, David Milch, executive producer of NYPD Blue, having seen a reading of What Are Tuesdays Like?, invited Bumbalo to write an episode for his series. He moved from New York to Los Angeles.

The success of his NYPD Blue episode led to a staff writing position on American Gothic. Since then, he has written several movies of the week and a number of episodes for network television series. In addition, Bumbalo wrote for HBO's animated series Spawn.

Questa opened at the Court Theatre in Los Angeles. The play was produced by David Milch and starred Wendie Malick, Dan Lauria, and Dorian Harewood. It was a 2007 finalist for the Lambda Literary Awards. Margo Jefferson, Pulitzer Prize–winning critic, said of the play "it is a wonder ... the talents of Victor Bumbalo—the comic charm, the moral courage, the range of characters—are in perfect accord.

Bumbalo has served on the playwriting committee for the Massachusetts State Arts Council. Most of Bumbalo's plays are published. Show, Tell, Kitchen Duty, and After Eleven appear in various anthologies. Show can also be found in Applause's collection of Best American Short Plays. Adam and the Experts, Niagara Falls, What Are Tuesdays Like?, and Questa are published by Broadway Play Publishing Inc.

Most recently he wrote and directed a short film, Two Boys. It has appeared in many festivals throughout the United States and won the Jury Award for Best Drama at the Beverly Hills Shorts Festival (2011) and Best Director at the ITN Distribution Film Festival (2012).

Outside of his theatre work, Bumbalo also appeared in an ad campaign for Orgy of the Living Dead, a theatrical reissue package created by Europix International in the early 70s combining the films Kill, Baby, Kill, The Murder Clinic, and Malenka under new titles and in abbreviated edits. Bumbalo appeared in the trailer and promotional ads as "John Austin Frazier", a man who was driven to insanity as a result of viewing the triple feature of "Living Dead" films. The campaign was created by his friend and future writer/director Alan Ormsby.

== Bibliography ==
Bumbalo, Victor (2010) What Are Tuesdays Like? Broadway Play Pub ISBN 978-0-88145-418-5

Bumbalo, Victor (2007) Niagara Falls Broadway Play Pub ISBN 978-0-88145-365-2

- Bumbalo, Victor (2006), Questa, Broadway Play Pub, ISBN 978-0-88145-280-8, OCLC 76869566
- Bumbalo, Victor; Shengold, Nina (1995), "What Are Tuesdays Like?", in Eric Lane (ed.), The actor's book of gay and lesbian plays, Penguin Books, ISBN 978-0-14-024552-3, OCLC 32626627
- Bumbalo, Victor (1994), "What Are Tuesdays Like?", in Jones, Therese (ed.), Sharing the delirium : second generation AIDS plays and performances, Heinemann, ISBN 978-0-435-08633-6
- Bumbalo, Victor (1993), "Show", in Howard Stein and Glenn Young (ed.), The Best American Short Plays, 1992-1993, Best American short plays series, Applause Theatre Books, ISBN 978-1-55783-167-5
- Bumbalo, Victor (1993), "Tell", in Helbing, Terry (ed.), Gay and lesbian plays today, Heinemann, ISBN 978-0-435-08618-3
- Bumbalo, Victor (1992), "Show", in Barnes, Noreen C; Deutsch, Nicholas (eds.), Tough acts to follow : one-act plays on the gay/Lesbian experience, Alamo Square Press, ISBN 978-0-9624751-6-0
- Bumbalo, Victor (1990), Adam and the experts, Broadway Play Pub, ISBN 978-0-88145-087-3, OCLC 23190939
- Bumbalo, Victor (1984), Niagara Falls and other plays, Calamus Books, ISBN 978-0-930762-07-0, OCLC 11493817
