= Bolder Media =

American media company known for children's media

Bolder Media, Inc.
- Logo used since 2003
- Type: Joint venture
- Founded: 2003; 23 years ago
- Founders: Susan Miller; Fred Seibert
- Headquarters: New York City, United States
- Key people: Fred Seibert
- Products: Wow! Wow! Wubbzy!
- Parent: Mixed Media Group; Frederator Studios
- Website: boldermedia.com (archived at the Wayback Machine)

Bolder Media, Inc. (also known as Bolder Media for Boys and Girls or simply Bolder Media) is an American production company that is a joint venture between Frederator Studios and Mixed Media Group.

Founded in 2003 by television producers Susan Miller and Fred Seibert, the company develops books, television series, and films for children. It produced Bob Boyle's animated preschool series Wow! Wow! Wubbzy! for Nick Jr., the only show the company has ever produced. Along with Wow! Wow! Wubbzy!, the company has also produced the show's books, which have been published by Scholastic and other publishers.
