= Carlos Alazraqui =

American actor (born 1962)

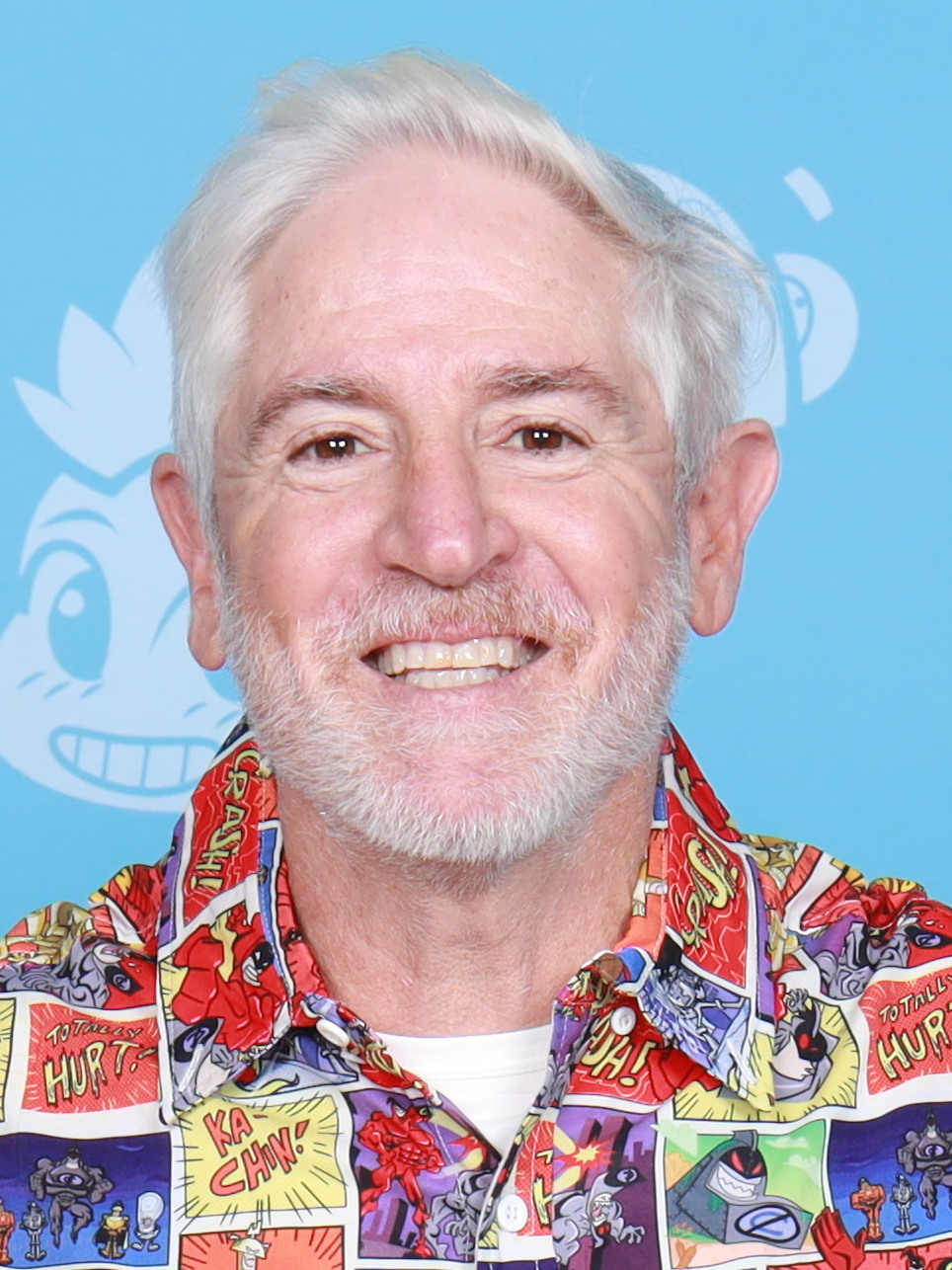
- Alazraqui at Animate! Philadelphia in 2025
- Born: Carlos Jaime Alazraqui; July 20, 1962 (age 64); Yonkers, New York, U.S.
- Other names: Carlos Jaime Alazraqui; Carlos J. Alazraqui; Dennis O'Connor; Carlos Higgins
- Education: California State University, Sacramento
- Occupations: Actor; stand-up comedian; impressionist
- Years active: 1982–present
- Spouse: Laura Mala (m. 2010)
- Children: 2

Comedy career
- Medium: Stand-up; film; television; music
- Genres: Observational comedy; musical comedy; character comedy; clean comedy; impressions
- Subject: Pop culture
- Website: www.carlosalazraqui.com

Signature
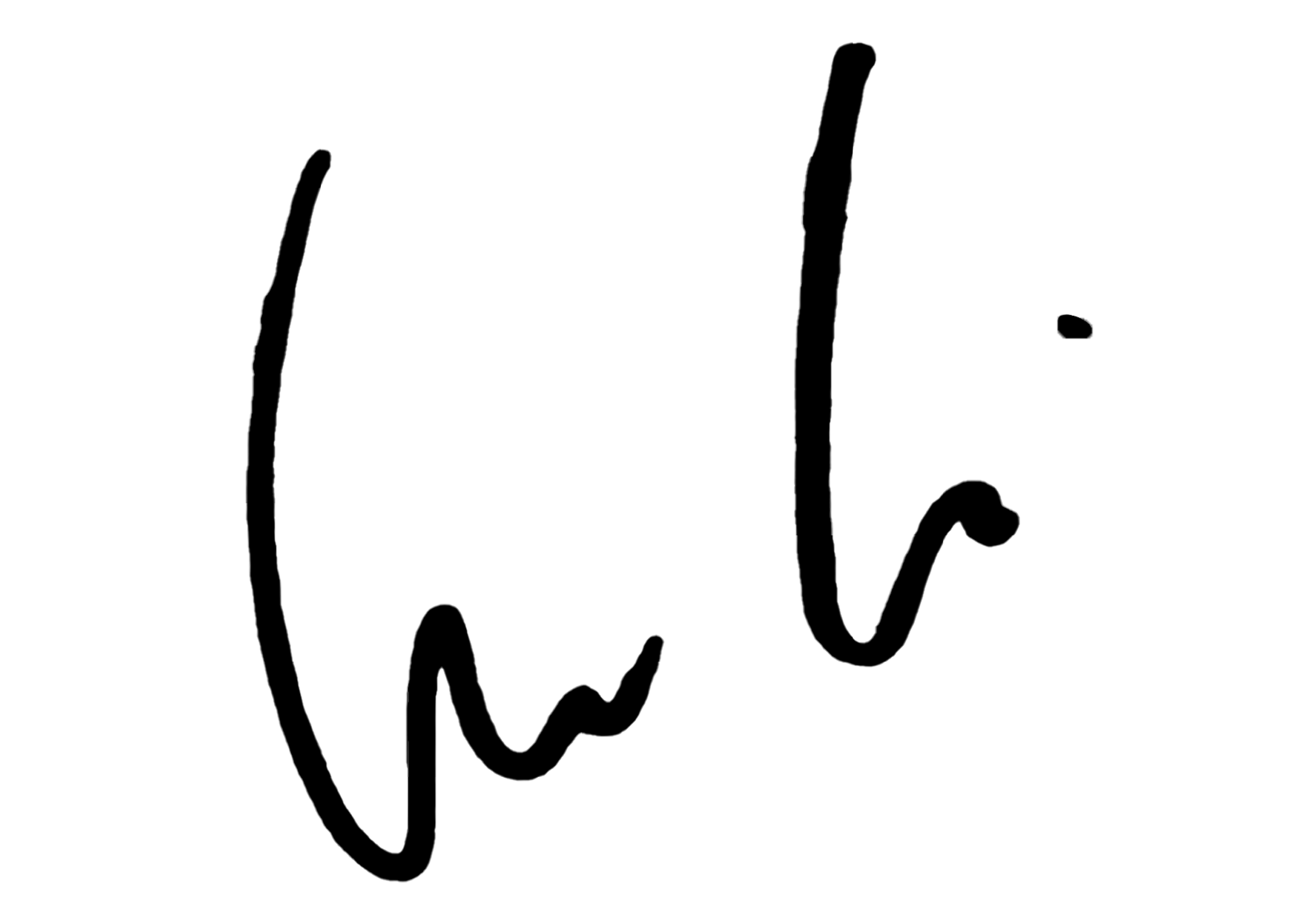

Carlos Jaime Alazraqui (born July 20, 1962) is an American actor and comedian. His voice acting roles include the original voice of Spyro from Spyro the Dragon, the Taco Bell chihuahua in the Taco Bell commercials, Rocko on Rocko's Modern Life and Rocko's Modern Life: Static Cling, Denzel Crocker on The Fairly OddParents, Lazlo and Clam on Camp Lazlo, Winslow on CatDog, Puma Loco on El Tigre: The Adventures of Manny Rivera, Rikochet on ¡Mucha Lucha!, Felipe on Handy Manny, Walden on Wow! Wow! Wubbzy!, Paco on Maya & Miguel, Carlos on The Casagrandes, Scissors on Rock Paper Scissors, and the Disney character Panchito Pistoles since 2001. He is a weekly contributor on The Stephanie Miller Show. In live action, Alazraqui is known for playing Deputy James Garcia on Reno 911!

== Early life ==
Carlos Jaime Alazraqui was born in Yonkers, New York on July 20, 1962, to Argentine parents. He has Sephardic Jewish heritage from his father. His mother was a Methodist minister. He moved with his family to Concord, California, at an early age. Alazraqui graduated from Concord High School. He attended college at California State University, Sacramento from 1982 to 1986, where he began competing in open mic contests. After winning in his fourth year, Alazraqui took his prize money and moved to Los Angeles.

== Career ==
=== Stand-up comedy ===
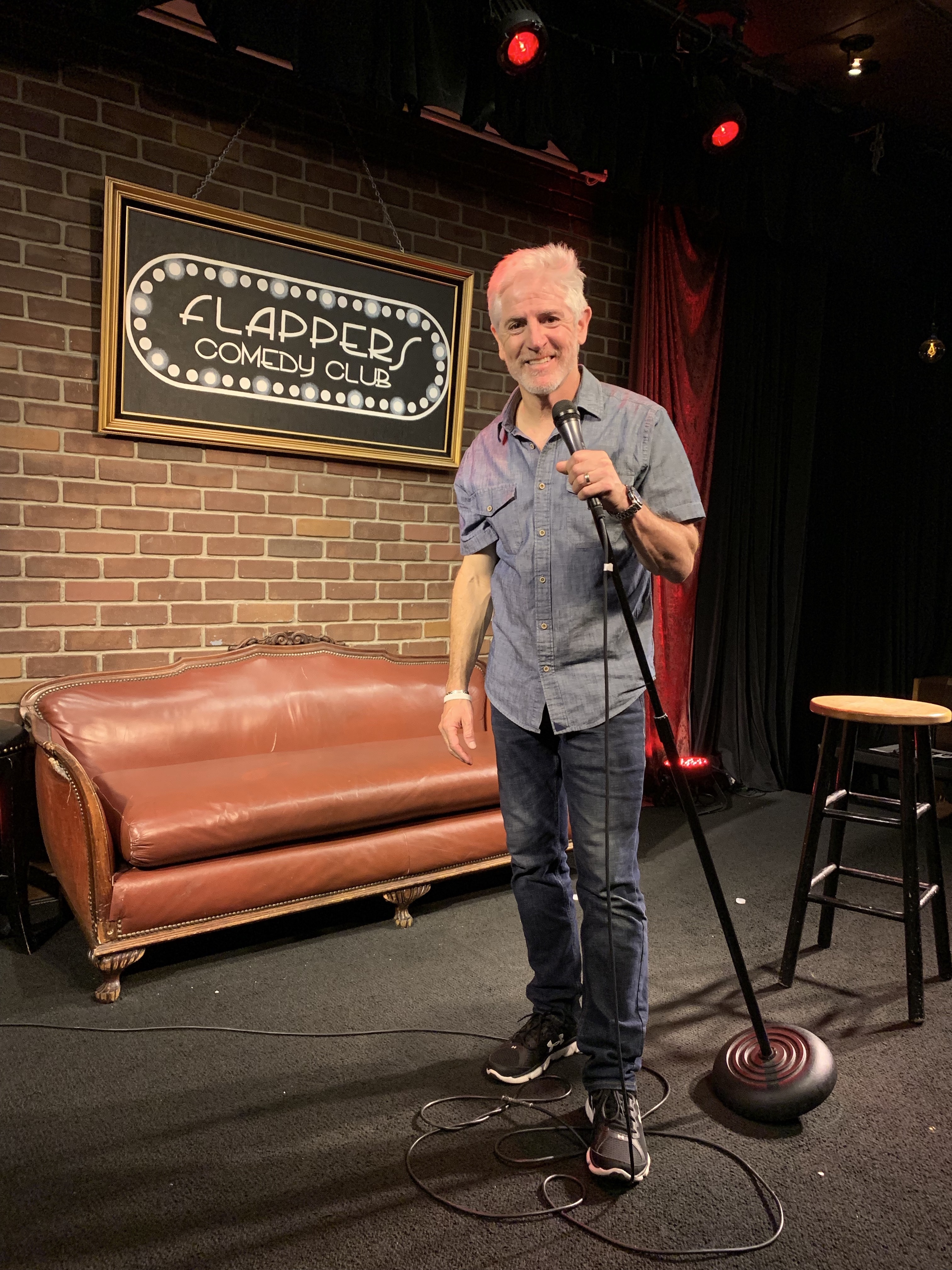
Alazraqui on stage at Flappers Comedy Club in Burbank, 2019.

Alazraqui originally began his career in stand-up comedy, he was the winner of the San Francisco Comedy Competition in 1993. He beat out fellow comedians Marc Maron and Patton Oswalt.

In addition, Alazraqui joined Miller's Sexy Liberal Comedy Tour in 2014, playing some of the dates with Jim Ward and he has a semi-regular segment on Miller's radio show Coffee with Carlos.

=== Film and television ===
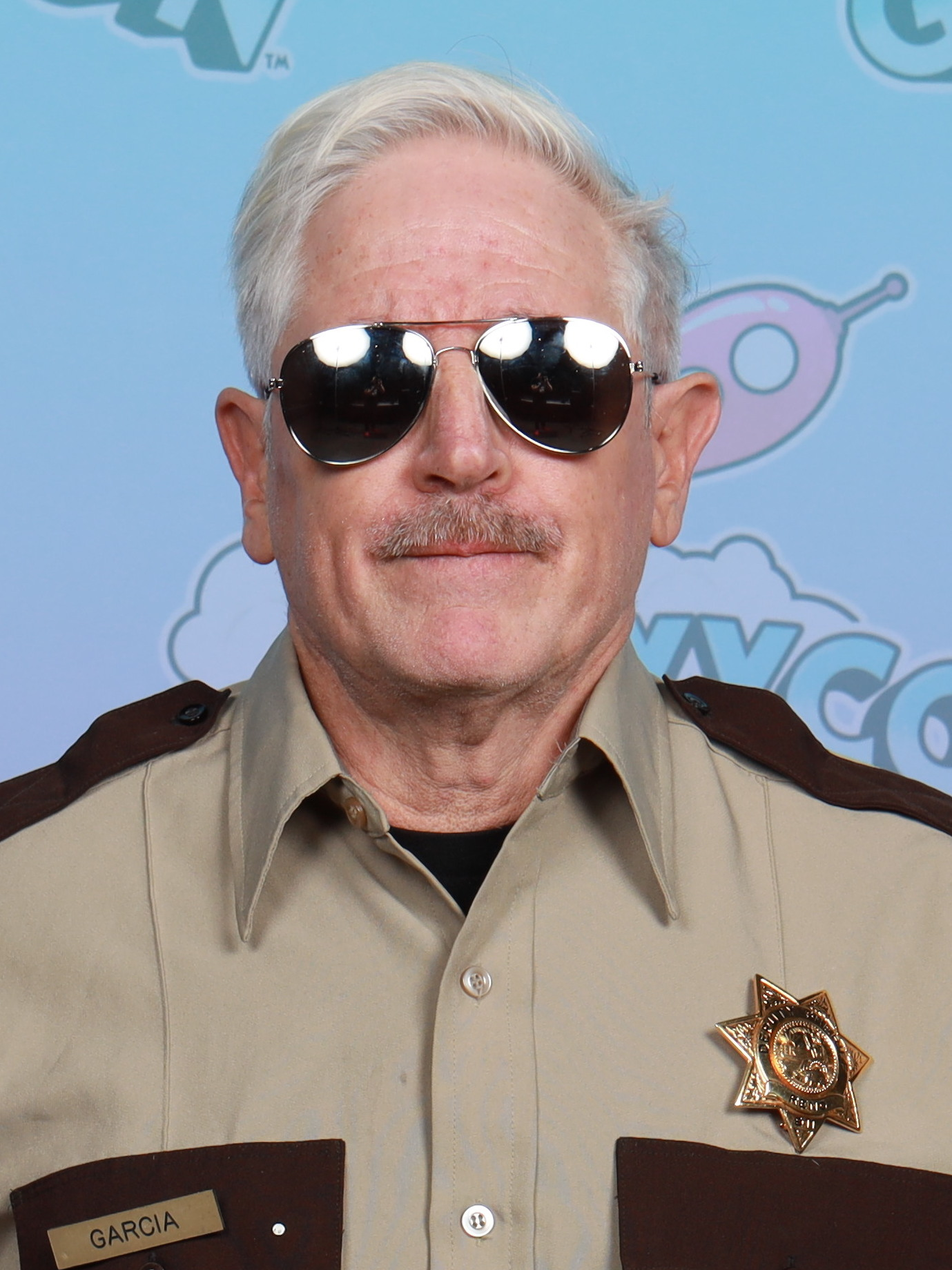
Alazraqui at GalaxyCon Richmond in 2025 as his Reno 911 character Deputy James Garcia.

Alazraqui is known for his live-action work in Reno 911!, in which he portrayed Deputy James Garcia for five seasons (2003–2008). He played the same role in the series' 2007 spinoff film Reno 911! Miami. As a nod to this role, he also played a "bumbling" Reno cop in the CSI: Crime Scene Investigation episode "Let it Bleed". He has been a celebrity on the Tom Bergeron version of Hollywood Squares.

Alazraqui also wrote and starred in The Last White Dishwasher, a short film.

In 2020, Alazraqui reprised his role as Deputy James Oswaldo Garcia in the seventh season of Reno 911! which aired on Quibi. He also appeared in the 2021 Paramount+ movie, Reno 911! The Hunt for QAnon. The eighth season of the series, now titled Reno 911! Defunded, premiered on The Roku Channel in February 2022.

He reprised his role as Denzel Crocker in The Fairly OddParents: Fairly Odder, a live-action sequel to The Fairly OddParents, which premiered on Paramount+ in March 2022.

=== Voice acting ===
Alazraqui has performed several voices for Nickelodeon cartoons, including Rocko on Rocko's Modern Life, as well as Denzel Crocker and Juandissimo Magnifico on The Fairly OddParents, Winslow T. Oddfellow and Lube on CatDog, Scooter on SpongeBob SquarePants, and Scissors on Rock, Paper, Scissors. He also voiced several additional voices for the Cartoon Network shows, Cow and Chicken, Kidscity: The Village Dome of Kids, and I Am Weasel during their runs in the mid-late 1990s. He also voiced Spyro in Spyro the Dragon. He was later replaced by Tom Kenny as Spyro in Spyro 2: Ripto's Rage!, Spyro: Year of the Dragon and Spyro: Enter the Dragonfly. In 1997, he voiced Crash Bandicoot in promotional trailers for the game Crash Bandicoot 2: Cortex Strikes Back, also switching out live performances as him with Tom Kenny at E3 1997. He also voiced the Taco Bell chihuahua in the Taco Bell commercials, Rikochet in the first two seasons of ¡Mucha Lucha! and Mr. Weed (the head of the "Happy Go Lucky" toy factory) on Family Guy. It is mentioned in the DVD commentary track that Alazraqui was reluctant to leave Family Guy. In particular, Seth MacFarlane suggests that the death of Alazraqui's character took the actor by surprise. He also voiced Dr. Julius No in GoldenEye: Rogue Agent.

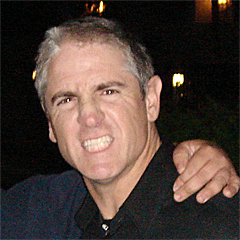
Alazraqui in 2005

In 2004, he voiced Paco the Parrot on the PBS Kids series Maya & Miguel and in 2005, he added the voices for two Cartoon Network series: The Life and Times of Juniper Lee where he played Monroe, a guardian dog with a Scottish accent and three characters in Camp Lazlo: Lazlo, Clam and Chef McMuesli to his credits. In 2006, he added Salty Mike from Squirrel Boy and Walden in Wow! Wow! Wubbzy! on Nick Jr.. He played Wisk in Glen Hill's 2000 film version of L. Frank Baum's The Life and Adventures of Santa Claus. He also provided the voice of Nestor in the Happy Feet films. He has also voiced the Hanna-Barbera characters Baba Looey, Mudsy the Funky Phantom, and Loopy De Loop in modern appearances.

Jeff "Swampy" Marsh, a storyboard writer for Rocko's Modern Life, described Alazraqui's normal voice as bearing "no accent at all". Marsh describes Alazraqui's "Scottish accent" as "one of the best" and that he performs his other accents as "all very well". According to Marsh, Alazraqui uses various accents in his comedy routines. He had worked for the Disney Channel on Handy Manny, where he provided the voice for Felipe, the bilingual Phillips-head screwdriver and for Abuelito, Manny's grandfather. He was the original "voice guy" on the Stephanie Miller Show, later being replaced by Jim Ward, who had previously substituted for him. In January 2008, Alazraqui returned to fill in briefly while Ward recovered from surgery. In 2014, he voiced Mesmo and Torts in Mixels. He voices Tio Tortuga in Sheriff Callie's Wild West. From mid June 2016 to early 2020, he voiced Skylar in Elena of Avalor.

In 2023, Alazraqui joined the cast of The Case of the Greater Gatsby, a noir parody podcast produced by Shipwrecked Comedy, playing a singing cowboy actor in 1940s Hollywood. The show also features his Fairly Odder co-stars Lesli Margherita and Mary Kate Wiles (Wiles is also a producer). The show premiered on July 26, 2023.

=== Web ===
In 2009, he collaborated with Ted Nicolaou on the web series The Club, which was released in November 2010. The series features Jill-Michele Meleán, Debra Wilson, Johnny A. Sanchez, Lori Alan, and Daran Norris.

In 2013, Alazraqui starred as a drug dealer in one episode of the Melinda Hill web series Romantic Encounters.

== Personal life ==
Alazraqui resides in Los Angeles, California, with his wife and two daughters. One daughter, Rylee, is a voice actor as well. Rylee is the voice of Rohk-Tahk in the Paramount+ series Star Trek: Prodigy.

== Awards and nominations ==
- 2012 – Annie Award for Best Voice Acting in a Television Production – The Fairly OddParents - Nominated
- 2015 – Annie Award for Best Voice Acting in a Television Production – The Fairly OddParents - Nominated
- 2016 – Emmy Award for Outstanding Performer in an Animated Program – The Fairly OddParents - Nominated
- 2017 – Annie Award for Best Voice Acting in a Television Production – The Mr. Peabody & Sherman Show: Ponce de León - Won
- 2022 – Emmy Award for Outstanding Television Movie - Reno 911!: The Hunt for QAnon - Nominated

Preceded by none	Voice of Spyro the Dragon; 1998	Succeeded by Tom Kenny
