= Bob Boyle (animator) =

American animator and director

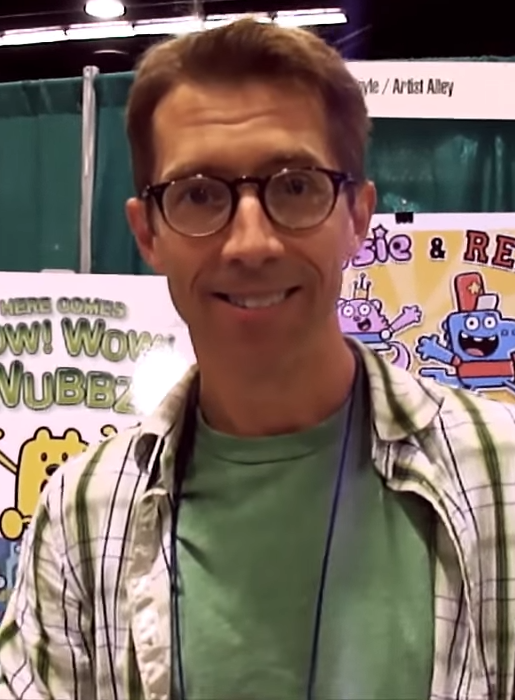
- Boyle in 2012
- Born: Robert Boyle II
- Occupations: Animator; director; producer; writer; storyboard artist; author; illustrator
- Years active: 1990–present
- Known for: The Fairly OddParents; Danny Phantom; Wow! Wow! Wubbzy! Yin Yang Yo! The Powerpuff Girls

Robert Boyle II is an American animator, director, producer, writer, storyboard artist, author and illustrator.

== Career ==
He is the creator and executive producer of shows Wow! Wow! Wubbzy! (Nickelodeon) and Yin Yang Yo! (Jetix/Toon Disney, now Disney XD), and a frequent contributor on Sesame Street. He also worked on the Nickelodeon shows Oh Yeah! Cartoons, The Fairly OddParents, and Danny Phantom. He has written and illustrated two children's books: Hugo and the Really, Really, Really Long String and Rosie & Rex.

He also served as co-creator of a 2007 pilot entitled "Grumpy Puppy". It was not picked up for a series.

Boyle won an Emmy Award in 2008 for his Production Design for Wow! Wow! Wubbzy! He worked as a supervising producer on the Cartoon Network show Clarence during its first season and co-executive producer on The Powerpuff Girls (2016).

== Television ==
Year	Title	Notes
1990–98	Bobby's World	Model, storyboard artist, background artist
1991–92	Mother Goose and Grimm	Storyboard artist
1991–94	Garfield and Friends	Model, storyboard artist, key layout artist
1993–94	Cro	Storyboard artist
1995–96	The Twisted Tales of Felix the Cat	Prop designer
1998–01	Oh Yeah! Cartoons	Creator of "Olly and Frank", prop designer of "Zoomates", storyboard artist, writer
2000	Sammy	Director
2001	Stanley	Storyboard artist ("Watch Out for Lionels")
2001–05	The Fairly OddParents	Executive producer, producer, storyboard artist, art director, layout designer, writer
2002	ChalkZone	Storyboard artist, additional background designer
2004–05	Danny Phantom	Producer, art director
2006–10	Wow! Wow! Wubbzy!	Creator, executive producer, producer, writer, storyboard artist, art director
2006–09	Yin Yang Yo!	Creator, executive producer, producer
2007	Grumpy Puppy	Co-creator (pilot)
2012	Bravest Warriors	Storyboard artist (ep. "The Bunless" & "Mexican Touchdown")
2014–15	Clarence	Supervising producer
2016–19	The Powerpuff Girls (2016)	Developer, director, co-executive producer
2020	Chico Bon Bon: Monkey with a Tool Belt	Developer, executive producer, writer, storyboard artist, art director
2024–26	Rock Paper Scissors	Executive producer
