= John W. Hyde =

American film producer (born 1941)

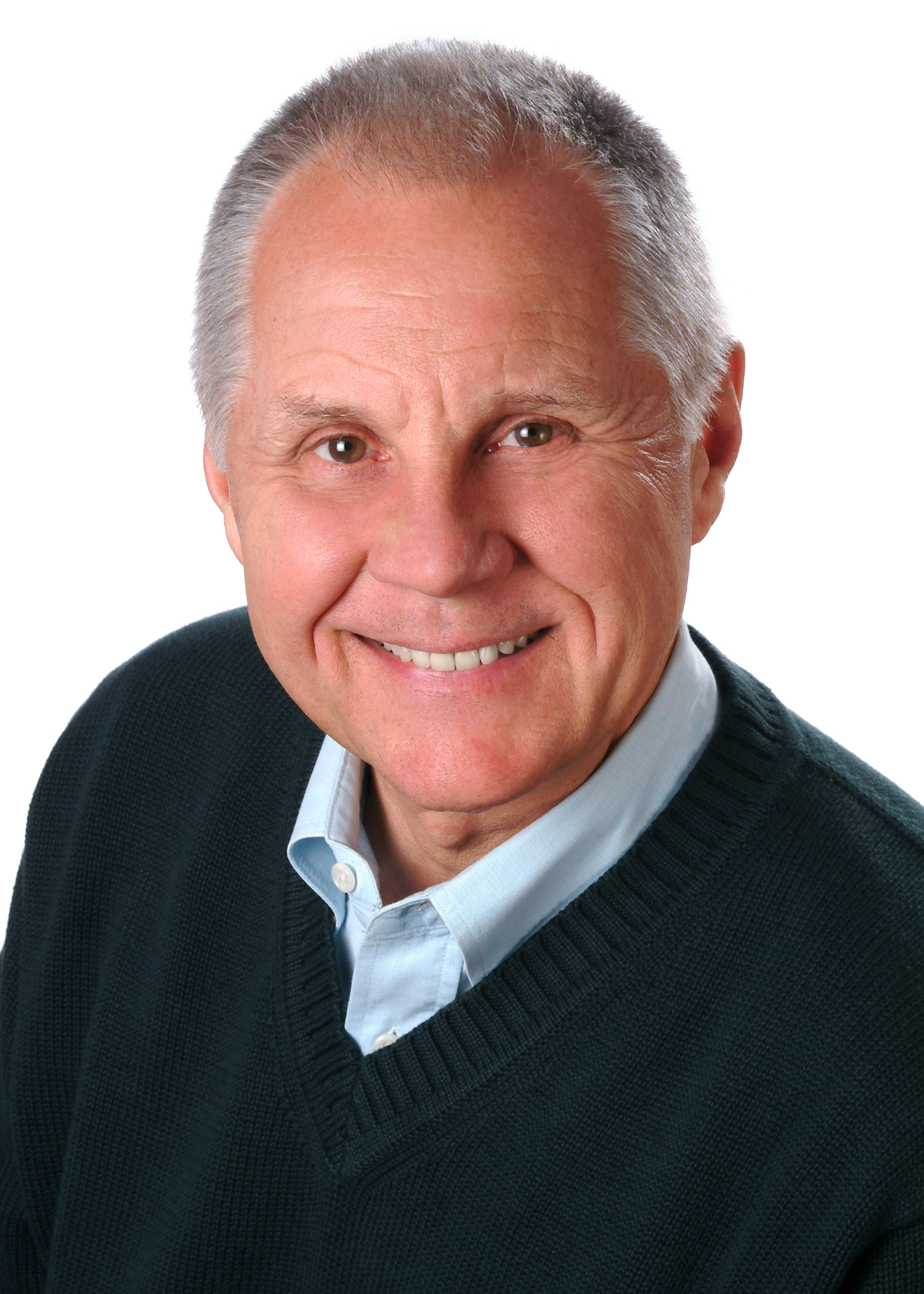
John Hyde

John W. Hyde (born March 29, 1941, in Jackson, Michigan) is an American veteran producer whose credits span feature film, television, and animation. Hyde is married to Kate Morris Hyde and lives in both Los Angeles and Badger, California.

== Biography ==
Hyde is a member of both the Academy of Motion Picture Arts and Sciences and the Academy of Television Arts and Sciences, where he has been nominated for five Emmy Awards, winning one. He is a former officer and director of The Cousteau Society. He was also a founding member, as well as Vice Chairman and Board member, of the American Film Market. Hyde and his wife own Fairlea Ranch and raise World Champion American Quarter Horses. Hyde graduated from New York University with additional international economic studies at Leiden University in the Netherlands.

=== Prior to 1990 ===
Hyde was involved in production, distribution and as a management consultant overseeing the domestic and foreign distribution of nearly 125 motion pictures and television shows. His production credits include Short Circuit, Flight of the Navigator, 8 Million Ways to Die, The NeverEnding Story, Mighty Mouse, Homicide: Life on the Street, 9½ Weeks, UHF, and the award-winning Das Boot.

=== 1990–1995 ===
As CEO of MCEG Sterling, a publicly held motion picture production, distribution, library and consulting company, Hyde reorganized MCEG in 1990 after reaching a major compromise with GE Capital. He then consolidated a series of independent film libraries into MCEG and subsequently engineered a four way merger of MCEG Sterling with Orion Pictures, Activa Corporation, and Metromedia International to form Metromedia

=== 1996–2000 ===
Hyde was CEO of Crossroads V Communications, a leading entertainment industry consulting and management firm. During this period, as CEO of Starbound Records, a music library of over 17,000 digital masters, he reorganized the company and subsequently sold the library. Also during this time Hyde was court appointed CEO/Trustee for Riklis TV Broadcasting (KADY/KADE Television) which he sold on behalf of the creditors in 1999.

=== 2000–2003 ===
Hyde was brought into Film Roman as President and CEO to reorganize the company. Hyde successfully stopped the negative cash flow, cut back the corporate overhead, and generated new business, Tripping the Rift, Eloise, Wow! Wow! Wubbzy!, and Motocross, while continuing to produce The Simpsons and King of the Hill and deliver them to the Fox Network on a timely basis. IDT Entertainment bought control of Film Roman in 2003.

=== 2003–2006 ===
Hyde was Chief Operating Officer of IDT Entertainment and CEO of IDTE Productions, New Arc Productions, Anchor Bay Home Entertainment, and Film Roman. Through a series of acquisitions, and startup subsidiaries, IDT Entertainment grew from $27,000 in revenues in 2003 to annualized revenues of nearly $250,000,000 in 2006. Hyde was responsible for organizing these acquisitions and subsidiaries and creating an infrastructure to give IDT Entertainment a cohesive production and distribution system for motion pictures, cable, DVD, and television. Hyde oversaw all operations of IDT Entertainment day-to-day and led team handling the due diligence, sale, and integration into Starz/Liberty Media.

=== 2007–2010 ===
Hyde served as Vice Chairman of Starz Media who purchased IDT Entertainment in 2006 for nearly $500,000,000. Hyde was responsible for integrating the newly acquired IDT companies into the Starz group of companies. Hyde also served as Vice Chairman of Image Entertainment the leading U. S. independent distributor of DVD, digital and broadcast rights with a catalog of nearly 4000 titles. Hyde was a founding Director of T&M Entertainment which successfully raised $82,000,000 publicly to acquire an entertainment company.

During his years as an industry management consultant, Hyde oversaw the restructuring or reorganization of Avenue Entertainment, Filmstar, Management Company Entertainment Group, Cannon Films, Hemdale Entertainment, Reeves Entertainment, Peregrine Entertainment, Orion, AME Video, MGM, Fries Entertainment, and Riklis TV Broadcasting.

=== 2011–present ===
Most recently, Hyde executive-produced The Happytime Murders, starring Melissa McCarthy, with Henson Alternative and STX Entertainment. He also executive produced Walk Among The Tombstones, based on the motion picture 8 Million Ways to Die and the Lawrence Block book series. Currently, Hyde is vice chairman of The Jim Henson Company. He is also the owner of Rehab Incorporated, which consists of Rehab Entertainment, a television and film, and intellectual rights company, as well as Rehab Consulting, an entertainment and media consulting company. Hyde and producing partner, Terissa Kelton, are currently in development on multiple projects. In feature film, the pair are executive producing Prophet, based on the Prophet (comics) created by Rob Liefeld. They are also executive producing a reimagining of Flight of the Navigator. With the Jim Henson Company, Hyde and Kelton are developing two series: Harriet the Spy, based on the best-selling children's novel by Louise Fitzhugh, and The Kissing Hand, the award-winning children's book by Audrey Penn.

In 2020, after a multi-year partnership, Hyde and Kelton focused their overall vision of the company by co-founding Rehab Entertainment.

In August 2020, Apple TV+ announced the animated remake of Harriet the Spy starring Beanie Feldstein and Jane Lynch with Hyde and Kelton attached as Executive Producers.

== Filmography ==
=== Theatrical feature films ===
- Games (1967), associate producer, Universal (feature film)
- Companions in Nightmare (1968), associate producer, Universal (feature film)
- Skullduggery, associate producer, Universal (feature film)
- The Ravagers (1979), producer, Columbia (feature film)
- The Wanderers (1979), production executive, Warner Bros. (feature film)
- A Change of Seasons (1980), executive in charge of production, 20th Century Fox (feature film)
- The Final Countdown (1980), executive in charge of production, United Artists (feature film)
- Venom (1981), executive in charge of production, Paramount (feature film)
- Dead & Buried (1981), executive in charge of production, Embassy (feature film)
- Das Boot, executive producer, Bavaria Studios/ Columbia (feature film)
- Fire & Ice (1983), executive producer, 20th Century Fox (animated feature)
- The NeverEnding Story (1984), executive producer, Warner Bros. (feature film)
- Clan of the Cave Bear (1986), executive producer, Warner Bros. (feature film)
- 9½ Weeks (1986), executive in charge of production, MGM (feature film)
- Flight of the Navigator (1986), executive producer, Disney (feature film)
- Short Circuit (1986), executive producer, Tri-Star (feature film)
- The Lost Boys (1987), co-executive producer, Warner Bros. (feature film)
- UHF (1989), producer, Orion Pictures (feature film)
- Everyone's Hero 2005, executive producer, FOX (animated feature)
- Space Chimps (2008), executive producer, FOX (animated feature)
- The Haunted World of El Superbeasto (2009), executive producer, Weinstein Company (animated feature)
- A Walk Among The Tombstones (2014), executive producer, Universal (feature film)
- The Happytime Murders (2018), executive producer, STX (feature film)

=== Television series ===
- Lloyd Thaxton Show (1961-1968), production executive, MCA-TV (TV series)
- Andy Williams, Kraft Music Hall (1958-1971), production executive, MCA-TV (TV series)
- Masters Of Horror (2005–2007), executive producer, Showtime (live action series)
- Painkiller Jane (2007), executive producer, Sci-Fi Channel (live action series)
- Masters of Science Fiction (2007), executive producer, ABC (live action series)
- Pride: The Series (2013), executive producer, Amazon Prime Video (digital series)

=== Animated TV series ===
- The Amazing Jorge, executive producer, Film Roman (3D animated short)
- Mighty Mouse: The New Adventures (1987–1988), executive producer, CBS Television (animated TV series)
- The Oblongs (2001), executive producer, Warner Bros. (animated TV series)
- Free for All (2003), executive producer, Showtime (animated cable series)
- King of the Hill (2000–2007), executive producer (Animation), Fox (animated TV series)
- The Simpsons (2000–2007), executive producer (Animation), Fox (animated TV series)
- X-Men (2000-2003), executive producer, Warner Bros. (animated TV series)
- Tripping the Rift (2004–2005), executive producer, Sci-Fi Channel (animated TV series)
- Wow! Wow! Wubbzy! (2006–2008), executive producer, Nickelodeon (animated TV series)
- Eloise: The Animated Series (2006-2007), executive producer, Anchor Bay (DVD Premier animated specials)
- Slacker Cats (2007), executive producer, ABC Family (animated TV series)

=== TV movies ===
- Motocrossed (2001), executive producer, Disney Channel (TV movie)
- All Souls Day: Dia de los muertos (2005), executive producer, Sci-Fi Channel (TV movie)
- Room 6 (2005), executive producer, Sci-Fi Channel (TV movie)
- Demon Hunter (2005), executive producer, Sci-Fi Channel (DTV movie)
- It Waits (2005), executive producer, Sci-Fi Channel (TV movie)
- Dead and Deader (2005), executive producer, Sci-Fi Channel (TV movie)
- The Fallen Ones (2005), executive producer, Sci-Fi Channel (TV movie)
- The Happy Elf (2005), executive producer, NBC (Animated TV special)
- Voodoo Moon (2006), executive producer, Sci-Fi Channel (TV movie)
- Slayer (2006), executive producer, Sci-Fi Channel (TV movie)
- Death Row (2006), executive producer, Sci-Fi Channel (TV movie)

=== DVD premier films ===
- The Toothfairy (2006), executive producer, Anchor Bay (DVD Premier Film)
- The Thirst (2006), executive producer, Anchor Bay (DVD Premier Film)
- The Darkroom (2006), executive producer, Anchor Bay (DVD Premier Film)
- The Garden, executive producer, Anchor Bay (DVD Premier Film)
- Left in Darkness (2006), executive producer, Anchor Bay (DVD Premier Film)
- Devil's Den (2006), executive producer, Anchor Bay (DVD Premier Film)
- Hellboy: Sword of Storms (2006), executive producer, Anchor Bay (DVD Premier animated film)
- Mosaic (2007), executive producer, Anchor Bay (DVD Premier animated film)
- The Condor (2007), executive producer, Anchor Bay (DVD Premier animated film)
- Hellboy: Blood and Iron (2007), executive producer, Anchor Bay (DVD Premier animated film)
- Rebirth of a Nation (2007), executive producer, Starz Media (DVD Premier Documentary)

=== Music videos ===
- Neil Diamond: Brooklyn Roads (1968), producer-director, MCA (music video)
- Marcia Strassman: The Flower Children (1992), producer, MCA (music video)
- Get In Line (1999), executive producer, Bare Naked Ladies (animated music video)
- Frijolero (2003), executive producer, Molotov (animated music video)(Grammy winner)
