= Harriet the Spy (film) =

1996 film by Bronwen Hughes

- Theatrical release poster
- Directed by: Bronwen Hughes
- Screenplay by: Doug Petrie; Theresa Rebeck
- Adaptation by: Greg Taylor; Julie Talen
- Based on: Harriet the Spy by Louise Fitzhugh
- Produced by: Marykay Powell; Nava Levin
- Starring: Michelle Trachtenberg; Rosie O'Donnell
- Cinematography: Francis Kenny
- Edited by: Debra Chiate
- Music by: Jamshied Sharifi
- Production companies: Nickelodeon Movies; Rastar
- Distributed by: Paramount Pictures
- Release date: July 10, 1996
- Running time: 101 minutes
- Country: United States
- Language: English
- Budget: $12 million
- Box office: $26.6 million

Harriet the Spy is a 1996 American coming-of-age comedy film directed by Bronwen Hughes in her feature film directorial debut, and starring Michelle Trachtenberg in her major film acting debut. It co-stars Rosie O'Donnell, J. Smith-Cameron, Gregory Smith, and Vanessa Lee Chester. Based on the 1964 novel of the same name by Louise Fitzhugh, the film follows a sixth-grade student who aspires to become a writer and spy.

Filming began in the fall of 1994 in Toronto and was completed by the end of 1995. Produced by Nickelodeon Movies and Rastar, it was the first film produced under the Nickelodeon Movies banner and the first of two film adaptations of the Harriet the Spy books. In theaters, the pilot episode of Hey Arnold! called Arnold was shown before the film.

The film was released in theaters by Paramount Pictures on July 10, 1996, to mixed reviews from critics. It made $26.6 million worldwide on a production budget of $12 million. The film was released on home video on February 25, 1997.

== Plot ==
Eleven-year-old aspiring spy and writer Harriet M. Welsch lives a privileged life in New York City with her parents, Violetta and Ben, and her nanny, Catherine "Ole Golly," in whom she confides. Harriet and her best friends, Simon "Sport" Rocque and Janie Gibbs, are enemies with a snobby classmate, editor of the sixth-grade newspaper, bully, and class president Marion Hawthorne.

One night, as Harriet's parents are out, Golly invites her friend George to dinner, which she burns; the three go out for dinner and a movie instead. Upon arriving back home, Harriet and Golly realize that Violetta and Ben have returned early. Violetta is enraged at Golly for taking Harriet out without her knowledge and impulsively fires her. Golly concedes that it is time Harriet was "on her own." Before leaving, Golly encourages Harriet not to give up on her love of "spying" and observing people, promising to be the first to buy a signed copy of Harriet's first novel. Depressed and withdrawn, Harriet breaks into the mansion of Agatha Plummer and is caught hiding in her dumbwaiter.

After school, Marion discovers Harriet's private spy notebook. She begins reading aloud Harriet's comments about her friends and peers, such as how she suspects Janie will grow up to be "a total nutcase" and criticizing Sport's father's low earnings. Sport and Janie shun Harriet, and her classmates create a "spy-catcher" club to torment her.

When Harriet begins neglecting her schoolwork, her parents confiscate her notebooks and ask her teacher, Miss Elson, to search her for new notebooks daily. During art class, Marion and her friends pour blue paint over Harriet as revenge for writing things about them in her notebook. Harriet responds, slapping Marion in the face, and flees from the school. She exacts revenge in several ways: by exposing that Marion's father left their family for his secretary, by cutting off a chunk of Laura's hair, by sabotaging Janie's science experiment, and by humiliating Sport with a picture of him in a maid's outfit. This causes her classmates to alienate her further.

Harriet's parents send her for a psychological evaluation; the doctor assures them that Harriet is fine. Harriet gets her notebook back, and, in a surprise visit, Golly tells her that to make things right again, she must do two things that she will not like: apologize and lie. Harriet says it is not worth it, to which Golly disagrees, saying Harriet is worth it as an individual, and her individuality will make others nervous. She adds: "Good friends are one of life's blessings. Don't give them up without a fight."

Harriet tries apologizing to Sport and Janie, who initially rejected her before accepting her apology after finally coming to their senses and consequently quitting Marion's bully group due to being mistreated by her, much to Marion's dismay. Harriet opines to Miss Elson that Marion's appointment as editor was done unfairly, and Miss Elson opens it up for a vote. Harriet is voted in to replace Marion as editor. She writes an article apologizing to the class, all of whom (except Marion) accept her apology. At the opening of the 6th-grade pageant, Janie, Sport, and Harriet set off a stink bomb as all the students, teachers, and audience dance to James Brown's "Get Up Offa That Thing."

== Cast ==
- Michelle Trachtenberg as Harriet M. Welsch
- Rosie O'Donnell as Catherine "Ole Golly"
- Vanessa Lee Chester as Janie Gibbs
- Gregory Smith as Simon "Sport" Rocque
- Eartha Kitt as Agatha K. Plummer
- J. Smith-Cameron as Violetta Welsch
- Robert Joy as Ben Welsch
- Eugene Lipinski as George Waldenstein
- Don Francks as Harrison Withers
- Charlotte Sullivan as Marion Hawthorne
- Teisha Kim as Rachel Hennessy
- Cecilley Carroll as Beth Ellen Hansen
- Dov Tiefenbach as Boy with Purple Socks
- Nina Shock as Carrie Andrews
- Connor Devitt as Pinky Whitehead
- Alisha Morrison as Laura Peters
- Nancy Beatty as Miss Elson
- James Gilfillan as Archie Simmons
- Gerry Quigley as Mr. Rocque
- Jackie Richardson as Mrs. Gibbs
- Roger Clown as Dr. Wagner
- Sally Cahill as Maid

== Production ==
=== Screenplay ===
The screenplay was adapted from Louise Fitzhugh's 1964 novel of the same name. Director Bronwen Hughes commented on the adaptation: "Certain things about the '60s story, especially the relationship between kids and their parents, had to be adjusted to make sense because you don't have that same kind of formality that you had in the book in the '60s between parents and kids. So those things needed to be made more natural for the 1990s kids audience. But it was very important to me that the things that really affected Harriet in the book would be the things that really affected Harriet in the movie." The result mixed elements from various decades, but Hughes aspired to create a "timeless" film that featured little technology.

=== Filming ===
Harriet the Spy was filmed in Toronto during the fall of 1994 and winter of 1995. Bronwen Hughes, who was making her feature directorial debut, recalled: "It was Paramount's financial decision to make Toronto look like New York, although to tell you the truth, nothing looks like a row of brownstones and stoops like New York, so we just started choosing great locations to create a visual experience."

Michelle Trachtenberg recalled the shoot beginning on October 11, 1994, her ninth birthday. She said she related to the character because of her own curiosity and love of writing. She and co-star Vanessa Lee Chester had known each other prior, having filmed a commercial together in New York City when they were five years old. Charlotte Sullivan recalled of the shoot: "When [Bronwen] would direct us, if we were walking she's like, 'Okay, you'll go bop-bop this way then bop-bop this way', she was always dancing. I don't remember her not dancing on set. And music was always playing. It was very cool and in terms of performance art she was pretty ahead of her time. It was a great way also to direct children. It was a way to keep things alive."

== Release ==
=== Box office ===
The film was released in U.S. theaters on July 10, 1996, and the film grossed $6,601,651 on its opening weekend, averaging about $3,615 per each of the 1,826 screens it was shown on. The film went on to gross a total of $26,570,048 by November 10, 1996, and is considered a modest box office success, earning back more than double its $12 million budget.

=== Home media ===
Harriet the Spy was released on VHS by Paramount Home Video on February 25, 1997. The cassette also contained two Rugrats music videos, and customers were able to receive $5 rebate if they bought the movie in an orange clamshell case plus two eligible Rugrats videos.

The film was later released on DVD on May 27, 2003.

In addition to being available for digital purchase, it was added to free streaming service Pluto TV at the beginning of 2025, where it was available at the time of Trachtenberg's death. It became available on Paramount+ in April 2025.

== Reception ==
=== Critical response ===
On Rotten Tomatoes, 47% of 30 critics gave the film a positive review. The site's consensus: "Harriet the Spy is a rapid-fire mystery movie that doesn't have much to offer beyond the two decent lead performances." Audiences surveyed by CinemaScore gave it a grade B+.

Rita Kempley of The Washington Post was critical of the film, deeming it a "tedious" adaptation of the source novel, adding: "Harriet the Spy isn't really a story, but a dark slice of this ruminative child's inner life. Like the more clearly comic Welcome to the Dollhouse, this film finds more wrong than wonder in these terrible, tenderfoot years." Roger Ebert praised the performance of Trachtenberg, but conceded: "It is not a very technically accomplished movie--the pacing is slow and there are scenes that seem amateurish--but since Harriet doesn't intend to inspire anyone to become a movie critic, perhaps it will work a certain charm for its target audience." Owen Gleiberman of Entertainment Weekly, a self-proclaimed fan of the novel, wrote that the film "has its sticky, Afterschool Special side (the ending is way too pat), but at its best it's like a Welcome to the Dollhouse for preadolescents. What Fitzhugh's book had, and what the movie gets, is the glee and neurotic terror of a kid lurching into adult consciousness, learning just how dangerous that notebook we all carry around in our heads really is."

John Anderson of the Los Angeles Times also commented on the film's darker elements, writing that it is "fun, yes, but [it] isn't afraid to expose the nastiness of youth or the offhanded cruelty of one girl's ego. This is not a happy little movie about the sweetness of childhood." Barbara Shulgasser of The San Francisco Examiner dismissed the film, describing the protagonist as "the kind of kid I'm not looking forward to meeting as a grownup... While the well-loved novel was apparently about the admirable battle a kid must wage in order to become an artist in the face of peer disapproval, the movie seems to be about a mean-spirited tyke who has no scruples. If that kind of person wants to become an artist, it's OK by me, but I don't have to root for her."

=== Accolades ===
Year	Award	Category	Recipients	Result	Ref.
1997	Kids' Choice Awards	Favorite Movie Actress	Rosie O'Donnell	Won	
1997	Young Artist Awards	Best Performance in a Feature Film – Leading Young Actress	Michelle Trachtenberg	Won	
1997	Young Artist Awards	Best Performance in a Feature Film – Supporting Young Actress	Vanessa Lee Chester	Won	
1997	Young Artist Awards	Best Family Feature – Drama	Harriet the Spy	Nominated	
1997	Young Artist Awards	Best Performance in a Feature Film – Supporting Young Actor	Gregory Smith	Nominated	

== Remakes ==
Another adaptation of Harriet the Spy was released as a television movie in 2010 titled Harriet the Spy: Blog Wars, with Jennifer Stone in the title role. In 2021, an animated TV series based on the novel, with Beanie Feldstein as the titular character, was released on Apple TV+. In April 2023, it was announced that Trachtenberg would make a guest appearance in the series as Dr. Wagner, which would be her final television appearance before her death in February 2025.
