= Child Welfare League of America =

U.S. non-profit organization

- Formation: 1921
- Type: NGO
- Purpose: Child welfare
- Headquarters: Washington, D.C.
- President and CEO: Linda S. Spears
- Main organ: Board of directors
- Website: www.cwla.org

The Child Welfare League of America (CWLA) is a 501(c)(3) charitable organization that coordinates efforts for child welfare in the United States, and provides direct support to agencies that serve children and families. The organization's vision is "that every child will grow up in a safe, loving, and stable family," and its primary objective is to "Make Children a National Priority". The CWLA is run by professionals in the children's services field. As a national organization it lobbies for both child protection, and delivery of services to children. It is the oldest child welfare organization in the United States.

== History ==
In 1909. U.S. President Theodore Roosevelt convened a White House Conference on the Care of Dependent Children. For the first time, this brought together child welfare advocates from across the United States. In 1915, Carl Christian Carstens, the executive officer of the Massachusetts Society for the Prevention of Cruelty to Children, presented a report at the National Conference of Charities and Correction (NCCC) meeting in Baltimore, detailing the need for cooperation among child welfare groups, the need for community planning, and the need for standards of child care. This resulted in the creation of the Bureau for the Exchange of Information among Child Helping Agencies (BEI) under the auspices and funding of the Russell Sage Foundation. In 1917, the BEI became an independent non-profit association. Following a series of national conferences, the BEI sought to create a permanent national organization for all aspects of child welfare. With the financial assistance of the Commonwealth Fund the CWLA was organized in 1920 with Carl Carstens as its CEO, and formally began work on January 2, 1921 in New York City.

Loula Friend Dunn served as vice president of the CWLA from 1940 to 1950. During this time, representatives of the CWLA toured Canada and Great Britain to evaluate their children's welfare programs after World War II.

While originally founded as a federation of sixty-five service-providing organizations, Carstens, among the most prominent of national child welfare leaders and an opponent of orphanages, wielded it into a force for the development of regulations, especially with regard to child-placement and adoption.

In 1985, the CWLA moved its headquarters from New York City to Washington, D.C. In 2008, the organization had Rep. Chaka Fattah introduce a bill in the U.S. Congress that would have created the White House Conference on Children and Youth for 2010; however, the bill did not pass.

=== The Indian Adoption Project ===
From 1958 to 1967, the CCWLA ran the Indian Adoption Project together with the Bureau of Indian Affairs of the U.S. Department of Interior. Its mission was to place Native American children, primarily from poor households, with mainstream American families. It was criticized by Margaret Atwood and others as "the kidnapping of indigenous children", although most children were removed from their parents care through legal process, The Child Welfare League of America continued to assist in the adoption of Native American children even after 1967 when the program was ended. In 1978, Congressional Hearings found that “the wholesale separation of Indian children from their families is perhaps the most tragic and destructive aspect of American Indian life today.” This resulted in the Indian Child Welfare Act. In June 2001, Child Welfare League Executive Director Shay Bilchik formally apologized for the Indian Adoption Project saying “No matter how well intentioned and how squarely in the mainstream this was at the time, it was wrong; it was hurtful; and it reflected a kind of bias that surfaces feelings of shame.”

== Selected publications ==
- Child Welfare (journal, 1948–present)
- Kline, Draza; Overstreet, Helen Mary (1972). Foster Care of Children: Nurture and Treatment. Studies of the Child Welfare League of America. New York: Columbia University Press. ISBN 0231036019.
- Meezan, William; Katz, Sanford N; Russo, Eva Manoff (1978). Adoptions Without Agencies: a Study of Independent Adoptions. New York: Child Welfare League of America. ISBN 0878681744.
- Magura, Stephen (1986). Outcome Measures for Child Welfare Services: Theory and Applications. Washington, DC: Child Welfare League of America. ISBN 0878682244.
- Anderson, Gary R (1990). Courage to Care: Responding to the Crisis of Children with AIDS. Washington, DC: Child Welfare League of America. ISBN 0878684018.
- Penn, Audrey (1993). The Kissing Hand. Washington, DC: Child Welfare League of America. ISBN 0878685855.
- Hernandez, Arturo (1998). Peace in the Streets: Breaking the Cycle of Gang Violence. Washington, DC: Child Welfare League of America. ISBN 0878686924.
- Bloom, Martin; Gullotta, Thomas P (2001). Promoting Creativity Across the Life Span. Washington, DC: CWLA Press. ISBN 0878688110.
- Nunno, Michael A; Day, David M; Bullard, Lloyd (2008). For Our Own Safety: Examining the Safety of High-Risk Interventions for Children and Young People. Arlington, VA: Child Welfare League of America. ISBN 9781587600005.

== See also ==
- Timeline of children's rights in the United States
