= Harriet the Spy (TV series) =

American television series

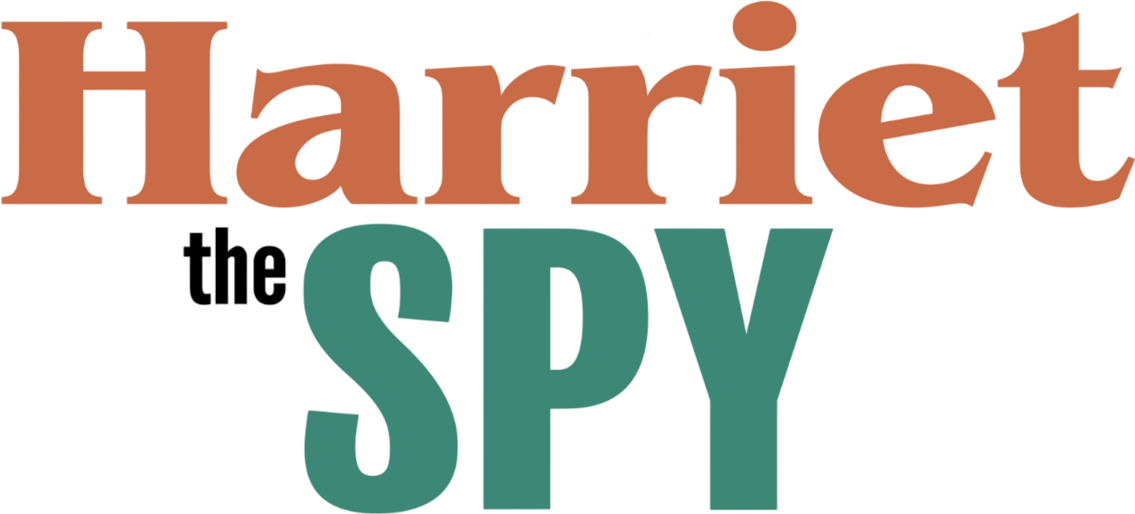
- Based on: Harriet the Spy by Louise Fitzhugh
- Developed by: Will McRobb
- Directed by: Allison Craig
- Voices of: Beanie Feldstein; Jane Lynch
- Theme music composer: Courtney Barnett
- Composer: Anna Waronker
- Country of origin: United States
- Original language: English
- No. of seasons: 2
- No. of episodes: 20

Production
- Executive producers: Lisa Henson; Halle Stanford; Nancy Steingard; Wendy Moss Klein; John W. Hyde; Will McRobb
- Producer: Sidney Clifton
- Editor: Greg Buracker
- Running time: 23–24 minutes
- Production companies: The Jim Henson Company; Wellsville Pictures; Titmouse, Inc.

Original release
- Network: Apple TV+
- Release: November 19, 2021 – May 5, 2023

Harriet the Spy is an American animated television series for Apple TV+, loosely based on the book of the same name by Louise Fitzhugh. The series premiered on November 19, 2021. Season 2 premiered on May 5, 2023.

== Cast and characters ==
- Beanie Feldstein as Harriet M. Welsch
- Jane Lynch as Catherine Myrtle "Willa" Galliano ("Ole Golly")
- Lacey Chabert as Marion Hawthorne
- Kimberly Brooks as Janie Gibbs, Mrs. Gibbs (Janie's mom)
- Crispin Freeman as Mr. Welsch (Harriet's dad)
- Grey Griffin as Mrs. Welsch (Harriet's mom), Beth Ellen Hansen
- Bumper Robinson as Mr. Gibbs (Janie's dad)
- Charlie Schlatter as Simon "Sport" Rocque
- Michelle Trachtenberg as Dr. Wagner

== Production ==
In August 2020, it was announced that Apple TV+ had given a series order to an animated television adaptation of the novel Harriet the Spy. The series is produced by The Jim Henson Company and Rehab Entertainment with Will McRobb as writer, Sidney Clifton as producer and Terissa Kelton and John W. Hyde as executive producer. It would star Beanie Feldstein as Harriet, Jane Lynch as Ole Golly, and Lacey Chabert as Marion Hawthorne. A trailer was released on October 12, 2021. 5 episodes aired on November 19, 2021, and 5 more aired on May 20, 2022. Season 2 was released on May 5, 2023.

In April 2023, it was announced that Michelle Trachtenberg, who had previously played the titular character in the 1996 film, would be guest starring as the voice of Dr. Wagner. This would end up being one of her final acting roles before her death from complications of diabetes in February 2025.

== Episodes ==
=== Series overview ===
Season	Episodes		Originally released
1	10	5	November 19, 2021
1	10	5	May 20, 2022
2	10		May 5, 2023

=== Season 1 (2021–2022) ===
No. overall	No. in season	Title	Directed by	Written by	Original release date
Part 1
1	1	"I Am a Terrible Spy"	Allison Craig	Will McRobb	November 19, 2021
Harriet's ambition to know and see everything may change reclusive Agatha K. Plumber's life for the better.
2	2	"Coat Vote"	Allison Craig	Will McRobb	November 19, 2021
Harriet's new coat is perfect for her – and Marion Hawthorne, apparently. But who will win the school's vote?
3	3	"Cross My Heart and Hope Not to Dance"	Allison Craig	Levi Abrino	November 19, 2021
Janie and Harriet vow never to go to dancing school, but Harriet doesn't know that Janie actually likes dancing.
4	4	"Hermit the Spy"	Allison Craig	Charley Feldman	November 19, 2021
After an awful day, Harriet wants some alone time. Watching Mr. Withers' 26 cats is just what she needs... or is it?
5	5	"The Origin of M"	Allison Craig	Haley Mancini	November 19, 2021
Harriet learns about her middle initial and questions who she is. Her nanny, Ole Golly, teaches Harriet a valuable lesson about identity.
Part 2
6	6	"Face the Music"	Allison Craig	Lorraine DeGraffenreidt	May 20, 2022
Janie and Harriet get to meet their favorite singer, only to discover a shocking truth about his music.
7	7	"The Rarest Bird"	Allison Craig	Levi Abrino	May 20, 2022
Harriet really wants to win a photo competition, but it means teaming up with someone she doesn't see eye to eye with: her mom.
8	8	"The Stuffy Lovers"	Allison Craig	Will McRobb	May 20, 2022
Sport and Harriet think it's time to get rid of their beloved stuffies, but change their minds – and the narrative – thanks to Marion's sneaky reporting.
9	9	"Spy V. Spy"	Allison Craig	Haley Mancini	May 20, 2022
Harriet adds the Garcia family to her spy route... and discovers that someone is spying on her.
10	10	"To My Future Self"	Allison Craig	Levi Abrino	May 20, 2022
On her birthday, Ole Golly revisits a list of everything she wanted to do by the age of thirty-five, and Harriet is determined to help her complete it.

=== Season 2 (2023) ===
No. overall	No. in season	Title	Directed by	Written by	Original release date
11	1	"General Mouthwashington"	Allison Craig	Levi Abrino and Lorraine deGraffenreidt	May 5, 2023
When Harriet loses her last – and favorite – baby tooth, she struggles with saying goodbye to her babyhood.
12	2	"It's My Party and I'll Spy If I Want To"	Allison Craig	Charley Feldman	May 5, 2023
Harriet wants to learn more about the Robinsons, the most boring people on her spy route, but is relegated to the kids' party instead of mingling with the adults.
13	3	"World of Tomorrow"	Allison Craig	Halle Stanford and Charley Feldman	May 5, 2023
At the 1964 World's Fair, Harriet gets separated from her class after she thinks a boy takes a photograph of her.
14	4	"Lucky Penny"	Allison Craig	Haley Mancini	May 5, 2023
When Sport is reluctant to use his lucky penny to help them beat Marion to win a super ball, their friendship is put to the test.
15	5	"Ole Golly in Love"	Allison Craig	Aminta Goyel	May 5, 2023
Harriet spies on Mr Waldenstein, Ole Golly's boyfriend, and tries to reveal that there's a Mrs Waldenstein in his life.
16	6	"The Walrus and the Carpenter"	Allison Craig	Haley Mancini	May 5, 2023
After Marion proposes the fall play to be about the various dishes at Thanksgiving dinner, Harriet indirectly leads an unrising for all the side dishes.
17	7	"The Age of Harriet"	Allison Craig	Will McRobb	May 5, 2023
Marion finds Harriet's spy notebook, and reads it out all the mean comments about their classmates.
18	8	"Everybody Hates Me"	Allison Craig	Haley Mancini	May 5, 2023
Harriet's classmates form the Anti-Spy club, letting everyone know that she's spying on everyone.
19	9	"I Am the Onion"	Allison Craig	Charley Feldman	May 5, 2023
Inspired by a TV show, Harriet is put on trial to defend all her statements in her notebook.
20	10	"Harriet the Writer"	Allison Craig	Haley Mancini	May 5, 2023
Ole Golly mails a letter to Harriet with some advice on how to repair her friendships.

== Reception ==
The series received a mixed reception. Ashley Moulton of Common Sense Media described the series as a "so-so TV adaptation of classic kid sleuth story." She also said that Harriet "was never meant to be a role model" but has some qualities which are admirable and pointed to a "fair amount of consumerism", arguing that the "charm of the book" doesn't quite translate to the series, and that those into "sleuth stories" should read the original instead.
