= Water Mill (Water Mill, New York) =

Water mill in New York, US

- U.S. National Register of Historic Places
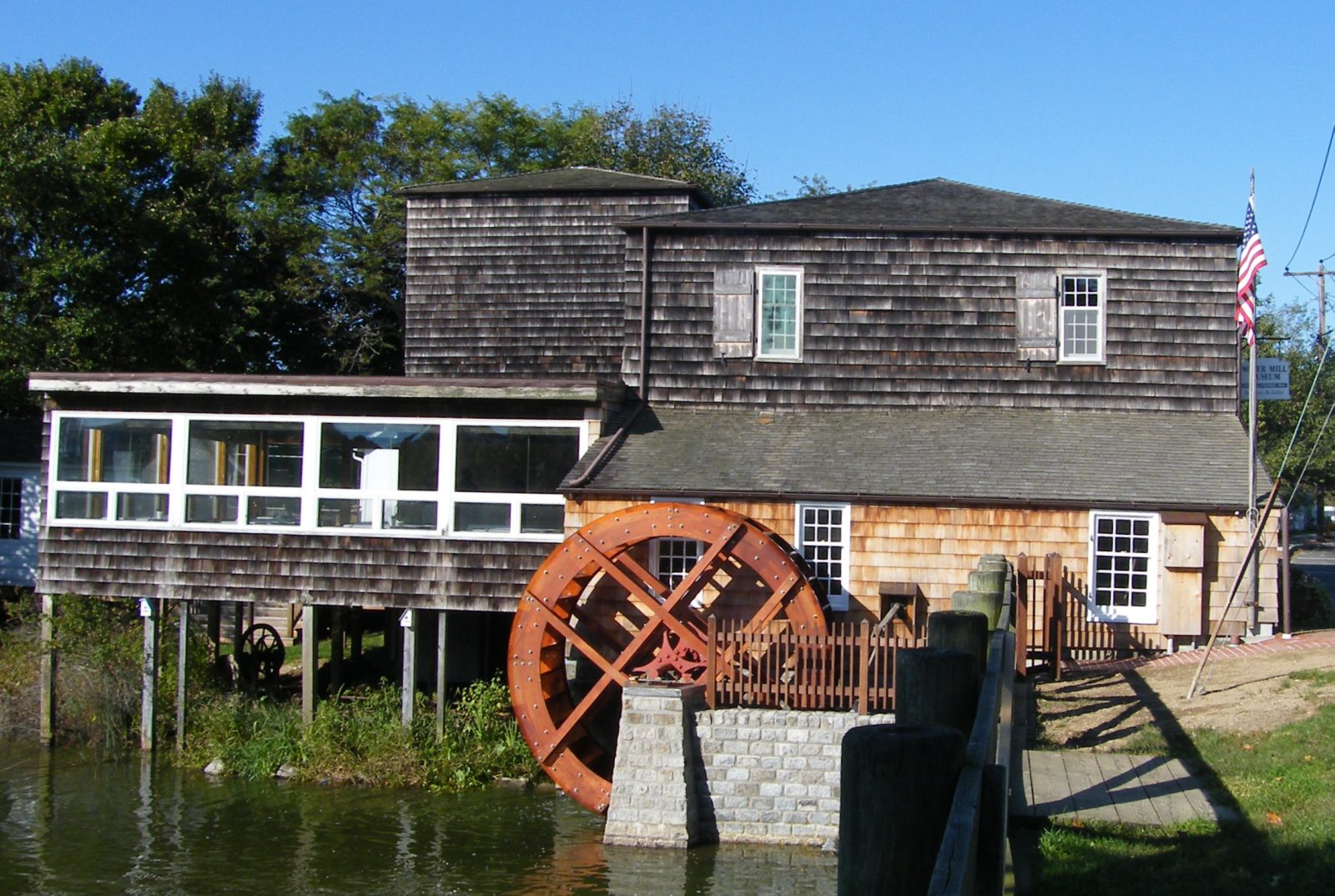
- Water Mill, October 2008

- Location within New York Location within the United States
- Location: Old Mill Rd., Water Mill, New York
- Coordinates: 40°54′33″N 72°21′24″W
- Area: less than one acre
- Built: 1644
- Architect: Howell, Edward
- NRHP reference No.: 83004175
- Added to NRHP: October 13, 1983

The Water Mill Museum is a historic water mill and local history museum located at 41 Old Mill Road, Water Mill in Suffolk County, New York, USA. It is a 2-story, heavy wood-frame structure with a wood-shingle exterior and composed of two building sections. There is a 2-story, square-shaped main section and 1-story, one-bay wing. Attached to the rear is a 2 1/2-story tower and 1-story glassed-in porch. The mill structure dates to the mid-17th century. It operated as a mill until the early 20th century. It is now a local museum.

== The First Mill ==
It was added to the National Register of Historic Places in 1983. The first mill, which was grinding wheat, oats and corn by 1644, was a few hundred yards to the north of its current site on Mill Creek. English colonists from Lynn, Massachusetts had settled in Southampton as the puritans spread over the northeast to Connecticut and New York. Miller Edward Howell had also owned a water mill in Lynn and he selected a 100-acre pond at Mill Creek three miles from Southampton for a mill. Howell was town magistrate and convinced the elders to provide 39 acres on the pond, he also got laborers and funds to aid in building a mill. Millstones were cut from two large boulders taken from the moraine just north of the site. Community mills operated on a barter system, where farmers had the miller grind the grist in exchange for 10% and were usually built on public lands.

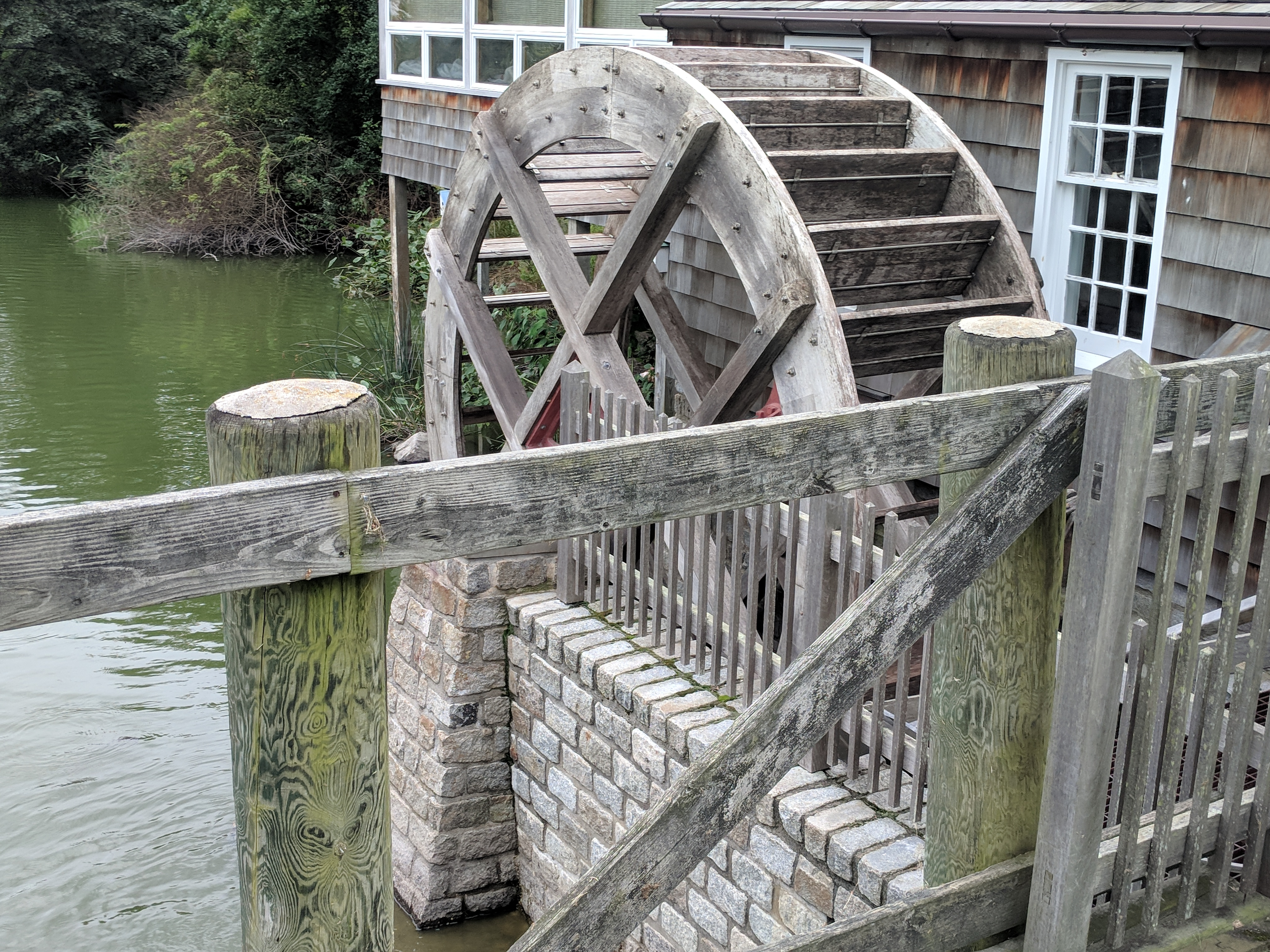
Waterwheel at Watermill

== Water Mill ==
In 1726 it was decided to move the mill south, and it was moved again in 1790. The town granted permission for both moves and work to improve mill operation by a combination of a dam and roadway at its present site on Old Water Mill Road. First mill had an overshot wheel but at the dam site an undershot wheel was used. Archivists also unearthed evidence in the basement of the mill that suggested use at sometime in the past of a horizontal tub water wheel. The mill ownership changed thru the years. William Ludlam Sr. purchased it from Howell whom was a wealthy businessman with other interests in 1653 and it remained in the Ludlam family for over one hundred years. Subsequent owners Elias Petty, William Foster, Hugh Smith explored the industrial uses of the mill. Jesse hedges and John White also used its power to weave, full cloth and manufacture paper. John Benedict arrived in 1819 to work at the mill as a fuller, dyer and dresser of cloth. By 1833 he was the deeded owner. The Benedict family subsequently used the building for dyeing, spinning, weaving and fulling wool cloth. The mill still took grain in for grist. When the LIRR began operating nearby water to the mill was reduced, in 1892 the Benedicts installed a red windpump windmill to aid in grinding. It was later removed. By the early 1900s the mill was no longer a working concern. In 1921 the Ladies Auxiliary of Water Mill began leasing the building and make necessary repairs. Annual leasing ended in 1942 and they became owners of the mill. In 1968 the LAWM began restoring the mill as a museum. In 1976, the landmarked water-powered grist mill was working and able to replicate 18th century grinding methods.

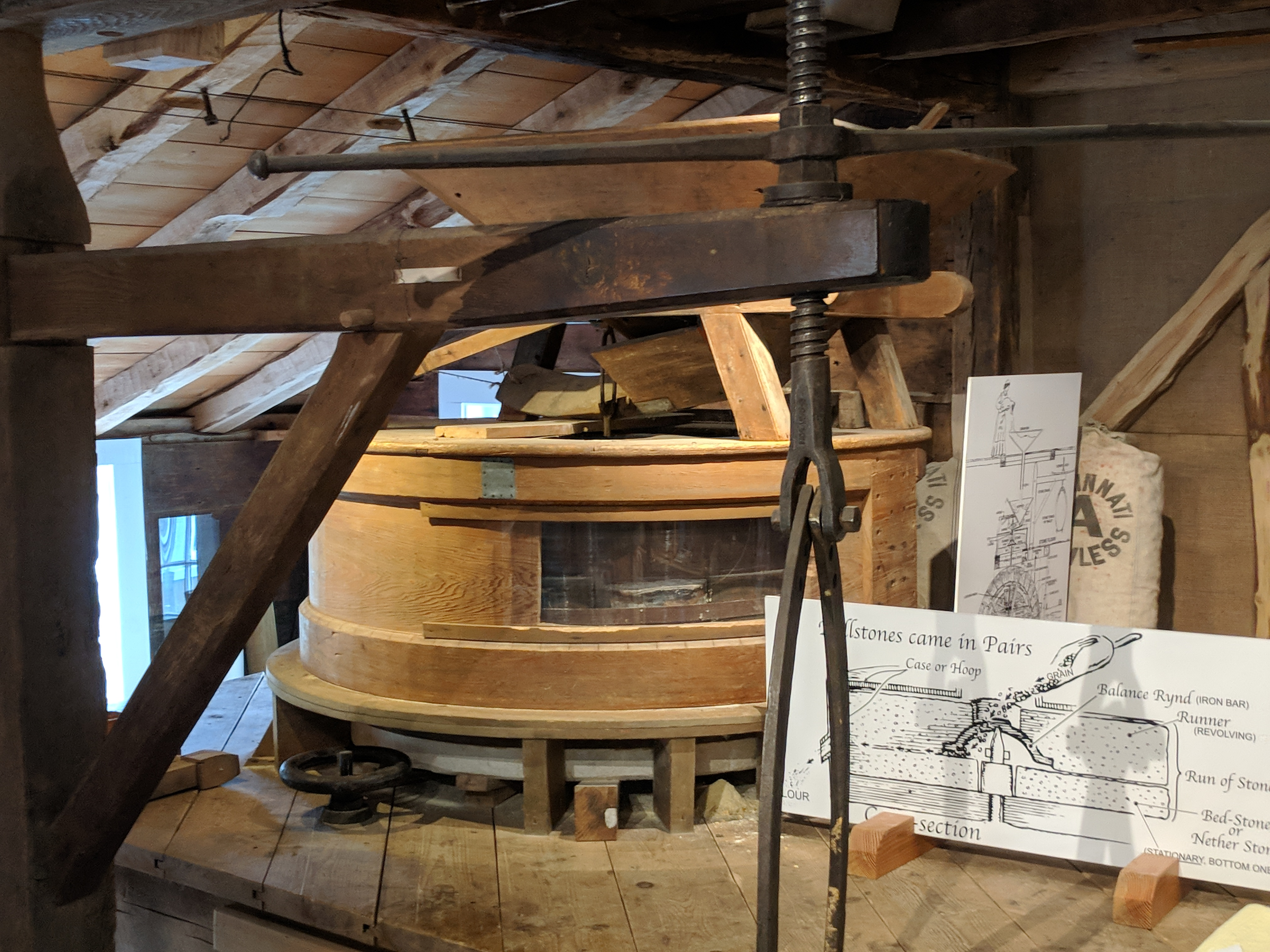
Gristmill 20180913 144150

The water mill museum has an annual quilt show and permanent exhibits on the history of Water Mill. It is currurrently operated by the Water Mill Museum Inc., a non-profit organization.

== Gallery ==
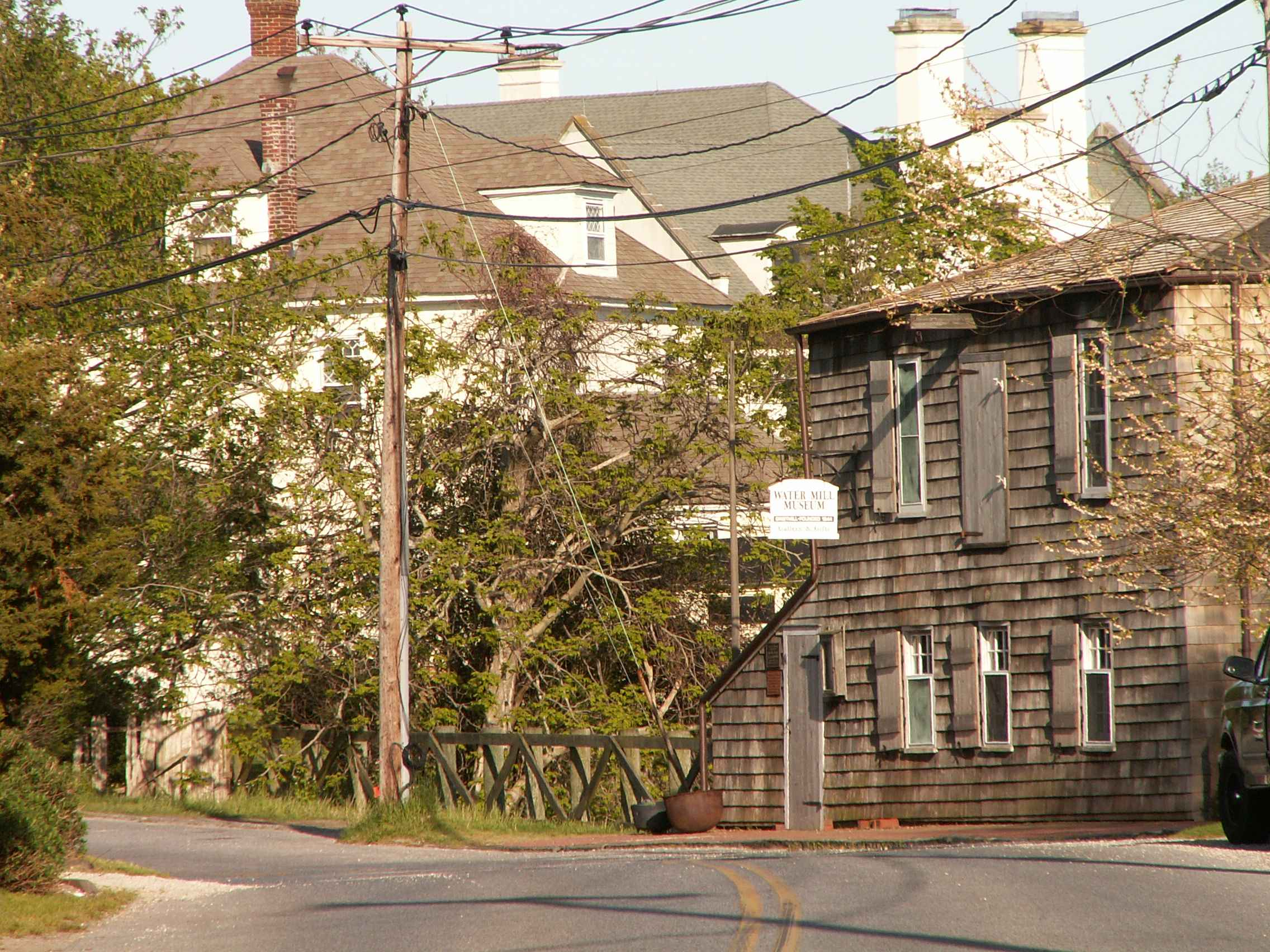
The mill from Old Mill Street, May 2006

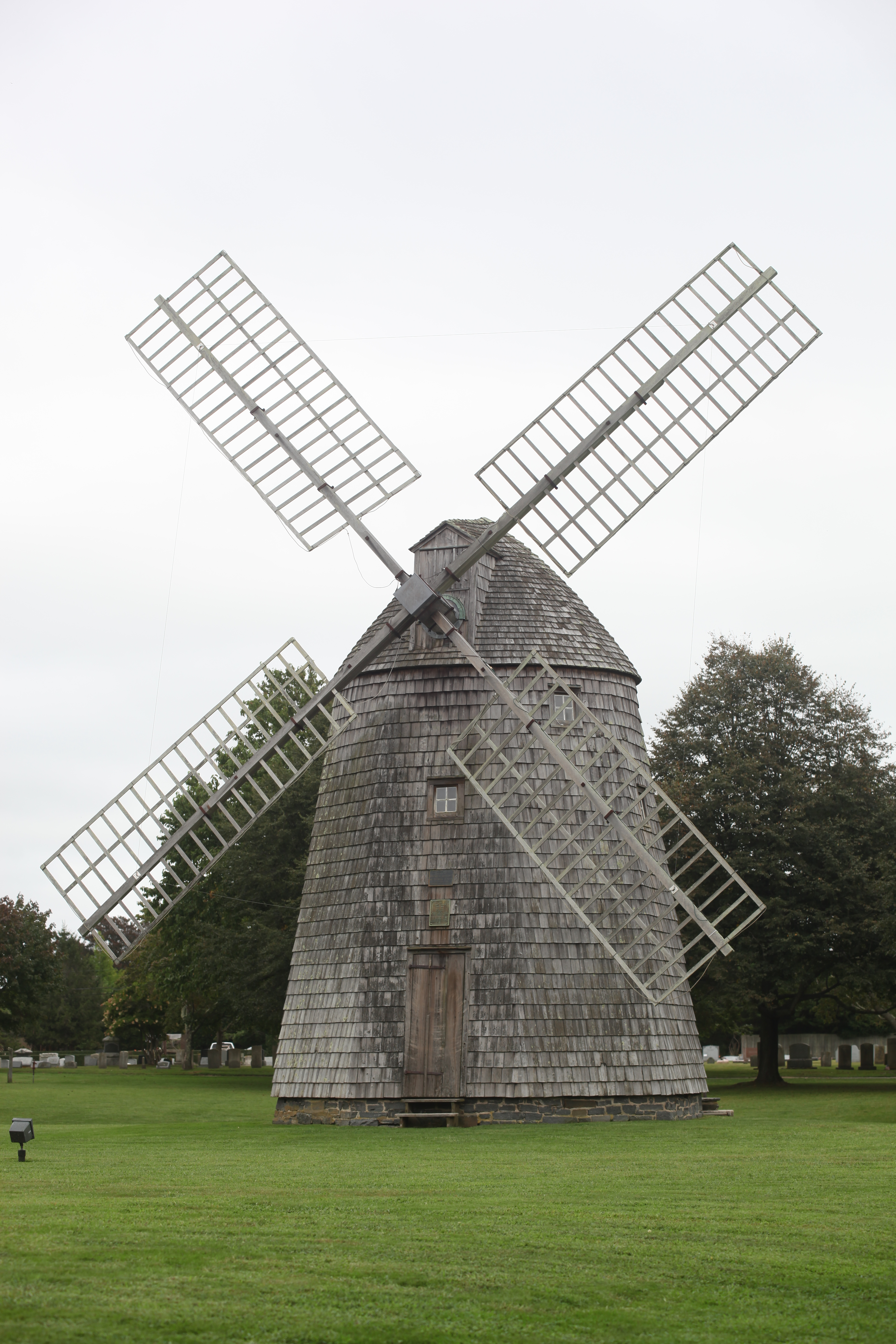
Facing south to entrance door, windmill at watermill

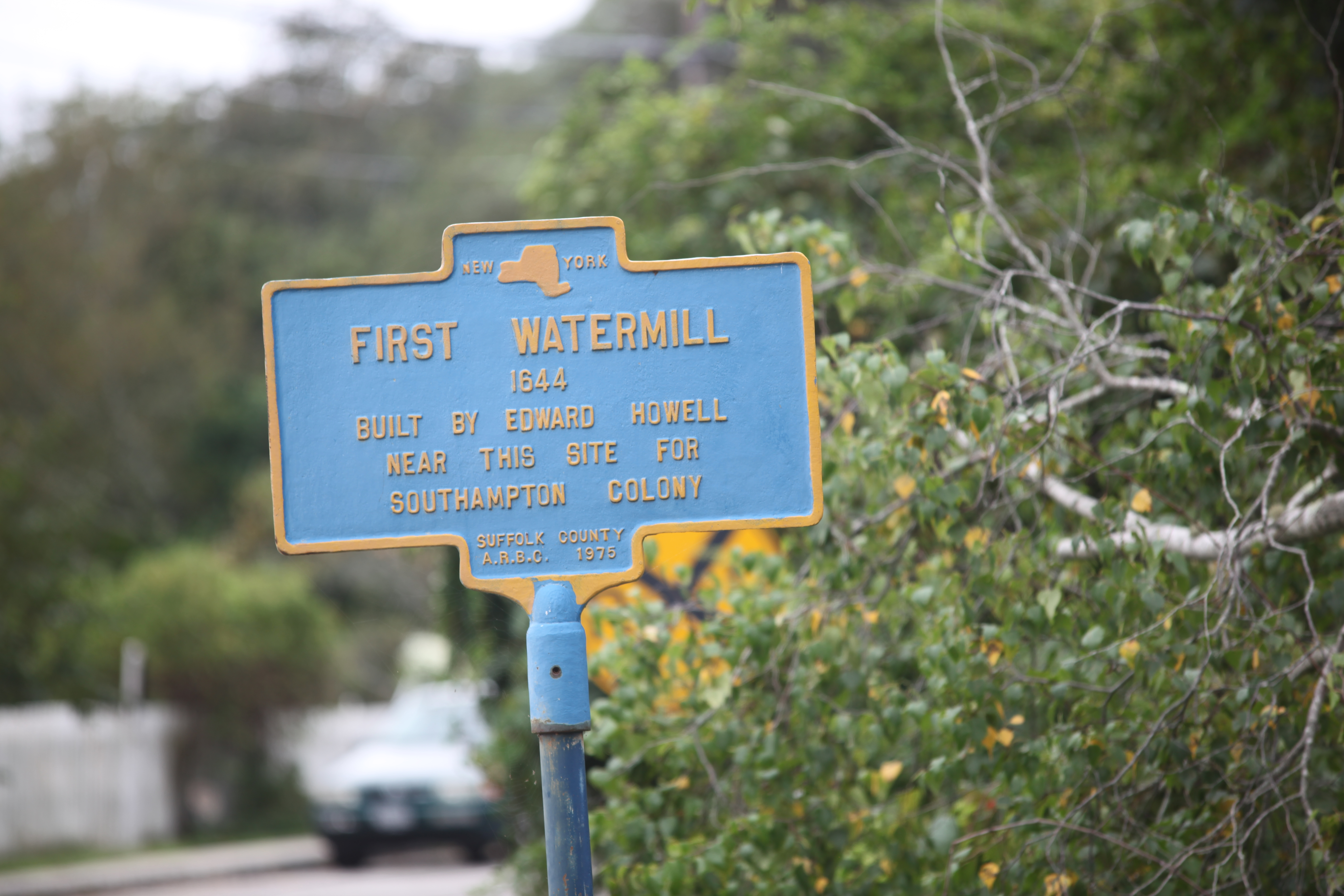
NYS historic site added to the National Register of Historic Places in 1983. Plaque on Water Mill Road.

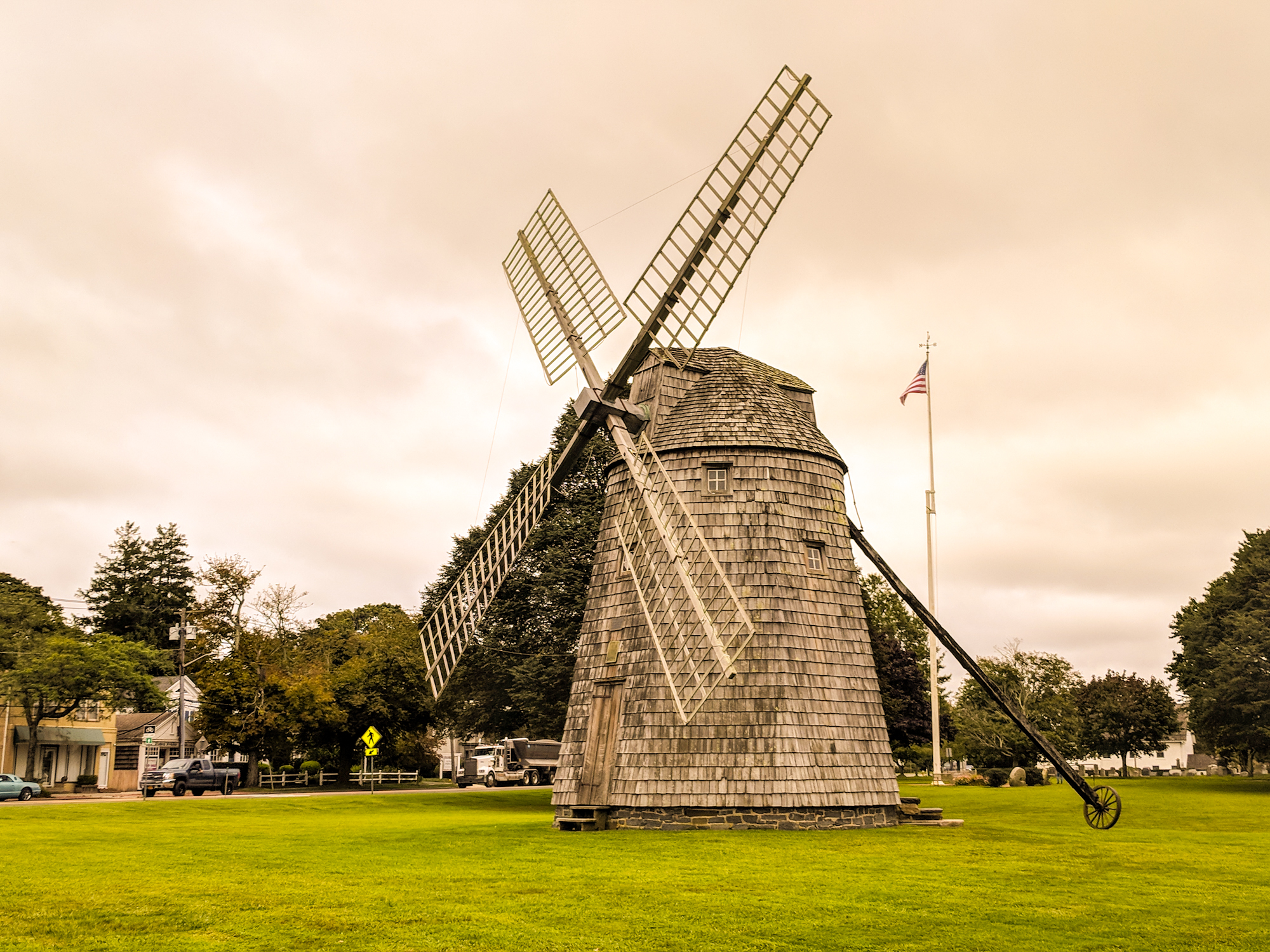
Windmill facing east on Halsey lane

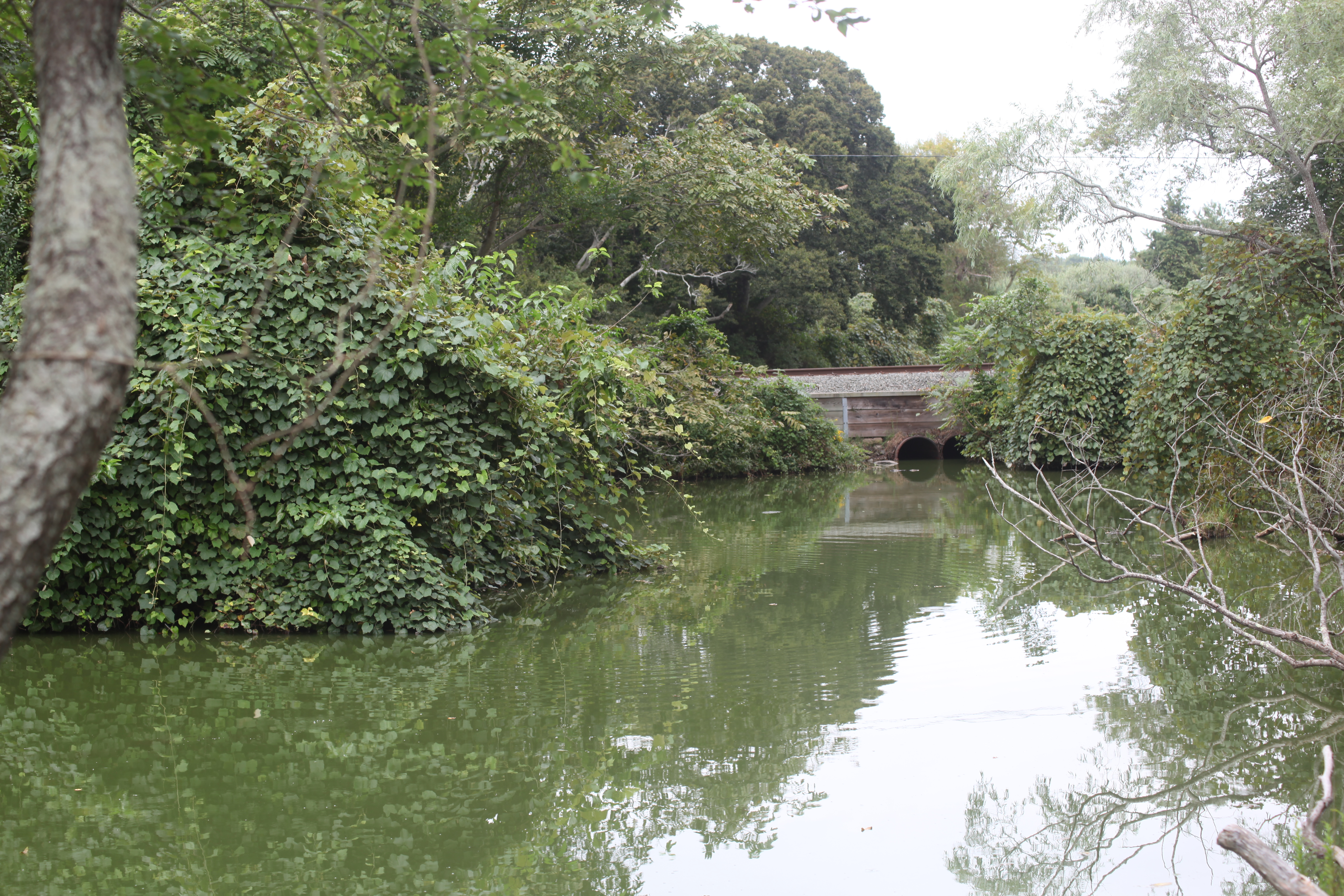
North of the mill where first mill was built.

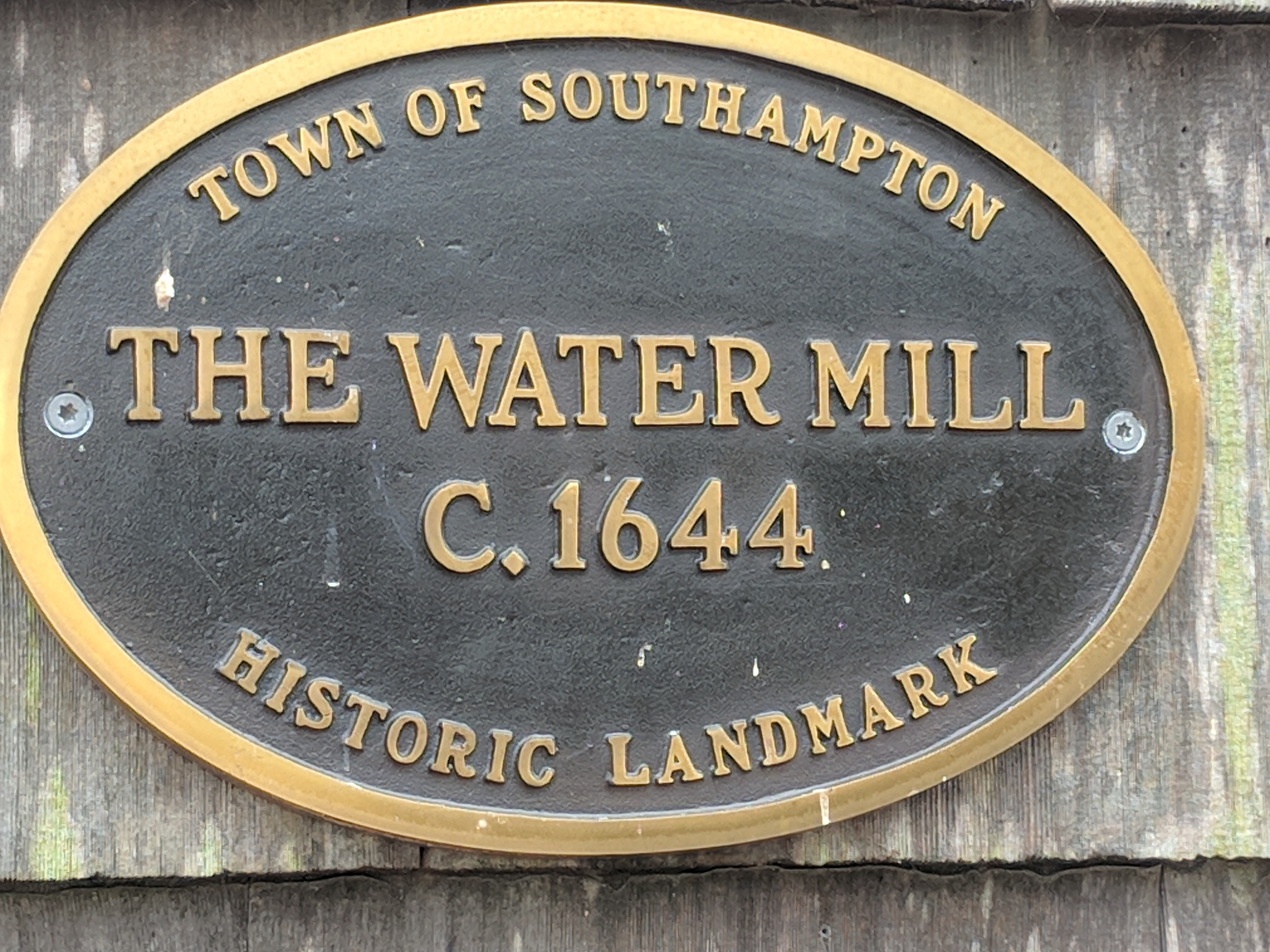
Landmark badge
