= Alisha Morrison =

Canadian actress (born 1986)

- Born: April 23, 1986 (age 40); Toronto, Ontario, Canada
- Education: Cardinal Carter Academy for the Arts
- Occupation: Actress
- Years active: 1993–2011
- Known for: Harriet the Spy; Mean Girls
- Website: Twitter: @alishamorrison

Alisha Morrison (born April 23, 1986) is a Canadian actress known for roles in Harriet the Spy and Mean Girls.

== Biography ==
Morrison was born in Toronto, Ontario, Canada to an African-Caribbean family. She started acting in film at age 7 and has continued to act into adulthood. Morrison has acted in live-stage, TV, and film. She appeared in the 1993 Toronto revival of Show Boat as one of the children.

Morrison attended the Cardinal Carter Academy for the Arts, in Toronto, where she was a drama major. She won the drama award as she graduated. She appeared in many plays at the school, including A Midsummer Night's Dream as lead, Annie as supporting lead, and The Music Man as ensemble.

In 2001, she does voiceover work in Swap TV.

In 2004, Morrison appeared in the Fey-wrote, comedic film Mean Girls. She originally auditioned for the role of Gretchen Wieners (played by Lacey Chabert), but was cast as Lea Edwards, one of the "unfriendly black hotties." Morrison stated she and Lindsay Lohan bonded on set because they were some of the youngest cast members.

In 2008, Morrison was a guest of the Toronto International Film Festival, noting her work in Mean Girls and Soul Food.

Morrison is represented by Premier Artists' Mgmt. Inc. As of early 2021, she works at a gold mining company in Canada.

== Filmography ==
Year	Title	Role	Notes
1995	First Degree	Annie Rodie	
1996	Harriet the Spy	Laura Peters	
1996	L5: First City in Space	Chieko's Friend	
1999	Are You Afraid of the Dark?	Isabel	Episode: "The Tale of the Virtual Pets"
2000	The Courage to Love	Simone	TV movie
2000	Alley Cats Strike	Gina	TV movie
2000	Livin' for Love: The Natalie Cole Story	Cookie Cole (ages 13-16)	TV movie
2000-2001	Soul Food	Young Teri	2 episodes
2000-2001	Corduroy	Lisa	Voice role; credited as Alesha Morrison
2004	Mean Girls	Lea Edwards	
2005	Instant Star		Episode: "I Wanna Be Your Boyfriend"
2009	Da Kink in My Hair	Lisa	Episode: "Honesty the Best Policy?"
2011	The Listener	Bride	Episode: "Jericho"
