= Sandra Scoppettone =

American author (born 1936)

- Born: June 1, 1936 (age 90); Morristown, New Jersey, U.S.
- Writing career
- Pen name: Jack Early
- Language: English
- Genres: Young Adult, Mystery
- Notable works: Suzuki Beane, Happy Endings Are All Alike, Trying Hard to Hear You, Everything You Have Is Mine
- Notable awards: Eugene O'Neill Memorial Theatre Award (1972), Shamus Award of the Private Eye Writers of America.

Sandra Scoppettone (born June 1, 1936, Morristown, New Jersey) is an American author whose career spans the 1960s through the 2000s. She is known for her mystery and young adult books.

She wrote Suzuki Beane (1961) with illustrator Louise Fitzhugh.

She came out as a lesbian in the 1970s. Her play Home Again, Home Again, Jiggerty Jig was produced by TOSOS, a gay and lesbian theatre company, in 1975. Her book Happy Endings Are All Alike (1978) was one of the earliest young-adult books to depict a lesbian relationship; it was chosen by the American Library Association for its "Best Books for Young Adults" list. Three of her novels have been finalists for the Lambda Literary Award for Lesbian Mystery.

== Publications ==
=== Mystery ===
- Some Unknown Person (1977)
- Such Nice People (1980)
- Innocent Bystanders (1983)
- Beautiful Rage (2004)
- This Dame for Hire (2005)
- Too Darn Hot (2006)

==== As Jack Early ====
- A Creative Kind of Killer (1984)
- Razzamatazz (1985)
- Donato & Daughter (1988)

==== Lauren Laurano series ====
- Everything You Have Is Mine (1991)
- I'll Be Leaving You Always (1993)
- My Sweet Untraceable You (1994)
- Let's Face The Music and Die (1996)
- Gonna Take a Homicidal Journey (1998)

=== Young adult literature ===
- Trying Hard to Hear You (1974)
- The Late Great Me (1976)
- Happy Endings Are All Alike (1978)
- Long Time Between Kisses (1982)
- Playing Murder (1985)

=== Children's books ===
- Bang, Bang, You're Dead (co-written with Louise Fitzhugh, illus. Fitzhugh) (Harper & Row, 1969)
