= The Tap Dance Kid =

- 1983 Broadway Playbill
- Music: Henry Krieger
- Lyrics: Robert Lorick
- Book: Charles Blackwell
- Basis: Louise Fitzhugh novel Nobody's Family is Going to Change
- Productions: 1983 Broadway; 2022 New York City Center Encores!

The Tap Dance Kid is a musical based on the novel Nobody's Family is Going to Change by Louise Fitzhugh. It was written by Charles Blackwell with music by Henry Krieger and lyrics by Robert Lorick.

== Synopsis ==
=== Act I ===
William Sheridan, a successful attorney, lives on Roosevelt Island with his wife Ginnie and their two children: 14-year-old Emma, an outspoken, independent-minded, and overweight girl who wants to be a lawyer more than anything, and 10-year-old Willie, whom William wants to follow in his footsteps. However, all Willie wants is to be a tap dancer. The show opens on a typical morning, with Ginnie making breakfast and preparing for the day, and Emma and Willie arguing ("Another Day"). Later that day, Emma returns home from school, angry at her parents and the world for underestimating and mistreating her ("Four Strikes Against Me"). Ginnie's brother Dipsey Bates arrives for Willie's tap lesson. The kids urge him to tell stories about the old days when Ginnie, Dipsey, and their late father Daddy Bates performed as a vaudeville trio ("Class Act"). The number ends as William returns home from work. Finding his study in disarray, he coolly greets Dipsey, for whom he has little use as a 33-year-old dancer. Dipsey exits, leaving William to examine the children's report cards. He pays scant attention to Emma's exceptional grades, but he is so disappointed by Willie's poor grades that he grounds him and forbids him from dancing.

Three weeks later, Willie still has not been allowed to dance. He goes to the playground where he is taunted for dancing by Winslow, a local teenage bully. Emma arrives and defends Willie against Winslow, but she still admonishes him for dancing. Emma and Willie fight and complain about their parents before Emma leaves ("They Never Hear What I Say"). Willie expresses to Emma what dancing means to him ("Dancing Is Everything"). Willie runs away to Manhattan in search of Dipsey ("Crosstown").

Dipsey is rehearsing his dancers for an industrial show for a shoe buyers' convention. The performance has been designed to showcase Dipsey's dancing and choreographic talents, which he hopes will impress the producers of an out-of-town Broadway tryout ("Fabulous Feet"). Willie arrives during the rehearsal and is uncontrollably drawn into the number, dancing with his uncle. The dancers are so amazed by Willie that they stop dancing to watch him perform. Excited by his nephew's potential, Dipsey rushes the boy home to tell his parents the good news. Dipsey's assistant Carole is left to continue the rehearsal. After the rehearsal, she reflects on her emotions for Dipsey ("I Could Get Used to Him").

Dipsey brings Willie back home and excitedly tells Ginnie and William of Willie's raw talent. William interrupts, furious because Willie ran away and risked his life by going alone to New York City. Sensing his authority slipping away due to Ginnie and Emma's protests, William lashes out and forbids Willie from tap dancing and seeing Dipsey. Willie, heartbroken, runs out onto the terrace, and Dipsey follows him and comforts him, telling him he'll have to dance inside of himself ("Man in the Moon").

=== Act II ===
Willie has not danced for weeks and is miserable. During another breakfast in the Sheridan household, an argument ensues, and William storms out. Emma accuses her mother of not asserting herself or caring enough about her children. Ginnie accuses Emma of being exactly like her father. They fight ("Like Him"). Dipsey and Carole, now dating and living together, wait in their loft to find out if Dipsey booked the out-of-town tryout in Buffalo, New York. Dipsey has just given up hope when the phone rings with news that he got the job. Dipsey and Carole celebrate, with Dipsey finally succeeding in life ("My Luck Is Changing").

Willie has gone to the playground to be alone, and Emma comes looking for him. This time, instead of arguing, they connect and dream about a day they are understood by their parents ("Someday").

Ginnie comes to Dipsey's loft, confused and upset, not knowing how to cheer up Willie. Dipsey tries to convince her to let Willie try out for a role in his new Buffalo show. Ginnie, knowing what the consequences might be, refuses. Echoing Emma's earlier sentiments, Dipsey accuses Ginnie of caring only about keeping her husband happy. Ginnie explains to Dipsey that William was not always like this, and that there is still good inside of him ("I Remember How It Was"). She goes to Willie's bedroom and warily tells him about his audition the next day for Dipsey's show. Willie is overjoyed. Ginnie tucks him in for the night and sings to her son until he falls asleep ("Lullabye").

Willie has a wonderful dream starring his grandfather, in which Willie auditions for the show the following day. The theater bug and the chance at last to be onstage propel Willie into a fantasy in which he is surrounded by all of his idols, the dancers Fred Astaire, Bill "Bojangles" Robinson, Gene Kelly, The Nicholas Brothers, Dipsey, and Daddy Bates. They dance with him in his dream ("Dance If It Makes You Happy").

Willie auditions the next day and receives the part. Without celebration, Ginnie takes him and Emma to Dipsey and Carole's house to wait for William and prepare for his reaction to the news. William arrives, and when Ginnie tells him the news, he is outraged. The family is speechless and nervously cowers in front of William before Emma stands up to him. Her speech, coupling the courtroom savvy of a seasoned professional with the vulnerability of a hurt child, is a powerful indictment against William for alienation of affection and loss of aid to dependent children. Ginnie tells William that things cannot continue this way. She demands to have authority equal to his, in their family. William explodes and, in a frightening display, pours out his deep-rooted anguish and self-hatred to the family ("William's Song").

Later, alone in front of Dipsey's building, William waits, not knowing what will happen. Emma joins him, and she and her father finally reach an understanding. Willie arrives and tells William that he is not taking the part in the show but still longs to be a dancer. Ginnie appears, followed by Dipsey, and they both make peace with William. They all compromise a little, but they will remain together as a family ("Class Act [Finale]").

== Musical numbers ==
=== Original Broadway Production ===
Act I

- Another Day — Ginnie, Emma, and Willie
- Four Strikes Against Me — Emma
- Class Act — Ginnie, Dipsey, and Daddy Bates
- They Never Hear What I Say — Emma and Willie
- Dancing Is Everything — Willie
- Crosstown — Willie and New Yorkers
- Fabulous Feet — Dipsey, Carole, and Dancers
- I Could Get Used to Him — Carole
- Man in the Moon — Dipsey

Act II

- Like Him — Ginnie and Emma
- My Luck Is Changing — Dipsey
- I Remember How It Was — Ginnie
- Someday — Emma and Willie
- Lullabye — Ginnie
- Tap Tap — Daddy Bates, Willie, and Dipsey
- Dance If It Makes You Happy — Willie, Dipsey, Daddy Bates, Carole, and Dancers
- William's Song — William
- Class Act (Finale) — Willie, Emma, Ginnie, William, and Dipsey

=== National Tour ===
Act I

- Dipsey's Coming Over — Willie
- High Heels — Dipsey, Carole, Dancers
- Something Better, Something More — Dipsey
- Four Strikes Against Me — Emma
- Class Act — Ginnie, Dipsey, and Daddy Bates
- They Never Hear What I Say — Emma and Willie
- Dancing Is Everything — Willie
- Crosstown — Willie and New Yorkers
- Fabulous Feet — Dipsey, Carole, and Dancers
- I Could Get Used to Him — Carole
- Man in the Moon — Dipsey

Act II

- Like Him — Ginnie and Emma
- My Luck Is Changing — Dipsey
- I Remember How It Was — Ginnie
- Someday — Emma and Willie
- Lullabye — Ginnie
- Tap Tap — Daddy Bates, Willie, and Dipsey
- Dance If It Makes You Happy — Willie, Dipsey, Daddy Bates, Carole, and Dancers
- William's Song — William
- Class Act (Finale) — Willie, Emma, Ginnie, William, and Dipsey

Note: Most productions subsequent to the National Tour, including the Encores! production, follow the same song list as the National Tour production.

== Notable principal casts ==
Character	Broadway	US National Tour	NYCC Encores!
Character	1983	1985	2022
Willie Sheridan	Alfonso Ribeiro	Dulé Hill	Alexander Bello
Dipsey Bates	Hinton Battle	Hinton Battle	Trevor Jackson
Emma Sheridan	Martine Allard	Martine Allard	Shahadi Wright Joseph
Ginnie Sheridan	Hattie Winston	Monica Pege	Adrienne Walker
William Sheridan	Samuel E. Wright	Ben Harney	Joshua Henry
Carole	Jackie Lowe	Theresa Hayes	Tracee Beazer
Daddy Bates	Alan Weeks	Harold Nicholas	Dewitt Fleming Jr.
Winslow	Michael Blevins	Mark Santoro	Chance K. Smith

=== Notable replacements ===
- Broadway (1983–1985)
  - Willie: Savion Glover, Dulé Hill
  - Ginnie: Suzzanne Douglas
- US National Tour (1985–1986)
  - William: Chuck Cooper

== Productions ==
The musical opened on Broadway on December 21, 1983, at the Broadhurst Theatre and ran until March 11, 1984. On March 27, 1984, it resumed performances at the Minskoff Theatre, closing on August 11, 1985, for a total run of 669 performances. Directed by Vivian Matalon with musical staging and dances by Danny Daniels, it featured Hinton Battle, Samuel E. Wright, Hattie Winston, Martine Allard, and Alfonso Ribeiro as Willie. In 1984 Ribeiro's 10-year-old understudy, Savion Glover, took over the title role.

The reviews were mixed. Frank Rich, in his review for The New York Times, praised the choreography and many actors' performances but saw the plot as "earnest [but] plodding" and the music forgettable.

A production directed by Jerry Zaks with choreography by Danny Daniels ran at the Pantages Theatre, Los Angeles, California, in September 1985 as part of a tour. This production also ran in Miami Beach, Florida, in April 1986 and Chicago, Illinois, in May 1986.

As part of its "Encores!" program, New York City Center mounted a production running February 2–6, 2022. Lydia Diamond wrote the concert adaptation. Kenny Leon directed, with choreography by Jared Grimes.

== Awards and nominations ==
=== Original Broadway Production ===
Year	Award	Category	Nominee	Result
1984	Tony Award	Best Musical		Nominated
1984	Tony Award	Best Book of a Musical	Charles Blackwell	Nominated
1984	Tony Award	Best Performance by a Featured Actor in a Musical	Hinton Battle	Won
1984	Tony Award	Best Performance by a Featured Actor in a Musical	Samuel E. Wright	Nominated
1984	Tony Award	Best Performance by a Featured Actress in a Musical	Martine Allard	Nominated
1984	Tony Award	Best Direction of a Musical	Vivian Matalon	Nominated
1984	Tony Award	Best Choreography	Danny Daniels	Won
1984	Drama Desk Award	Outstanding Featured Actor in a Musical	Hinton Battle	Nominated
