= Vanessa Lee Chester =

American television and film actress

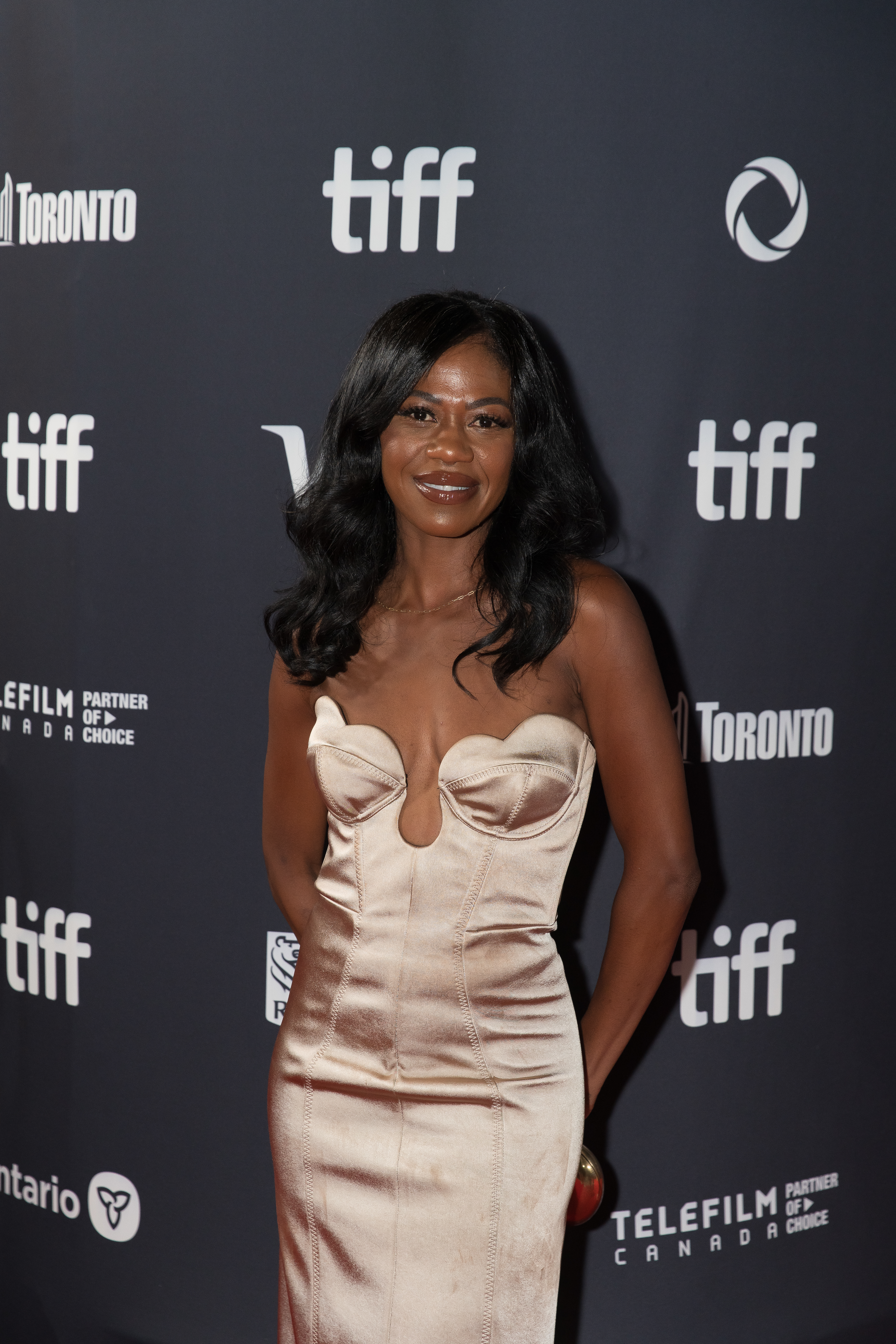
- Vanessa Lee Chester at the Toronto International Film Festival in 2025
- Education: University of Southern California
- Occupation: Actress
- Years active: 1992-present

Vanessa Lee Chester is an American actress who began her career as a child actor as Becky in the films A Little Princess (1995) and Janie Gibbs in Harriet the Spy (1996) before her breakthrough role as Kelly Curtis in Steven Spielberg's The Lost World: Jurassic Park (1997).

== Biography ==
Chester was born to Guyanese parents who immigrated to the United States. In her early childhood, she relocated with her mother to Los Angeles, where she began auditioning for and appearing in commercials. In 1993, Chester made her film debut as Talona in the 1993 comedy CB4 starring Chris Rock. In 1995, she appeared in a supporting role as Becky in Alfonso Cuarón's A Little Princess. In 1996, she appeared opposite Michelle Trachtenberg as Janie Gibbs in the Nickelodeon film Harriet the Spy, which was a moderate box office success. In 1997, she was cast in a lead role as Kelly Curtis in Steven Spielberg's The Lost World: Jurassic Park. The film was a box office hit, grossing $618.6 million worldwide against a $73-75 million budget. Chester later worked mostly in television, most notably appearing in Malcolm in the Middle and The West Wing. She was nominated for a Saturn Award, Image Award (The Lost World: Jurassic Park) and a Young Artist Award (A Little Princess) and winning for Best Performance in a Feature Film-Supporting Young Actress (Harriet The Spy). In early 2012, Chester began work on an unnamed film by Ty Hodges.

== Filmography ==
=== Film ===
Year	Title	Role	Notes
1993	CB4	Talona	
1995	A Little Princess	Becky	
1996	Harriet the Spy	Janie Gibbs	
1997	The Lost World: Jurassic Park	Kelly Curtis	
1999	She's All That	Melissa's Friend	
2006	The Shift	Daughter	Short
2008	Extreme Movie	Charlotte	
2009	17 Again	Cheerleader	
2014	The Costume Shop	Young Janie	
2014	The Arrangement	Emily Myers-Stanley	Short
2015	Fated	Eliza	Short
2026	The Napa Boys	Loretta	

=== Television ===
Year	Title	Role	Notes
1992	Hangin' with Mr. Cooper	Stephanie	Episode: "Miracle in Oaktown" (season 1, episode 10)
1994	Me and the Boys	Renee	Episode: "Every Good Boy Does Fine" (season 1, episode 6) Episode: "Talent Show" (season 1, episode 8)
1997	Happily Ever After: Fairy Tales for Every Child	School Child #3	Episode: "Goldilocks and the Three Bears" (season 2, episode 8)
1997	Promised Land	Emily Dixon	Episode: "Stealing Home: Part 1" (season 1, episode 23) Episode: "Stealing Home: Part 2" (season 1, episode 24)
1999	Get Real	Rude Girl	Episode: "Anatomy of a Rumor" (season 1, episode 5)
1999-2000	Once and Again	Friend #1 Annie	Episode: "Boy Meets Girl" (season 1, episode 1) 4 episodes
2000	Stepsister from Planet Weird	Michelle	TV movie
2000	Dreams in the Attic	Angel	
2002	Family Law	Girl #1	Episode: "Celano v. Foster" (season 3, episode 16)
2002	Malcolm in the Middle	Student #3	Episode: "Humilithon" (season 4, episode 2)
2004	Crossing Jordan	Andrea	Episode: "Most Likely" (season 3, episode 8)
2005	Without a Trace	Dori	Episode: "Lost Time" (season 4, episode 4)
2006	The West Wing	Youth Voter #2	Episode: "Duck and Cover" (season 7, episode 12)
2006	Veronica Mars	Maureen Thorthon	Episode: "I Am God" (season 2, episode 18)
2006	Justice	2nd Mock Juror	Episode: "Filicide" (season 1, episode 10)
2010	Lone Star	Tamar Wilson	Episode: "Small Time" (season 1, episode 4)
2011	9ine	Candace	Episode: "May" (season 1, episode 9)
2011	Switched at Birth	Lizzy	Episode: "The Stag Hunt" (season 1, episode 7)
2011	Reconstruction	Eleanor	TV movie
2012	How I Met Your Mother	Mia	Episode: "The Autumn of Break-Ups" (season 8, episode 5)
2013	Welcome to Sanditon	Letitia "Griff" Griffiths	4 episodes
2015	Scorpion	Secretary	Episode: "Cliffhanger" (season 1, episode 21)
2016	Ladies Like Us: The Rise of Neighborhood Watch	Natalia	Episode: "In a Matrix" (season 1, episode 4)
2019	Shameless	Mallory	Episode: "The Hobo Games" (season 9, episode 11)
2019	Dollface	Guy's Girl #4	Episode: "Guy's Girl" (season 1, episode 1)
2019	The Coop	Melissa	4 episodes
2021	Summer Camp Island	Nancy (voice)	Episode: "Betsy and the Ghost Chapter 3: There's a Racket in My Hope Chest" (season 5, episode 6)
