= Julie Talen =

Julie Talen is a writer and experimental filmmaker best known for her work with multi-channel narrative. Her directorial debut, the digital feature, Pretend, premiered at the Lincoln Center’s New York Video Festival in 2003.

== Biography ==
Talen graduated from Brown College and the Columbia University School of Journalism.

Talen has written for the Village Voice, American Film and the Los Angeles Weekly, and was a contributing editor to Channels Magazine. She assistant-edited an award-winning Merchant/Ivory documentary and worked as a researcher and assistant producer on the original reality series, Unsolved Mysteries. Her studio screenwriting assignments began in 1991, through a spec script – A Simple Wedding – which was eventually sold to Douglas Wick at Columbia Pictures and was selected by the LA Reader as one of the ten best unproduced scripts of 1992. She has since written adaptations and original screenplays and worked with Gillian Armstrong, Paul Verhoeven and Robert Altman. She shared credit on the 1996 Paramount film Harriet the Spy starring Rosie O'Donnell and directed by fellow New Yorker Bronwyn Hughes.

Talen's directorial debut, Pretend, uses an array of multiple frames and graphics to tell the story of a troubled family living in upstate New York. A.O. Scott of The New York Times called Pretend a “harrowing, dazzling feature.” In Sixty Cameras Against the War (2004), Talen created an assemblage of random digital videos taken during an anti-war rally held in New York City on Feb 15, 2003, just days before the invasion of Iraq. The film was shown at the Whitney Museum of American Art.
