= Water Mill, New York =

- Hamlet and census-designated place
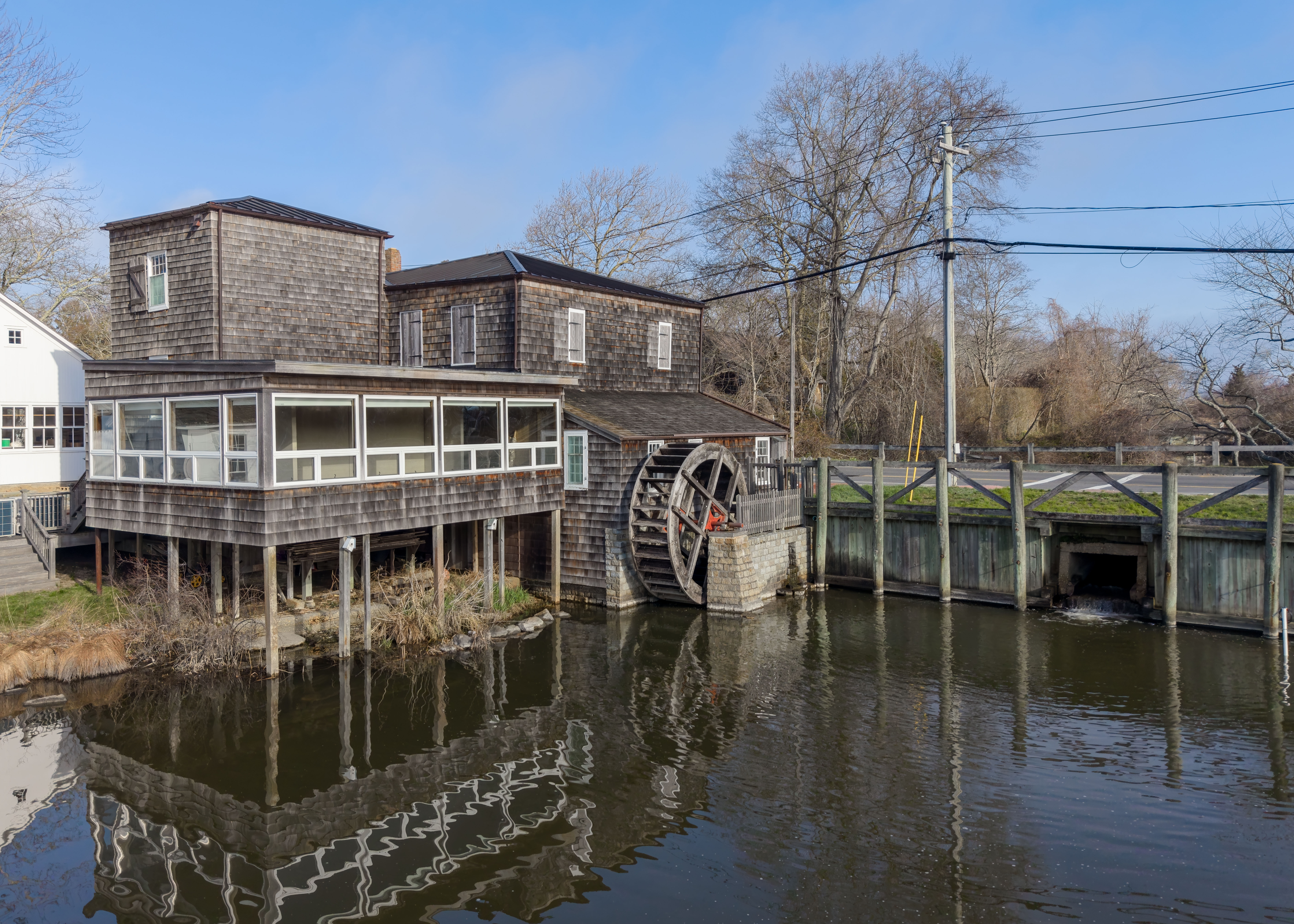
- Water Mill derives its name from a claim that the first watermill in New York was built there in 1644.

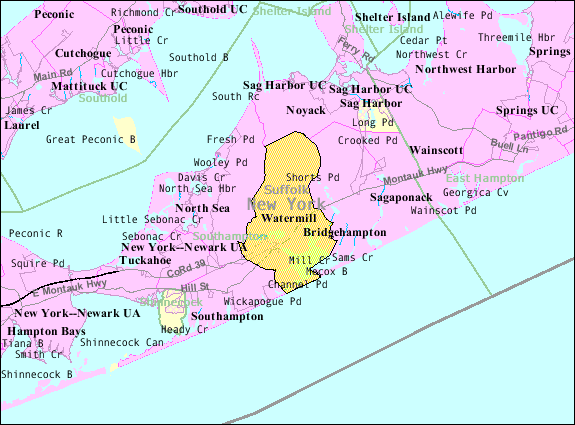

- Location within New York
- Coordinates: 40°55′0″N 72°20′50″W
- Country: United States
- State: New York
- County: Suffolk

Area
  - Total: 12.79 sq mi (33.13 km^{2})
  - Land: 10.58 sq mi (27.39 km^{2})
  - Water: 2.21 sq mi (5.73 km^{2})
- Elevation: 39 ft (12 m)

Population (2020)
  - Total: 2,506
  - Density: 236.9/sq mi (91.48/km^{2})
- Time zone: UTC−5 (Eastern (EST))
  - Summer (DST): UTC−4 (EDT)
- ZIP Code: 11976
- Area code: 631
- FIPS code: 36-78575
- GNIS feature ID: 1867422

Water Mill is a hamlet and a census-designated place (CDP) within the Town of Southampton on Long Island in Suffolk County, New York, United States. As of the 2020 census, Water Mill had a population of 2,506. Its ZIP Code is 11976.

As of 2024, Water Mill is the third most expensive ZIP Code in the United States and the second most expensive ZIP code in New York State. The median home price was $5,885,000.

== History ==
In 1644, England gave Edward Howell 40 acres (16 ha) of land near the new settlement of Southampton to build a mill for settlers to grind their grain into meal. It became a landmark, and people began referring to other settlements that popped up as "east or west of the watermill." By the 1800s, the area was known as Water Mills and was later changed to Water Mill. Howell's Water Mill was listed on the National Register of Historic Places in 1983. Today, the hamlet boasts its status as the only settlement on the South Fork of Long Island with both a functioning watermill and windmill. Both the Watermill (ref#83004175) and the James Corwith gristmill (ref#78001919) are landmarked in the NRHP. Today Water Mill is a resort community of beautiful beaches, farms and mega mansions. Celebrities and public figures such as Richard Gere, Jennifer Lopez, Matt Lauer, Senator Frank Lautenberg, Steven Schwartzman and Bruce Blakeman own homes or have vacationed there. Louise Fitzhugh's young adult novel The Long Secret takes place in Water Mill.

In November 2012 the Parrish Art Museum opened in Water Mill after relocating from Southampton where it was founded in 1898.

In June 2025, former chief Hillary Clinton staffer Huma Abedin married Alex Soros, son of billionaire George Soros at the Soros Family estate in Water Mill; the guest list included prominent Democratic Party figures and Edi Rama, former PM of Albania.

== Geography ==
Water Mill is located at 40° 55' 0" North, 72° 20' 50" West (40.916759, -72.347225). According to the United States Census Bureau, the CDP has a total area of 12.0 square miles (31.1 km^{2}), of which 10.5 square miles (27.3 km^{2}) is land and 1.5 square miles (3.8 km^{2}), or 12.34%, is water.

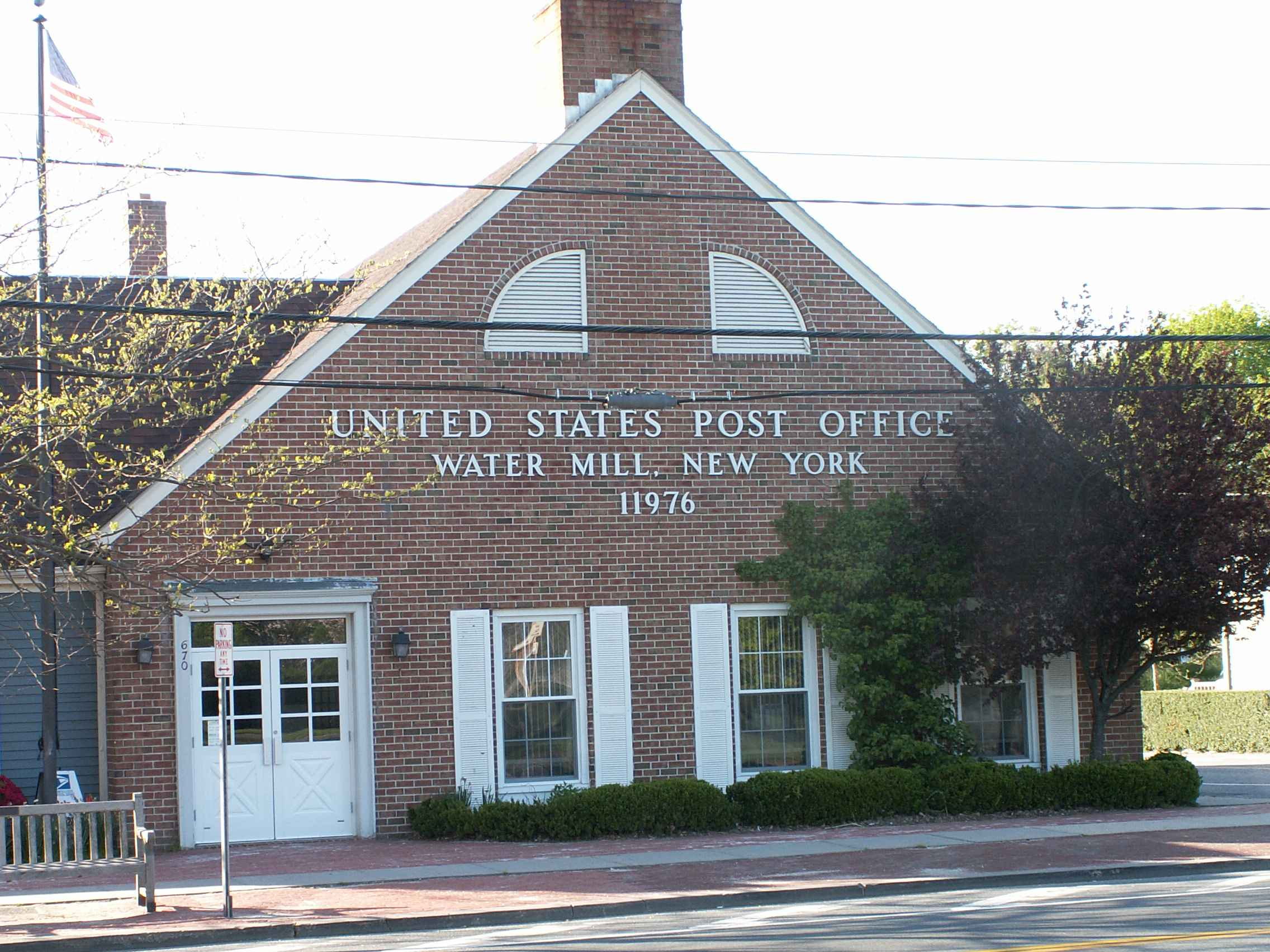
The U.S. post office in Water Mill

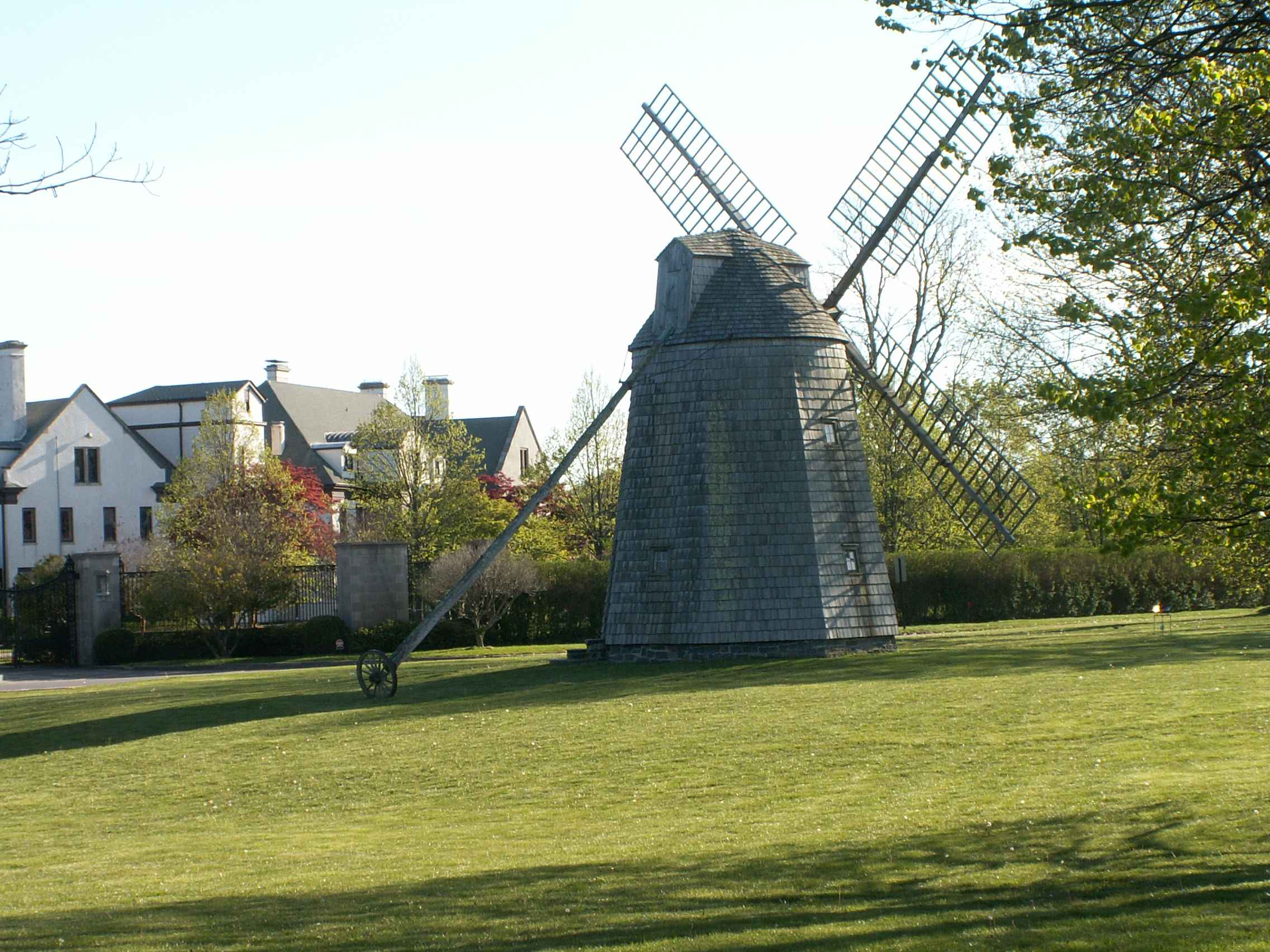
Old Wind Mill on the town green across from the Villa Maria convent

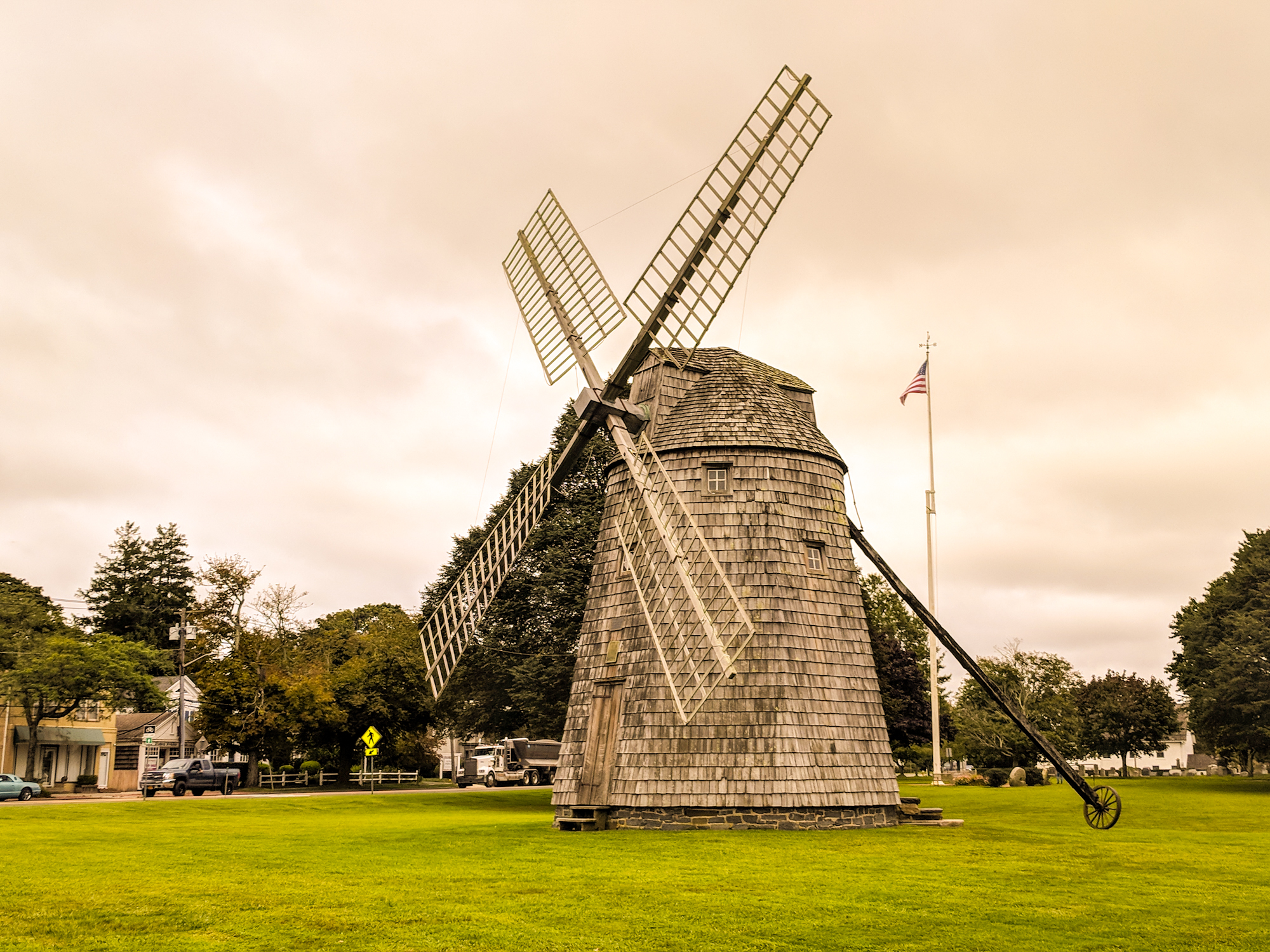
Corwith Windmill, Water Mill, NY

Historical population
Census	Pop.	Note	%±
2020	2,506		—
U.S. Decennial Census

== Demographics ==
As of the census of 2000, there were 1,724 people, 722 households, and 475 families residing in the CDP. The population density was 156.8 inhabitants per square mile (60.5/km^{2}). There were 1,461 housing units at an average density of 132.9 per square mile (51.3/km^{2}). The racial makeup of the CDP was 95.42% White, 2.49% African American, 0.70% Asian, 0.93% from other races, and 0.46% from two or more races. Hispanic or Latino of any race were 3.31% of the population.

There were 722 households, out of which 24.4% had children under the age of 18 living with them, 57.2% were married couples living together, 5.8% had a female householder with no husband present, and 34.2% were non-families. 25.9% of all households were made up of individuals, and 10.9% had someone living alone who was 65 years of age or older. The average household size was 2.38 and the average family size was 2.85.

In the CDP, the population was spread out, with 20.1% under the age of 18, 4.6% from 18 to 24, 24.0% from 25 to 44, 31.5% from 45 to 64, and 19.8% who were 65 years of age or older. The median age was 46 years. For every 100 females, there were 100.7 males. For every 100 females age 18 and over, there were 100.7 males.

The median income for a household in the CDP was $84,400, and the median income for a family was $84,272. Males had a median income of $60,357 versus $39,167 for females. The per capita income for the CDP was $59,987. About 4.9% of families and 8.3% of the population were below the poverty line, including 4.0% of those under age 18 and 2.4% of those age 65 or over.
