= The Long Secret =

Book by Louise Fitzhugh

- First edition
- Author: Louise Fitzhugh
- Illustrator: Louise Fitzhugh
- Series: Harriet the Spy
- Genre: Children's spy novel
- Published: October 27, 1965
- Publisher: Harper & Row
- Publication place: United States
- Media type: Print
- Pages: 275 (first ed.)
- ISBN: 0060214104
- OCLC: 70458678
- LC Class: PZ7.F5768 Lo
- Preceded by: Harriet the Spy
- Followed by: Sport

The Long Secret is a children's novel written and illustrated by Louise Fitzhugh that was released by Harper & Row on October 27, 1965. It is a sequel or "companion" to Harriet the Spy (1964), the only one published during Fitzhugh's lifetime.

Sport, another sequel to Harriet written by Fitzhugh, was published by the Dell imprint Delacorte Press in 1979.

== Plot summary ==
Harriet and her family are spending their summer in the beach town of Water Mill, Long Island. Her summertime friend, twelve-year-old Beth Ellen Hanson, sometimes called Mouse, is also in Water Mill with her paternal grandmother. Mysterious anonymous notes start showing up all over town; they have a religious slant and expose the "sins" of the recipients. Harriet is determined to find out who is leaving them, and suspects anyone who reads the Bible.

Harriet drags Beth Ellen along on spying expeditions directed against Bunny, the piano-playing manager of the local hotel, and the Jenkinses, an eccentric southern family preoccupied with moneymaking schemes. Harriet's other friend Janie Gibbs and Mrs Agatha K. Plumber from Harriet the Spy also appear.

Beth Ellen learns that her entitled rich mother, Zeeney, who left when she was five, is returning from Europe with her new husband, Wallace. Her grandmother expects Beth Ellen to be excited by the news, but she is indifferent. Zeeney turns out to be a beautiful but shallow socialite who is dissatisfied with her introverted daughter and tries to make her over in her image. Later, she announces her plans to take Beth Ellen with her when she leaves.

Beth Ellen's dislike of her mother finally explodes. First she throws a tantrum, but then realizes she can achieve freedom through education and a profession. When Zeeney laughs at these plans, Beth Ellen announces her refusal to go with her mother. As the summer ends, she becomes much happier, without a mother but free to be her own person.
