= Suzuki Beane =

1961 novel by Sandra Scoppettone

First edition (publ. Doubleday)

Suzuki Beane is a humor book written in 1961 by Sandra Scoppettone and illustrated by Louise Fitzhugh. The novel is a downtown satire on Kay Thompson's Eloise series (1956–59). First published in hardcover by Doubleday & Company, Suzuki Beane reappeared as a McFadden Books paperback that same year.

The story, sometimes described as "the Eloise of Greenwich Village", is told from the viewpoint of a young child of Bleecker Street beatniks. Little Suzuki encounters a different lifestyle when she becomes friends with Henry Martin, a rich kid from the Upper East Side. The two learn about life, love and how to deal with prejudice in the early 1960s. The pair finally decide to "run away from home and start a village where a Square can be a square and a swinging cat can swing in peace".

Desilu purchased the rights in 1962 for a possible adaptation of the characters for development and inclusion into a live-action television series starring comedian-musician Victor Borge. A television pilot was made, with Katie Sweet as Suzuki and Jimmy Garrett as Henry, but the series was not picked up.
