= Louise Fitzhugh =

American novelist

- Born: October 5, 1928; Memphis, Tennessee, U.S.
- Died: November 19, 1974 (aged 46); New Milford, Connecticut, U.S.
- Occupations: Writer, illustrator
- Writing career
- Period: 1959–1974
- Genres: Children's and young adult fiction
- Notable work: Harriet the Spy

Louise Perkins Fitzhugh (October 5, 1928 – November 19, 1974) was an American writer and illustrator of children's books. Fitzhugh is best known for her 1964 novel Harriet The Spy, about an adolescent girl who to keeps a journal recording the foibles of her friends, classmates, and captivating strangers. The novel was later adapted into a live action film in 1996. The sequel novel, The Long Secret, was published in 1965, and its follow-up book, Sport, was published posthumously in 1979. Fitzhugh also wrote Nobody's Family Is Going to Change, which was later adapted into a short film and a Broadway musical.

Fitzhugh died at age 46 from a brain aneurysm on November 19, 1974.

== Early life and family ==
Louise Fitzhugh was born in Memphis, Tennessee, on October 5, 1928, as the only child of Louise and Millsaps Fitzhugh, a lawyer. Her father came from a wealthy family in Memphis, and she is a descendant of Reuben Millsaps, the founder of Millsaps College in Jackson, Mississippi. He graduated from Emory University and met Louise Perkins, an aspiring tap dancer, in 1926 on a boat traveling from New York to England. They married, but his family disapproved of the marriage due to her lower social standing and they divorced after a year, shortly following Fitzhugh's birth in 1928. Her father gained custody of her after a publicized legal battle while her mother moved to Hollywood. She grew up in Memphis with her father and stepmother, Sally Taylor, and was told that her mother was dead. Her father went on to become a U.S. district attorney. When Fitzhugh was a teenager, she discovered the truth while working at the Memphis newspaper, The Commercial Appeal and finding coverage of the divorce proceedings in the archive. She began writing at the age of 11.

She graduated in 1946 from Miss Hutchison's School where she had been popular, but felt out of place as a debutante in upper-class society, and was appalled by her peers' racist attitudes. Fitzhugh had a series of romantic relationships as teenager, beginning with a boy named Charles McNutt. After dating for two years, she fell in love with a photojournalist named Amelia Brent, her first love affair with another woman. While still seeing Amelia, she also dated a local boy named Ed Thompson, and eloped with him in 1947, at the age of nineteen. The marriage went unconsummated and her father had it annulled from Memphis.

== Education ==
Fitzhugh briefly attended Southwestern College (now Rhodes College) after graduating from Miss Hutchison's, and transferred to Florida Southern College in 1947. In 1948, she transferred again, this time to Bard College, after her uncle, novelist Peter Taylor, recommended its writing program. She studied child psychology and literature under poet James Merrill at Bard, but left in 1951, six months before her graduation.

Using money inherited after her grandmother's death in 1949, Fitzhugh moved to New York City to study art. She lived in Greenwich Village and studied at the Art Students League and Cooper Union starting in 1952. She also traveled to study art in France in 1954, and Bologna in 1957.

== Career ==
In 1961, Fitzhugh published her first children's book, Suzuki Beane, coauthored with Sandra Scoppettone, which was a parody of Eloise; while Eloise lived in the Plaza Hotel, Suzuki was the daughter of beatnik parents and slept on a mattress on the floor of a Bleecker Street pad in Greenwich Village. Fitzhugh worked closely with Scoppettone on the production of the book, which incorporated typewriter font and line drawings in an original way. Although a parody of both Eloise and beatnik conceit, the book sprang to life as a genuine work of literature and was immediately popular with both adults and children.

Fitzhugh continued to be a successful painter in New York, showing her work, primarily realistic portraits, nudes, and city scenes, alongside artists like Jacob Lawrence, Ad Reinhardt, and Louise Nevelson. She had a particularly successful solo exhibition at Banfer Gallery in 1963, but also wrote prolifically, penning several plays and adult novels that were never published. Around this time, Fitzhugh attempted to publish Amelia, a novel about two teenage girls falling in love, in remembrance of her first love Amelia Brent, who had died apparently by suicide in 1956. The manuscript was rejected by an agent for its lesbian subject matter, and later disappeared.

=== Harriet The Spy ===
After the success of Suzuki Beane, Fitzhugh began working with editors Ursula Nordstrom and Charlotte Zolotow, who helped publish her most successful work, Harriet The Spy, through Harper and Row. It was published in 1964 to some controversy, since its characters were flawed and engaged in behavior that many felt wasn't suitable for children. Although it received many negative reviews at the time of its publication, It was hugely popular with young girls, and has since become a classic. It is also considered a milestone book for introducing "a new realism to children's fiction. Harriet is the daughter of affluent New Yorkers who leave her in the care of her nanny, Ole Golly, in their Manhattan townhouse. A curious and solitary child, she spends her time spying on other people, often her friends and neighbors, recording her cynical and bluntly rude observations in a notebook.

The book has been adapted three times, starting in 1996 with a film starring Michelle Trachtenberg and Rosie O'Donnell. In 2010, it was adapted as the Disney movie, Harriet The Spy: Blog Wars and in 2021 as an animated series by Apple TV+ starring Beanie Feldstein.

The book and Harriet's tomboyish character is often linked to Fitzhugh's identity as a lesbian despite a lack of direct references to homosexuality. The character was based on Marijane Meaker as well as some of Fitzhugh's own experiences. Irene Zahava dedicated The Second Womansleuth Anthology to Harriet and fictional lesbian detective characters created by Elizabeth Pincus and Bonnie Morris cite Harriet as a childhood influence.

She wrote two other books in the same universe, The Long Secret and Sport.

=== Posthumous publications and adaptations ===
Several of Fitzhugh's books were published posthumously, including Nobody's Family is Going to Change, published eight days after her death in 1974. Nobody's Family Is Going to Change was adapted into the short film The Tap Dance Kid for Special Treat in 1978. It was also adapted into the 1983 Tony-nominated musical The Tap Dance Kid.

Other posthumous publications included Sport (1979), I Am Five (1978), I am Four (1982), and I Am Three (1982). According to her biographer, Virginia L. Wolf, Fitzhugh had left two adult fiction works at the time of her death, an unfinished novel, "Crazybaby," and a completed play, "Mother Sweet, Father Sweet."

== Personal life ==
Fitzhugh was a lesbian. Fitzhugh was romantically linked to actress Constance Ford, casting director Alixe Gordin, and her Suzuki Beane collaborator, Sandra Scoppettone.

== Death ==
Fitzhugh died on November 19, 1974, at a New Milford, Connecticut hospital of a brain aneurysm.

== Works ==
=== Novels ===
- Harriet The Spy (Harper & Row, 1964)
- The Long Secret (Harper & Row, 1965) – sequel to Harriet The Spy
- Nobody's Family Is Going to Change (Farrar, Straus and Giroux, 1974), LCCN 74-19152
- Sport (Delacorte, 1979) – posthumously published quasi-sequel to Harriet, LCCN 78-72861

=== Children's books ===
- Bang, Bang, You're Dead, (co-written with Sandra Scoppettone), illus. Fitzhugh (Harper & Row, 1969), LCCN 69-14440
- I Am Five, written and illus. by Fitzhugh (Delacorte Press, 1978), LCCN 78-50404
- I Am Four, illus. Susan Bonners (Delacorte, 1982), LCCN 82-70309
- I Am Three, illus. Susanna Natti (Delacorte, 1982), LCCN 81-15218

=== As illustrator only ===
- Suzuki Beane, written by Sandra Scoppettone, (Doubleday, 1961), LCCN 61-7513

== Awards ==
- New York Times Outstanding Books of the Year citation, 1964
- Oklahoma Sequoyah Book Award, 1967 (Harriet The Spy)

Posthumous

- Children's Book Bulletin, 1976 (Nobody's Family Is Going to Change)
- Children's Workshop Other Award, 1976 (Nobody's Family Is Going to Change)
- Emmy Award for children's entertainment special (The Tap Dance Kid, based on Nobody's Family Is Going to Change).
