= Harriet the Spy =

1964 children's novel by Louise Fitzhugh

- First edition cover
- Author: Louise Fitzhugh
- Illustrator: Louise Fitzhugh
- Genre: Children's spy novel
- Publisher: Harper & Row
- Publication date: 1964
- Media type: Print (hardcover)
- Pages: 298 (first ed.)
- ISBN: 978-0-440-41679-1
- OCLC: 301132
- LC Class: PZ7.F5768 Har
- Followed by: The Long Secret

Harriet the Spy is a children's novel written and illustrated by Louise Fitzhugh that was published in 1964. It has been called "a milestone in children's literature" and a "classic". In the U.S., it ranked number 12 in the 50 Best Books for Kids and number 17 in the Top 100 Children's Novels on two lists generated in 2012.

It was followed by two "companion books", the sequels, The Long Secret (1965) and Sport (1979), the latter of which was released after Fitzhugh's death in 1974. A feature film based on the novel starring Michelle Trachtenberg was released by Nickelodeon Movies in 1996. A made-for-television sequel, Harriet the Spy: Blog Wars, aired in 2010. A television series based on the novel premiered on Apple TV+ in 2021.

== Plot summary ==
Eleven-year-old Harriet M. Welsch is an aspiring writer who lives in New York City's Upper East Side. Encouraged by her nanny, "Ole Golly", Harriet observes others and writes her thoughts down in a notebook as practice for her future career. Several standalone episodes highlight the various eccentric characters she meets on her afternoon "spy route".

Harriet's best friends are Simon "Sport" Rocque, a serious boy who wants to be a certified public accountant or a ball player, and Janie Gibbs, who wants to be a scientist. Harriet's enemies in her class are Marion Hawthorne, the teacher's pet and self-appointed queen bee, and Marion's best friend, Rachel Hennessy.

Harriet's life changes abruptly when Ole Golly's suitor, Mr. Waldenstein, proposes and she accepts. Harriet is crushed by the loss of her nanny. Her mother and father are at a loss to understand Harriet's feelings and are of little comfort to her.

At school, during a game of tag, Harriet loses her notebook. Her classmates find it and are appalled at her brutally honest documentation of her opinions of them. The students form a "Spy Catcher Club" in which they think up ways to make Harriet's life miserable, such as stealing her lunch and passing nasty notes about her in class. In return, Harriet regularly spies on the Spy Catcher Club through a back fence and concocts vengeful ways to punish them. After getting into trouble for carrying out some of her plans, Harriet unsuccessfully tries to resume her friendships with Sport and Janie as if nothing had ever happened. When Harriet's grades go down, her parents confiscate her notebook, which only depresses her further.

Harriet's mother takes her daughter to see a child psychiatrist, who advises Harriet's parents to get in touch with Ole Golly and ask her to write to Harriet. In her letter, Ole Golly tells Harriet that if anyone ever reads her notebook, "you have to do two things, and you are not going to like either one of them. 1: You have to apologize. 2: You have to lie. Otherwise you are going to lose a friend."

Meanwhile, dissension is rippling through the Spy Catcher Club. Marion and Rachel are calling all the shots, and Sport and Janie are tired of being bossed around. When they quit the club, most of their classmates do the same.

Harriet's parents speak with her teacher and the headmistress, and Harriet is appointed editor of the class newspaper, replacing Marion. The newspaper—featuring stories about the people on Harriet's spy route and the students' parents—becomes an instant success. Harriet also uses the paper to print a retraction of the things she had written in her journal. Harriet is forgiven by Sport and Janie.

== Reception ==
The book appeared on a 1964 list of "The Year's Best Juveniles" in The New York Times Book Review. One 1965 reviewer called the book "a brilliantly written, unsparing realistic story, a superb portrait of an extraordinary child". Another reviewer found that it "captures the feelings, thoughts and situations of a modern city child with remarkable clarity and dimension". Nevertheless, at least one reviewer in 1965 felt that the book dealt with "disagreeable people and situations". Although it was not chosen as one of the American Library Association (ALA) Notable Books for Children for 1964, years later it was included in a retrospective 1960–1964 ALA Notable Books List.

It won a Sequoyah Book Award in 1967. The paperback version was selected as one of the "Best in the Field" published during the previous 16 months in a 1968 New York Times article. In 1995, Paramount Pictures and Nickelodeon Movies claimed that 2.5 million copies of the book had been sold; however, the book did not appear on a 2001 Publishers Weekly list of "hardcovers that have sold 750,000 copies and paperbacks that have topped the one million copy mark."

Whitney Matheson wrote on the USA Today site in 2002 that Harriet "attracts dedicated, lifelong supporters". Anita Silvey in 2004 selected it as one of the 100 best books for children. In 2005, the ex-CIA officer Lindsay Moran cited the Harriet the Spy series of books as an inspiration for her career. It was included in a 2009 list of "Children’s Classics" by The Horn Book Magazine.

In 2012, Harriet the Spy was ranked number 17 among all-time children's novels in a survey published by School Library Journal. Earlier that year, Time Out New York Kids ranked it number 12 among the "50 Best Books for Kids". Late in 2015, the same source ranked it number 34 in the "73 best kids' books of all time for families".

Despite its popularity, the book has been banned from some schools and libraries "because it was said to set a bad example for children". Along with Are You There God?, Blubber, and Where the Sidewalk Ends, the book was challenged at a 1983 school-board meeting in Xenia, Ohio. Proponents of the Xenia ban stated that the book "teaches children to lie, spy, back-talk, and curse", but the board voted to keep the books in the school libraries.

== Selected translations ==
- Harriet - Spionage aller Art (German, 1968)
- Harijeta uhoda (Serbian, Yugoslavia, 1978)
- Harriet l'Espionne (French, 1980)
- הרייט המרגלת (Hebrew, 1984, ISBN 9650302190)
- Professione? Spia! (Italian, 1989, ISBN 8804322802)
- スパイになりたいハリエットのいじめ解決法 / Supai ni naritai harietto no ijime kaiketsuhō (Japanese, 1995, ISBN 4061947303)
- A Espiã (Portuguese, 1999, ISBN 8571646414)
- Spiunia Harrietë (Albanian, 2016, ISBN 9789928219091)

== Series ==
Fitzhugh wrote two sequels to the book: The Long Secret (1965) and Sport (1979, published posthumously). Both books received mixed reviews.

Sport is a spin-off that focuses on Simon "Sport" Rocque, expanding upon his brief family background covered in Harriet the Spy. As his parents are divorced, Sport lives with his father, who is a struggling writer who has been focusing on a book (a big gamble) rather than the steady income of journal/newspaper articles, with Sport managing their finances. Their financial problems are exacerbated once Sport's grandfather Simon Vane (from his mother's side) becomes terminally ill and stops sending regular payments to Sport. Things change for the better once Sport's father meets the kind Kate, who becomes a good stepmother. However, Simon's will has named Sport as the main beneficiary to the $30 million family fortune, much to the chagrin of Sport's mother Charlotte Vane and her sister. Charlotte, an absentee mother who has been living well abroad in Europe most of the time, returns to New York City upon hearing of her father's illness, scheming to increase her share of Simon's inheritance by kidnapping Sport and imprisoning him in the Plaza Hotel for a week.

In 2002, a sequel Harriet Spies Again appeared; written by Helen Ericson, it also received mixed reviews. Another sequel, Harriet the Spy, Double Agent by Maya Gold, was published in 2005; one review of that book stated "there's not much to interest readers here."

- Harriet the Spy (Harper & Row, 1964); also Harriet, the Spy
- The Long Secret (Harper & Row, 1965)
- Sport (Dell Publishing/Delacorte Press, 1979), Fitzhugh
- Harriet Spies Again (Dell/Delacorte, 2002), Helen Ericson [and Fitzhugh]
- Harriet the Spy, DoubleAgent (Dell/Delacorte, 2005), Maya Gold and Fitzhugh

== Adaptations ==
Film rights to the novel were bought by Herbert Swope in 1964. Harriet the Spy was made into a 1996 film of the same name. It starred Michelle Trachtenberg and was the first film to be produced by Nickelodeon's feature film division.

In September 2004, Mainframe Entertainment announced that Protocol Entertainment will produce a new Harriet the Spy live-action television series, consisting of at least 22 half-hour episodes, with 2 Friends Entertainment acting as executive producers and US sales agent and Mainframe retaining international distribution rights.

In March 2010, Disney Channel aired a version of the story, Harriet the Spy: Blog Wars. This starred Wizards of Waverly Place cast member Jennifer Stone as Harriet, Alexander Conti from Cheaper by the Dozen 2 as Harriet's friend Sport, and Degrassi: The Next Generation's Melinda Shankar as Janie. In this film, Harriet competes against Marion Hawthorne to see who has a better blog.

In August 2020, Apple TV+ announced it had given the production a series order for an animated television adaptation of the novel. The series was to be produced by The Jim Henson Company and Rehab Entertainment with Will McRobb as writer, Sidney Clifton as producer, and Terissa Kelton and John W. Hyde as executive producers, and starring Beanie Feldstein as Harriet, Jane Lynch as Ole Golly, and Lacey Chabert as Marion Hawthorne. The series was released on November 19, 2021.
