= The Kissing Hand =

American children's picture book featuring anthropomorphic raccoons

- Author: Audrey Penn
- Illustrator: Ruth E. Harper and Nancy M. Leak
- Language: English
- Genre: Children's literature
- Publisher: Child Welfare League of America
- Publication date: 1993
- Publication place: United States
- Media type: Print (hardback)
- Pages: 32 pp (first edition)
- Followed by: A Pocket Full of Kisses

The Kissing Hand is an American children's picture book written by Audrey Penn and illustrated by Ruth E. Harper and Nancy M. Leak. It features a mother raccoon comforting a child raccoon by kissing its paw. First published by the Child Welfare League of America in 1993, it has been used "to reassure children upset by separation anxiety."

Based on a 2007 online poll, the National Education Association listed the book as one of its "Teachers' Top 100 Books for Children." It was one of the "Top 100 Picture Books" of all time in a 2012 poll by School Library Journal. It has been translated into at least five languages and has been followed by five sequels.

== Background ==
On a train ride in Wheaton, Maryland, Penn witnessed a ritual in which a mother raccoon placed its nose on a baby raccoon's paw, and then the baby raccoon placed its paw on its own face. The park ranger said that the purpose of the ritual was to transfer scent from the mother to the baby so that the baby could recall the mother's scent by bringing its paw to its face. Penn "started a similar ritual with her daughter — kissing her hand and telling her that whenever she was homesick, she could put her hand to her face."

Penn wrote The Kissing Hand based on the raccoons' ritual. Penn read the book at VSA arts, and Jean Kennedy Smith wrote the book's foreword.

== Summary ==
Chester is a young raccoon who is nervous about going to school. His mother kisses the center of his palm, telling him that whenever he feels lonely and needs a little loving from home, just press his hand to his cheek and think about his mom who loves him. Chester is comforted and he eventually goes to school.

== Reception ==
In 1994 the book received a negative review in the School Library Journal, which considered it "marketing" for the Child Welfare League of America, with a "didactic story" and low-quality illustrations. Nevertheless, in 1998 Scholastic Corporation published a paperback version which became one of its "biggest, most popular best sellers."

The American Library Association recommended the book after the September 11 attacks of 2001. In 2004, the United States Army purchased 14,000 copies of the book for soldiers stationed abroad to read on video and transmit the video to their families at home.

It was ranked #49 in a 2007 online poll by the National Education Association of "Teachers' Top 100 Books for Children." It was ranked #95 in a list of "Top 100 Picture Books" of all time in a 2012 poll by School Library Journal.

== Editions and translations ==
- Penn, Audrey (1993). The kissing hand. Washington, DC: Child Welfare League of America. ISBN 0878685855. (hardcover)
- Penn, Audrey (1998). The kissing hand. New York: Scholastic. ISBN 0590047019. (paperback)
- Penn, Audrey (1998). The kissing hand. New York: Scholastic. ISBN 0590375679. (cassette tape and paperback)
- Penn, Audrey (2001). Un beso en mi mano (in Spanish). Washington, DC: Child & Family Press. ISBN 0878688226.
- Penn, Audrey (2004). The Kissing Hand. Livonia, MI: Seedlings Braille Books for Children. ISBN 0590047019. OCLC 138422234. (Braille)
- Penn, Audrey (2007). The kissing hand. Terre Haute, IN: Tanglewood Audio. ISBN 9781933718101. (CD and paperback)
- Penn, Audrey (2007). Le bisou secret (in French). Toronto: Éditions Scholastic. ISBN 9780545998345.
- Penn, Audrey (2007). 魔法親親 / Mo fa qin qin (in Chinese). Taipei: Shang yi wen hua shi ye gu fen you xian gong si. ISBN 9789577624444.
- Penn, Audrey (2007). The kissing hand: キスのおまじない (in Japanese). Tōkyō: Ashietto Fujin Gahōsha. ISBN 9784573080096.
- Penn, Audrey (2011). دستى که بوسه مى ذند / Dastī kih būsah mi zand (in Persian). Tihrān: Man va Kīmiya. ISBN 9789642360307.
- Penn, Audrey (2017). Поцелуй в ладошке (in Russian). St. Petersburg, Russia: Качели / Kachelly. ISBN 9785950045172.
- Penn, Audrey (2024). Поцілунок у долоньці (in Ukrainian). Київ, Україна: Риби на даху. ISBN 9786179538629.

== Sequels ==
- Penn, Audrey (2004). A pocket full of kisses. Washington, DC: Child & Family Press. ISBN 0878688943.
- Penn, Audrey (2007). A kiss goodbye. Terre Haute, IN: Tanglewood Press. ISBN 9781933718040.
- Penn, Audrey (2008). Chester Raccoon and the big bad bully. Terre Haute, IN: Tanglewood Press. ISBN 9781933718156.
- Penn, Audrey (2009). Chester Raccoon and the acorn full of memories. Terre Haute, IN: Tanglewood Press. ISBN 9781933718293.
- Penn, Audrey (2010). A bedtime kiss for Chester Raccoon. Terre Haute, IN: Tanglewood Press. ISBN 9781933718521.
- Penn, Audrey (2017). Chester Raccoon and the Almost Perfect Sleepover. Terre Haute, IN: Tanglewood Press. ISBN 9781939100115.
