= Audrey Penn =

American children's writer

- Occupation: Writer
- Writing career
- Genre: Children's books
- Website: audreypenn.com

Audrey Penn is an American children's writer. She is best known for writing The Kissing Hand, a picture book featuring anthropomorphic raccoons.

== Biography ==
Audrey Penn grew up in Silver Spring, Maryland. Audrey Penn didn’t start off her career as a writer. Penn, in the 1970s, was a ballerina dancer dancing for the New York City Ballet, Danny Diamond Dance Theatre, Stuttgart Ballet, and the National Ballet. Between 1973 and 1976 she was a choreographer for the US Figure Skating team for the Pan American Games and the 1976 Olympic Gymnastics Team. Penn's first book was Happy Apple Told Me. In 1980, after developing Juvenile Rheumatoid Arthritis, Penn was too ill to continue with ballet. Due to many painful surgeries and not being able to walk for weeks led her to write more books like Blue Out of Season and No Bones About Driftiss. Penn currently resides in Maryland with her husband and their three children.

== Awards ==
Audrey Penn's first book written in 1975, Happy Apple Told Me, won the Midstate Library Association Award and was nominated for the Caldecott Medal Award. Penn's second book, Blue Out of Season, won the Mid-State Library Association Award and Very Special Arts Recognition Award. Her best known book, The Kissing Hand, was a New York Times number one best seller and won the Distinguished Achievement Award for Excellence in Educational Journalism. In 2004, A Pocket Full of Kisses also was a New York Times number one best seller. (Retrieved from Audrey Penn's Official Website)

== Books ==
- Happy Apple Told Me (1975)

A story about a magical adventure to the stars.

- Blue Out of Season (1984)

The story is about flukes, which control the different seasons.

- No Bones About Driftiss (1989)

A group of kids finds some dinosaur bones and turns them into a museum.

- The Kissing Hand (1993)

The story is about a raccoon named Chester who is afraid to go to school and wants to stay home with mom. His mom reassures Chester that school is fun and gives him a kiss in his hand, so whenever he is feeling sad all he would have to do is put his hand to his face to feel his mom.

- Sassafras (1997)

This is about a skunk that doesn’t like how he's stinky and his friends make him realize that's what makes him special.

- A.D.D. Not B.A.D. (2002)

Jimmy has A.D.D and the other students can’t relate on why Jimmy does the things he does, so the teacher comes up with a plan so every student knows what it feels like to have A.D.D.

- Feathers and Fur (2003)

Tuesday is a cat, and Tuesday can't wait for 11 duck eggs to hatch. Tuesday has mixed feelings on whether to eat or greet the 11 ducks.

- The Whistling Tree (2004)

Penny is intrigued by her past, so her great-great uncle tells her about her past.

- A Pocket Full of Kisses (2004)

This is a sequel to the popular hit The Kissing Hand. Chester has a brand new baby brother, Ronny, who he wants to disappear. How will Chester deal when he sees his mom give Ronny a kiss on the hand?

- Mystery At Blackbeard's Cove (2004)

An adventure story about four kids who gets chased into a tunnel by a scoundrel.

- A Kiss Goodbye (2007)

This book is a continuation of the Kissing Hand books. Chester is devastated by the fact he has to move out of his den. The tree cutters have his den in sight to cut down. How will Chester cope leaving his good friends behind?

- Blackbeard And The Sandstone Pillar Part I: When Lightning Strikes (2007)

A chapter book about kids searching the globe for loot, which leads them to discover a sandstone in a secret island.

- Blackbeard And The Sandstone Pillar Part 2:The Gift of Silence (2007)

A continued tale about kids returning the pirate loot, and discovering that the sandstone they found has secret powers.

- Chester Raccoon and the Big Bad Bully (2008)
- The Miracle Jar: a Hanukkah Story (2008)
- Chester Raccoon and the Acorn Full of Memories (2009)
- A Bedtime Kiss for Chester Raccoon (2010)

== Upcoming books ==
- Blackbeard's Legacy: Shared/Time
- Chester the Brave
