= Single White Female (film series) =

American thriller film series

- Created by: Don Roos
- Original work: Single White Female (1992)
- Owner: Sony Pictures Entertainment
- Years: 1992–present
- Based on: SWF Seeks Same by John Lutz

Films and television
- Film(s): Single White Female (1992); Single Female (TBA)
- Direct-to-video: Single White Female 2: The Psycho (2005)

Theatrical presentations
- Play(s): Single White Female (2026)

Single White Female is an American psychological thriller film series created by Don Roos, based on the 1990 novel SWF Seeks Same by John Lutz. The series was distributed by Sony Pictures Entertainment, and consisting of two films and a stage adaptation. The first installment was written by Roos, and produced and directed by Barbet Schroeder, released in 1992.

== Films ==
Film	U.S. release date	Director(s)	Screenwriter(s)	Producer(s)
Single White Female	August 14, 1992	Barbet Schroeder	Don Roos	Barbet Schroeder
Single White Female 2: The Psycho	October 25, 2005	Keith Samples	Glenn Hobart, Andy Hurst & Ross Helford	Marc Bienstock
Single Female	TBA	TBA	Sarah DeLappe	Jenna Ortega, Taylor Russell, Stacey Sher, Marisa Paiva & Elizabeth Gabler

=== Single White Female (1992) ===
A woman advertising for a new roommate finds that something very strange is going on with the tenant who decides to move in.

=== Single White Female 2: The Psycho (2005) ===
A young woman develops a dangerous, obsessive friendship with her new roommate and plots to murder all those who she feels have done her new friend wrong.

=== Future ===
In March 2025, it was reported that a remake of the 1992 film is being produced by Sony Pictures and 3000 Pictures. Jenna Ortega and Taylor Russell were set to star and produced the remake. The following year, Sarah DeLappe is set to write and was produced by Stacey Sher and Marisa Paiva, with the film is now titled as Single Female.

=== Television ===
In December 2016, NBC is developing a television adaptation of the film. As of March 2026, no further announcements has been made.

=== Stage adaptation ===
A stage adaptation based on the film adapted by Rebecca Reid and directed by Gordon Greenberg. It was staged at Theatre Royal, Brighton in the United Kingdom in 2026. Starring Lisa Faulkner and Kym Marsh as Allie and Hedy respectively.

== Derivative works ==
The first film was followed by a slew of imitators and unofficial remakes Apartment (2010) in India and The Roommate (2011). The Roommate film was using similarities and inspired by Single White Female. Other derivatives include the Lifetime television film series Single Black Female (2022), which was also inspired by the film and its own sequels Single Black Female 2: Simone's Revenge (2024) and Single Black Female 3: The Final Chapter (2025).

== Cast and crew ==
=== Principal cast ===
List indicators

This section includes characters who will appear or have appeared in the franchise.

- An empty grey cell indicates the character was not in the film, or that the character's official presence has not yet been confirmed.
- ^{Y} indicates a younger version of the character.

Characters	Films		Stage
Characters	Single White Female	Single White Female 2: The Psycho	Single White Female
Characters	1992	2005	2026
Allison "Allie" Jones	Bridget Fonda		Lisa Faulkner
Hedra "Hedy" Carlson Ellen Besch	Jennifer Jason Leigh Tiffany Mataras^{Y}		Kym Marsh
Sam Rawson	Steven Weber		Jonathan McGarrity
Mitch Meyerson	Stephen Tobolowsky		
Judy Besch	Krystle Mataras		
Holly Parker		Kristen Miller Courtney Taylor Burness^{Y}	
Tess Kositch		Allison Lange	
Jan Lambert		Brooke Burns	
David Kray		Todd Babcock	
Dectective Rousch		Rif Hutton	
Bella			Amy Snudden

=== Additional production and crew details ===
Film	Crew/detail					
Film	Composer	Cinematographer	Editor	Production companies	Distribution companies	Running time
Single White Female	Howard Shore	Luciano Tovoli	Lee Percy	Columbia Pictures	Columbia Pictures	108 minutes
Single White Female 2: The Psycho	Steven Stern	Thomas M. Harting	Peter Devaney Flanagan	Destination Films Third Street Pictures	Sony Pictures Home Entertainment	91 minutes

== Reception ==
=== Box office performance ===
Film	U.S. release date	Box office gross			Budget	Ref(s)
Film	U.S. release date	U.S. and Canada	Other territories	Worldwide	Budget	Ref(s)
Single White Female	August 14, 1992	$48,017,402	$36,000,000	$84,017,402	$16 million	
Total		$48,017,402	$36,000,000	$84,017,402	$16,000,000	

=== Critical and public response ===
Film	Rotten Tomatoes	Metacritic	CinemaScore
Single White Female	53% (49 reviews)	63 (25 reviews)	B−
Single White Female 2: The Psycho	– (2 reviews)	—N/a	—N/a
