= List of USA High episodes =

USA High is an American teen sitcom that aired on USA Network. The series follows a group of students at the American School, a boarding school for American and international students in Paris, France, after the addition of new student Jackson Green (Josh Holland). Season 1 consisted of 75 episodes that premiered on August 4, 1997, and aired through November 13, 1998. Season 2 consisted of 20 episodes that premiered on November 16, 1998 and aired through June 10, 1999. Peter Engel was the executive producer of USA High, with co-executive producers Leslie Eberhard and Steve Slavkin (who was co-executive producer for the series' first 25 episodes only).

== Series overview ==
Season	Episodes	Originally released	
Season	Episodes	First released	Last released
1	75	August 4, 1997	November 13, 1998
2	20	November 16, 1998	June 10, 1999

== Episodes ==
=== Season 1 (1997–98) ===
Season 1 of USA High premiered on August 4, 1997 at 9:30 am. The series was run twice daily, Monday through Friday, airing at 9:30 am and 5:30 pm, between August 5 and September 12, 1997; the air dates listed for episodes 1–24 are based on the 9:30 am timeslot airings. From September 15, 1997, USA High only aired at 5:30 pm, except for two Sunday 10:30 am airings.

List of USA High season 1 episodes
No. overall	No. in season	Title	Directed by	Written by	Original release date	Prod. code
1	1	"An American in Paris"	Gary Shimokawa	Leslie Eberhard	August 4, 1997	07601
Old friends Lauren Fontaine, Winnie Barnes and Bobby Lazzarini (all Americans) are reunited with Christian Mueller (German) and Ashley Elliot (English) as a new school year begins for them at the American School in Paris, France. All of the students are away from their parents except Ashley, whose father is headmaster at the school. They all live together in a suite for six, with the girls' room on one side, the boys' on the other and a large common room in between. This year there is a new roommate, Jackson Green, another American. At first Jackson does not fit in .
2	2	"The Car"	Gary Shimokawa	Ken Kuta	August 5, 1997	07602
Mr. Elliot is entered in a road race which will pit him against Ms. Dupre, a beautiful young Frenchwoman who teaches at the Academy and is the secret heartthrob of the headmaster, who is a single parent. Lauren, who admires Mr. Elliot's Aston Martin, agrees to go out with Jackson if he can get use of the car, which he does without Mr. Elliot's knowledge. However, when Jackson lets Lauren take a spin behind the wheel, she drives it into the Seine. Jackson needs to come up with money for repairs, so he plans to throw a rave to raise the cash.
3	3	"The Credit Card"	Gary Shimokawa	Leslie Eberhard	August 6, 1997	07603
Mr. Eliot is on a cleanliness kick, demanding all of the students clean up their rooms. Winnie's father, meanwhile, sends her a credit card. The shopaholic Winnie quickly runs up a huge bill, so Jackson comes up with a solution to help her pay it off: start a cleaning service for hire to other students. But when the boys clean Ms. Dupre's apartment, they come upon her next French test, complete with the answers.
4	4	"The Ex-Boyfriend"	Frank Bonner	Paul Dell & Steve Weiss	August 7, 1997	07604
Paul, Lauren's boyfriend from the previous school year, arrives back in the city of Paris and sparks begin to once again fly between the two. This inspires a fit of jealousy in Jackson and he starts spying on the couple. Also, Winnie meets Prince Nicholas of Lichtenberg, who is enamored of her and asks her on a date. However, before she goes, Ashley, Mr. Elliot and Ms. Dupre give Winnie lessons on the proper way to act around royalty.
5	5	"Truth or Dare"	Gary Shimokawa	Steve Slavkin	August 8, 1997	07605
Winnie is down because her boyfriend Giuseppe will not be in Paris for her birthday, so the gang tries to cheer her up by playing a favorite game of hers, "Truth or Dare." Lazz is the only one who chooses "truth"--he reveals he uses "ladies' deodorant!" The others all take Winnie up on her dares: Christian must hang the school banner from the Eiffel Tower, Ashley must anger her father Mr. Elliot, and Jackson and Lauren must kiss. Meanwhile, Mr. Elliot is thrilled at the prospect of a romantic dinner date with Ms. Dupre, but he has difficulty getting a reservation at the Eiffel Tower.
6	6	"Double Your Pleasure"	Gary Shimokawa	Bernie Ancheta	August 11, 1997	07606
The school's Carnival Costume Ball is coming up and Jackson's dad has set him up with a blind date. Surprisingly, though, Jackson actually wants to go out with this girl. But Lauren has already decided on costumes that she and Jackson will wear when they go together. Jackson attempts to juggle both girls and costumes at the dance, with predictable results. Meanwhile, Christian's affection for Winnie is growing, as he asks her to go to the Ball with him in Princess Diana's wedding dress.
7	7	"The Headmaster's Daughter"	Frank Bonner	Ken Kuta	August 12, 1997	07607
Mr. Elliot is making Ashley's love life difficult by scaring off all of her potential dates, until Chad comes along and she finally gets to go out. But then she finds out her father the headmaster paid Chad (or Bernie which is his real name) to take her out. To get back at him, Ashley pretends to be going out with Lazzarini, which drives Mr. Elliot crazy. Also, Christian blew $400 that was supposed to go toward a ski trip on ski clothes for himself. To replace the funds, he and Jackson enter a contest sponsored by Ms. Dupre in which the winner will cater a faculty dinner.
8	8	"For Whom the Bell Tolls"	Frank Bonner	Paul Corrigan & Brad Walsh	August 13, 1997	07608
The guys can't get any phone time with the girls always being on the suite's one line. Rather than pay for another phone, the boys try to wire up their own line. It turns out that they rigged up a duplicate line so they can eavesdrop on the girls' private conversations. Jackson uses this inside knowledge to his advantage with Lauren. Also, Winnie and Ashley try to relocate the "hunky" pizza delivery guy they saw before and Mr. Elliot and Ms. Dupre work together on a fundraiser.
9	9	"Internet Love Story"	Frank Bonner	Bernie Ancheta	August 14, 1997	07609
Lazz is chatting in an online romance with a girl named Melanie. She sends her picture and Lazz is shocked to see that she's gorgeous. Nervous about her beauty, he sends her a picture of Jackson. When Melanie makes a surprise visit, it sparks confusion so the gang helps Lazz impress her. Melanie falls in love with Lazz who is still pretending to be Jackson. Lazz tells Melanie the truth. She is furious with him for lying and storms off. Lazz writes her an apology but is too nervous to send it, so Jackson sends it for him.
10	10	"Making the Grade"	Frank Bonner	Leslie Eberhard	August 15, 1997	07610
Christian is in danger of failing Ms. Dupre's history class. He must get at least a "B" on his next test or he'll be kicked off the basketball team. The guys convince Winnie to tutor Christian and to her great surprise, she finds that she's attracted to him. Also, Lazz does such a good job of cutting Ashley's hair that he and Jackson start their own hair-styling business. But unfortunately their business starts to go sour after they accidentally turn Lauren's hair green.
11	11	"The Model"	Frank Bonner	Paul Dell & Steve Weiss	August 18, 1997	07611
Through Jackson, Lauren gets a modeling job with renowned fashion photographer Derek Donovan. But Jackson may have cause to regret it when Lauren appears to be on the verge of a career as a model which will take her away from the Academy. Meanwhile, Winnie and Ashley try selling "Broadway Girl" cosmetics. At first they can't sell a thing, then they recruit Christian as a salesman. Suddenly, women all over Paris just can't get enough of their product.
12	12	"Jackson's Dad"	Gary Shimokawa	Bernie Ancheta	August 19, 1997	07612
Jackson's father, a successful businessman, comes to visit at the school and he's not happy when his son tells him he plans to pursue a musical career. His dad threatens to pull Jackson out of the Academy if he doesn't give up the idea. The other roommates hold a yard sale. They sell an old painting to the school librarian Mr. Macafee and then find out it might be a valuable family heirloom of Mr. Elliot's.
13	13	"The Most Valuable Waiter"	Gary Shimokawa	Steve Slavkin	August 20, 1997	07613
Lauren's work schedule at the USA Cafe, where she works part-time as a waitress, is cutting into Jackson's time with her, so he gets a job there himself as a waiter. Mr. Elliot also looks to spend more time with Ms. Dupre after joining her book club, but he's taking shortcuts by watching movie versions of the books he's supposed to read. The other suitemates are all nervous wrecks after viewing a horror film.
14	14	"The Recital"	Gary Shimokawa	Steve Slavkin	August 25, 1997	07614
Lauren has an important piano recital coming up, one that could possibly get her into a prestigious music conservatory. Jackson, once again scheming to get close to Lauren, arranges a date between Ashley and Lauren's page turner, hoping to snare the job himself. Meanwhile, Mr. Elliot's deluxe model vibrating chair is mistakenly delivered to the students' flat. They love its effect so much that they hide it from Mr. Elliot.
15	15	"Giuseppe's Coming to Dinner"	Gary Shimokawa	Leslie Eberhard	August 26, 1997	07615
Winnie's long-absent boyfriend Giuseppe has come back to town. But the trouble is, Winnie has neglected to tell him about her new boyfriend Christian. She tries to keep the ex- and current boyfriends in the dark about each other, a plan that's doomed to fail. Also, Lazz and Jackson set up a satellite dish which Mr. Elliot is adamant about having removed--that is, until Ms. Dupre expresses interest in seeing a particular program.
16	16	"Radio Free Advice"	Gary Shimokawa	Paul Corrigan & Brad Walsh	August 27, 1997	07616
Lazzarini discovers the school's old abandoned radio station and soon he and Jackson have it in operation once again. Their most popular effort is an advice show, "Doctor Romance," whose unwitting listeners include Mr. Elliot. Also, Winnie makes an effort to rein in something that comes natural to her--insults directed at Christian.
17	17	"All That Lazz"	Gary Shimokawa	Ken Kuta	August 28, 1997	07617
Lazzarini is not happy when his career aptitude test shows him to be cut out for an elevator operator's job. But he perks up when an agent thinks he has comedic talent and books him into a comedy club on amateur night. The rest of the gang is not so sure about Lazz's act, though, and he doesn't take kindly to their constructive criticisms. Meanwhile, Ashley kidnaps the chimpanzee from the school's lab with an eye towards liberating him.
18	18	"West Point"	Gary Shimokawa	Noah Taft	August 29, 1997	07618
Jackson has a date with Lauren. Unfortunately, it's for the opera. Lauren has an old friend, Wallace "the Whale" who is in Paris now, so Jackson thinks that by letting Wallace take Lauren to the opera, he can watch the football game that he wants to watch. But Wallace turns out to be a handsome West Point graduate who has lost all the weight that gave him his nickname. Lauren finds herself attracted to him like never before. Also, Christian is going home to Germany for Oktoberfest, but he doesn't have the funds to take Winnie with him.
19	19	"Beauty and the Biker"	Frank Bonner	Carl Kurlander	September 1, 1997	07619
Ashley, who always seems unlucky in love, concocts a fictional boyfriend when she talks to Lauren and Winnie, but she soon finds a real one: a free-spirited biker and artist by the name of Steel. The girls and Mr. Elliot don't approve, but that just drives Ashley closer to him. Meanwhile, the boys suspect that the "Shapely Shoplifter" who's been victimizing Parisian based jewelry stores is in fact Ms. Dupre.
20	20	"A Date with Dupre"	Gary Shimokawa	Leslie Eberhard	September 3, 1997	07620
Bobby Lazzarini has been dumped by yet another girlfriend, and his teacher Ms. Dupre offers him her sympathies. However, Lazz misinterprets the actions of Ms. Dupre, who is his real heartthrob, and concludes that she's in love with him. Also, Jackson has an important audition before an agent, and he recruits Ashley and Winnie as back-up singers. Unfortunately, Lauren wants to make it a trio. Her terrible singing threatens Jackson's chances for success, but no one knows how to tell her the awful truth without seriously hurting her feelings.
21	21	"The German Girl"	Gary Shimokawa	Leslie Eberhard	September 5, 1997	07621
Ursula, a new female student from Germany, arrives at the Academy and asks Christian to show her around. This arouses Winnie's jealousy, and for good reason: Ursula has designs on Christian. Also, a thief has broken into the dorm and Lazzarini has devised a security system to catch him.
22	22	"The Odd Couple"	Frank Bonner	Paul Dell & Steve Weiss	September 8, 1997	07622
In Ms. Dupre's drama class, Jackson and Ashley have to kiss for a scene. While practicing the exercise, they find they really enjoy it. But the two soon realize that even though they have a great physical attraction for each other, they may not be right for a more serious relationship. Meanwhile, Christian doesn't want to go to the dentist for his painful toothache, and after he's sent to "Dr. Giggles," it looks like his apprehension may have been justified.
23	23	"The Dueling Elliots"	Gary Shimokawa	Paul Corrigan & Brad Walsh	September 9, 1997	07623
Headmaster Patrick Elliot's brother Nigel arrives upon the scene, prompting a renewal of their sibling rivalry. Mr. Elliot promised the gang to get them "Lollapalooza" tickets, and when he doesn't deliver, Nigel claims he can obtain them. Also, Lauren joins the fencing team and wounds Jackson's ego by defeating him. He quickly demands a rematch.
24	24	"Love is Blind"	Gary Shimokawa	Noah Taft	September 10, 1997	07624
Jackson meets Katherine Hanley, a pretty girl who he doesn't realize at first is blind. They hit it off and start to date. But Jackson gets scared when his feelings for Katherine grow very strong, and he backs away from her, leaving Katherine to wonder if it's her blindness that is driving him away. Also, the "Girl's Choice" dance is at hand, causing all sorts of commotion. Winnie thinks Christian is taking her for granted, so she fails to ask him to the dance like he expects. Mr. Elliot is pursued by a secret admirer who he believes (or hopes!) is Ms. Dupre.
25	25	"Au Revoir Katherine"	Frank Bonner	Paul Corrigan & Brad Walsh	September 15, 1997	07625
Jackson gets up the courage to tell Katherine that he loves her, but it looks like he may be too late--she's leaving the Academy and going to Chicago to enter a renowned school there for the blind. Meanwhile, Winnie and Lauren come up with a moneymaking scheme, a calendar featuring the school's hunks. They recruit Christian and Lazz as models, but when the calendar comes out and Christian's on-campus popularity skyrockets, Winnie has a hard time with her jealously and so does Christian.
26	26	"Lazzarini's Sister"	Frank Bonner	Carl Kurlander	September 16, 1997	07627
Lazzarini's younger sister Niki arrives in Paris from New York and her older brother Bobby is happy to see her. The girls try to be friendly by taking her shopping and giving her a makeover which turns the tomboyish girl into quite an attractive young woman. But Bobby can't handle the fact that his sister is not the same little girl he knew before, and when she starts showing a romantic interest in Jackson, Lazz goes ballistic.
27	27	"Nurse Lauren"	Frank Bonner	Paul Dell & Steve Weiss	September 17, 1997	07628
Lauren is to go on a ski trip with Wallace, but before she can leave, Jackson throws his back out trying to lift one of her suitcases. Feeling responsible for his injury, Lauren cancels the trip and stays home in order to tend to Jackson, who takes full advantage of the situation. Also, Christian comes up with an exercise device which the gang hopes to turn into big bucks. To that end, they begin producing their own infomercial.
28	28	"The French Tutor"	Frank Bonner	Paul Corrigan & Brad Walsh	September 18, 1997	07626
Jackson's newest girlfriend is Simone, a French girl who offers to tutor the struggling Lazzarini in her native language. While working together, the two click and they start going out, causing serious problems for Jackson and Lazz's friendship. Meanwhile, Christian is mired in a horrible slump on the basketball court. Ashley believes that Christian's problems all stem from him dating Winnie, so his girlfriend gives up dating him to try and restore his basketball skills.
29	29	"Mr. Tiffani"	Frank Bonner	Paul Dell & Steve Weiss	September 19, 1997	07629
Jackson is reacquainted with his childhood friend Tiffani Gleason, who is now a famous TV star. The two of them begin going out, but Jackson finds it difficult to deal with the world of being a celebrity that Tiffani now inhabits. Starstruck Lazzarini, for his part, finds it difficult to even speak a coherent sentence when Tiffani is around. The three girls, meanwhile, battle each other for the title of Fall Ball Queen, and the results aren't pretty.
30	30	"Bed & Breakfast"	Frank Bonner	Bernie Ancheta	September 21, 1997	07630
With Mr. Elliot and Ms. Dupre out of town, the gang comes up with a moneymaking scheme: turning the dorm into a bed and breakfast inn. Their first guests are a load of tourists from Texas. Also, Lauren looks for a way to break off her relationship with Wallace. Note: Aired on Sunday at 10:30 am.
31	31	"Baby Boom"	Gary Shimokawa	Paul Dell & Steve Weiss	September 22, 1997	07631
Jackson almost has a date lined up with Lauren for a music awards show, but she has a conflicting baby-sitting job for one of the teachers. Jackson then volunteers to help Lauren, thinking it will improve his image with her. Meanwhile, Winnie, Ashley, Christian and director Lazz make a promotional video for themselves. However, in their zeal to win a $5000 grant, they exaggerate their accomplishments and abilities.
32	32	"Camping with Mr. Elliot"	Gary Shimokawa	Paul Corrigan & Brad Walsh	September 23, 1997	07632
Mr. Elliot once again wants to take his daughter Ashley camping, which is an activity she hates. The girls see this as an opportunity to get a much-needed break from the boys, so they maneuver them into going camping with the headmaster instead. The trip is a disaster for the men, topped off by a visit from a bear. Back at the dorm, the girls' night together doesn't go so well either, as their talk about boys leads to some uncomfortable revelations.
33	33	"Once Upon an Elevator"	Gary Shimokawa	Noah Taft	September 24, 1997	07633
Jackson, on his way to an audition, and Lauren get stuck in a broken elevator. They spend their time talking about this and that and surprise themselves by sharing a kiss. Later, Lauren wants to write off the romantic interlude as a mistake, but then she regrets rejecting Jackson once again. Meanwhile, Winnie and Christian along with Ashley and Lazz pose as newlywed couples to get on the popular game show "Just Married." Also, Mr. Elliot's addiction to a soap opera is getting the better of him.
34	34	"Headmaster Winnie"	Gary Shimokawa	Bernie Ancheta	September 25, 1997	07634
Mr. Elliot decides to teach his headstrong student Winnie a lesson in his ethics class by making her the school's headmaster for a week. At first, she treats the job like a lark, but then she begins to take the situation more seriously and soon she has conflicts between her duties and her friendship with her roommates. After Mr. Elliot cancels a ski trip, the rest of the gang wants to hold a "Vegas Night" event in their suite, as this is something headmaster Winnie must approve. Meanwhile, Mr. Elliot uses his free time to try to make time with Ms. Dupre.
35	35	"Gotta Dance"	Gary Shimokawa	Paul Dell & Steve Weiss	September 28, 1997	07635
Jealous of Winnie's dance partner, Christian joins the modern dance class she and Ashley attend with the intention of becoming Winnie's partner in a recital that Ashley is choreographing. The problem is that Christian has two left feet. Lauren, Jackson and Lazz are put to work in Mr. Elliot's office, where they access their records and soon start a lucrative business changing other students' grades. Note: Aired on Sunday at 10:30 am.
36	36	"The Competition"	Gary Shimokawa	Carl Kurlander	September 29, 1997	07636
Jackson competes against a pretty singer named Alyssa on Amateur Night at the USA Cafe. She wins the competition, but she likes Jackson's style enough that she suggests he play the winner's gig with her. All the long hours that Alyssa and Jackson spend rehearsing makes Lauren jealous, however. Elsewhere, Bobby's culinary talents lead him to open up "Lazzarini's Pizza House," but Christian finds that as an employer, Lazz leaves a lot to be desired.
37	37	"King Mueller"	Gary Shimokawa	Paul Corrigan & Brad Walsh	September 30, 1997	07637
Christian finds out he has some royal blood in his background: in fact, he's the heir to the throne of the tiny nation of Himmelberg. At first he takes to his new regal status well, but then his manservant Fritz informs him that by law he cannot date a "commoner" like Winnie. Also, Lauren and Jackson struggle to find some time alone while Lazz protests Mr Elliot's plan to sell an historic park bench at the school.
38	38	"The Winnie Show"	Gary Shimokawa	Jonathan Green & Gabe Miller	October 1, 1997	07638
Winnie hosts her own TV show on a public access channel, and to ensure she gets lots of viewers, she turns to a "tabloid" format of gossip and scandal-mongering. When she shines the spotlight on her roommates' private lives, though, the heat she gets from them proves to be more than she can handle. Also, Lazz and Christian try to hypnotize Mr. Elliot. Their efforts don't work on him, but what no one realizes at first is that the boys accidentally succeeded in hypnotizing Ms. Dupre.
39	39	"Goodbye, Mr. Phipps"	Gary Shimokawa	Noah Taft	October 2, 1997	07639
Everyone is shocked by the sudden death of heir beloved teacher Mr. Phipps right in the middle of his 70th birthday party. His death affects the gang in different ways. Jackson and Lauren decide that they are too young to be tied to each other and agree to start dating other people. Christian and Winnie, on the other hand, get more serious about their relationship. The carnivorous Lazzarini vows to give up meat, while Ashley develops an extreme phobia about germs.
40	40	"Giuseppe Returns"	Gary Shimokawa	Bernie Ancheta	October 30, 1997	07640
Winnie's former boyfriend Giuseppe is back in Paris again, and she's convinced he's come to try to win her back. However, Giuseppe has had a secret relationship with Ashley that's now out in the open. Winnie can't believe it at first, but those feelings soon turn to jealousy and threaten her friendship with Ashley. Lazz and Jackson compete with Lauren on projects for a science fair.
41	41	"Happy New Year"	Gary Shimokawa	Jonathan Green & Gabe Miller	December 31, 1997	07641
New Year's Eve approaches and nobody's plans are working out smoothly, including those of the party planners themselves Ms. Dupre and Mr. Elliot. Christian is returning to Germany for the holidays, much to Winnie's distress, but he tries to arrange an escort for her to the party. Jackson cancels his plans to go with Lauren after failing a midterm exam. Meanwhile, after Lazz's actions have possibly saved Ashley's life, she tries to repay him with slave-like devotion, but he pushes his good fortune too far.
42	42	"Buddies"	Gary Shimokawa	Robert Tarlow	January 2, 1998	07642
Lazz and Christian get jobs at a record store, whereas the company's attractive manager Tina starts making moves on Lazz. Christian soon finds out, though, that Tina's intended target is really he himself. When he tries to tell his friend this, Lazz thinks Christian is just jealous of his good fortune and the boys' friendship is on the rocks. Meanwhile, an overheard conversation and other mounting evidence lead the other four roommates to conclude that their teacher Mr. Nash is planning to murder his wife.
43	43	"Lottery Fever"	Gary Shimokawa	Bernie Ancheta	January 5, 1998	07643
The girls and Jackson combine their birth dates to come up with numbers for a lottery ticket. When those numbers turn out to be the winners, they immediately start spending the money they don't yet have. But then Ashley, not surprisingly, loses the ticket, prompting a frenzy. At the record store Stan informs Christian and Lazz that he can only keep one of them with the company, and that he will make that decision based on their performance next week. This results in a cutthroat competition between the friends.
44	44	"Date Auction"	Gary Shimokawa	Leslie Eberhard	January 6, 1998	07644
45	45	"Lazz's High Noon"	Gary Shimokawa	Rob Hammersley	January 7, 1998	07645
Winnie convinces the boys to make themselves available for the Academy's date auction she's helping to organize. Lazz is none too thrilled when he is bid on and won by an overweight girl named Natalie. But after going out with her, he's surprised to find that he really enjoys her company. But to Lazz's dismay, Natalie puts an end to the relationship. Winnie doesn't like it when her rival Denise outbids her for a date with Christian. Jackson expects the best when Lauren picks him, and so does Ashley when she wins a date with hunky Tom, but the dates don't turn out as planned.
46	46	"Daddy's Little Girl"	Gary Shimokawa	Robert Tarlow	January 8, 1998	07646
Winnie's father comes to Paris for a visit. Winnie is concerned since her dad never approves of her boyfriends, and the story is no different with Christian. As soon as her father gets a moment alone with Christian, he tells him he's not good enough for his daughter and demands that he break up with her. Elsewhere, Lazz and Jackson think they've found some easy marks when they makes some bets on basketball with Ashley and Lauren. Mr. Elliot, ignoring Shakespeare's advice, loans Ms. Dupre $3000.
47	47	"Breaking Up Is Hard to Do"	Don Barnhart	Noah Taft	January 9, 1998	07647
Lauren is going out of town, but she encourages Jackson to go to an upcoming dance without her. While there, he meets Megan, with whom he has a great time, good enough to make him consider breaking off his steady relationship with Lauren. As a project for ethics class, Ashley sponsors an ex-con, Mack. Mr. Elliot, Christian, Lazz and Winnie all compete to sell the most chocolate bars for charity. The winner will receive a new car as a prize.
48	48	"Culture Shock"	Don Barnhart	Jonathan Green & Gabe Miller	January 12, 1998	07648
Lazz meets a cultured girl named Lydia who frequents the Louvre and he falls for her. Jackson and Christian try to help Lazz appear as cultured as Lydia as he takes her to the opera. Meanwhile Lauren, who can't paint, submits a painting of Ashley's as her own in art class. Mr. Eliot is trying his hand at painting, too. However, he only seems to be able to paint one subject: Ms. Dupre.
49	49	"The Hospital"	Don Barnhart	Paul Dell & Steve Weiss	January 13, 1998	07649
Ashley can't find her beloved antique ring and she thinks that Lazzarini has wolfed it down with the sandwich he was eating. Lazz is taken to the hospital to be examined, and while there Jackson becomes enchanted with a beautiful young nurse, Babette. Lazz becomes convinced he is dying. Ashley volunteers to work at the hospital as a candy striper, but her brand of charity causes some patients more pain than relief. In the meantime, as part of a project for an interior decorating class, Winnie and Lauren submit brash new designs for Mr. Elliot's staid old office.
50	50	"Jackson Moves Out"	Gary Shimokawa	Robert Tarlow	January 14, 1998	07650
The other roommates are perturbed with Jackson for monopolizing the common room with his dates. When heated words are exchanged on the subject, Jackson abruptly decides to move out. However, he soon finds that his old flatmates are much more preferable to his new one. Also, the gang persuade Ms. Dupre and Mr. Elliot to put a personal ad in the paper. They both get dated and a surprise.
51	51	"The U.F.O."	Gary Shimokawa	Rob Hammersley	January 15, 1998	07651
All of a sudden Lazz seems to have psychic powers, as his dreams keep coming true. Winnie is skeptical, however, and plans to disprove his latest dream: that she will be abducted by a UFO while she's atop the Eiffel Tower. Lauren is dating British student Stuart, who gets dropped from the school soccer team after doing badly on Ms. Dupre's chemistry test. Soon Stuart has thrown over Lauren and has started dating Ashley, causing friction between the two girls. But then Lauren figures out Stuart's motives.
52	52	"Jackson's New Manager"	Gary Shimokawa	Bernie Ancheta	January 16, 1998	07652
Lazz convinces Jackson, who is looking for a manager, to let him have a crack at the job. Surprisingly, Lazz actually gets his client some work, but Jackson is dubious about the direction Lazz is leading him in, especially when he has him recording radio jingles.. Christian plans to throw a surprise anniversary party for Winnie, but his furtive behavior causes Winnie to assume the worst. Mr. Elliot buys a rare music box as a gift for his mother, but when Ms. Dupre sees it, she assumes that it is a gift for herself.
53	53	"She's the Boss"	Frank Bonner	Jonathan Green & Gabe Miller	April 6, 1998	07655
At the record store, Stan is looking for a new manager, a job that both Lazz and Christian are eager to have. But when Winnie drops by one day and runs a few ideas for the business past Stan, he offers her the job on the spot. Not surprisingly, Winnie turns out to be a mighty tough boss for the guys to work for. Meanwhile, Ashley, Lauren and Jackson find an expensive diamond necklace at the USA Cafe. Rather than report their finding and look for the owner, they decide to keep the necklace themselves.
54	54	"Lazz versus USA High"	Frank Bonner	Paul Corrigan & Brad Walsh	April 7, 1998	07654
Lazz and the other guys break into Mr. Elliot's office to have a better vantage point from which to play Peeping Tom on Ms. Dupre. While observing her, Lazz falls out the office window and hurts himself. What else can Lazz do but sue the school. Meanwhile, Winnie gets a job in a chic clothing store. Against her better judgment, Lauren prevails upon her to let her borrow a dress for a big evening out.
55	55	"Jackson's Best Bud"	Frank Bonner	Paul Dell & Steve Weiss	April 8, 1998	07653
Cliff, Jackson's best friend from California, comes for a visit. He is immediately attracted to Lauren. At this point, Jackson is fine with his friend's interest in her, but he changes his mind quickly when it appears that Cliff will be going to the Rolling Stones concert in his place. In the meantime, Lazz mistakenly makes a deal with a suspicious character named Guido for a large quantity of merchandise which he and the rest of the gang must sell or face the consequences.
56	56	"Ashley's American Cousin"	Frank Bonner	Paul Dell & Steve Weiss	April 13, 1998	07656
Ashley's cousin Alexis arrives from America for a visit. Lauren and Winnie have a great time taking Alexis out shopping and showing her the city. Soon Ashley's somewhat shy cousin seems like a new girl as she bonds with Lauren and Winnie, leaving Ashley feeling left out. Meanwhile, the boys try to find a world record they can break in order to win a cash prize.
57	57	"Jackson's Dilemma"	Mary Lou Belli	Rob Hammersley	April 14, 1998	07657
A nervous Lazz asks Jackson to ask out his latest heartthrob, Kirstie, for him. But when Jackson tries, Kirstie thinks he is asking for himself, a prospect more to her liking. Jackson can't get Lazz to believe he didn't betray him. Meanwhile, Ashley is beside herself with excitement and anticipation:Queen Elizabeth II is coming to Paris. However, Winnie and Lauren inadvertently cause Ashley to miss the royal appearance. But then the news comes that the Queen will visit the dress shop where Winnie works. Lauren and Winnie arrange to surprise Ashley with a meeting with the Queen
58	58	"Winnie's Brother"	Gary Shimokawa	Paul Dell & Steve Weiss	April 15, 1998	07658
Winnie's brother Anthony pays an unexpected visit, and he has unexpected news: he's dropped out of school to pursue a career in acting. He's yet to tell his parents about this and he refuses to listen to Winnie's advice. Meanwhile, Mr. Elliot has gotten his pilot's license and he takes a group up to fly, including Lazzarini, who has a fear of flying. While in the air, Mr. Elliot gets knocked unconscious.
59	59	"My Hero"	Valentine Mayer	Paul Dell & Steve Weiss	April 17, 1998	07659
When a mugger attempts to rob Winnie and Christian, he is fought off - by Winnie. When the story gets around school, the assumption is that Christian drove the mugger off and rescued Winnie. Christian is afraid to let the truth be known lest his reputation be ruined. But that is exactly what happens. Meanwhile, the other roommates find two parts of a treasure map in their rooms, setting off a wild search for the $5000 booty.
60	60	"Everybody Loves Raphael"	Gary Shimokawa	Noah Taft	April 21, 1998	07660
The Academy gains a celebrity when famous Brazilian soccer star Raphael Banderas, now retired, is hired as a coach. The girls all go gaga for him, and Ms. Dupre is not immune to his charms, either. The boys, meanwhile, hope to steal some of Raphael's personal property to sell to his fans.
61	61	"Raphael's Proposal"	Gary Shimokawa	Robert Tarlow	April 22, 1998	07661
Ms. Dupre has been dating new soccer coach Raphael for some time, a situation much to Mr. Elliot's disliking. Raphael tells Ms. Dupre that he needs to talk to her about a serious matter. The girls overhear enough of the conversation to convince them that Raphael intends to propose to Ms. Dupre. Their attempts to interfere are not appreciated by Ms. Dupre. Also, the boys are all trying out for one open spot on the soccer team, including Lazz, whose chances aren't taken very seriously by Jackson and Christian.
62	62	"Big Lazz on Campus"	Frank Bonner	Jonathan Green & Gabe Miller	June 8, 1998	07662
63	63	"Lauren's Sister"	Gary Shimokawa	Rob Hammersley	June 9, 1998	07663
Lazzarini's mother Lucy is arriving to visit her son at the school, and in order to impress her, he enlists everyone's help to make him appear to be the most popular man on campus. This includes having Winnie pose as his girlfriend Chiquita. Also, Lauren and Jackson make a bet over who can get Ashley the best date for the spring dance. As usual, things don't go as planned.
64	64	"Mother's Day"	Gary Shimokawa	Robert Tarlow	June 10, 1998	07664
Jackson's mother, whom he hasn't seen in thirteen years, arrives in Paris hoping to renew her relationship with her son. But Jackson is not so enthusiastic; he feels like he always came second to her international charity work. Also, Lazz gets ahold of some dubious exercise equipment and he and the rest of the gang break all the rules by turning the common room into a health spa.
65	65	"Goodbye Christian"	Frank Bonner	Paul Corrigan & Brad Walsh	August 3, 1998	07666
Christian gets the news that his parents won't be able to afford his tuition anymore. He tries working at several jobs to raise the money himself, but he gets fired from all of them. Lazz's moneymaking idea is to put on a male dance revue, but the boys are in for a surprise when they hit the stage. Meanwhile, Ms. Dupre puts the girls to work on the school's Crisis Hotline. Winnie and Lauren do a fine job, but Ashley makes a mess out of things. In the end, however, Ashley gets a chance to redeem herself.
66	66	"Jackson's Idol"	Gary Shimokawa	Ron Solomon	August 4, 1998	07667
Jackson's musical idol "Bird Dog" Hamilton is in town, and even though his career is at a low point, Jackson is thrilled. He's even more excited when Bird Dog reacts positively to some songs he plays for him. But soon Bird Dog is passing off Jackson's material as his own. Christian and Lazz compete against the girls for a $500 prize for best futuristic invention in a science fair.
67	67	"A Star Is Born"	Gary Shimokawa	Bernie Ancheta & Troy Searer	August 5, 1998	07668
Jackson is flabbergasted when a producer offers a recording contract to--Ashley? It soon becomes apparent that Ashley's voice is not what interests the producer in her. Also, the guys and the gals square off for a karate challenge match.
68	68	"Christian's Big Lie"	Gary Shimokawa	Bernie Ancheta	August 6, 1998	07669
Christian and Winnie are supposed to go to a jazz festival in Paris, but when Jackson and Lazz get tickets to a championship soccer game in Brussels, Christian tells Winnie he needs to go back to Germany for a family emergency. But he finds it hard to live with the lie he told Winnie. Meanwhile, Ashley's recipe for fat-free cheesecake tastes so good Lauren decides to go into business with her marketing them.
69	69	"The Breakfast Club"	Frank Bonner	Leslie Eberhard	August 7, 1998	07670
The gang is called onto the carpet by Mr. Elliot and Ms. Dupre for their latest misadventure and are put on restriction for a day. While stuck together in one room, they reminisce about some of the crazy goings-on they've been involved in over the past year.
70	70	"From Russia With Love"	Gary Shimokawa	Bernie Ancheta	August 10, 1998	07671
Lazz is expecting an order of brisket to arrive at the dorm, but shipments get mixed up and he is presented with Nadia, a Russian mail-order bride. Lazz is enchanted with Nadia and she asks if he will marry her. He says yes despite the gang's misgivings about his readiness and Nadia's true motives.
71	71	"Fraulein Winnie"	Gary Shimokawa	Jonathan Green & Gabe Miller	August 11, 1998	07665
Winnie is afraid Christian's visiting parents won't approve of her, so Ashley and Lauren try to help her out. Lazz and Jackson try to win a free trip to Hawaii from a charity by dubious means.
72	72	"Kisses, Lies & Videotape"	Gary Shimokawa	Noah Taft	August 12, 1998	07672
Final projects are coming due in Miss Dupre's film class. Ashley chooses her father the headmaster as her subject, while Jackson and Lazz seek out the elusive "Paris cave couple." Winnie wants to do a "reality" style video of people confessing deep secrets. Lauren and Christian collaborate on an exercise video, and during the making of it, they kiss.
73	73	"Jackson's Choice"	Gary Shimokawa	Rob Hammersley	August 13, 1998	07673
74	74	"The Reunion"	Don Barnhart	Leslie Eberhard	August 14, 1998	07674
Jackson's career in music finally seems set to take off; he has a new CD release and the gang are all enthusiastic about doing publicity for him. But Lauren's sister Maggie, with whom he's developed a relationship, is going back to her ship (that's right) to continue her "study at sea" program, and Jackson is seriously considering going with her Note: The copyright date on this episode in 1997, which makes it much older than the other season 1 episodes immediately preceding it.
75	75	"Goodbye Lazz"	Gary Shimokawa	Noah Taft	November 13, 1998	07675
Lazz finally gets up the nerve to tell Ashley something he's kept hidden from her: he's had feelings for her for a long time and thinks he might be in love. Ashley answers that she's had the same feelings for him, also. But the new couple don't have long to enjoy their new relationship. Lazzarini's mother unexpectedly shows up at the school and tells her son that she and his father are leaving the Ice Show they work for and are returning to Brooklyn to manage an ice rink there. Mrs. Lazzarini says the family will need his help. Note: Aired much later than other season 1 episodes, and just days before the season 2 premiere episode.

=== Season 2 (1998–99) ===
USA Network ordered a second season of USA High consisting of 20 episodes which aired between November 1998 and June 1999. James Madio, who played Bobby Lazzarini, did not continue with the series into season 2. William James Jones (formerly of Peter Engel's California Dreams) joined USA High in season 2 playing new American student Dwane "Excess" Wilson.

List of USA High season 2 episodes
No. overall	No. in season	Title	Directed by	Written by	Original release date	Prod. code
76	1	"The Gang, a Guy and a Bakery"	John Bowab	Leslie Eberhard	November 16, 1998	07901
Christian and Jackson gets jobs working in a bakery. One of their customers is particularly obnoxious. Later they find that the new roommate for the departed Lazzarini is Dwayne "Excess" Wilson, the same customer that has given them such a hard time at the bakery. In short order, Excess soon has the girls feeling the same way about him that the guys do. Also, Ashley tries her hand at a new enterprise: dog training.
77	2	"Jackson's Assistant"	John Bowab	Robert Tarlow	November 17, 1998	07902
Jackson and Christian are given the responsibility of hiring a much-need assistant for the bakery. After interviewing several oddball applicants, Jackson hires Alicia for the job. But soon Jackson starts up a romantic relationship with the pretty new assistant, leaving Christian to do all the work. Meanwhile, Excess goes into the business of entertaining at children's parties, a gig that proves so lucrative that the girls join up
78	3	"The Gang Gets A Car"	John Bowab	Troy Searer	November 18, 1998	07903
Life would be a lot easier for the gang with a car, they all believe, and Excess suggests they all pool their money and buy one together. They aren't happy, however, when they see the wreck that their new roommate buys for them. Excess, still trying to prove himself to the rest of the gang, is hurt that they don't trust his judgment, and indeed, everyone starts to change their minds after Excess spends hours fixing the car up and making it very presentable. But then they take it for a spin with Ashley at the wheel and have an accident.
79	4	"I Want My MTV!"	Jeff Meyer	Rob Hammersley	November 19, 1998	07904
Excess applies for a "VJ" job, and to his great delight, he gets it. But the fame and attention the new job brings goes straight to his head. Meanwhile, the prophecies in fortune cookies all seem to be coming true for the gang, except for Ashley, who hasn't yet met anyone famous as her fortune predicted.
80	5	"Excess's Ex"	Mary Lou Belli	Bernie Ancheta	November 20, 1998	07905
Liza, Excess' former girlfriend, comes to Paris. Though Excess is still hopeful of getting back together with her, she plans to tell him the relationship is over for good. Before Liza can do that, she meets Jackson and kisses him. When Excess finds this out, it causes a great strain between him and Jackson. Meanwhile the other four roommates pile into the car for a road trip. A tire goes flat in the remote French countryside. They go looking for aid at a farmhouse, which is occupied by a very weird (and scary) woman and her son, who want Winnie for the son's bride.
81	6	"Winnie Wear"	Mary Lou Belli	Troy Searer	December 28, 1998	07906
At the dress shop where she works part-time, Winnie tells visiting designer Claude Perrier what she really thinks of his new designs--and it's none too complimentary. The store's owner Fifi fires her immediately, but M. Perrier decides he likes and agrees with Winnie's honest criticisms and gives her a job as a designer herself. Immediately Winnie believes that she's "all that" now, but her career as a designer is not destined to last very long. Also, while playing around on the roof with the others, Ashley accidentally knocks a bottle off the ledge.
82	7	"Jackson The Brain"	Mary Lou Belli	Bill Marich & Rich Ross	December 28, 1998	07907
Lauren, who excels in science, helps Jackson study for an important exam on the subject. Amazingly, Jackson scores higher than Lauren or anyone else on the exam. This qualifies him to be the American School's entrant in the science tournament, the same tournament Lauren had her heart set on competing in. Also, for the other four roommates, bowling turns from a fun form of recreation to cutthroat competition.
83	8	"For the Love of Ashley"	Mary Lou Belli	Mark Scherzer	December 29, 1998	07908
Excess works with Ashley on a pottery class project and becomes more and more attracted to her. The other girls can see this and they tell Ashley about it. Ashley doesn't believe them until Excess kisses her. She doesn't share his feelings, though, but is afraid to hurt Excess by telling him she'd just like to remain friends. Meanwhile, the others plot to stage an entry for the "Paris' Funniest Home Videos" TV show, but they accidentally submit a tape of Mr. Elliot singing in the shower.
84	9	"Cinder-Ashley"	Mary Lou Belli	Rob Hammersley	December 29, 1998	07909
Ashley hopes that Tom Prince will ask her to the big dance, but alas, he doesn't. On the night of the dance, she falls asleep and dreams that she is "Cinder-Ashley," who lives with her wicked and cruel stepsisters Winnistasia and Laurzella. Will her Prince come to her rescue?
85	10	"Hands Off My Christian"	Mary Lou Belli	Mark Scherzer	December 30, 1998	07910
Winnie is showing a new freshman named Renee around the campus. Christian is really put on the spot when Renee stars flirting heavily with him. Also, new competition for the USA Cafe appears in the form of Pete's American Diner.
86	11	"The Blind Date"	Mary Lou Belli	Troy Searer	December 30, 1998	07911
Excess' dad, a member of the diplomatic corps, sets up his son on a blind date with a colleague's daughter named Tyra. Desperate to get out of it, Excess enlists the help of the other guys in faking an excuse. But he immediately regrets his actions the first time he lays eyes on Tyra. Meanwhile, Ashley's novel, based on life at the Academy, is being serialized in the school paper. It's a big hit with everyone until a later chapter contains some uncomplimentary portraits of Lauren and Winnie, along with Ms. Dupre and Mr. Elliot.
87	12	"Hey Big Spender"	Mary Lou Belli	Mark Scherzer	December 31, 1998	07912
Lauren is dating a rich guy named Darren. Excess and Jackson tell her she's only dating him for the material things he can give her. But the guys start getting some of the benefits of Darren's free ways with his money, and when Lauren is ready to break up with him, they try to talk her out of it. Mr. Elliot gets sick at a most inopportune time - right when he's supposed to take out Ms. Dupre on their first real date. Christian forgets Winnie's birthday and Ashley tries to help him find a last-minute gift.
88	13	"Lights, Camera, Jackson"	Mary Lou Belli	Mark Scherzer	December 31, 1998	07913
Jackson is encouraged by the talent scout for a TV variety show to submit a video of himself performing. Excess lines up director Joey Avalon to shoot a video for Jackson, but the unprofessional antics of Jackson's co-starring roommates disgust the director and he stalks off leaving the job undone. Meanwhile, Lauren finds out the identity of her secret admirer: a guy named Larry. She likes him and starts dating him, but has a hard time with the fact that he is much shorter than her.
89	14	"Christian's Scholarship"	Mary Lou Belli	Leslie Eberhard	March 29, 1999	07914
Christian is offered a full athletic scholarship to UCLA to play basketball. But Winnie is saddened by the thought of her boyfriend attending a school many thousands of miles away from her. Is it too much to ask Christian to give up this opportunity? Meanwhile, the rest of the gang is picked as a subject for the "Real Life" documentary series, but the producer soon finds them too boring and sets out to spice up the story.
90	15	"It's a Wonderful Life"	Mary Lou Belli	Rob Hammersley	March 30, 1999	07920
Jackson is filing out his application to the Juilliard School of Music when he is stuck for an answer to an essay question about his greatest high school achievement. The gang tries to help him by reminiscing about some of their exploits over the past year.
91	16	"Good Sports"	Mary Lou Belli	Troy Searer	March 30, 1999	07916
The girls have been skipping out on Mr. Macafee's gym class and are trying to make it up as the school year draws near an end. Macafee uses the "honor system" for grading, and the girls foolishly give themselves high marks. This leads to their instructor entering them in a big gymnastics competition against a school rival. Meanwhile, Mr. Elliot is finally ready to ask Ms. Dupre to marry him, but his attempts at proposing to her are constantly interrupted.
92	17	"Psych 101"	Mary Lou Belli	Bill Marich & Rich Ross	June 7, 1999	07919
Jackson tries to raise money by selling sweat shirts and sweat pants, but customers get angry when the sweats shrink in the wash.
93	18	"The Wedding"	Mary Lou Belli	Bill Marich & Rich Ross	June 8, 1999	07915
The day that many thought would never arrive is getting closer: Ms. Dupre and Mr. Elliot are getting married. The rest of the gang is excitedly making preparations but Ashley finds that she doesn't want her father to marry again and determines she must stop the wedding. Meanwhile, Mr. Elliot isn't doing his own wedding plans any good when he disappears from his bachelor party with a couple of hula girls in tow.
94	19	"The Last Hurrah"	Mary Lou Belli	Bernie Ancheta	June 9, 1999	07917
The gang wants to have one big final blowout of a party to commemorate the end of their senior year. To do this, they must convince the newlywed Mr. and Mrs. Elliot to go on their honeymoon before graduation. Excess is so worried about his upcoming interview with Mr. Smithee of Yale University that he is driving everyone else to distraction. To take him down a few notches, Winnie gets an actor acquaintance to fool Excess into thinking he's Smithee.
95	20	"Graduation Day"	Mary Lou Belli	Leslie Eberhard	June 10, 1999	07918
Graduation time has almost arrived and the friends are reacting with different emotions ranging from excitement to regret. All that stands between them and their college careers is Mr. Rydbeck's history final. Jackson once again is drawn to Lauren, giving her a kiss and telling her that he loves her. However, a bombshell is then dropped on the students: no one passed the history test so no one will graduate.
