= USA High =

American sitcom

- Genre: Teen comedy
- Created by: Leslie Eberhard; Peter Engel
- Written by: Bernie Ancheta; Paul Corrigan; Paul Dell; Leslie Eberhard; Ken Kuta; Steve Slavkin; Noah Taft; Brad Walsh
- Directed by: Mary Lou Belli; Frank Bonner; Gary Shimokawa
- Starring: Josh Holland; Elena Lyons; Thomas Magiar; Marquita Terry; James Madio; Kristen Miller; Angela Visser; Nicholas Guest; William James Jones
- Theme music composer: Eva King
- Opening theme: "Rockin' At USA High"
- Composer: Eva King
- Country of origin: United States
- Original language: English
- No. of seasons: 2
- No. of episodes: 95 (list of episodes)

Production
- Executive producer: Peter Engel
- Producers: Bernie Ancheta; Peter Engel; Sue Feyk; Rob Hammersley; Carl Kurlander; Ken Kuta; Robert Tarlow
- Editor: Robert Bramwell: Terry M. Pickford
- Camera setup: Multi-camera
- Running time: 22–24 minutes
- Production companies: Peter Engel Productions; Rysher Entertainment; NBC Enterprises

Original release
- Network: USA
- Release: August 4, 1997 – June 10, 1999

USA High is an American teen sitcom that ran on USA from August 4, 1997 to June 10, 1999, ending after 95 episodes. Produced by Peter Engel Productions, Rysher Entertainment and NBC Enterprises, the series revolves around six friends enrolled at the American Academy boarding school in Paris, France.

== Background Information ==
USA High ran for a total of 95 episodes. Season 1 consisted of 75 episodes and ran from August 4, 1997 through November 1998. Season 2 consisted of 20 episodes and aired from November 1998 until June 1999. It was rerun on USA Network through August 4, 2001.

USA High was paired with reruns of Saved by the Bell: The New Class for a weekday afternoon block on USA. The series' executive producer was Peter Engel, who was also responsible for the Saved by the Bell franchise, California Dreams, City Guys, and Hang Time. Its co-executive producers were Leslie Eberhard and Steve Slavkin (who was co-executive producer for the series' first 25 episodes only). The series was one of two post-Saved by the Bell: The College Years series executive produced by Engel that did not air as part of the TNBC lineup, Malibu, CA being the other.

== Cast ==
- Josh Holland as Jackson Greene
- Elena Lyons as Lauren Fontaine
- Thomas Magiar as Christian Mueller
- Marquita Terry as Winnie Barnes
- James Madio as Bobby Lazzarini (season 1)
- Kristen Miller as Ashley Elliot
- Angela Visser as Miss Gabrielle Dupree
- Nicholas Guest as Headmaster Patrick Elliot
- William James Jones as Dwane "Excess" Wilson (season 2)

== Episodes ==
Season	Episodes	Originally released	
Season	Episodes	First released	Last released
1	75	August 4, 1997	November 13, 1998
2	20	November 16, 1998	June 10, 1999
