= That's My Bush! =

American television sitcom

- The That's My Bush! intertitle, featuring actors portraying George W. Bush and wife Laura Bush
- Genre: Sitcom; Satire
- Created by: Trey Parker; Matt Stone
- Starring: Timothy Bottoms; Carrie Quinn Dolin; Kurt Fuller; Kristen Miller; Marcia Wallace; John D'Aquino
- Theme music composer: Trey Parker
- Composer: Kim Bullard
- Country of origin: United States
- Original language: English
- No. of seasons: 1
- No. of episodes: 8

Production
- Executive producers: Trey Parker; Matt Stone; Anne Garefino
- Running time: 22 minutes (approx.)
- Production companies: Important Television; Comedy Central

Original release
- Network: Comedy Central
- Release: April 4 – May 23, 2001

That's My Bush! is an American television sitcom that aired on Comedy Central from April 4 to May 23, 2001. The show was created by Trey Parker and Matt Stone, a comedy-duo best known for creating South Park.

Despite the political overtones, the show itself was more a broad lampoon of American sitcoms, including jokes, a laugh track, and stock characters such as klutzy secretary Princess (Kristen Miller), know-it-all maid Maggie (Marcia Wallace), and supposedly helpful next door neighbor Larry (John D'Aquino).

The series was conceived in the wake of the 2000 presidential election, between George W. Bush and Al Gore. Parker and Stone were sure that Gore would win the election, and tentatively titled the show Everybody Loves Al. However, due to the controversy regarding the election's outcome, the series was pushed back. Instead, the show was then plotted around Bush at the workplace.

The show received positive reviews from critics, with The New York Times commenting, "That's My Bush! is a satire of hero worship itself; it is the anti-West Wing and the first true post-Clinton comedy. [...] This politically astute criticism is embedded in so much hysterical humor that the series never seems weighty."

== Plot ==
The series centers on the fictitious personal life of President George W. Bush, played by Timothy Bottoms. Carrie Quinn Dolin played Laura Bush, and Kurt Fuller played Karl Rove.

Episodes dealt (with deliberate heavy-handedness) the topics of abortion, gun control, the war on drugs, drilling in the Arctic National Wildlife Refuge, and the death penalty. Every episode ended with George saying "One of these days, Laura, I'm gonna punch you in the face!", a parody of Jackie Gleason's line from The Honeymooners, "One of these days, POW!!! Right in the kisser!"

The show was more of a spoof of the banality of television sitcoms in general, rather than a cutting political satire. As The A.V. Club put it:

[That's My] Bush!'s irresistibly gimmicky premise—a workplace sitcom centering on Bush and his wife Laura—represents a perverse act of extended misdirection. While audiences waited for Parker and Stone to tear into the Bush administration, they instead attacked the hoary conventions of the 1970s and 1980s sitcoms, which proved a surprisingly apt target for satire and pop-culture riffing.

== Cast ==
- Timothy Bottoms as President George W. Bush
- Carrie Quinn Dolin as First Lady Laura Bush
- Kurt Fuller as Deputy Chief of Staff Karl Rove
- Marcia Wallace as Maggie Hawley
- Kristen Miller as Princess Stevenson
- John D'Aquino as Larry O'Shea

== Production ==
=== Development ===
Parker and Stone stated before the 2000 presidential election that they would create a satire about whoever won. According to their DVD commentary, they were "95% certain that Gore would win" and began developing the series under the title Everybody Loves Al. When the final election results were in limbo, production was delayed until the winner was determined. With Bush's election, the title became the entendre That's My Bush! The final episode involves Dick Cheney forcing Bush to step down, and featured an alternate title music called That's My Dick! which, later in the episode, changed to What a Dick!

The show was pitched to HBO, Fox, NBC, CBS, ABC, FX and MTV, who all turned down the series.

=== Writing ===
The entire idea behind the series was to parody sitcoms. The premise developed into a sitcom featuring the sitting U.S. president. Parker recalled the idea came about three months before the 2000 presidential election. The duo were "95 percent sure" that Democratic candidate Al Gore would win, and tentatively titled the show Everybody Loves Al. It was, essentially, the same show: a lovable main character, the sassy maid and the wacky neighbor. Parker said the producers did not want to make fun of politics, but instead lampoon sitcoms. The duo watched a lot of Fawlty Towers in preparation.

The duo signed a deal with Comedy Central to produce a live-action sitcom, titled Family First, scheduled to debut on February 28, 2001. They threw a party the night of the election with the writers, with intentions to begin writing the following Monday and shooting the show in January 2001 with the inauguration. With the confusion of who the president would be, the show's production was pushed back. The duo wanted to write a "family sitcom" with the Bush family.

Comedy Central, however, prohibited Parker and Stone from including the Bush twins (Jenna Bush and Barbara Pierce Bush). The writers then turned the Bush twins character into Princess. "An Aborted Dinner Date" was the show's pilot episode. The episode features Felix the Fetus, made and operated by the Chiodo Brothers, who later worked with Parker and Stone on Team America: World Police (2004). They also created the cat Punk'kin in "The First Lady's Persqueeter". The show's producers consider the second episode aired, "A Poorly Executed Plan", the true first episode.

This was Parker and Stone's first live-action production in association with the Writers Guild of America, West. The show's writers got a big dry-erase board; on one side, they would write down political ideas (like abortion or capital punishment), and on the other side they would write down typical sitcom stories (like frat buddies showing up or the characters getting trapped in a small space). They would then combine the two ideas, in what Stone described as "a Three's Company mix-up kind of thing."

=== Pre-production ===
That's My Bush! was filmed at Sony Pictures Studios, the first time Parker and Stone shot a show on a production lot. It was not shot in front of a live audience, so as to maintain control and by necessity, thanks to various shots they would be unable to do in a normal show. They had built several rooms from the White House in their studio (including a bedroom and dining room) and were allowed "one new, rotating set" per week.

Parker described the sets as "amazing," and they were in fact packaged up after the show's run and sent to other White House-related productions. The show's producers gained inspiration by going on a private tour of the White House thanks to executive producer Anne Garefino (who previously co-produced In Performance at the White House for PBS station WETA-TV). A White House usher showed the producers various rooms not allowed on normal tours, which allowed them to detail each set effectively.

At 3 (PST) Tuesday afternoon, just like everybody else, we were thinking, "Well, it's going to be a show about Gore." And we're sitting here with the writers and coming up with Gore ideas, and all of a sudden they pull Florida back out. And it was like, "Oh, wait a minute." It's just so funny that this election, the one our show hinged on, was the one that was just too close to call.

— Trey Parker, on the revision of the show

=== Casting ===
Casting was relatively simple; Parker and Stone came across a photo of Timothy Bottoms in Variety for a play he was doing in Santa Barbara. Parker and Stone called him in, and they found he was "perfect" for the role. (Bottoms would, in fact, go on to play Bush in two different films.) The plan was not to viciously "rip on" Bush or make him out to be a monster; in accordance with sitcom stereotypes, Bush was made a sweet and lovable oaf. Kurt Fuller was the last to be cast. Jeff Melman directed all eight episodes. This was the first time Parker was only writing, not directing.

=== Filming ===
Each episode was shot in two days. The weeks were spent in writing and pre-production while the cast rehearsed. Like South Park, in which Parker would be able to write a scene and see it animated a short time later, he and Stone could walk to rehearsals and see the cast rehearsing their script. Each episode commenced with a cold open, with a "cheesy" joke that segued into the theme song. The duo recalled that, with "stupid" titles, these scenes were often the hardest to write.

The episode "SDI-Aye-AYE!" features the first utterance of the word "Lemmiwinks", which Parker and the writers intended to be a parody of The Lord of the Rings. The word was later famously used in the South Park episode "The Death Camp of Tolerance". The show's first episode set a Comedy Central ratings record (at the time) for highest debut with over 2.9 million viewers tuning in; however, ratings dropped after this, with an average of 1.7 million viewers.

During the production of "Fare Thee Welfare", the series finale, producers knew the end was near as it would be very expensive. For example, for the episode "Eenie Meenie Miney Murder", Parker and Stone used a live bear, an animatronic bear, an actor in a bear suit, and a puppet bear, which ended up breaking their budget. Although the show received a fair amount of publicity and critical notice, according to Stone and Parker, the budget was too high, "about $1 million an episode."

== Cancellation ==
Comedy Central officially axed the series in August 2001, as a cost-cutting move; Stone was quoted as saying "A super-expensive show on a small cable network...the economics of it were just not going to work." The series continued via reruns, considering it a creative and critical success. Parker believed the show would not have survived after the September 11 attacks anyway, and Stone agreed, saying the show would not "play well". There was talk of a spin-off feature film for the series entitled George W. Bush and the Secret of the Glass Tiger. The concept extended the series' bait and switch gag: it would have to do with a Chinese invasion foiled by the President. Parker and Stone intended to develop it during the summer of 2002.

=== Retrospective ===
Parker recalls That's My Bush! "a great time in our lives," and "the most fun we've had in our careers". That's My Bush! has had an effect on the structure of South Park: prior to 2001, each South Park episode was broken up into four acts. While producing That's My Bush!, Parker and Stone found the three-act structure provided a better story, and South Park continued to use it in subsequent years. Stone called the show one of the most pleasant experiences of his life.

Bottoms went on to portray George W. Bush in two later films: in a comedic context in The Crocodile Hunter: Collision Course, and in a serious context in the television film DC 9/11: Time of Crisis.

== Episodes ==
No.	Title	Directed by	Written by	Original release date
1	"An Aborted Dinner Date"	Jeff Melman	Trey Parker	April 4, 2001
George tries to have a dinner with Laura and a publicity dinner at the same time. Political Issue: Pro-life and pro-choice rights. Sitcom Plot: Trying to attend two engagements at once.
2	"A Poorly Executed Plan"	Jeff Melman	Trey Parker	April 11, 2001
George tries to impress his old frat buddies with an execution. Political Issue: The death penalty. Sitcom Plot: A visit from old friends prompts an elaborate ruse.
3	"Eenie, Meenie, Miney, MURDER!"	Jeff Melman	Tony Barbieri & Trey Parker	April 18, 2001
George, going by the advice of a telephone psychic, believes he will be murdered by someone in the White House. Political Issue: Gun control laws. Sitcom Plot: One character mistakenly believes the other characters are plotting behind his back.
4	"SDI–Aye-AYE!"	Jeff Melman	Tom Stern & Trey Parker	April 25, 2001
George tries to illegally hook up cable and accidentally shoots a laser into Austria. Political Issue: The Strategic Defense Initiative (SDI). Sitcom Plot: Trying to conceal a blunder that the character was warned against making.
5	"The First Lady's Persqueeter"	Jeff Melman	Trey Parker & Amy Welsh	May 2, 2001
George tries to put Pun'kin, the Bush family cat to sleep, while Laura tries to improve her "downtown area" after mishearing George's conversation. Political Issue: Assisted suicide. Sitcom Plot: Mishearing a conversation leads to a wildly incorrect conclusion.
6	"Mom 'E' D.E.A. Arrest"	Jeff Melman	Kyle McCulloch, Trey Parker & Matt Stone	May 9, 2001
Laura tries to impress George's mother Barbara by organizing the War on Drugs Arrest ceremony while George accidentally takes ecstasy. Political Issue: The war on drugs. Sitcom Plot: Trying to impress the mother-in-law.
7	"Trapped in a Small Environment"	Jeff Melman	Trey Parker	May 16, 2001
Laura and George successfully set up Karl with one of Laura's friends, only to find out that he is married, while rioters outside protest oil drilling in Alaska. Political Issue: Oil drilling in Alaska. Sitcom Plot: Characters that do not get along must cooperate when they are trapped together; bottle episode.
8	"Fare Thee Welfare"	Jeff Melman	Matt Prager & Trey Parker	May 23, 2001
Series finale. After losing an important peace treaty, George is removed from office by Dick Cheney and tries to find a new job. Political Issue: Presidential impeachment. Sitcom Plot: Being fired from a job. Also parodies the conventions of series finales and spin-offs.

== Home media ==
A DVD set containing the entire series, plus commentaries by cast and crew, titled That's My Bush! The Definitive Collection, was released in North America on October 24, 2006.

== See also ==
- Lil' Bush, animated series satirizing Bush, also on Comedy Central
- Cory in the House, a series where John D'Aquino plays the president.
- 1600 Penn
- The President Show, another Comedy Central sitcom focusing on the sitting U.S. president.
- Our Cartoon President, an animated satirical comedy series about President Donald Trump.
- Heil Honey I'm Home!
