= Queens Supreme =

American courtroom dramedy television series

- Title card
- Genre: Comedy drama
- Created by: Kevin Fox
- Written by: Keith Samples; Christopher Ambrose; Marjorie David; Kevin Fox; Stephen Godchaux; Mona Mansour; Linda McGibney; James D. Solomon
- Directed by: Keith Samples; Jace Alexander; Adam Bernstein; Bill D'Elia; Michael Fields; Stuart Gillard; Jefery Levy; John Patterson; Matthew Penn; David Platt; Tim Robbins; Paul Shapiro; Rick Wallace
- Starring: Oliver Platt; Robert Loggia; Annabella Sciorra; L. Scott Caldwell; Marcy Harriell; James Madio
- Composers: Douglas J. Cuomo; Chris Hajian
- Country of origin: United States
- Original language: English
- No. of seasons: 1
- No. of episodes: 13 (10 unaired)

Production
- Executive producers: Julia Roberts; Kevin Fox; Deborah Schindler; Aaron Spelling; Erwin Stoff; E. Duke Vincent; Marjorie David; Keith Samples; Elaine Goldsmith-Thomas
- Producers: Stephen Godchaux; Steve Rose; Elaine Goldsmith-Thomas; Linda McGibney; Daniel and Peter Thomas
- Production locations: Flushing, Queens, New York; Long Island City, Queens, New York
- Cinematography: Ron Fortunato; Tony C. Jannelli
- Editors: James Y. Kwei; Vanessa Procopio; Tom Swartwout
- Camera setup: Chaim Kantor; Peter Nolan
- Running time: 60 minutes (with commercials)
- Production companies: Shadowland Productions; Revolution Television; Red Om Films; Spelling Television; Eye Productions

Original release
- Network: CBS
- Release: January 10 – January 24, 2003

Queens Supreme is an American courtroom comedy drama television series created by Dan and Peter Thomas, which aired on CBS from January 10 to January 24, 2003. The series had a strong cast and considerable financial backing, especially from Julia Roberts's Shoelace Productions, Spelling Television and Revolution Studios; however, poor ratings forced its cancellation after three episodes.

== Premise ==
The series starred Oliver Platt as New York judge Jack Moran who, with his equally eccentric and colorful colleagues, presides over court cases at the real-life Queens Supreme Court in Long Island City, Queens.

== Characters ==
- Jack Moran (Oliver Platt) – a brilliant, cynical judge whose integrity and wisdom are often overshadowed by his non-conformist and occasionally bizarre courtroom behavior.
- Judge Thomas O'Neill (Robert Loggia) – the highest-ranking judge at the courthouse, O'Neill serves as the voice of reason and it often falls upon him to keep the peace among his colleagues.
- Kim Vicidomini (Annabella Sciorra) – newly appointed to the courthouse, she is a young and ambitious judge who is both highly skilled and has political connections.
- Rose Barnea (L. Scott Caldwell) – another senior judge, Barnea is hardworking and often brutally frank. She is particularly critical of Kim Vicidomini soon after her arrival.
- Carmen Hui (Marcy Harriell) and Mike Powell (James Madio) – two helpful law clerks who assist the judges.

== Production ==
The idea for the series came about when two New York attorneys, twin brothers Dan and Peter Thomas, were discussing courtroom stories based on their shared experiences in Queens while on a plane flight to California in 2001. One of the passengers, a Hollywood producer, was sitting next to them and mentioned that they could be the basis for a television series. Indeed, the producer brought the idea to screenwriter Kevin Fox who later successfully pitched it to CBS. Fox was initially hesitant in becoming involved, feeling there were too many courtroom dramas already, but agreed after spending time at the New York Supreme Court himself.

The project was helped along by Dan's wife Elaine Goldsmith-Thomas, head of Red Om Films (a subsidiary of Julia Roberts' production company Shoelace Productions) and a partner in Joe Roth's Revolution Studios, who was then looking for film and television products to develop. Her involvement was partially responsible in bringing such a high-profile cast and crew to the series.

The television pilot was filmed at both the Long Island City and New York State Supreme Courthouses by actor Tim Robbins in mid-August 2002 and 12 episodes were eventually ordered by the network. A midseason replacement for Robbery Homicide Division, Queens Supreme premiered on January 10, 2003, alongside Presidio Med in the prime-time Friday night timeslot.

== Episodes ==
No.	Title	Directed by	Written by	Original release date	Prod. code
1	"One Angry Man"	David Platt	Stephen Godchaux	January 10, 2003	108
2	"Pilot"	Tim Robbins	Kevin Fox	January 17, 2003	100
3	"Flawed Heroes"	Matthew Penn	Linda McGibney	January 24, 2003	109
4	"Supreme Heat"	John Patterson	James Solomon	Unaired	101
5	"Mad About You"	TBD	Christopher Ambrose	Unaired	104
6	"Permanent Markers"	TBD	Mona Mansour	Unaired	105
7	"Let's Make a Deal"	TBD	Stephen Godchaux & Christopher Ambrose	Unaired	106
8	"Things Change"	TBD	Marjorie David	Unaired	TBA
9	"Case by Case"	TBD	Kevin Fox & Stephen Godchaux	Unaired	108
10	"The House Next Door"	TBD	Stephen Godchaux	Unaired	107
11	"Words That Wound"	TBD	Kevin Fox	Unaired	110
12	"That Voodoo That You Do"	TBD	Marjorie David	Unaired	111
13	"The Eyes Have It"	Keith Samples	Keith Samples	Unaired	112

== Sources ==
- Grace, Melissa (March 25, 2002). "TV Tale Born At 10,000 Ft". New York Daily News. Archived from the original on August 8, 2019.
- Rice, Lynette (April 9, 2002). "Executive Decision: Julia Roberts to exec-produce Queens Supreme -- The Pretty Woman is backing the courtroom drama; Tim Robbins directs". Entertainment Weekly.
- "New TV Show 'QueensSupreme' Begins Shooting At Silvercup Studios". Queens Tribune. Long Island City Business Development Corporation. August 6, 2002. Archived from the original on June 8, 2011.
- Andreeva, Nellie (August 13, 2002). "CBS courting Sedgwick for 'Queens' role". Hollywood Reporter. 374 (37).
- O'Grady, Jim (October 20, 2002). "New York Observed; Truth. Justice. Long Island City?". The New York Times.
- "CBS airs 'Queens'". Lubbock Avalanche-Journal. December 14, 2002. Archived from the original on April 1, 2012.
- Battaglio, Stephen (January 2, 2003). "Holding Court In Queens A New TV Series Set In The Borough Features Some Imprudent Jurists". New York Daily News. Archived from the original on August 8, 2019.
- Frutkin, A.J. (June 1, 2003). "CBS Places Bets on Queens". Mediaweek. Archived from the original on April 26, 2016.
- Jicha, Tom (January 8, 2003). "'Queens Supreme,' premiering Friday on CBS". South Florida Sun-Sentinel.
- Bianco, Robert (January 9, 2003). "'Queens' far less than supreme". USA Today.
- Holston, Noel (January 9, 2003). "'Queens' Is Not Supreme: CBS' new courthouse show misses its mark". Baltimore Sun. Archived from the original on June 3, 2011.
- Levesque, John (January 10, 2003). "Credibility gap leaves 'Queens' supremely compromised". Seattle Post-Intelligencer.
- Bianculli, David (January 10, 2003). "CBS' 'Supreme' Oughta Be Benched". New York Daily News. Archived from the original on August 8, 2019.
- Tucker, Ken (January 10, 2003). "TV Review: Queens Supreme". Entertainment Weekly.
- "Tufts E-News: All Rise!". Tufts University. January 10, 2003. Archived from the original on June 14, 2010.
- Gates, Katie Marie (January 24, 2003). "CBS show devalues the word 'Supreme'". Michigan Daily.
- Battaglio, Stephen; Donna Petrozzello (January 28, 2003). "Inner Tube". New York Daily News. Archived from the original on August 8, 2019.
- "CBS cans 'Queens Supreme,' 'Presidio Med'". San Francisco Chronicle. January 29, 2003.
- McKenzie, Shawn (January 29, 2003). ""Queens Supreme" Review". EntertainYourBrain.com.
- Asimow, Michael (February 6, 2003). "Feature Article: Queens Supreme - Who Cares About Judges?". Picturing Justice: The On-Line Journal of Law & Popular Culture. Archived from the original on April 21, 2003.
- Corcos, Christine (February 7, 2003). "Feature Article: Queens Supreme". Picturing Justice: The On-Line Journal of Law & Popular Culture. Archived from the original on April 21, 2003.
- Blair, Cynthia (2009). "2002: "Queens Supreme" Filmed in Long Island City". Newsday.
