= The Fallen Ones =

- Based on: biblical reference to giants (Genesis 6:4)
- Written by: Kevin VanHook
- Directed by: Kevin VanHook
- Starring: Casper Van Dien; Kristen Miller; Geoffrey Lewis; Navid Negahban; Scott Whyte; Tom Bosley; Robert Wagner
- Music by: Kevin Kaska; William Richter
- Country of origin: United States
- Original language: English

Production
- Producers: Karen Bailey; Fred T. Kuehnert; Kevin VanHook
- Cinematography: Matt Steinauer
- Editor: Kevin VanHook
- Running time: 89 min
- Production company: The Fallen Ones Inc.

Original release
- Network: Sci Fi Channel
- Release: May 14, 2005

The Fallen Ones is a 2005 American made-for-television science fiction horror film written and directed by Kevin VanHook. A Sci Fi Channel original film, it stars Casper Van Dien, Kristen Miller, Geoffrey Lewis, Navid Negahban, Scott Whyte, Tom Bosley and Robert Wagner. The plot follows an archaeologist who discovers the mummified remains of a giant connected to the biblical Nephilim.

== Plot ==
Five thousand years ago, in Sumer, the fallen angels had intercourse with human females and their offspring were a race of giants called Nephilim, destroyed by the great flood. The evil angel Ammon (Navid Negahban) mummifies his son Aramis to save him and hides in hell. In the present day, the archaeologist Matt Fletcher (Casper Van Dien) finds Aramis tomb while excavating for building a resort for the entrepreneur Morton (Robert Wagner). The engineer Angela (Kristen Miller) joins the team, giving support in the diggings. When some workers mysteriously vanish, Morton hires the security force of Ammon to find the missing men. However, his real intention is to resurrect Aramis in the eclipse of the moon and dominate the human race with a new breed of giants. In the end, by creating a flood, they are able to drown both Aramis and Ammon, but not before Ammon reveals he has other children scattered at the four corners of the globe.

== Cast ==
- Casper Van Dien as Matt Fletcher
- Kristen Miller as Angela
- Geoffrey Lewis as Gus
- Navid Negahban as Ammon
- Scott Whyte as Mickey
- Tom Bosley as Rabbi Eli Schmitt
- Robert Wagner as Morton
- Saginaw Grant as Joseph
- Irwin Keyes as Pale-Eye Priest
- Carel Struycken as High Priest #1
- Braeden Marcott as High Priest #2
- Robert Allen Mukes as Aramis
- Cameron VanHook as Giant Mummy
- Sahra Silanee as Lot's Daughter #1
- Regina K. Jones as Paltith, Lot's Daughter #2
- Katie L'Heureaux as Servant Girl #1
- Avena Lee as Servant Girl #2
- Nautica Thorn as Servant Girl #3
- Pablo Espinosa as Dennis, The Security Guard
- Shane P. Allen as Deputy #1
- Karen Bailey as Deputy #2
- Jodi Taffel as Construction Chick
- Melissa Jones Harper as Female Student
- Jeff Coatney as The Narrator
- Osiris The Cat as Angela's Cat
- Michelle Rae Cannon as Sacrifice Servant (uncredited)
- Randal Reeder as Leader of Soldiers (uncredited)
