= Scott Land =

American puppeteer

Scott Land (born 1962) is a producer and puppeteer. He started puppetry at the age of ten after seeing Bob Baker perform his marionettes at the National Orange Show in 1972. While later studying psychology at UCLA, he worked for Bob Baker Marionettes as a puppet builder and as Baker's own roadshow puppeteer. His puppetry features in nearly every scene of Paramount Pictures’ Team America: World Police.

== Filmography ==
- Team America: World Police (2004)
