= Single White Female 2: The Psycho =

- DVD cover
- Directed by: Keith Samples
- Written by: Glenn Hobart; Andy Hurst; Ross Helford
- Produced by: Marc Bienstock
- Starring: Kristen Miller; Allison Lange; Tad Babcock; Francois Giroday; Rif Hutton; Brooke Burns
- Cinematography: Thomas M. Harting
- Edited by: Peter Devaney Flanagan
- Music by: Steven Stern
- Production companies: Destination Films; Third Street Pictures
- Distributed by: Sony Pictures Home Entertainment
- Release date: October 25, 2005 (United States)
- Running time: 91 minutes
- Country: United States
- Language: English

Single White Female 2: The Psycho is a 2005 American direct-to-video psychological thriller film, a sequel to the 1992 film Single White Female and the second installment in the Single White Female film series. Directed by Keith Samples, it stars Kristen Miller, Allison Lange and Brooke Burns. Single White Female 2: The Psycho was released by Sony Pictures Home Entertainment on October 25, 2005. It was universally panned by critics.

== Plot ==
In New York, PR colleagues and roommates Holly Parker and Jan Lambert are disputing a promotion in their agency. The unethical Jan deceives Holly and sends her to Chicago. Meanwhile, she seduces Holly's boyfriend David Kray, in the opening of a fancy restaurant he owns, and they have a one-night stand. When Holly arrives back home, she finds out David cheated on her with Jan, and decides to move into a new apartment. She schedules a meeting with the needy Tess Kositch and they become roommates and friends. When Tess cuts and dyes her hair identically to Holly's, she sees that her new roommate is obsessed with her. When Holly follows Tess to an underground nightclub called "Sin", she realizes that the girl is deranged. But Tess wants to be her friend and put Holly out of her misery by eliminating her former bad friends.

== Cast ==
- Kristen Miller as Holly Parker
  - Courtney Taylor Burness as young Holly
- Allison Lange as Tess Kositch
- Brooke Burns as Jan Lambert
- Todd Babcock as David Kray
- Francois Giroday as Leonard Ripken
- Tracey McCall as Lacey
- Rif Hutton as Detective Rousch
- Kyme as Doctor
- James Madio as Sam
- Gary Riotto as Wade

== Critical response ==
Critical reception for Single White Female 2: The Psycho has been predominantly negative. David Nusair of Reel Film Reviews panned the movie heavily and described it as "bad, incompetently made and with virtually no redeeming qualities." DVD Talk was also heavily critical of all aspects of the film, especially its title, and commented "Single White Female 2: The Psycho? Is that the title? Did I miss something? In the original Single White Female, did Jennifer Jason Leigh not play a psycho? Or maybe there was a Single White Female 1.5 in which all the pretty roommates did nothing but drink tea and give each other perms." DVD Verdict also panned the film and advised any potential viewers to avoid the movie as it was "the original movie minus all of the good stuff".
