= Love Lies Bleeding (2008 film) =

- Directed by: Keith Samples
- Written by: Brian Strasmann
- Produced by: Mark Handel; Matt Luber; Lena Roklin; Keith Samples
- Starring: Brian Geraghty; Jenna Dewan; Christian Slater
- Cinematography: Paul Elliott
- Edited by: Peter Flanagan
- Music by: Larry Groupé
- Distributed by: Screen Gems; Sony Pictures Entertainment
- Release date: January 15, 2008
- Running time: 89 minutes
- Country: United States
- Language: English
- Budget: $3 million

Love Lies Bleeding is a 2008 American thriller film directed by Keith Samples that stars Christian Slater. Filming took place in Albuquerque, New Mexico.

== Plot ==
Duke (Brian Geraghty) and Amber (Jenna Dewan) are a financially strapped young couple, both working menial jobs to survive, while their gangster neighbors continue to steal Duke and Amber's things. One day Amber gets home and finds the neighbors in the house, stealing a few things. They beat her up and leave. Duke gets home and finds her, and is so angered he goes out and purchases a gun. Meanwhile, a corrupt DEA Agent named Pollen (Christian Slater) is after a cache of dirty money that belongs to him. He tracks it back to the house Duke's neighbors live in and gets there before Duke does. There is a shootout, and Pollen is injured. Duke arrives and finds the aftermath, and the money. Duke takes the money, believing that it will mean a better life for himself and Amber. Pollen tries to stop him, but passes out due to his injuries.

Duke returns home, and he and Amber flee. Pollen wakes up and finds two other Agents after the money, and they team up and go after them to get back what is theirs. Duke and Amber buy a car and travel to an expensive Albuquerque hotel, and spend a few days gambling and having fun, and finally getting married. Amber also tells Duke that she is pregnant. Pollen and his men arrive the next day, however, and start searching for Duke. A room-service man takes the money from them, and Duke goes after him to get the cash back. Amber, meanwhile, is ambushed by Pollen, who threatens to kill her if she doesn't tell him where the money is. Amber tells him that Duke left her after she got pregnant, and Pollen believes her. He is about to kill her when she cuts him with a shard of glass and kills one of the other detectives. Pollen and the other Agent go after them, but Duke and Amber eventually escape, leaving the money hidden behind a bush as a bargaining tool should Pollen catch them.

Pollen is questioned by two suspicious detectives, who start following the DEA Agent around. Duke soon calls Pollen and says he doesn't want any more of it, and that they'll give him the money that day if they let Duke and Amber go. Pollen agrees, and deduces that they would have left the money at the hotel for safety. Duke goes back to get it, but the money is gone. He finds out a gardener quit the previous day, and he goes after the gardener. Sure enough the man took the money, and Duke leaves the man some of it when he learns the gardener has children.

Pollen and Morton follow Duke and Amber directly behind them. Duke pulls off at an abandoned warehouse, and the DEA Agents follow, with the detectives on their trails. After exchanging words, Pollen reveals that Morton has Amber tied up. Pollen then takes out horrific tools to make sure that Duke didn't tell anyone about what Pollen has done, but Duke fights back, killing the other detective. Pollen wounds Duke and the two fight. Pollen beats Duke with an iron pipe, but before Pollen can finish the beating, Amber kills him with Morton's shotgun. Duke dies of his injuries. One of the detectives enters the building, and unseen by Amber, manipulates the evidence so it appears that Pollen is at fault. Sometime later Amber is feeding a baby boy, and the camera pans back to show a new suburban house.

== Cast ==
- Chris Ashworth as Eddie
- Jenna Dewan as Amber
- Brian Geraghty as "Duke"
- James Madio as Bernie
- Ryan O'Quinn as Room Service Steve (voice)
- Luce Rains as Gault
- Alfredo Ramirez as Gardener
- Craig Sheffer as Morton
- Arron Shiver as Room Service Waiter
- Christian Slater as Pollen
- Tara Summers as Detective Alice Sands
- Kim Thrasher as Nurse
- Ellen Treanor as Female Cop
- Jacob Vargas as Detective Billy Jones
- Eric Martinez as Gangbanger #1
