= Switchback (film) =

- Theatrical release poster
- Directed by: Jeb Stuart
- Written by: Jeb Stuart
- Produced by: Gale Anne Hurd
- Starring: Dennis Quaid; Danny Glover; Jared Leto; Ted Levine; R. Lee Ermey
- Cinematography: Oliver Wood
- Edited by: Conrad Buff
- Music by: Basil Poledouris
- Production company: Pacific Western Production
- Distributed by: Paramount Pictures; Rysher Entertainment
- Release date: October 31, 1997
- Running time: 118 minutes
- Country: United States
- Language: English
- Budget: $30-38 million
- Box office: $6.5 million

Switchback is a 1997 American crime thriller film written and directed by Jeb Stuart in his directorial debut. It stars Dennis Quaid, Danny Glover, Jared Leto, Ted Levine, William Fichtner and R. Lee Ermey. An FBI agent tracks his son's kidnapper to Amarillo, Texas, where two lawmen are seeking to use the case in their election bid.

== Plot ==
Late one night, a woman is killed while babysitting a young boy; the killer then kidnaps the boy. A few months later a man and cleaning woman are killed at a motel in Amarillo, Texas. Amarillo's sheriff, Buck Olmstead, is up for reelection. Both he and his opponent, police chief Jack McGinnis, strive to solve a big murder case before election day. Meanwhile, hitchhiker Lane Dixon is picked up by Bob Goodall, an affable drifter driving a white Cadillac Eldorado.

FBI special agent Frank LaCrosse arrives in Amarillo and tells Olmstead an elusive serial killer is responsible for the murders. Olmstead discovers that LaCrosse was taken off the case because the kidnapped boy is his son, Andy. LaCrosse has a cryptic note from the killer who is antagonized by the F.B.I. task force's relentless pursuit; the note says that to find his son, LaCrosse will have to kill him first. It includes other clues which are later revealed. LaCrosse teams up with the reluctant Amarillo sheriff's department. The FBI agent's tactics initially concern Olmstead, particularly after discovering LaCrosse's personal conflict. He also worries that cooperating with the suspended FBI agent might cost his own job.

Dixon becomes a prime suspect in the murders, but with LaCrosse on his trail, Goodall is revealed as the killer. At a mechanic's shop where his car has been repaired, Goodall draws a knife on the mechanic, actually an old friend and former co-worker, because he observes a state trooper checking out the white Cadillac. Unseen by Dixon, Goodall kills his friend who could link him to the car. As Goodall and Dixon ride on, building a friendly rapport, Goodall tells the hitchhiker about his son. He asks Dixon to look after the boy if anything happens to him. Dixon agrees, and Goodall gives him the boy's address. The authorities discover that the driver of the white Cadillac at the last murder scene fits Dixon's description. No one mentions Goodall. Police roadblocks neglect the mountain roads which are nearly impassable after a blizzard.

Goodall's overconfident driving along the treacherous icy backroads causes the car to careen off a cliff. The car is wedged against a bushy tree on the cliff edge, with Goodall trapped in the driver's seat. Dixon, thrown free in the snow, climbs through the passenger window and cuts Goodall free. Goodall then saves Dixon after the younger man nearly falls to his death retrieving his backpack from the car.

The two men walk to a small town, planning to catch a train west. Dixon overhears men saying that the murderer is driving a white Cadillac. He suspects Goodall, but his suspicions are allayed when newly elected sheriff McGinnis puts out an erroneous radio announcement that the killer has been arrested. The man in custody had Goodall's stolen and abandoned vehicle, and Goodall is convincing that he could not be the killer. Reconciled, Goodall and Dixon catch the train and ride in a car with Tex, another friend of Goodall's. Tex grows suspicious when Goodall hands him matches from the Amarillo motel where the two murders happened. Goodall kills Tex, proving to Dixon that Goodall is the real killer.

LaCrosse, guided by Goodall's cryptic clues, chases the train. After wrecking his car, he travels overland on foot and, intercepting the train, jumps atop it. Dixon knocks Goodall down just as LaCrosse enters the railroad car. LaCrosse confronts Dixon, who professes his innocence. Goodall ambushes LaCrosse from behind. They fight until Goodall grabs Dixon, holding a knife at his throat and taunting LaCrosse, who attacks. Goodall cuts Dixon's throat, but not fatally. The fight between LaCrosse and Goodall moves out onto the snow-scraper, a large metal beam on the side of the train. As the two men battle, hanging onto the beam, Goodall's grip slips. He reminds LaCrosse that he must kill him to locate his son. Goodall drops off the train laughing, tumbling backwards down a snowy slope until he is fatally impaled by a tree branch.

LaCrosse, believing his son is lost, tends to Dixon, who cannot speak due to his throat wound. Dixon realizes Goodall gave him a clue to the boy's whereabouts and writes it on the floor with a felt tip pen. At that address, LaCrosse finds his kidnapped son playing in the neighbor's backyard.

== Cast ==
- Dennis Quaid as FBI Special Agent Frank LaCrosse
- Danny Glover as Bob Goodall
- Jared Leto as Dr. Lane Dixon M.D.
- R. Lee Ermey as Sheriff Buck Olmstead
- William Fichtner as Jack McGinnis
- Ted Levine as Deputy Nate Braden
- Walt Goggins as Bud
- Maggie Roswell as Fae
- Allison Smith as Becky
- Julio Oscar Mechoso as Jorge Martinez
- Kevin Cooney as Grant Montgomery
- Leo Burmester as Clyde "Shorty" Callahan
- Brent Hinkley as Man on Porch

== Production ==
In November 1993, it was reported that Paramount Pictures head Sherry Lansing Going West in America, the first screenplay ever written by Jeb Stuart, in a preemptive purchase estimated $ 1 million against $ 2 million with Stuart to re-write the script and also serve as executive producer. Stuart wrote the original script, about a Philadelphia cop who tracks a killer through the Southwestern United States, in 1986 but went unproduced until Stuart's success with Die Hard and The Fugitive reignited interest. 20th Century Fox considered buying the script in 1991 to develop as a vehicle for Steven Seagal until a dispute between Seagal and the studio over his unmade directorial debut Man of Honor curtailed that development. Stuart had performed a rewrite of Drop Zone for Paramount which both the studio and director John Badham had both been pleased with and after Stuart presented Going West in America with his new approach to Lansing they enthusiastically accepted it. In January 1996, it was reported Danny Glover had been cast as the villain and would star opposite Dennis Quaid. In April 1996, it was reported reported that Rysher Entertainment would provide the film's $30 million budget and distribute the film internationally.

The film was developed under various working titles including Going West and Zig Zag before ultimately settling on Switchback. Its visual effects were designed by veteran studio VIFX/Video Image. The Denver & Rio Grande Railroad Snowplow AX-044, featured near the end of the film, is listed on the Colorado State Register of Historic Properties and is on permanent display at the Pioneer Village Museum in Hot Sulphur Springs, Colorado.

== Release ==
In March 1997, it was reported that Paramount Pictures had showcased Switchback at ShoWest ’97 to promote the film as part of its 1997 release lineup to theater owners including an appearance by star Dennis Quaid.

Switchback was theatrically released in the United States on October 31, 1997 A home video release followed on June 16, 1998.

In July 1997, it was reported that Rysher Entertainment following three years of activity in the business of theatrical films that failed to yield any financial success and would release two final films consisting of Switchback (at the time known as Go West) and A Smile Like Yours to fulfill contractual obligations to Paramount Pictures.

== Reception ==
The film grossed $6.5 million in the US and had a budget of $38 million.

On Rotten Tomatoes, the film has a 31% rating based on 26 reviews, with an average rating of 4.8/10. The critics consensus reads, "Burdened by its heavy load of digressive plot turns and uneven performances, Switchback never gains any sense of narrative momentum." Audiences polled by CinemaScore gave the film an average grade of "B-" on an A+ to F scale.

Stephen Holden of The New York Times describes the film as "a disorganized mess". He faults Quaid for being too dour and Glover for being too likable. Both Holden and Roger Ebert praised the film's atmosphere, especially its location shots. Ebert found the setting and the minor characters, like Ermey's sheriff, the most charming parts of the film, concluding, "What we have here is a potentially good movie swamped by the weight of Hollywood formulas it is forced to carry".
