= James Madio =

American actor

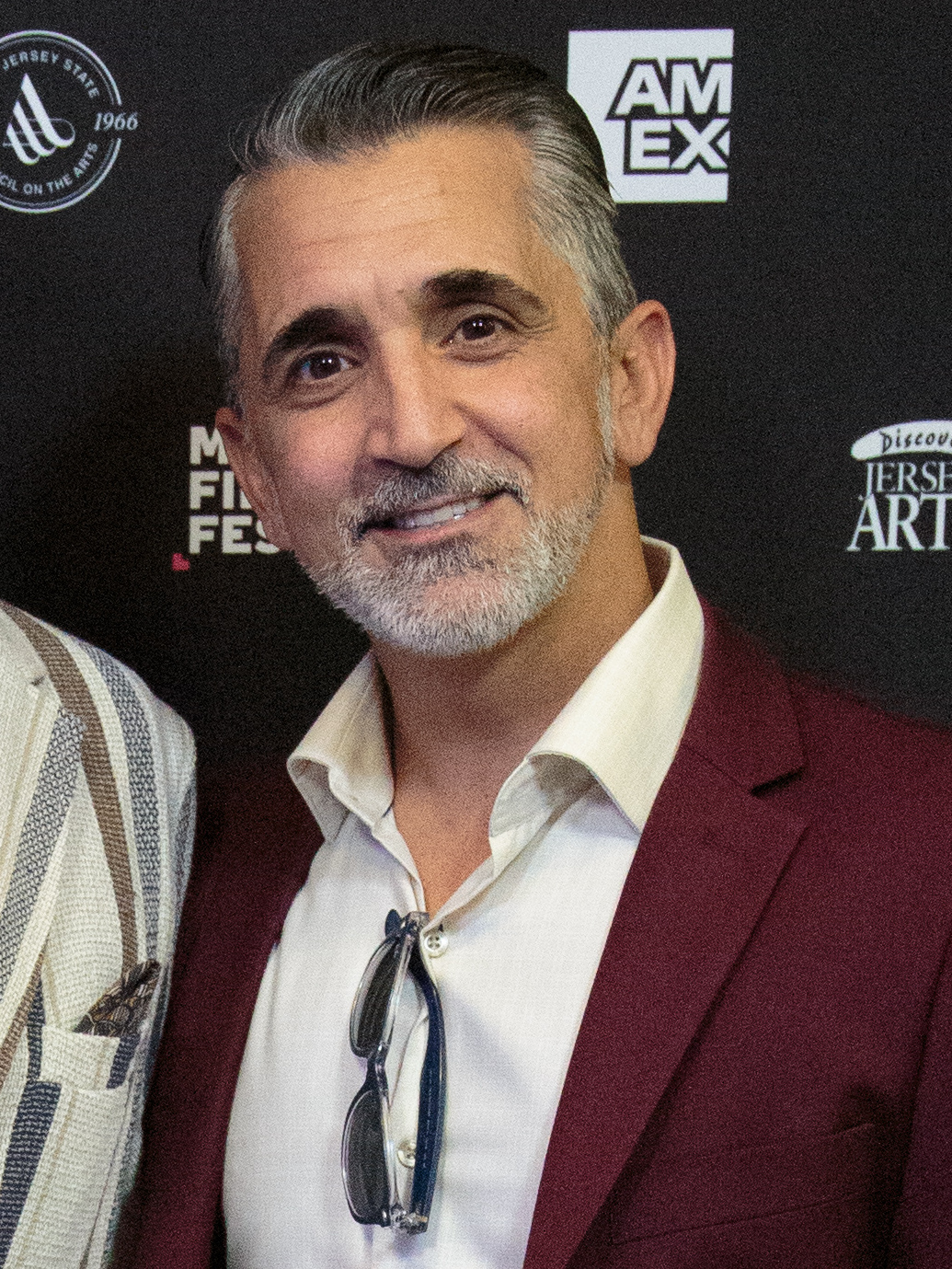
- Madio in 2023
- Born: November 22, 1975 (age 50); The Bronx, New York City, U.S.
- Occupation: Actor
- Years active: 1991–present

James Madio (born 22 November 1975) is an American actor, known for his roles in USA High, Hook and as Technician Fourth Grade Frank Perconte in Band of Brothers.

== Career ==
Madio was born and raised in the Bronx borough of New York City. At the age of 15, he had his first audition in Steven Spielberg's 1991 film Hook. He landed the role of "Don't Ask", one of the Lost Boys. Among the cast of Hook was Academy Award winner Dustin Hoffman, who had been cast as the villainous Captain Hook. Hoffman took notice of Madio and had him cast as his character's son in the 1992 comedy Hero.

He later appeared alongside Leonardo DiCaprio in the 1995 film The Basketball Diaries as a teenage drug addict. In 1997 Madio landed a regular role on the teen sitcom USA High where he played funny-man Bobby Lazzerini during the show's first season.

He has played lead roles in television series including miniseries Band of Brothers, in which he portrayed Frank Perconte. Madio contacted Perconte to develop ideas on how to play the real-life sergeant as well as to understand Perconte's background and history. In 2003 Madio was cast in a main role of Mike Powell on the short-lived CBS courtroom drama Queens Supreme.

In recent years, Madio has been focused on voice-acting and acting in independent films. He made a 2011 guest appearance on an episode of the new TV Land comedy series The Exes. In 2021, Madio was cast as Carmine, right hand to crime boss Joe Colombo (played by Giovanni Ribisi) in the Paramount+ limited streaming series The Offer, which details the making of the film The Godfather.

== Filmography ==
Key
†	Denotes works that have not yet been released

Film
Year	Film	Role	Other notes
1991	Hook	Don't Ask	One of the Lost Boys
1992	The Godson	Billy Cardillo	Short film
1992	Mac	Young Niccolo "Mac" Vitelli	
1992	Hero	Joey	
1994	Every Good Boy	Max	Short film
1995	The Basketball Diaries	Pedro	
1999	The Gifted	Eddie Fontaine	
2000	If Tomorrow Comes	Cory	
2004	Shark Tale	Great White #2 / Hammerhead	Voice
2005	Searching for Bobby D	Mike "Young Mike"	
2005	Single White Female 2: The Psycho	Sam	Direct-to-video
2007	Slice	Anthony Leone	Short film
2007	Smith and Mike on a Tuesday	Bruno	Short film
2007	The Box	Rob Ortiz	
2008	Love Lies Bleeding	Bernie	
2008	West of Brooklyn	Jimmy Boy	
2008	Dough Boys	Kelly	
2009	Sheltered	Carl	Short film
2010	Kick-Ass	Henchman	
2012	Astronaut: The Last Push	Nathan Miller	
2013	No God, No Master	Nicola Sacco	
2014	Jersey Boys	Stosh	
2015	The Week	Neil	
2019	Bottom of the 9th	Joey Cosenza	
2020	Blackjack: The Jackie Ryan Story	Marty Doyle	
2024	The Featherweight	Willie Pep	
Television
Year	Title	Role	Notes
1991	Doogie Howser, M.D.	Jimmy Pellegrino	Episode: "It's A Wonderful Laugh"
1992	Lifestories: Families in Crisis	Anthony	Episode: "Blood Brothers: The Joey DiPaolo Story"
1992	Blossom	Silvio	Episode: "Houseguests"
1992	The Commish	Rip	Episode: "Judgement Day"
1993	Law & Order	Andy	Episode: "Born Bad"
1997–1999	USA High	Bobby "Lazz" Lazzarini	Main role, 75 episodes
2001	Band of Brothers	T/4 Frank Perconte	Main role, 9 episodes
2002	JAG	PO Jack Horton	Episode: "Capital Crime"
2002	Arli$$	Max	Episode: "End Game"
2003	Queens Supreme	Mike Powell	Main role, 13 episodes
2006	Related	Billy Sullivan	Episode: "London Calling"
2007	Viva Laughlin	Carlo "Fingers" Sutigato	Episode: "What a Whale Wants"
2008	Las Vegas	Ronnie Torres	Episode: "2 On 2"
2008	The Cleaner	Jimmy Alvarez	Episode: "Let It Ride"
2009	CSI: Miami	Scott Aguilar	Episode: "And They're Offered"
2009	Glenn Martin, DDS	Jimmy Donuts	Voice role; episode: "We've Created a Mobster"
2010	Cold Case	Cody "Squirrel" Blanchard	Episode: "Flashover"
2010	Bones	Eddie Ceraficki	Episode: "The Bones on the Blue Line"
2011	The Exes	Robbie Gordon	Episode: "A Little Romance"
2013	Castle	Eddie Maslon	Episode: "The Fast and the Furriest"
2016	Blue Bloods	Dom	Episode: "Blast from the Past"
2022	The Offer	Carmine	5 episodes
2024	The Penguin	Milos Grapa	3 episodes
Video games
Year	Title	Role	Notes
2005	Call of Duty 2	Private Donnie McCloskey	
2005	Call of Duty 2: Big Red One	Various	
2009	Red Faction: Guerrilla	Various	
