= Kristen Miller =

American actress (born 1976)

- Born: Manhattan Beach, California, U.S.
- Occupation: Actress
- Years active: 1995–present
- Spouse: Morgan Langley (m. 2007)

Kristen Miller is an American actress. She is best known for her roles as Ashley Elliot on the sitcom USA High (1997–1999) and Deedra "D.D." Cummings on the action-adventure series She Spies (2002–2004).

Miller has also had recurring roles and made guest appearances on many television shows, including Undressed (2000), That's My Bush! (2001), Charmed (2004), Two and a Half Men (2005), Joey (2005), I Hate My 30's (2007), Las Vegas (2008), 90210 (2009), Dexter (2011), Mad Men (2012), Castle (2012) and The Glades (2013). Her films include Cherry Falls (2000), Team America: World Police (2004), The Fallen Ones (2005) and Single White Female 2: The Psycho (2005). She also provided the voice-over role for the character Rio in the video game Lifeline (2004).

== Personal life ==
Miller grew up in Manhattan Beach, California. She has been married to television producer Morgan Langley since June 2007.

== Filmography ==
=== Film ===
Year	Title	Role	Notes
1996	Dog Watch	Naomi	
2000	Cherry Falls	Cindy	
2001	Swimming Pool	Sarah	
2002	Man of the Year	Sally	
2002	Reality Check	April	
2003	No Place Like Home	April	
2004	Team America: World Police	Lisa	Voice role
2005	The Fallen Ones	Angela	
2005	Single White Female 2: The Psycho	Holly Parker	Direct-to-video film
2006	All In	Katie	
2006	Puff, Puff, Pass	Aimee	
2011	The Dog Who Saved Halloween	Monique	
2012	Life's a Beach	Renee	
2014	A Christmas Mystery	Mary Walker	
2015	Meet My Valentine	Brynn	
2017	Eliza Sherman's Revenge	Rachel Fowler	

=== Television ===
Year	Title	Role	Notes
1995	Saved by the Bell: The New Class	Robin	Episode: "The Christmas Gift"
1996	Hope and Gloria	Young Pennsylvanian	Episode: "Sit Down, You're Rockin' the Funicular"
1996	Malibu Shores	Martha Lewis	Main role
1997–1999	USA High	Ashley Elliot	Main role
1999–2000	Malibu, CA	Holly / Stacie	Episodes: "The Dude of Love", "Three Dudes and a Baby"
2000	Son of the Beach	Hottie McDaniel	Episode: "Silence of the Clams"
2000	City Guys	Sarah	Episode: "Kodak Moment"
2001	That's My Bush!	Princess Stevenson	Main role
2001	Men, Women & Dogs	Sarah	Episode: "The Magic Three-Legged Sex Dog"
2001	Off Centre	Ginger	Episode: "Euan's Brush with Love"
2002–2004	She Spies	Deedra "D.D." Cummings	Main role
2004	Charmed	Lady Godiva	Episode: "The Bare Witch Project"
2005	Two and a Half Men	Debbie	Episode: "Woo-Hoo, a Hernia Exam!"
2005	Joey	Jenna	Episodes: "Joey and the Big Break: Parts 1 & 2"
2005	Hot Properties	Clerk	Episode: "When Chloe Met Marco"
2005	Out of Practice	Sharon	Episode: "Thanks"
2007	I Hate My 30's	Jenny	Episode: "Always a Bridesmaid to Order"
2008	Las Vegas	Sherri	Episode: "I Could Eat a Horse"
2009	90210	Lucinda Tunick	Episode: "By Accident"
2011	Dexter	Trisha Billings	Episode: "Those Kinds of Things"
2012	Mad Men	Olive Frank	Episode: "Far Away Places"
2012	Castle	Caroline	Episode: "Swan Song"
2012	Wedding Band	Tina	Episode: "Don't Forget About Me"
2013	The Glades	Lisa Schultz	Episode: "Magic Longworth"
2019–2020	Gods of Medicine	Michelle Thompson	3 episodes

=== Web ===
Year	Title	Role	Notes
2013–2014	Jon and Jen Are Married	Constance	Main role
2014–2015	Work in Progress	Chloe Grey	Main role
