= Rysher Entertainment =

American film and television production company and distributor

- Final logo
- Type: Subsidiary
- Industry: Film production; Television syndication and production
- Predecessors: Bing Crosby Productions; Television Program Enterprises
- Founded: 1991; 35 years ago
- Founder: Keith Samples
- Defunct: 1999; 27 years ago
- Fate: Shut down by Cox Broadcasting; assets acquired by Vine Alternative Investments
- Successor: Company: Vine Alternative Investments; Library: Paramount Pictures (film library with the exception of The Opposite of Sex, retained by Sony Pictures Classics); CBS Media Ventures (television arm)
- Headquarters: Santa Monica, California, United States
- Parent: Cox Enterprises (1993–1999)

Rysher Entertainment was an American film and television production company and distributor founded in 1991. In 1993, Rysher Entertainment was acquired by Cox Enterprises and subsequently closed in 1999. That same year, Viacom entered into an agreement with Cox Enterprises for distribution rights to the Rysher library, which currently lie with Viacom's successor, Skydance Corporation – specifically its subsidiaries Paramount Pictures and CBS Media Ventures. Ownership of the company's assets changed hands multiple times over the 2000s before finally being acquired by Vine Alternative Investments in 2011.

== History ==
Keith Samples established the company in April 1991, as an independent company, whose sole product had been the distribution of the series Saved by the Bell (at the time, NBC could not distribute it in syndication due to fin-syn rules). Encouraged by the success, it made its second move with their first foray into animation, Captain N and the Video Game Masters, the off-net syndicated version of the DIC Entertainment series that also aired on NBC, Captain N: The Game Master. Also that year, it attempted to merge with film and television production company The Kushner-Locke Company, only for the deal to be aborted.

Also that year, Cox Enterprises was in discussions to purchase the studio and helped them merge with TPE. It was considered that later that year that Gay Rosenthal was inking a deal with the studio to distribute their own projects and it merged with TPE. However, the Cox/Rysher merger was finalized, and soon afterwards, Rysher merged with Al Masini's Television Program Enterprises to form Rysher TPE, its alternate name used from 1993 to 1994, and helped them to syndicate California Dreams, with Keith Samples remaining at the helm.

Through it, they produced and distributed shows, such as Lifestyles of the Rich and Famous (renamed Lifestyles with Robin Leach and Shari Belafonte for the final season) and Star Search. Later, they produced and distributed George & Alana. The company branched out into feature films, and in the span of three years had produced over two dozen. In late 1993, Beverly Hills 90210 star Gabrielle Carteris, through GABCO Productions struck a deal with Rysher TPE for a production/distribution agreement.

In May 1995, Rysher entered into a five-film domestic distribution arrangement with Metro-Goldwyn-Mayer (MGM). The company closed the film unit due to underperforming box-office sales in July 1997. Later that year, in 1997, Papazian-Hrsch Entertainment struck a deal with Rysher to develop their television projects.

In 1998, Rysher collaborated with HBO to distribute some of the series outside of the United States, including Arli$$, Oz and Sex and the City. The company was closed in 1999 after Viacom entered an agreement with Cox Enterprises, allowing Paramount Pictures and its television unit to handle distribution rights. The company's library is incorporated into CBS Media Ventures for television series and Paramount Pictures for films (except The Opposite of Sex). The company's films and series included Hogan's Heroes (whose partial rights are held by CBS), Ben Casey, Walking Tall, Nash Bridges (continued by Paramount Network Television), Highlander: The Series, Kingpin, and Big Night. In 1998, Rysher and CBS Productions jointly purchased the Ann-Margret CBS drama Four Corners from Columbia TriStar Television.

The company's assets were acquired by 2929 Entertainment in 2001. They were bought by Qualia Capital, LLC. in 2006, and were merged with Gaylord Films and Pandora Entertainment. The combined entity became known as Qualia Libraries Co. and the brand name served as a limited partnership, and now owns the trademark to Hogan's Heroes. In 2011, Qualia Libraries Co. was acquired by affiliates of Vine Alternative Investments. Viacom merged with CBS Corporation, under the name ViacomCBS (later Paramount Global and currently known as Paramount Skydance Corporation), as a single distribution company in December. CBS Media Ventures currently distributes Rysher's television library, while the distribution rights to the film library lie with Paramount Pictures, with Trifecta Entertainment handling North American broadcast television rights.

== Feature films ==
Release date	Title	Co-producer	Distributor
April 28, 1995	Destiny Turns on the Radio		Savoy Pictures
October 27, 1995	Three Wishes		Savoy Pictures
November 17, 1995	It Takes Two	Dualstar Productions	Warner Bros. Pictures
January 20, 1996	Hard Eight	Green Parrot	The Samuel Goldwyn Company
April 3, 1996	Primal Fear		Paramount Pictures
July 26, 1996	Kingpin	Motion Picture Corporation of America	Metro-Goldwyn-Mayer
August 9, 1996	Escape from L.A.		Paramount Pictures
August 7, 1996	House Arrest		Metro-Goldwyn-Mayer
August 23, 1996	Foxfire	Chestnut Hills Productions/Red Mullet Productions	The Samuel Goldwyn Company
September 26, 1996	Big Night	Timpano Productions	The Samuel Goldwyn Company
September 27, 1996	2 Days in the Valley		Metro-Goldwyn-Mayer
November 1, 1996	Dear God		Paramount Pictures
December 25, 1996	The Evening Star		Paramount Pictures
January 10, 1997	Turbulence		Metro-Goldwyn-Mayer
January 24, 1997	Zeus and Roxanne		Metro-Goldwyn-Mayer
March 7, 1997	Private Parts		Paramount Pictures
April 4, 1997	The Saint	Mace Neufeld Productions	Paramount Pictures
August 22, 1997	A Smile Like Yours		Paramount Pictures
October 3, 1997	Kiss the Girls		Paramount Pictures
October 31, 1997	Switchback	Pacific Western Productions	Paramount Pictures
December 6, 1997	The Eighteenth Angel		Comstock (Japan, theatrical); 20th Century Fox/Columbia TriStar (home video)
May 22, 1998	The Opposite of Sex		Sony Pictures Classics
Unreleased	Let It Be Me		Savoy Pictures
