= Keith Samples =

American filmmaker (born 1955 or 1956)

- Born: 1955 or 1956 (age 69–70)
- Occupation: Filmmaker
- Years active: 1975–present
- Employer: Rysher Entertainment (1991-1999)
- Style: Comedy; Fantasy; Thriller; Action; Adventure

Keith Samples (born 1955 or 1956) is an American filmmaker and former syndication executive.

He graduated in 1977 at the Texas Tech University and pursued a sports career.

He was founder of the film and television production company Rysher Entertainment. He was originally senior vice president of Lorimar-Telepictures, before landing a job at Warner Bros. Television and Walt Disney Television to help them develop projects for syndication.

During his time at Rysher Entertainment, he grew the company by developing their own movie projects. On May 27, 1997, he resigned from Rysher Entertainment to pursue his own projects. He went on to be a movie maker/television director/producer after leaving Rysher, starting his own production company to develop motion pictures and television shows.

For a short period of time, in 2008, he worked at Media Rights Capital's television division. He developed The CW's own Sunday night programming block under a time-lease agreement, but it flopped after a few viewings and poor ratings. He was fired after only a few months working at MRC.

== Filmography ==
=== Film and Short Film ===
- Above Suspicion (1995)
- Big Night (1996)
- A Smile Like Yours (1997)
- Switchback (1997)
- Election (1999)
- Walking Tall (2004)
- Single White Female 2: The Psycho (2005)
- The Death and Life of Bobby Z (2007)
- Love Lies Bleeding (2008)

=== Television ===
- Everwood
- Felicity
- Freddy's Nightmares
- Haven
- The O.C.
- One Tree Hill
- Oz
- The Practice
