= A Smile Like Yours =

- Theatrical release poster
- Directed by: Keith Samples
- Written by: Kevin Meyer; Keith Samples
- Produced by: Tony Amatullo; David Kirkpatrick
- Starring: Greg Kinnear; Lauren Holly; Joan Cusack; Jay Thomas; Jill Hennessy; Sheridan Samples; Christopher McDonald
- Cinematography: Richard Bowen
- Edited by: Wayne Wahrman
- Music by: William Ross
- Production company: Rysher Entertainment
- Distributed by: Paramount Pictures
- Release date: August 22, 1997
- Running time: 98 minutes
- Country: United States
- Language: English
- Budget: $18 million
- Box office: $3,330,352

A Smile Like Yours is a 1997 American romantic comedy film directed by Keith Samples and starring Greg Kinnear and Lauren Holly. The film centers on a couple as they try to conceive a child. The film was produced by Rysher Entertainment and released by Paramount Pictures on August 22, 1997 to negative reviews from critics. The film was a box office bomb, grossing $3,330,352 against an $18 million budget. The title song was performed by Natalie Cole.

== Plot ==
Danny Robertson and his wife Jennifer are happily married, except for one major issue: he is doubtful about having children, and she desperately wants to have a baby. Jennifer stops using birth control and does not inform Danny, straining their relationship, particularly after she discovers that they have fertility problems. Danny and Jennifer are tempted to stray from their marriage as their conception woes mount.

== Cast ==
- Greg Kinnear as Danny Robertson
- Lauren Holly as Jennifer Robertson
- Joan Cusack as Nancy Tellen
- Jay Thomas as Steve Harris
- Jill Hennessy as Lindsay Hamilton
- Christopher McDonald as Richard Halstrom
- Donald Moffat as Dr. Felber
- Shirley MacLaine (uncredited) as Martha

== Reception ==
A Smile Like Yours was generally panned by critics. Review aggregate Rotten Tomatoes gave it a 6% approval rating based on 35 reviews, with an average score of 3.2/10. The site's critical consensus reads: "Flat and unfocused, A Smile Like Yours aims for romantic comedy but settles for tired sitcom formula."

John Hartl of The Seattle Times criticized Samples for his direction and scripting of both his cast and comedic scenes coming across as flat and unfunny, saying that he "systematically takes each comic opportunity and drains the laughs out of it." Lisa Alspector of the Chicago Reader felt that both Kinnear and Holly's characters were written to have charm and display "every clichéd behaviors" about their problems in a film that acts as an "incredibly naive attempt at schmaltz." Dave Kehr, writing for the New York Daily News, said that despite both Kinnear and Hennessy's best efforts with the material given, the film suffers from "witless sex jokes", melodramatic tonal changes and lacking the sweetness found in the comedy Barefoot in the Park. Conversely, Kevin Thomas from the Los Angeles Times gave praise to the cast for their performances and both director Samples and co-writer Meyer for adding wit and "affectionate humor" to the film's infertility plot, despite having an unfulfilling conclusion, calling it "an uncommonly thoughtful and intelligent mainstream entertainment, painstaking and stylish in every aspect." Holly was nominated for a Golden Raspberry Award for Worst Actress for her work in the film and Turbulence, but lost the award to Demi Moore for G.I. Jane.
