= Team America: World Police =

2004 comedy film

- Theatrical release poster
- Directed by: Trey Parker
- Written by: Trey Parker; Matt Stone; Pam Brady
- Produced by: Scott Rudin; Trey Parker; Matt Stone
- Starring: Trey Parker; Matt Stone; Kristen Miller; Masasa Moyo; Daran Norris; Phil Hendrie; Maurice LaMarche; Chelsea Marguerite; Jeremy Shada; Fred Tatasciore
- Cinematography: Bill Pope
- Edited by: Thomas M. Vogt
- Music by: Harry Gregson-Williams
- Production company: Scott Rudin Productions
- Distributed by: Paramount Pictures
- Release dates: October 11, 2004 (Grauman's Chinese Theater); October 15, 2004 (United States)
- Running time: 98 minutes
- Country: United States
- Language: English
- Budget: $32 million
- Box office: $50.8 million

Team America: World Police is a 2004 American puppet comedy film directed by Trey Parker, who co-wrote it with Matt Stone and Pam Brady. Parker and Stone also star alongside Kristen Miller, Masasa Moyo, Daran Norris, Phil Hendrie, Maurice LaMarche, Jeremy Shada, and Fred Tatasciore. A satire of action film archetypes, American militarism, and the foreign policy of the United States, the film follows the eponymous international counterterrorism force, which recruits a Broadway actor to assist in saving the world from Kim Jong Il and his coalition of Islamic terrorists and progressive Hollywood actors.

The film intertwines puppetry and miniature effects in a manner similar to Supermarionation, known for its use in the television series Thunderbirds, although Stone and Parker were not fans of that show. They worked on the script with Brady, a former South Park writer, for nearly two years. Production took place from May to September of 2004 and was troubled, with various technical problems regarding the puppets and the scheduling extremes of finishing in time for its theatrical release. Like Parker's previous film South Park: Bigger, Longer & Uncut, it also came into routine conflict with the Motion Picture Association of America, which returned the film multiple times with an NC-17 rating, particularly due to an explicit sex scene involving puppets.

Team America: World Police premiered at the Grauman's Chinese Theatre in Los Angeles on October 11, 2004, and was released in the United States on October 15 by Paramount Pictures. The film received generally positive reviews from critics and grossed over $50 million worldwide on a $32 million budget.

== Plot ==
Team America, an international organization dedicated to counterterrorism, defeats a group of Islamic terrorists in Paris, but are very reckless and destroy the Eiffel Tower, Arc de Triomphe, and the Louvre in the process. The team includes Lisa, an idealistic psychologist; her love interest, Carson; Sarah, a psychic; Joe, a jock who is in love with Sarah; and Chris, a martial arts expert who harbours a grudge towards actors. Carson proposes to Lisa, but a terrorist kills him in the middle of the act.

Team America leader Spottswoode brings Broadway actor Gary Johnston to Team America's base in Mount Rushmore and asks him to use his acting skills to infiltrate a terrorist cell. Unbeknownst to the team, North Korean dictator Kim Jong Il is supplying terrorists across the globe with WMDs. Gary infiltrates a terrorist group in Cairo. The team is discovered and a chase ensues, ending with Team America killing the terrorists. However, Cairo is left in ruins, drawing criticism and outrage from the Film Actors Guild (F.A.G.), a union of progressive Hollywood actors led by Alec Baldwin.

At Mount Rushmore, Gary tells Lisa that as a child, his acting talent caused his older brother, Tommy, to be brutally killed by gorillas. While the two grow close and have sex, terrorists blow up the Panama Canal in retaliation for the Team America operation in Cairo, killing thousands. The F.A.G. blame this on Team America, while Kim chastises the terrorists for detonating one bomb too early. Gary, feeling his acting talents have again resulted in innocent people dying, resigns from Team America. The remaining members depart for the Middle East and North Africa, but are defeated and captured by North Korean forces while Michael Moore blows up Team America's base in a suicide attack. In North Korea, Kim invites the F.A.G. and world leaders to a peace ceremony, planning to detonate several bombs around the world while they are distracted.

Succumbing to depression, Gary is reminded of his responsibility by a rambling speech about "dicks, pussies and assholes" from a drunken tramp. Returning to the team's base, he finds Spottswoode has survived Moore's bombing. After regaining Spottswoode's trust by giving him a blowjob and undergoing one day of training, Gary goes to North Korea, where he uses his acting skills to infiltrate the base and free the team, although Lisa is held hostage by Kim. The team is confronted by the F.A.G. and kill most of their members in an ensuing fight. After Gary uses his acting skills to save Chris from Susan Sarandon, Chris confesses to Gary that the reason he dislikes actors is that he was raped by the cast of the musical Cats when he was 19 years old.

The team crashes the peace ceremony, and Gary goes on stage to deliver a recontextualized version of the tramp's speech, arguing that "dicks", though criticized by "pussies", are necessary to stop "assholes", which convinces the world's leaders to unite. Kim betrays and kills Baldwin for being unable to counter Gary's argument, but he is kicked over a balcony by Lisa and impaled on a German delegate's Pickelhaube. Kim reveals his true form as an extraterrestrial cockroach and flees in a spaceship, vowing to return. Gary and Lisa happily begin a relationship and, in the end, the team reunites, preparing to fight the world's terrorists once again.

== Voice cast ==
- Trey Parker as Gary Johnston/Joe Smith/Carson/Kim Jong Il/Hans Blix/Osama bin Laden/Matt Damon/Tim Robbins/Sean Penn/Michael Moore/Helen Hunt/Peter Jennings/Susan Sarandon/Drunk in Bar/Liv Tyler/Janeane Garofalo/Additional voices
- Matt Stone as Chris Roth/George Clooney/Danny Glover/Ethan Hawke/Martin Sheen/Additional voices
- Kristen Miller as Lisa Jones
- Masasa Moyo as Sarah Wong
- Daran Norris as Spottswoode
- Phil Hendrie as I.N.T.E.L.L.I.G.E.N.C.E./Chechen terrorist
- Maurice LaMarche as Alec Baldwin/Ben Affleck (Deleted Scene)
- Chelsea Marguerite as a French mother
- Jeremy Shada as Jean Francois
- Fred Tatasciore as Samuel L. Jackson
- Greg Ballora, Scott Land, Seb Hartman, and Tony Urbano as Lead puppeteers

The film also features a man dressed as a giant statue of Kim Il Sung, two black cats who pose as panthers, two nurse sharks, and a cockroach, with the difference in size with the marionettes played for humorous effect. A poster of the Barbi Twins was featured on the billboard in Times Square, making the Twins the only non-marionette humans in the film.

== Production ==
=== Development ===
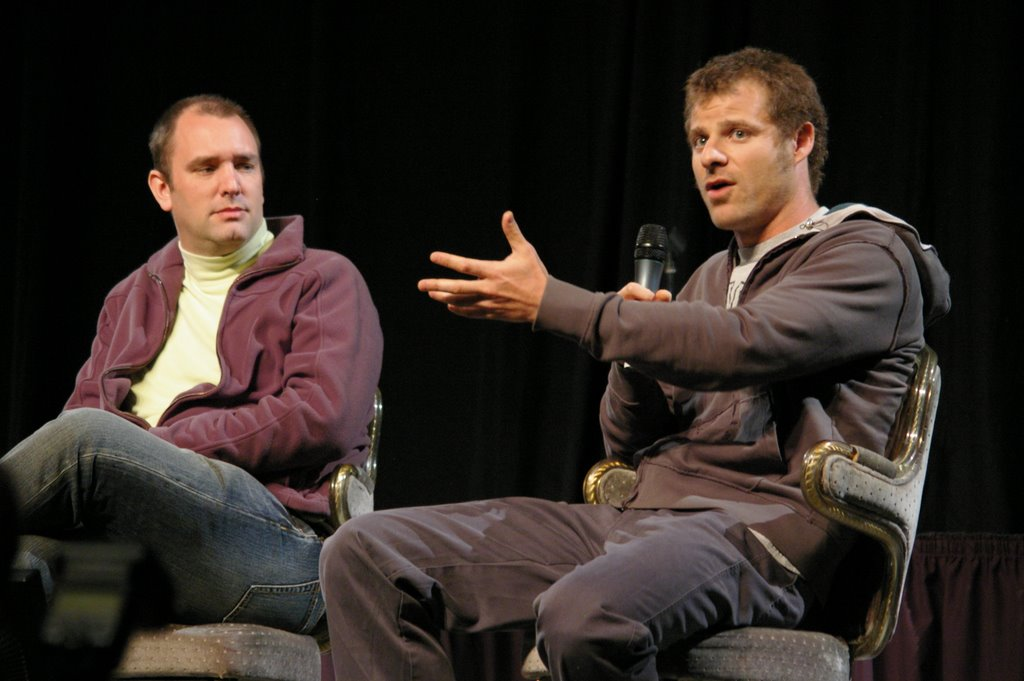
Creators Trey Parker (left) and Matt Stone (right) were exhausted with production on Team America and its scheduling extremes.

The film's origins involve Trey Parker and Matt Stone watching Gerry and Sylvia Anderson's puppet series Thunderbirds on television while bored. Parker said that the series was unable to hold his interest as a child because "the dialogue was so expository and slow, and it took itself really seriously". The duo inquired about the film rights to the series and found out that Universal Pictures was producing a Thunderbirds film directed by Jonathan Frakes. According to Parker, "We said, 'What? Jonathan Frakes is directing puppets?' and then we found out it was a live-action version, and we were disappointed." On October 17, 2002, news broke of the duo signing on to make the film, with Stone revealing that it would be a homage to Anderson. The film was officially announced by Variety in June 2003, with Stone saying "What we wanted was to do a send-up of these super important huge action movies that Jerry Bruckheimer makes."

Before production began, Team America was championed at Paramount Pictures by Scott Rudin, who had been the executive producer for Parker and Stone's previous film, South Park: Bigger, Longer & Uncut. After the "hassle" of producing the South Park film, Parker and Stone had vowed never to create another film. Other studio executives were initially unenthusiastic about the project: the studio was in favor of the film's lack of political correctness, but were confused by the use of puppets. The executives explained that they could not make profit from an R-rated puppet feature, and Parker countered that similar things had been said about the South Park film, an R-rated animated musical which had become a box-office hit. Tom Freston, who was co-president of Paramount's parent company at the time, Viacom, also supported the film, feeling that Paramount should make more lower-budget films that appeal to children and young adults after the studio's failures with adult-oriented films such as The Stepford Wives. According to Parker and Stone, executives were finally won over after they saw the dailies from the film's production.

=== Writing ===
Parker, Stone, and longtime writing partner Pam Brady spent nearly two years perfecting the Team America script. For influences, they studied scores of popular action and disaster films, such as Alien, Top Gun and S.W.A.T. The duo watched Pearl Harbor to get the nuances of the puppets just right when they were staring at each other, and also used Ben Affleck as a model. To help shape the film's archetypal heroes (from the true believer to the reluctant hero to the guy who sells out his friends for greater glory), they read the books of Joseph Campbell. "On one level, it's a big send-up," Brady said. "But on another, it's about foreign policy". The first draft of the script was turned in well before the Iraq War. The film takes aim at various celebrities, many of whom came out in opposition to the Iraq War in 2003. Brady explained that the film's treatment of celebrities was derived from her annoyance at the screen time given to celebrities in the beginning of the Iraq War, in lieu of foreign policy experts.

=== Filming ===
The film's central concept was easier to conceive than to execute. Team America was produced using a crew of about 200 people, which sometimes required four people at a time to manipulate a marionette. Due to the limited nature of the puppets, the duo were forced to constantly rewrite the film during production. The 270 puppet characters were created by the Chiodo Brothers, who previously designed puppets for films such as Elf and Dinosaur. The costumers of the crew were responsible for making sure the over 1,000 costumes remained in cohesive order and were realistic.

Filming began on May 23, 2004. The project was interrupted multiple times early on in production. As soon as filming began, Parker and Stone labored to find the right comic tone; the original script for the film contained many more jokes. After shooting the very first scene, the two realized the jokes were not working, and that the humor instead came from the marionettes. "Puppets doing jokes is not funny," Stone found. "But when you see puppets doing melodrama, spitting up blood and talking about how they were raped as children, that's funny." Filming was done by three units shooting different parts at the same time. Occasionally, the producers had up to five cameras set up to capture the scene. The film was mainly based on the 1982 cult classic action film Megaforce, of which Parker and Stone had been fans. Many ideas had been copied such as the flying motorcycle sequence.

The film was painstakingly made realistic, which led to various shots being re-done throughout the process due to Parker and Stone's obsession with detail and craftsmanship. For example, a tiny Uzi cost $1,000 to construct, and Kim Jong Il's eyeglasses were made with hand-ground prescription lenses. Although the filmmakers hired three dozen marionette operators, simple performances from the marionettes were nearly impossible, with a simple shot of a character drinking taking a half-day to complete successfully. Parker and Stone agreed during production of Team America that it was "the hardest thing [they'd] ever done."

Rather than rely on computer-generated special effects added in post-production, the filmmakers vied to capture every stunt live on film. Parker likened each shot to a complicated math problem. The late September 2004 deadline for the film's completion took a toll on both filmmakers, as did various difficulties in working with puppets, with Stone, who described the film as "the worst time of [my] life," resorting to coffee to work 20-hour days, and sleeping pills to go to bed. The film was barely completed in time for its October 15 release date. At a press junket in Los Angeles on October 5, journalists were only shown a 20-minute reel of highlights because there was no finished print. Many of the film's producers had not seen the entire film with the sound mix until the premiere.

=== Editing ===
"It's a back-and-forth with the board. They said it can't be as many positions, so we cut out a couple of them. We love the golden shower, but I guess they said no to that. But I just love that they have to watch it. Seriously, can you imagine getting a videotape with just a close-up of a puppet asshole, and you have to watch it?"

— Trey Parker on the clashes between him and Stone and the MPAA

Even before the scene's submission to the Motion Picture Association of America, Parker planned to "have fun" pushing the limits by throwing in a graphic sex scene. The duo knew the racy film would be met with some opposition, but were outraged when the film came back with their harshest rating, NC-17. The original cut's minute-and-a-half sex scene with Gary and Lisa was cut down to 50 seconds. The original scene also featured the two puppets urinating and defecating on one another, which was based on what children do humorously with dolls such as Barbie and Ken. At least nine edits of the puppet love scene were shown to the MPAA before the board accepted that it had been toned down enough to qualify for an R rating. Parker contrasted the MPAA's reluctance for the sex scene to their acceptance of the violence: "Meanwhile, we're taking other puppets and, you know, blowing their heads off, they're covered with blood and stuff, and the MPAA didn't have a word to say about that." In addition to the sex scene, the MPAA also objected to the scene in which the Hans Blix puppet is eaten by sharks. Stone and Parker had faced a similar conflict with their previous film South Park: Bigger, Longer & Uncut in 1999.

=== Music ===
Harry Gregson-Williams – "Team America March"
Main theme of the 2004 film Team America: World Police.

The film's score was composed and conducted by Harry Gregson-Williams. The soundtrack also contains "Magic Carpet Ride" performed by Steppenwolf, "Battle Without Honor or Humanity" performed by Tomoyasu Hotei, "Forbidden Bitter-Melon Dance" performed by Jeff Faustman, "Bu Dünyada Aşkından Ölmek" performed by Kubat, and songs by Trey Parker including "Everyone Has AIDS", "Freedom Isn't Free", "America, Fuck Yeah", "Derka Derk (Terrorist Theme)", "Only a Woman", "I'm So Ronery", "The End of an Act" and "Montage" and "North Korean Melody". Marc Shaiman, who previously scored Parker's South Park: Bigger, Longer & Uncut originally composed the film's score, but was replaced by Gregson-Williams.

== Individuals parodied in the film ==
Famous people depicted as puppets, and lampooned, in the film include Michael Moore, Alec Baldwin, Sean Penn, Tim Robbins, Helen Hunt, George Clooney, Liv Tyler, Martin Sheen, Susan Sarandon, Janeane Garofalo, Matt Damon, Samuel L. Jackson, Danny Glover, Ethan Hawke, Kim Jong Il, Muammar Gaddafi, Tony Blair, Queen Elizabeth II, Qaboos bin Said, Fidel Castro, Peter Jennings and Hans Blix. Almost all of them are killed in gory and violent ways.

Reactions from those parodied were mixed; Baldwin found the project "so funny", and expressed interest in lending his voice to his character. In a 2008 video interview with Time, Baldwin related how his daughter Ireland's classmates would recite Kim Jong Il's line to him, "You are worthress, Arec Barrwin." [sic] Sean Penn, who is portrayed making outlandish claims about how happy and utopian Iraq was before Team America showed up, sent Parker and Stone an angry letter inviting them to tour Iraq with him, ending with the words "fuck you".

Both George Clooney and Matt Damon are said to be friends with Stone and Parker, and Clooney has stated that he would have been insulted had he not been included in the film. Damon is portrayed as a simpleton who can only say his own name. When asked about the film in 2016, Damon stated that he was confused by the portrayal:

[…] I was always kind of bewildered by Team America, I think because it's hard for us to understand what our images are in public, I think we're not good judges of that, and when I saw myself on screen just only able to say my own name and not really that well, I kind of wondered "Wow, is that how people perceive me?" At that point I just kind of was like, I'm a screenwriter and an actor, and like really? I can barely say my own name? So I was always bewildered by that, and I never talked to Trey and Matt about that. And incidentally, I believe those two are geniuses, and I don't use that word lightly. I think they are absolute geniuses, and what they've done is awesome and I'm a big fan of theirs, but I never quite understood that one. But I will say this. Those of us who were parodied in that video were parodied because we were against the Iraq war, and we went on the record against that war, and so history is on my side not theirs.

Stone and Parker had earlier stated in an interview that they were inspired to give the Damon character that personality only after seeing the puppet that was made for him, which "looked kind of mentally deficient".

Kim Jong Il, a noted film buff, never commented publicly about his depiction in Team America: World Police, although shortly after its release, North Korea asked the Czech Republic to ban the film. The country refused, calling the request an "effort to undermine the Czech Republic's post-Communist-era freedom". The filmmakers acknowledged this in a DVD extra and jokingly suggested he sings "I'm So Ronery". Michael Moore is depicted as a fat, hot dog-eating glutton who partakes in suicide bombing and is referred to as a "giant socialist weasel" by I.N.T.E.L.L.I.G.E.N.C.E. Stone explained the reason for this portrayal in an MSNBC interview:

We have a very specific beef with Michael Moore, […] I did an interview, and he didn't mischaracterize me or anything I said [in Bowling for Columbine]. But what he did do was put this cartoon [titled "A Brief History of the United States of America", written by Moore, animated and directed by Harold Moss] right after me that made it look like we did that cartoon.

A deleted scene also shows Meryl Streep and Ben Affleck (who is portrayed with a real-life hand replacing his head).

== Release ==
The world premiere of Team America: World Police took place on October 14, 2004, as the opening day event for the first day of the Denver Film Festival's Grand Opening celebration. Paramount Pictures released the film in the United States on October 15, 2004.

=== Home media ===
The film was released on DVD and VHS in the United States on May 17, 2005 by Paramount Home Entertainment, available in both R-rated and unrated versions. The film was released on Blu-ray Disc on August 1, 2017 in the United States.

A 2-Disc Blu-ray edition was released on July 25, 2023 by Shout! Factory.

On June 25, 2024, Paramount Home Entertainment released the film for the first time on Ultra HD Blu-ray combined with the Blu-ray release in a "20th Anniversary Limited Edition Release".

== Reception ==
=== Critical response ===
On Rotten Tomatoes, Team America: World Police has a 77% based on 198 reviews and an average score of 7.00/10. The site's consensus states, "Team America will either offend you or leave you in stitches. It'll probably do both." On Metacritic the film has a score of 64 out of 100 based on reviews from 38 critics, indicating "generally favorable reviews". Audiences surveyed by CinemaScore gave the film a "B" grade on an A+-to-F scale.

Peter Travers of Rolling Stone praised the film as "A ruthlessly clever musical, a punchy political parody and the hottest look ever at naked puppets." Kirk Honeycutt of The Hollywood Reporter wrote: "Team America: World Police is to political commentary what lap dancing is to ballet. There is no room for subtlety. Aiming a rude, foul-mouthed political satire everywhere – left, right and center – Trey Parker and Matt Stone blow up a good deal of the world, not to mention the egos of many Hollywood personalities." Brian Lowry of Variety was positive about the satire, saying the film "goes the extra mile to piss off everybody – which includes gleefully destroying renowned Hollywood liberals, literally and figuratively" but less positive about other aspects of the film: "All told, the clever visual bits and hilarious songs don't entirely compensate for the many flat or beyond-over-the-top spells." Lowry praised the songs, saying they "deliver the movie's biggest highlights," and he also praised the production design, calling it a "true technical achievement, recreating a dizzying array of sets and costumes at one-third scale and clearly having plenty of fun doing so – down to using housecats as stand-ins for terrifying panthers." Richard Corliss of Time also highlighted the production, saying, "The real kick [...] is in the grandeur and detail of the production design by Jim Dultz and David Rockwell."

Kim Newman of Empire called it "a patchy comedy that's stronger as a genre-mocker than a political satire." Roger Ebert gave the film 1 out of 4 stars and wrote: "I wasn't offended by the movie's content so much as by its nihilism", and was critical of the film's "sneer at both sides" approach, comparing it to "a cocky teenager who's had a couple of drinks before the party, they don't have a plan for who they want to offend, only an intention to be as offensive as possible."

Contemporary and retrospective comment on the film has observed that it takes aim at militarism in the United States and Hollywood liberals' response. David Edelstein, in a review for Slate, called the film "a stink bomb lobbed at American arrogance and overweening militarism." In The Village Voice, Michael Atkinson wrote "Madly Rorschachian, [Team America] appears to rub its shitty boots on U.S. militarism as well as Hollywood liberals".

National Review Online named the film #24 in its list of "The Best Conservative Movies". Brian C. Anderson wrote, "the film's utter disgust with air-headed, left-wing celebrity activism remains unmatched in popular culture." Political and social commentator Andrew Sullivan considers the film brilliant in its skewering of both the left and right's approach on terrorism. Sullivan (a fan of Stone and Parker's other work, as well) popularized the term "South Park Republican" to describe himself and other like-minded fiscal conservatives/social libertarians. Parker himself is a registered Libertarian. Before the film's release, it was criticized by Matt Drudge and conservative group Move America Forward for mocking the war on terror.

Before Team America was released, statements were released by a "senior Bush administration official" condemning the film. Upon receiving the news, the duo called and found it was instead a "junior staffer", causing Stone to quip, "What is it – junior or senior? What are we talking about here? Who knows? It might have been the janitor." The two eventually decided it was free publicity, with which they were fine. Some media outlets interpreted the film's release on October 15 to be in theaters before the November elections. Parker said the release date had nothing to do with the elections, and the date was pushed back as far as possible due to production delays, but they had to return to South Park by October 20. Thunderbirds creator Gerry Anderson was supposed to have met Parker before production, but they cancelled the meeting, acknowledging he would not like the film's expletives. Anderson saw the completed film and felt "there are good, fun parts [in the film] but the language wasn't to my liking."

=== Box office ===
Team America earned $12,120,358 in its opening U.S. weekend, ranking number three behind Shark Tale and Friday Night Lights. The film eventually grossed a total of $50,946,640, with $32,886,074 in U.S. domestic receipts and $18,160,566 in international proceeds.

=== Filmmakers' response ===
In an interview with Matt Stone following the film's release, Anwar Brett of the BBC asked, "For all the targets you choose to take pot-shots at, George W. Bush isn't one of them. How come?" Stone replied, "If you want to see Bush-bashing in America you only have to walk about 10 feet to find it. Trey and I are always attracted to what other people aren't doing. Frankly that wasn't the movie we wanted to make." In another interview, Parker and Stone further clarified the meaning of the film's ending, which tries to justify the role of the United States as the "world police":

Because that's the thing that we realized when we were making the movie. It was always the hardest thing. We wanted to deal with this emotion of being hated as an American. That was the thing that was intriguing to us, and having Gary the main character deal with that emotion. And so, him becoming ashamed to be a part of Team America and being ashamed of himself, he comes to realize that, just as he got his brother killed by gorillas – he didn't kill his brother; he was a dick, he wasn't an asshole – so too does America have this role in the world as a dick. Cops are dicks, you fucking hate cops, but you need 'em.

=== Accolades ===
In a worldwide survey of comedians by The Guardian, the film was included on a list of the fifty funniest films. In 2010, The Guardian listed the film as the 4th greatest comedy film of all time. In 2019, The Guardian ranked the film tenth on its list of 100 best films of the 21st century. Director Quentin Tarantino counted Team America: World Police in his list of top 20 films released since 1992, and director Edgar Wright named it as one of his 1,000 favorite films.

Award	Category	Nominee	Result
Empire Award	Best Comedy	Team America: World Police	Won
Golden Schmoes	Best Comedy of the Year; Best Music in a Movie; Most Memorable Scene in a Movie	Team America: World Police	Nominated
Golden Trailer	Best Comedy	Team America: World Police	Nominated
IFMCA Award	Best Original Score for a Comedy Film	Harry Gregson-Williams	Nominated
Golden Reel Award	Best Sound Editing in Feature Film – Animated	Bruce Howell (supervising sound editor); Beth Sterner (supervising sound editor); Thomas W. Small (supervising foley editor); Lydia Quidilla (supervising dialogue editor); Robert Ulrich (supervising adr editor); Chuck Michael (sound effects editor); Peter Zinda (sound effects editor); Jon Title (sound effects editor); Michael Kamper (sound effects editor); Doug Jackson (sound effects editor); Cary Butler (sound effects editor/dialogue editor); Fred Burke (foley editor); Scott Curtis (foley editor); Nic Ratner (music editor)	Nominated
MTV Movie Award	Best Action Sequence	Team America: World Police	Nominated
OFCS Award	Best Animated Feature	Team America: World Police	Nominated
People's Choice Award	Favorite Animated Movie	Team America: World Police	Nominated
Golden Satellite Award	Best Motion Picture, Animated or Mixed Media	Team America: World Police	Nominated
Teen Choice Award	Choice Movie: Animated/Computer Generated	Team America: World Police	Nominated

== Soundtrack ==
The film's soundtrack was released on October 19, 2004, and on CD on January 10, 2005, by Atlantic Records.

All songs are written and performed by Trey Parker, except where indicated.

No.	Title	Writer(s)	Artist	Length
1.	"Everyone Has AIDS"	Trey Parker; Marc Shaiman		1:15
2.	"Freedom Isn't Free"			2:36
3.	"America, Fuck Yeah"			2:07
4.	"Derka Derk (Terrorist Theme)"			0:47
5.	"Only a Woman"			2:56
6.	"I'm So Ronery"			1:55
7.	"America, Fuck Yeah (Bummer Remix)"			0:55
8.	"The End of an Act"			2:20
9.	"Montage"			2:03
10.	"North Korea Melody"			1:45
11.	"The Team America March"	Stephen Barton; Harry Gregson-Williams; James McKee Smith	Harry Gregson-Williams	5:31
12.	"Lisa & Gary"	Gregson-Williams; Smith	Gregson-Williams	6:14
13.	"F.A.G."	Gregson-Williams; Steve Jablonsky	Gregson-Williams	2:34
14.	"Putting a Jihad on You"	Gregson-Williams; Jablonsky	Gregson-Williams	3:44
15.	"Kim Jong-il"	Gregson-Williams; Jablonsky; Smith	Gregson-Williams	5:58
16.	"Mount, Rush, More"	Barton; Gregson-Williams	Gregson-Williams	4:21
Total length:				47:00

Featured songs not included in the soundtrack:

Name	Artist
"Magic Carpet Ride"	Steppenwolf
"Battle Without Honor or Humanity"	Tomoyasu Hotei
"Forbidden Bitter-Melon Dance"	Jeff Faustman
"Bu Dünyada Aşkından Ölmek"	Kubat

== Legacy ==
In the aftermath of the December 2014 terrorism threats by Guardians of Peace on showings of the film The Interview, which resulted in Sony Pictures pulling the film from release, several theatres, including Alamo Drafthouse Cinema in Austin, Texas, protested the loss by scheduling free showings of Team America: World Police. However, Paramount pulled distribution of Team America from theaters, including those in Cleveland, Atlanta, and New Orleans. This action was seen by President Barack Obama as an attack on freedom of speech by Hollywood studios, and others as an act of pure cowardice. Snippets of the film mocking Kim Jong Il were reportedly set to be included, alongside copies of The Interview, in helium-filled balloons launched by North Korean defectors into their home country in an effort to inspire education on the Western world's views on it.

== See also ==
- List of live-action puppet films

== Works cited ==
- Moriarty Visits Matt & Trey On The Team America Set! – set report from AintItCool.com
- Team America: World Police – synopsis, clips and images from LatinoReview.com
- "Play: South Park's Puppet Regime". Wired. Vol. 12, no. 10. October 2004. Archived from the original on October 10, 2004.
- BBC Interview with Matt Stone
- Team America – Guy In Bar Philosophy by composer M.Regtien
- Dubowsky, Jack Curtis (2017). "Team America: World Police: Duplicitous Voices of the Socio-political Spy Musical". In Donnelly, Kevin J.; Carroll, Beth (eds.). Contemporary Musical Film. Edinburgh: Edinburgh University Press. pp. 40–57. ISBN 9781474413138.
