= Film Roman =

American animation studio

Film Roman, LLC.
- Final logo, used from 2006 to 2018
- Formerly: Film Roman, Inc.
- Type: Subsidiary
- Traded as: Nasdaq: ROMN
- Industry: Animation; Motion pictures; Television production
- Predecessor: Mendelson/Melendez Productions
- Founded: October 26, 1984; 42 years ago
- Founder: Phil Roman
- Defunct: May 1, 2018; 8 years ago
- Fate: Forfeited
- Headquarters: Woodland Hills, Los Angeles, California, U.S.
- Key people: Steve Waterman (CEO); Phil Roman (chairman emeritus); Dana Booton (president of production)
- Parent: IDT Entertainment (2003–2006); Starz Inc. (2006–2015); Waterman Entertainment (2015–2018)
- Divisions: Film Roman Baja J.V.
- Website: filmroman.com

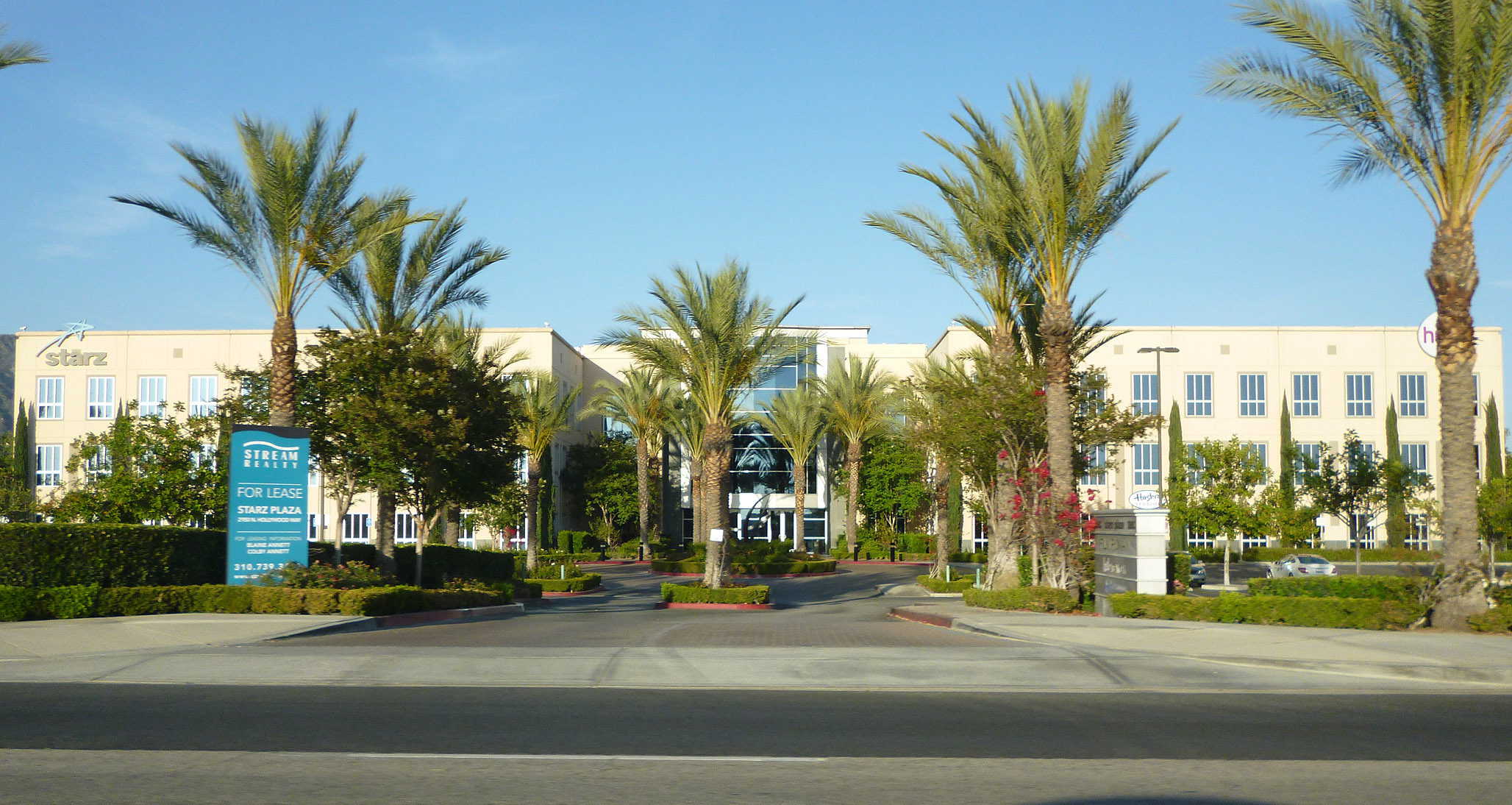
Film Roman's former headquarters in Burbank.

Film Roman, LLC. was an American animation studio based in Burbank, California and later in Woodland Hills, California. The company had several owners including Digital Production Services, Ltd., IDT Entertainment, Starz Inc. and Waterman Entertainment.

Founded by veteran animator and director Phil Roman on October 26, 1984, it is best known for providing animation for the Garfield primetime specials, based on Jim Davis' comic strip of the same name. The studio also produced the animated series The Simpsons, The Critic, King of the Hill, Family Guy, Wow! Wow! Wubbzy!, The Goode Family, and Dan Vs..

== History ==
=== Background ===
Phil Roman, veteran alumnus of MGM Animation/Visual Arts and Bill Melendez Productions, founded Film Roman on October 26, 1984, as a means to continue the production of the Garfield television specials, since Melendez's own studio was unable to work on both the Peanuts and Garfield specials. Peanuts executive producers Lee Mendelson and Bill Melendez and their aforementioned studio had produced the first two Garfield specials, but due to both Peanuts creator Charles M. Schulz' and Garfield creator Jim Davis' concerns about conflicting interests in allocating production priority at Melendez's boutique studio, the production had to be moved. While Roman was leaving for his already-established studio, he was offered the opportunity to produce the next Garfield prime time special, Garfield in the Rough (1984), for CBS by Mendelson, which he accepted and went on to produce and direct by himself, winning an Emmy in the process.

=== Formation ===
In 1985, CBS' head of children's programming Judy Price had commissioned an animated television series based on the Garfield prime time special series, later ultimately titled Garfield and Friends, which took three years for Roman to decide developing and producing the program before it eventually aired on the network's Saturday morning time slot, premiering on September 17, 1988. The aforementioned show was Film Roman's first regular series. In 1986, in an effort to expand and diversify the studio, Roman hired Marvel Productions VP of Business Affairs and his own personal attorney, Michael Wahl, as president and Bill Schultz, Marvel's Director of Development, to join in the company as the fledgling studio's VP of Production and Development. Garfield and Friends was expanded to an hour on CBS' number one rated Saturday Morning block and the studio grew to increase its capacity.

In 1988, the new management team developed, sold and produced a new series, Bobby's World, to the brand new Fox Kids Network, headed up by former Marvel Productions president Margaret Loesch. From 1992 to 2016, Film Roman took over the source production of 20th Century Fox's The Simpsons from Klasky-Csupo who had produced the one-minute teaser cartoon shorts on The Tracey Ullman Show as well as the animation for the first three seasons and the first two episodes of the fourth season (in total 61 episodes).

In 1999, Film Roman's founder Phil Roman left and sold the company to form Phil Roman Entertainment, the studio that produced Christmas television specials including Grandma Got Run Over by a Reindeer (2000), but he remained a shareholder of the company and then subsequently rejoined in 2001 as a member of the company's board of directors

At the same time, it attempted to get into the syndication market with the launch of Max Degree TV, which would have consisted of three shows, Mission Extreme from Steve Tisch, Sirens of the Deep from SFX artist Steve Wang, and a new Wes Archer cartoon Victor, but it never got off the ground.

In April 2000, The Harvey Entertainment Company became Film Roman's international sales representative and distributor in an effort for the former to branch out of its existing properties. Within the same year, India-based software firm Pentamedia Graphics attempted to acquire 51% stake in the studio for $15 million, but the deal later terminated in 2001.

=== IDT Entertainment and Starz ownership ===
In May 2003, the Digital Production Solutions division of IDT Corporation (formed in 2002) announced that it would acquire a 51% controlling interest and stake in Film Roman, which would temporarily renamed as DPS Film Roman, and the studio later became part of the newly-formed IDT Entertainment division in November that year.

In May 2006, IDT sold the IDT Entertainment division, which includes Film Roman, to Liberty Media for $186 million, the sale was completed on August 31, 2006, which resulted in IDT Entertainment becoming part of Starz Entertainment Group and renamed as Starz Media.

=== Waterman Entertainment ownership ===
In 2015, Film Roman was acquired from its parent company Starz Distribution by Waterman Entertainment, the production company of executive producer Steve Waterman. As such, it now it did business with Starz, which retained the company's in-house catalogue (currently held by Lionsgate Television).

On November 22, 2016, the company formed a joint venture based in Tijuana, called Film Roman Baja J.V. (also known as Film Roman Baja Productions), with Boxel Studios, a Baja California-based animation facility.

On October 9, 2017, the Secretary of State of California forfeited Film Roman, LLC, and the California Franchise Tax Board followed suit on May 1, 2018, forcing the studio to closedown operations. Business records show the company failed to produce a required Statement of Information for the year 2016. Waterman Entertainment shut down the following year after Steve Waterman made it defunct.

=== Location ===
The original studio was located on Riverside Drive in Toluca Lake, California, where Roman was also joined by Melendez producer Lee Mendelson. Years later, the studio moved to a new location on Chandler Blvd. in Studio City, before moving to another location at Starz Plaza on Hollywood Way in Burbank, which it shared with the former Hub Network and Hasbro Studios/Allspark, and then in Woodland Hills.

== Television series ==
Show	Creator(s)	Year(s)	Co-production(s)	Notes
Garfield and Friends	Jim Davis	1988–1994	United Media Productions (seasons 1–6); Lee Mendelson Film Productions (seasons 2–7); Paws, Inc.	
Bobby's World	Howie Mandel	1990–1998	Alevy Productions; Fox Children's Productions	
Zazoo U	Shane DeRolf	1990–1991	Fox Children's Productions	
Mother Goose and Grimm	Mike Peters	1991–1993	Tribune Media Services; Grimmy, Inc. Lee Mendelson Film Productions; MGM/UA Television Production Group	
The Simpsons	Matt Groening	1992–2016	Gracie Films; 20th Television	Production of seasons 4–27 only
Animated Classic Showcase		1993–1994	Soyuzmultfilm	
Cro	Mark Zaslove	1993–1994	Sesame Workshop	
Mighty Max	Mark Zaslove; Rob Hudnut	1993–1994	Bluebird Toys; Canal+ D.A. Bohbot Entertainment	
The Critic	Al Jean; Mike Reiss	1994–1995	Gracie Films; Columbia Pictures Television	
The Baby Huey Show	Bob Jaques	1995	Carbunkle Cartoons (season 1); Harveytoons; Claster Television	Season 2 only
The Mask: Animated Series	Duane Capizzi	1995–1997	Dark Horse Entertainment; Sunbow Entertainment; New Line Television	
Klutter!	David Silverman; Savage Steve Holland	1995–1996	Savage Studios; Fox Children's Productions	As part of Eek! Stravaganza
The Twisted Tales of Felix the Cat	Pat Sullivan; Otto Messmer; Joseph Oriolo	1995–1997	Felix the Cat Productions	
C Bear and Jamal	Earl Richey Jones; Todd R. Jones	1996–1997	Taurus Film GmbH and Co.	
Mortal Kombat: Defenders of the Realm	Sean Catherine Derek	1996	Threshold Entertainment; New Line Television; USA Studios	
Richie Rich	Timothy Williams	1996	Harveytoons; Claster Television	
Bruno the Kid	Joel Madison	1996–1997	Camelot Entertainment Sales; Active Entertainment; Taurus Film GmbH and Co.	
King of the Hill	Mike Judge; Greg Daniels	1997–2010	Deedle-Dee Productions; Judgemental Films; 3 Arts Entertainment; 20th Television (1997–2010)	Original 1997–2010 run only, replaced by 20th Television Animation for the revival
The Mr. Potato Head Show	Dan Clark; Doug Langdale	1998–1999	Hasbro	
Family Guy	Seth MacFarlane	1999–2000	Fuzzy Door Productions; 20th Television	Production season 1 only
Mission Hill	Bill Oakley; Josh Weinstein	1999–2002	Bill Oakley/Josh Weinstein Productions; Castle Rock Entertainment	
The Man Show	Adam Carolla; Jimmy Kimmel; Daniel Kellison	1999–2002	Jackhole Industries (seasons 1–5); Stone Stanley Entertainment; Comedy Partners	Animation; Currently distributed by Eagle Rock Entertainment
X-Men: Evolution	Marty Isenberg; Robert N. Skir; David Wise	2000–2003	Marvel Studios	
The Oblongs	Angus Oblong; Jace Richdale	2001–2002	Jobsite Productions; Mohawk Productions; Warner Bros. Television	
Free For All	Brett Merhar	2003	Showtime Networks	
Charlie's Angels: Animated Adventures	Ivan Goff; Ben Roberts	2003	Sony Pictures Digital; Hilltop New Media, Inc.	Web series Based on Charlie's Angels: Full Throttle
Tripping the Rift	Chris Moeller; Chuck Austen	2004–2007	Space; Teletoon (season 3); CinéGroupe	
Eloise: The Animated Series	Kay Thompson; Hilary Knight	2006	HandMade Films	
Law & Order	Dick Wolf	2006	Wolf Films; NBC Universal Television Studio	Visual effects
Eon Kid	Designstorm	2006–2007	Manga Entertainment; BRB Internacional; Daiwon; Designstorm; Screen 21; TVE	English dub
Wow! Wow! Wubbzy!	Bob Boyle	2006–2010	Bolder Media; Starz Media	
Slacker Cats	Andy Riley; Kevin Cecil	2007–2009	Laika; ABC Family	
The Goode Family	Mike Judge; John Altschuler; Dave Krinsky	2009	Ternion Pictures; 3 Arts Entertainment; Judgemental Films; Media Rights Capital	
The Super Hero Squad Show	Stan Lee	2009–2011	Ingenious Media (season 1); Marvel Animation	
The Avengers: Earth's Mightiest Heroes	Ciro Nieli; Joshua Fine; Christopher Yost	2010–2012	Ingenious Media (season 1); Marvel Animation	
Dan Vs.	Dan Mandel; Chris Pearson	2011–2013	The Hatchery	
Beavis and Butt-Head	Mike Judge	2011	Ternion Pictures; 3 Arts Entertainment; Judgemental Films; MTV Production Development	Season 8 only
Ultimate Spider-Man	Marvel Animation	2012–2017	Marvel Animation	
Hulk and the Agents of S.M.A.S.H.	Paul Dini; Henry Gilroy; Marvel Animation	2013–2015	Marvel Animation	
Camp WWE	Seth Green	2016–2018	Stoopid Buddy Stoodios; WWE Studios	

== Films and specials ==
Title	Year	Co-production(s)	Notes
Garfield in the Rough	1984	United Media	The studio's inaugural production
Garfield's Halloween Adventure	1985	United Media	
Garfield in Paradise	1986	United Media	
Garfield Goes Hollywood	1987	United Media	
A Garfield Christmas	1987	United Media; Paws, Inc.	
Happy Birthday, Garfield	1988	Paws, Inc.	
Garfield: His 9 Lives	1988	United Media; Paws, Inc.	
Garfield's Babes and Bullets	1989	United Media; Paws, Inc.	
The Pink Panther	1989	MGM Television	Unreleased live-action/animated pilot
Garfield's Thanksgiving	1989	United Media; Paws, Inc.	
Garfield's Feline Fantasies	1990	United Media; Lee Mendelson Productions; Paws, Inc.	
Garfield Gets a Life	1991	United Media; Lee Mendelson Productions; Paws, Inc.	
Tom and Jerry: The Movie	1992	Live Entertainment; Turner Entertainment Co. WMG Film; Miramax Films	Currently distributed by Warner Bros. Pictures
Nick & Noel	1993	Bohbot Entertainment	
A Cool Like That Christmas	1993		
The Bears Who Saved Christmas	1994	Bohbot Entertainment	
Izzy's Quest for Olympic Gold	1995	International Olympic Committee	
The Story of Santa Claus	1996	Arnold Shapiro Productions; CBS Productions	
The Magic Pearl	1997	Greengrass Productions	
Puss in Boots	1997		
Super Bowl XXXIII (The Simpsons short)	1999	Gracie Films; 20th Television	
Johnny Tsunami	1999	Disney Channel	Live-action
Hairballs	2000		Unsold TV series pilot created by Mr. Lawrence
Motocrossed	2001	Stu Segall Productions; Disney Channel	Live-action
My First Mister	2001	Total Film Group; ApolloMedia Film Management GmbH; Paramount Classics	Live-action
The Santa Claus Brothers	2001	Sitting Ducks Productions; Disney Channel; Nelvana	
Second Time Around	2002	Mei Ah Entertainment	Visual effects
Hellraiser: Hellseeker	2002	Dimension Home Video	Visual effects
Daredevil	2003	20th Century Studios; Regency Enterprises; Marvel Enterprises; Horseshoe Bay Productions	Visual effects
The Fallen Ones	2003	The Fallen Ones Inc. Sci Fi Channel	Visual effects
I, Robot	2004	20th Century Studios; Davis Entertainment; Laurence Mark Productions; Overbrook Films; Mediastream IV	Visual effects
Demon Hunter	2005	New Arc Entertainment	Visual effects
All Souls Day	2005	Anchor Bay Entertainment	Visual effects
American Dad!: Inside the CIA	2005	20th Century Studios; 20th Century Animation; Fuzzy Door Productions; Underdog Productions; Rough Draft Studios	Short film Additional animation
Weebles: Welcome to Weebleville!	2005	Playskool; Hasbro	
Weebles: Sharing in the Fun!	2005	Playskool; Hasbro	
The Happy Elf	2005	HC Productions; DKP Studios	
Voodoo Moon	2006	IDT Entertainment; Sci Fi Channel	Visual effects
Slayer	2006	Anchor Bay Entertainment; Sci Fi Channel	Visual effects
Jackass Number Two	2006	Paramount Pictures; MTV Films; Dickhouse Productions; Lynch Siderow Productions	Visual effects
Hellboy: Sword of Storms	2006	Revolution Studios	
Mosaic	2007	POW! Entertainment; Manga Entertainment	
Hellboy: Blood and Iron	2007	Revolution Studios	
The Thirst	2007	Anchor Bay Entertainment	Visual effects
The Simpsons Movie	2007	20th Century Studios; 20th Century Animation; Gracie Films; Matt Groening Productions; Rough Draft Studios; AKOM	Pre-production split between Film Roman and Rough Draft Studios
Sands of Oblivion	2007	Starz Productions; Sci Fi Channel	Visual effects
Rush Hour 3	2007	New Line Cinema; Roger Birnbaum Productions; Arthur Sarkissian Productions; Unlike Film Productions	Visual effects Trailer only
Illegal Tender	2007	Universal Pictures	Visual effects
Hairspray	2007	New Line Cinema; Ingenious Media; Zadan/Meron Productions; Storyline Entertainment; Offspring Entertainment	Visual effects Trailer only
The Great Buck Howard	2008	Magnolia Pictures; Playtone; Walden Media; Bristol Bay Productions	Visual effects
Turok: Son of Stone	2008	Classic Media	
Speed Racer	2008	Warner Bros. Pictures; Village Roadshow Pictures; Silver Pictures; Anarchos Productions	Visual effects
Sex and the City	2008	Warner Bros. Pictures; New Line Cinema; HBO Films	Visual effects Trailer only
Tripping the Rift: The Movie	2008	CinéGroupe	
Wubbzy's Big Movie!	2008	Bolder Media	
Dead Space: Downfall	2008	Electronic Arts	
Secrets of the Furious Five	2008	DreamWorks Animation; Reel FX Creative Studios	2-D sequences
Cranberry Christmas	2008	Ocean Spray Productions	
Wow! Wow! Wubbzy!: Wubb Idol	2009	Bolder Media	
The Haunted World of El Superbeasto	2009	Carbunkle Cartoons	Planned for theatrical release
Dante's Inferno: An Animated Epic	2010	Electronic Arts	"Prologue", "The Arrival", "Entry to Hell" only
Dead Space: Aftermath	2011	Electronic Arts; Visceral Games	
The Simpsons: The Longest Daycare	2012	20th Century Studios; 20th Century Animation; Gracie Films; Matt Groening Productions; Rough Draft Studios; AKOM	Short film Pre-production split between Film Roman and Rough Draft Studios
Max Steel: Turbo-Charged	2017	Mattel Creations	
Max Steel: Turbo-Warriors	2017	Mattel Creations	

== Miscellaneous ==
- Get in Line (Barenaked Ladies music video)
- Frijolero (Molotov music video)
- Unaired American Dad! pitch pilot (2003)
- The Simpsons Game (2007, produced by Electronic Arts) (cutscenes only)
- The Simpsons Ride (2008, amusement simulator ride film produced for the attraction of the same name at Universal Orlando Resort and Universal Studios Hollywood)
- The Simpsons: Tapped Out (2012, freemium mobile game produced for Fox Digital Entertainment and Electronic Arts) (cutscenes only)

=== Commercials ===
- Alpo
- Ask Jeeves (2000) (five-minute branding reel)
- Burger King (2001–2003)
- Butterfinger (1992–1994, 1998–2001, 2007)
- CC's (1998)
- C.C. Lemon (2000–2002)
- Embassy Suites Hotel
- Expedia (2003)
- Garfield Fruit Snacks
- General Foods
- Honey Nut Cheerios (1993) (Garfield ad only)
- Intel (1998)
- Matchbox (2002) (CGI sales presentation animated by Forum Visual Effects)
- Microsoft (2003)
- Mirinda (2005–2006, 2008)
- Partnership for a Drug-Free America (2002)
- RC Cola (1999)
- SeaWorld (1998)
- SHO Too (2002)
- Toyota (1992–1993)
- Trix (1991)

=== Unreleased projects ===
- Blues Brothers: The Animated Series (Canceled due to irreplaceable casting of the original actors)
- Max Degree TV (Cancelled due to lack of international backers)
- Heathcliff (CGI animated television series adaptation of the comic strip by George Gately, cancelled following the studio's shutdown, would have been co-produced by Creators Syndicate and Foothill Entertainment)
- This Modern World (Animated television series adaptation of the comic strip by Tom Tomorrow, cancelled following the studio's shutdown)
- The Untamed (Based on the graphic novel by Sebastian A. Jones and Peter Bergting, cancelled following the studio's shutdown)

== See also ==
- Phil Roman Entertainment
- Starz Animation
