= Kevin VanHook =

American film director (born 1965)

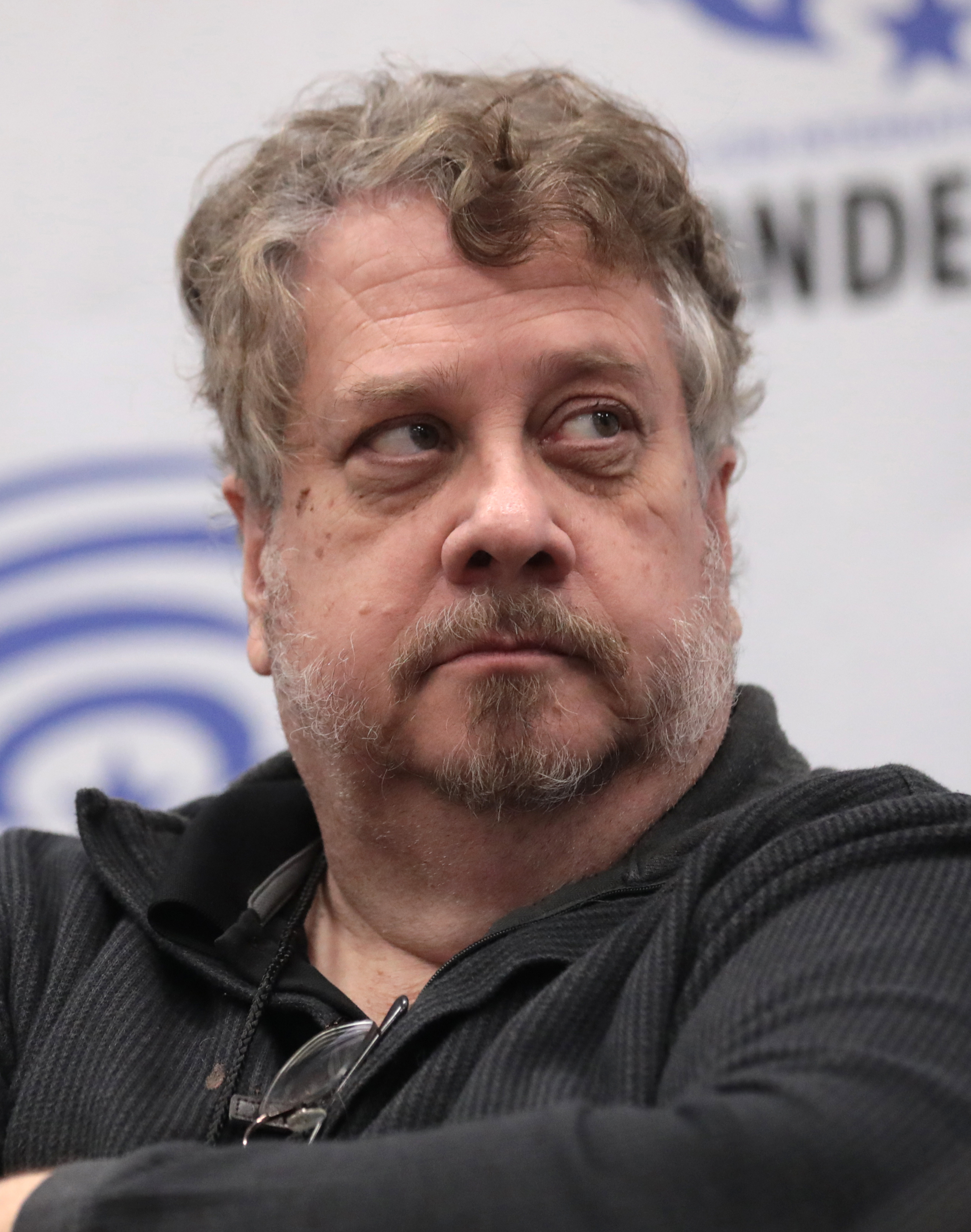
- VanHook at the 2023 WonderCon
- Born: June 24, 1965 (age 61); Indianapolis, Indiana, U.S.
- Occupations: Comic book writer, comic book artist, visual effects supervisor, filmmaker
- Children: Corwin VanHook; Cameron VanHook
- Writing career
- Genres: Horror; Superhero
- Notable work: Bloodshot
- Website: www.kevinvanhook.com

Kevin VanHook (born June 24, 1965) is an American comic book writer, comic book artist, visual effects supervisor, and filmmaker.

== Career ==
In comics, VanHook is best known for creating the character Bloodshot for Valiant Comics. He also wrote the Flash Gordon comic strip from January 3, 1993, to January 2, 1994.

In 1996, he made his first short film, Drifter. In 1998, he began filming Frost: Portrait of a Vampire while founding a visual effects company, VanHook Studios. Frost was completed in 2001 and released on DVD in 2003, where it became the 18th highest grossing DVD premiere that year.

In 2002, VanHook Studios merged with Film Roman, the animation company best known for animating The Simpsons. During his stint as a visual effects artist and supervisor, VanHook has worked on such films as Miss Congeniality, Hart's War, Daredevil, I, Robot and many others.

Film Roman was acquired by IDT Corporation, an international telephone company expanding into entertainment in 2003. After IDT acquired Anchor Bay Entertainment, a leading DVD distributor, VanHook created a new film for IDT, The Fallen Ones starring Casper Van Dien and Robert Wagner. This was followed by Voodoo Moon an action-horror film packed with genre stars like Eric Mabius, Charisma Carpenter, Jeffrey Combs and Dee Wallace.

In mid-2006 IDT Entertainment was acquired by Starz Media, a division of Liberty.

Beginning in 2006, VanHook, along with producing partner Karen Bailey, created a series of films designed for Sci Fi Channel. Films by Kevin include, "Slayer" and, "Death Row," AKA "Haunted Prison." These films are available on DVD from Anchor Bay Entertainment.

VanHook's 2008 documentary, "Fantastic Flesh: The Art of Make-Up EFX" includes a who's who of the American horror and make-up world. Working closely with Greg Nicotero and Howard Berger from K.N.B. EFX Group, VanHook interviewed Quentin Tarantino, Robert Rodriguez, John Landis and Joe Dante, John Carpenter, George A. Romero, Tom Savini and make-up legends Rob Bottin and Dick Smith among many others.

VanHook returned to comics in 2008 to write Superman and Batman vs. Vampires and Werewolves at DC Comics, as well as the Oracle mini-series that forms a part of the Battle for the Cowl storyline which deals with the aftermath of Batman R.I.P..

In early 2011, VanHook joined Visual Effects Supervisor Wes C. Caefer at Worldwide Effects in Shreveport, Louisiana to Produce the visual effects for TRESPASS, a Joel Schumacher film starring Nicolas Cage and Nicole Kidman.

VanHook was the Visual Effects Supervisor for the Rizzoli & Isles Television Series for four Seasons.

In 2015, VanHook began working with Hollow Studios in pre-production on a series of large format Dome Theater productions for a theme park being constructed in San Diego and was instrumental in creating the production and visual effects pipelines as well as overseeing photography in the U.S., U.K and Israel.

2017 saw VanHook reunited with Casper Van Dien along with Jennifer Wenger and Patrick Muldoon in the horror film Alpha Wolf written by Wes C. Caefer.

In July 2022, VanHook appeared at San Diego Comic-Con with Jakarta-Indonesia based Visi8 Entertainment, promoting new comic books he had created. The first two original titles are Changelings and The Seventh Tiger. A distribution deal with Diamond Comics Distribution came out of that convention with the first comic books being released in February 2023.

In October 2022, it was announced that Kevin VanHook had begun writing comic books for Frank Miller Presents with the title Ancient Enemies: Djinni.

== Works ==
=== Comics ===
- Amazing Comics Premieres #1 (1987)
- Jack Frost #1-2 (1987)
- Bloodshot #1-39 (writer, Valiant Comics, 1993–1995)
- The Visitor #1-3 (writer, with pencils by Bernard Chang, Valiant Comics, 1995)
- Superman and Batman vs. Vampires and Werewolves (with Tom Mandrake, 6-issue limited series, DC Comics, 2008–2009)
- G.I. Joe: Snake-Eyes #1 (co-writer with Ray Park, with pencils by Lee Ferguson, IDW, 2009)
- Red Tornado #1-6 (writer, with art by José Luís and J.P. Mayer, 6-issue limited series, DC Comics, 2009–2010)

=== Films ===
- Frost: Portrait of a Vampire (2002)
- I, Robot (2004)
- The Fallen Ones (2005)
- Voodoo Moon (2005)
- Slayer (2006)
- Death Row—AKA Haunted Prison (2006)
- Sands of Oblivion (2007) as co-writer and producer
- Fantastic Flesh: The Art of Make-Up EFX (documentary) (2008)
- Olympus Has Fallen (2013)
- Alpha Wolf (2018)

=== Television ===
- Exposure (status: production) – As of January 2021, the project had not moved forward.
- Rizzoli & Isles (Visual Effects Supervisor)
- Southland (Visual Effects Supervisor – 1 episode)
- The Vampire Diaries (compositor – 4 episodes)
- Law and Order: Criminal Intent (Visual Effects Supervisor – 3 episodes)
- Law and Order (Visual Effects Supervisor – 5 episodes)
