= The Zula Patrol =

Animated children's television series

- Genre: Edutainment; Science fiction; Adventure
- Created by: Deb M. Manchester
- Written by: Cydne Clark; Nicole Dubuc; Simon Jowett
- Directed by: Brain Kindregan; Kent Butterwoth
- Voices of: Cam Clarke; Colleen O'Shaughnessey; Nika Futterman; Kurt Kelly; Frank Welker
- Composers: Jeff Danna; Fletcher Beasley
- Country of origin: United States
- Original language: English
- No. of seasons: 3
- No. of episodes: 52

Production
- Executive producers: Deb M. Manchester; Beth Hubbard; Margaret Loesch
- Production companies: Gotham Entertainment (season 1); Kambooteron Productions (season 1); The Hatchery; Zula USA; UNC TV; American Public Television

Original release
- Network: PBS Kids (member stations only)
- Release: September 10, 2005 – June 18, 2008

The Zula Patrol is an American animated children's television series that aired from September 2005 to June 2008. Targeted at pre-kindergarteners to 2nd graders. It was produced by PBS station UNC-TV, Kambooteron Productions, Gotham Entertainment and The Hatchery and distributed by American Public Television to PBS stations within the United States. The series is about a group of aliens that travel the Solar System in a flying saucer, teaching viewers about astronomy, physics, chemistry, and also life lessons. Many episodes revolve around their attempts to thwart the evil Dark Truder's plans. Also, the show includes interactions with planets and moons in the Solar System, who are depicted with faces.

The series also aired reruns and a marathon on Qubo.

== Characters ==
=== The Zula Patrol ===
- Captain Bula (voiced by Cam Clarke) is a lime green alien and the captain/leader of the Zula Patrol. Bula is very compassionate, patient and likes to assist other characters in the series.
- Space Pilot Zeeter (voiced by Colleen O'Shaughnessey) is a purple alien and the Zula Patrol’s main pilot and one of the main protagonists of the series. She is mainly Bula’s companion. When not piloting the ship, Zeeter often rides her Zula-scooter just for fun, which is made from iron.
- Professor Multo (also voiced by Cam Clarke) is a yellowish-orange three-eyed scientist for the Zula Patrol. He is known as the most intelligent patroller of the Zula Patrol, known for creating various inventions, and has an encyclopedia-like book called the Multopedia, which is used to answer his friends’ questions (especially Wizzy and Wigg’s). His voice is based on that of renowned comedian Ed Wynn.
- Flying Wonder Wizzy (voiced by Colleen O'Shaughnessey) and Flying Wonder Wigg (voiced by Nika Futterman) are two flying bee/firefly aliens who are the youngest members of the Zula Patrol. Wizzy is colored light blue, and Wigg is colored royal purple. They both appear in every episode to date, and are nearly inseparable. It is possible that their names are a reference to the programming term WYSIWYG.
- Space Pet Gorga (voiced by Frank Welker) is the Zula Patrol’s space pet and Bula’s other companion. He has various abilities, such as the ability to snort just about anything out of his snout, and the ability to inflate himself to a very large size. He is most often seen with Wizzy and Wigg.

=== Villains ===
- Dark Truder (voiced by Kurt Kelly)
- Traxie (voiced by Colleen O'Shaughnessey)
- Deliria (voiced by Colleen O'Shaughnessey)
- Cloid (voiced by Dave Wittenberg)

== Episodes ==
=== Series overview ===
Season	Episodes	Originally released	
Season	Episodes	First released	Last released
1	26	September 10, 2005	March 4, 2006
2	13	April 14, 2007	May 2, 2007
3	13	June 2, 2008	June 18, 2008

=== Season 1 (2005–06) ===
No. overall	No. in season	Title	Original release date
1	1	"A Comet's Tale / A Job for the Zula Dudes"	September 10, 2005
2	2	"Bula's Spin Party / Day For Night"	September 17, 2005
3	3	"Shadow Play / Jealous Moon"	September 24, 2005
4	4	"Sun Day / Time Out"	October 1, 2005
5	5	"The Probe Who Came to Dinner / Forget-Me-Naut"	October 8, 2005
6	6	"Small is Beautiful / Case of the Missing Rings"	October 15, 2005
7	7	"Blue Moon / Going Through a Phase"	October 22, 2005
8	8	"Giant Litterbugs From Space / RV of the Giants"	October 29, 2005
9	9	"Chilly Cook-off / Treasure in the Clouds"	November 5, 2005
10	10	"Star Crossed / Night of the Fweeebs"	November 12, 2005
11	11	"Mutual Distraction / What Goes Up Must Come Down"	November 19, 2005
12	12	"Dog Gone Gorga / The Milky Way Galaxy Games"	November 26, 2005
13	13	"Matter Matter Everywhere / Family Feud"	December 3, 2005
14	14	"Round and Round We Go / Go'er-Slower Motion"	December 10, 2005
15	15	"Club Mars / The Outsider"	December 17, 2005
16	16	"The Ins and Outs of Planets / Young At Heart"	December 24, 2005
17	17	"The Big Mess / Telescooped"	December 31, 2005
18	18	"Show of Force / Adventures In Pet Sitting"	January 7, 2006
19	19	"Fly Us To the Moon / Castaway Asteroid"	January 14, 2006
20	20	"Take Me To Your Ferret / Earth Hunt"	January 21, 2006
21	21	"Wish You Were Here / Weather Vain"	January 28, 2006
22	22	"My Air Lady / You're Cramping My Space"	February 4, 2006
23	23	"Wigg and Wizzy Light the Way / Look to the Rainbow"	February 11, 2006
24	24	"Three Ringed Gorga / Moons Mayhem"	February 18, 2006
25	25	"A Star is Born / Galactic Star Games"	February 25, 2006
26	26	"Blubglub / Power Flower"	March 4, 2006

=== Season 2 (2007) ===
No. overall	No. in season	Title	Original release date
27	1	"The Things In Rings / How the Rust Was Won"	April 16, 2007
28	2	"Ice Station Zula / Ice Truder"	April 17, 2007
29	3	"Dueling Space Stations / Don't Look Now"	April 18, 2007
30	4	"Rock and Patrol / Support Your Neighborhood Volcano"	April 19, 2007
31	5	"Down Under / Singin' In the Rain Forest"	April 20, 2007
32	6	"Hide 'n Seek on Jupiter / A Tale of Two Planets"	April 23, 2007
33	7	"The Sound of Multo / Eyes in the Skies"	April 24, 2007
34	8	"Birds of a Feather / Bula's Heros: The Great Camouflage Caper"	April 25, 2007
35	9	"Moon Struck / Me, Myself and Io"	April 26, 2007
36	10	"My Friend Named Breezy / Erosion Today, Gone Tomorrow"	April 27, 2007
37	11	"Blast to Earth's Past / The Great Climb"	April 30, 2007
38	12	"Creature Features / Fried Greenhouse Tomatoes"	May 1, 2007
39	13	"If it Looks Like a Plant / Splitsville"	May 2, 2007

=== Season 3 (2008) ===
No. overall	No. in season	Title	Original release date
40	1	"Larva Or Leave Me / Egg Hunt"	June 2, 2008
41	2	"Spin Control: The Venus Effect / Crater Raters: Journey to Mercury"	June 3, 2008
42	3	"Hey Kids, Amazing Space Monkeys! / The Blorp"	June 4, 2008
43	4	"Vanishing Cream / There Goes The Neighborhood"	June 5, 2008
44	5	"The Missing Elements / Journey to the Center of Gorga"	June 6, 2008
45	6	"Choosing Sides / Camp Worm"	June 9, 2008
46	7	"May The Force Be Wigg You / Six Zuleans In A Boat"	June 10, 2008
47	8	"Where Did All The Water Go / The Dew Drops"	June 11, 2008
48	9	"The Show Must Float On / The Truder Crown Affair"	June 12, 2008
49	10	"The Great River Race / When You Wish Upon A Sea Star"	June 13, 2008
50	11	"Mine Shaft / The Crystal Cave"	June 16, 2008
51	12	"The Lizard That Came to Dinner / Island Of The Endotherms"	June 17, 2008
52	13	"The Villain Of The Year / One Is The Loneliest Number"	June 18, 2008

== Awards and nominations ==
In 2006, the series was nominated for an Annie Award for Best Music in an Animated Television Production (Jeff Danna, for the episode "Case of the Missing Rings").

== Other media ==
Mission Weather was a traveling exhibition in which Captain Bula, Professor Multo, Space Pilot Zeeter, flying wonders Wizzy and Wigg, and Space Pet Gorga invite you to a hands-on, interactive exhibit to learn all about clouds, precipitation, wind, temperature, and other weather phenomena.
