= Frost: Portrait of a Vampire =

- DVD cover
- Directed by: Kevin VanHook
- Written by: Kevin VanHook
- Produced by: David A. Jackson; Shauna Shapiro Jackson; Bruce Lee; Scott Norby
- Starring: Gary Busey; Jeff Manzanares; Charles Lister; Karen Bailey; Shane P. Allen
- Cinematography: Matt Steinauer
- Edited by: Kevin VanHook
- Music by: William Richter
- Production company: Artisan Entertainment
- Distributed by: Showcase Entertainment
- Release dates: February 23, 2002 (American Film Institute); June 17, 2003 (DVD/VHS)
- Running time: 92 minutes
- Country: United States
- Language: English

Frost: Portrait of a Vampire is a 2002 American direct-to-video horror thriller film by Kevin VanHook. The film stars Gary Busey, Jeff Manzanares, Charles Lister, Karen Bailey, and Shane P. Allen.

== Premise ==
After returning from military service together in Afghanistan, a painter must kill his best friend, who became a vampire.

== Cast ==
- Gary Busey as Micah
- Jeff Manzanares as Jonathon "Jack" Frost
- Charles Lister as Nat McKenzie
- Karen Bailey as Nancy McKenzie
- Shane P. Allen as Dan
- Amy Angelowicz as Bunkhouse Girl
- Steven Ted Beckler as the Captain
- Delaina Brown as Bunkhouse Girl
- Jeff Coatney as the Priest
- Melissa Di Meglio as Linda
- Cathy Fitzpatrick as Lady on Plane
- Alfonso Freeman as Ken
- Michael Lloyd Gilliland as Mercenary

== Production ==
VanHook based the film's story around the comic book he wrote about a vampire named Jack Frost. Principal photography was shot in 2001 in Los Angeles and on location in San Diego. Some scenes were filmed in Borrego Springs.

== Release ==
Showcase Entertainment acquired the film in 2001. It screened at the American Film Institute on February 23, 2002, and was released on DVD and VHS on June 17, 2003.

== Reception ==
Dread Central scored it 0 out of 5 and said "This isn't a movie. This is punishment." Forrest Hartman at Reno Gazette-Journal scored the film a D− and said "everything from the cinematography to the dialogue is hackneyed."

Barry Caine at Oakland Tribune said "the humorless, low-budget horror film contains the worst acting, top to bottom, that I have seen." Brian Accardo at MovieWeb said it had "incredibly bad special effects, terrible acting, poor writing, and a head-scratching story." Brad Slager at Film Threat questioned VanHook's choices on how a film with its premise and Busey attached managed to turn out the way it did.

Bob Curtright at The Wichita Eagle compared the film to From Dusk till Dawn, saying that "shoddy special effects only enhance its cult potential." Ed Hulse at Video Business praised Busey's "extended cameo" performance, saying "it's an earnest little chiller, reasonably well made for short money, but it never really clicks" and "a more rapid pace and dynamic action scenes would have helped."

The film ranks #6 on MovieWeb's "10 Horror Movies That Are Unintentionally Very Funny"
