= Black Widow (2010 film) =

- Film poster
- Directed by: Mark Roemmich
- Written by: Mark Roemmich
- Produced by: Mark Roemmich; Jack Scalia
- Starring: Jack Scalia; Jennifer O'Dell; Christopher McDonald; Joanna Pacula; Krista Allen; Rachel Hunter
- Cinematography: David Drzeweichi
- Edited by: Mark Warner; Don Zimmerman
- Music by: Alan Williams
- Production company: United Artists
- Distributed by: MGM/UA Entertainment Company (US & Canada); United International Pictures (International)
- Release date: March 28, 2010
- Running time: 100 minutes
- Country: United States
- Language: English

Black Widow is a 2010 thriller film directed by Mark Roemmich and starring Jack Scalia, Jennifer O'Dell, and Christopher McDonald.

== Premise ==
Sean McMurphy, a wealthy entrepreneur, meets a very beautiful woman and a passionate love affair ignites but soon it unfolds into a dark suspense/thriller where everyone around him is seduced into her dark web of lies, torture and deceit.

== Cast ==
- Jack Scalia as Sean
- Jennifer O'Dell as Natalie
- Christopher McDonald as Steve
- Joanna Pacula as Olivia
- Krista Allen as Jennifer
- Rachel Hunter as Dr. Laura
- Brennan Elliott as Troy
- Traci Bingham as Lynda
- Gina La Piana as Gloria
- Elizabeth Wood as Brooke
- Patrick Thomas Gorman as Tom

== Reception ==
The film received mixed to positive reception from critics. Roger Ebert gave it 3/4 stars.
