= Nevermore (2007 film) =

- Directed by: Thomas Zambeck
- Written by: Thomas Zambeck
- Produced by: Angela Barakat; Thomas Zambeck
- Starring: Vincent Spano; Jennifer O'Dell; Judd Nelson; Sidi Henderson
- Cinematography: Oren Goldenberg
- Edited by: Josh Wagner
- Music by: Mark Krench
- Release date: September 12, 2007 (Harvard Independent Film Group)
- Country: United States
- Language: English

Nevermore is a 2007 film written and directed by independent director Thomas Zambeck.

== Plot ==
Judd Nelson plays a wealthy but unstable hermit, Jonathan Usher, who is convinced he will soon become insane much as his father did; his father actually did go insane and murdered Jonathan's mother.

He hires a private investigator (Vincent Spano) to look into his wife's possible motives for helping drive him insane. The wife, Jennifer O'Dell, is a sort of trophy wife; Jonathan is certain that she is out to both drive him insane and rob him of his fortune.
