= Steve Waterman (producer) =

American film producer

Steve Waterman (born February 27, 1950) is a film and television producer.

He was co-producer for Casper and executive producer for Stuart Little and Stuart Little 2.

He also executive produced the live-action/CGI animated Alvin and the Chipmunks, Alvin and the Chipmunks: The Squeakquel, Alvin and the Chipmunks: Chipwrecked and Alvin and the Chipmunks: The Road Chip. He also co-created the 1990s television series High Tide.

In 1999, Waterman formed his own production company, Waterman Entertainment. In 2011, the company gained film rights for Strikeforce: Morituri from creator Peter B. Gillis expected to be its first live action film. Strikeforce was to start production in December 2011. Waterman Entertainment purchased the animation studio Film Roman from November 12, 2015 to May 1, 2018.

== Filmography ==
Year	Title	Role	Notes
1995	Casper	co-producer	
1996	Born Free: A New Adventure	executive producer	Television film
1997	Kull the Conqueror	executive producer	
1998	Jungle Book: Lost Treasure	executive producer	
1999	Stuart Little	executive producer	
2002	Stuart Little 2	executive producer	
2007	Alvin and the Chipmunks	executive producer	
2009	Alvin and the Chipmunks: The Squeakquel	executive producer	
2011	Alvin and the Chipmunks: Chipwrecked	executive producer	
2015	Alvin and the Chipmunks: The Road Chip	executive producer	
