= Jennifer O'Dell =

American actress

- Born: November 27, 1974 (age 51); Ridgecrest, California
- Occupation: Actress
- Years active: 1994–present
- Children: 2

Jennifer O'Dell (born November 27, 1974) is an American actress. She is known for her performance in the television series Sir Arthur Conan Doyle's The Lost World (1999–2002).

== Biography ==
At the age of eight, O'Dell was cast in a national candy commercial at her very first audition. She took a hiatus through high school to enjoy her youth, but resumed her acting career soon after graduation. She guest starred on a number of television series, including Beverly Hills, 90210. In 1999 she gained fame as the scantily-clad jungle girl Veronica Layton on The Lost World. This role elevated her career and she has since appeared in several films and guest starred on such popular television shows as Scrubs, NCIS, and Two and a Half Men. She appeared in the TV series CSI: Miami episode "Nailed" as Charlene Hartford, the woman responsible for accidentally injuring the character Ryan Wolfe with a nailgun.

She lives in Southern California and has two sons.

O'Dell has also been a professional photographer since 2009.

== Filmography ==
=== Film ===
Year	Title	Role	Notes
1997	A spasso nel tempo: l'avventura continua	1st Saloon Girl	
1998	Sometimes They Come Back... for More	Mary	Video
1999	Molly	Actress on TV	
2000	Point Doom	Stephanie	
2005	Window Theory	Stephanie	
2007	Saving Sarah Cain	Madison Miller	
2007	Nevermore	Lydia Usher	
2008	The Man Who Came Back	Elena	
2010	Black Widow	Natalie	
2013	Alien Battlefield	Stephanie	
TBA	Balkan Cursed Dream		

=== Television ===
Year	Title	Role	Notes
1995	Renegade	Linda	"Most Wanted"
1995	Silk Stalkings	Gayle	"Family Affairs"
1996	Renegade	Patrice	"Love Hurts"
1996	Wiseguy	Blonde #2	TV film
1996	Silk Stalkings	Shauna Celine	"Prey of the Fox"
1997	Silk Stalkings	Mariah	"Air-Tight Alibi"
1997	Don King: Only in America	Bikini Girl (uncredited)	TV film
1998	Profiler	Bartender	"Every Five Minutes"
1998	Pacific Blue	Sherry Sweet	"Seduced"
1998	Diagnosis: Murder	Jolene	"Dead in the Water"
1998	Beverly Hills, 90210	Nancy Ann	"You Say Goodbye, I Say Hello"
1999	Beverly Hills, 90210	Katie	"Local Hero", "The End of the World as We Know It"
1999	The Lost World	Veronica Layton	TV film
1999–2002	The Lost World	Veronica Layton	Main role; 59 episodes
2001	Leap Years	Amanda Dooling	"1.14"
2003	Scrubs	Stunning Woman	"My Lucky Night"
2004	Las Vegas	Liza Cranston	"The Family Jewels"
2004	Charmed	Elisa	"A Wrong Day's Journey Into Right"
2004	She Spies	Haley Swann	"Wedding of the Century"
2004	Nip/Tuck	Renee	"Rose and Raven Rosenberg"
2005	The Closer	Allison Metcalfe	"About Face"
2005	CSI: Miami	Charlene Hartford	"Nailed"
2005	Out of Practice	Cynthia	"The Wedding"
2006	Slayer	Dr. Laurie Williams	TV film
2007	Shark	Sonja Crawford	"Teacher's Pet"
2007	CSI: NY	Miss Di Martino	"The Ride In"
2007	Two and a Half Men	Margaret	"Media Room Slash Dungeon"
2008	NCIS	Dina Rankin	"In the Zone"
2008	iCarly	Kathy Millford	"iOwe You"
2012	Bones	Ruby Schnepp	"The Don't in the Do"
2016	Modern Family	Brenda	"Thunk in the Trunk"
