= Heart of a Dragon =

- Directed by: Michael French
- Written by: Michael French
- Produced by: Michael French
- Starring: Victor Webster; Jim Byrnes
- Cinematography: Bing Rao
- Edited by: Chris Ainscough; Jana Fritsch
- Music by: Chris Ainscough; David Foster
- Production companies: China Film Group; Thunder Bay Films
- Release date: 2008
- Countries: Canada; China
- Language: English

Heart of a Dragon is a 2008 film produced by Thunder Bay Films Inc (part of Associated Film Producers Ltd) in Vancouver, Canada. The film was inspired by Rick Hansen's 1986 Man in Motion Tour's true story that challenged perceptions about disability. In the movie, Rick Hansen, a disabled athlete, attempts to prove the potential of people with disabilities and inspire a more accessible world by embarking on a 26-month journey that leads him to China and "The Great Wall."

== Plot ==
Reporter Ivan Kostelic is waiting with his equipment on a railway platform in China. He is tired from his travels and walks slowly with a cane towards the arriving train. Ivan is investigating a report of million-strong crowds assembling in streets to welcome Rick Hansen, a world champion athlete and advocate for disabled people who is traveling the world in his wheelchair.

China has a long history of prejudice against disabled people. One of China's most influential and admired political leaders, Deng Pufang, was beaten as a boy by Red Guards and thrown off the roof of a Beijing university as a warning to his father, Deng Xiaoping. Deng Pufang was rescued by emissaries from the United States and Canadian diplomatic staff. The emissaries hid and secretly transported Deng Pufang to Canada, where he was rehabilitated. Deng Pufang returned to China when his father Deng Xiaoping became Premier.

Deng Pufang waits in his wheelchair as Rick Hansen arrives in China. Deng had become an important figure in Chinese life. Millions of streamed into the streets to greet Hansen; Ivan Kostelic covered Rick Hansen when he competed his athletic achievements but Kostelic is not convinced of Hansen's intentions or commitment.

Kostelic follows Hansen through China to the Great Wall and watches as Hansen ascends it. Hansen's supporters repeated clash as Kostelic struggles to understand their loyalty. Kostelic sees Hansen undergo a physical and emotional breakdown, and realizes disabled people need to become more visible.

== Cast ==
- Victor Webster as Rick Hansen
- Jim Byrnes as Ivan Kostelic
- Jiayang Cheng as Little Boy
- Wei Dongzhen as Tai Chi Master
- Ethan Embry as Lee Gibson
- Zhang Fu as Lion Dancer
- Zhu Li as Musician
- Aleks Paunovic as Tim Frick
- Andrew Lee Potts as Don Alder
- Sarah-Jane Potts as Amanda Reid
- Yuna as Maylee

== Background ==
In 1998, Sherry Lansing, former CEO of Paramount Pictures, optioned the life rights to the story of Rick Hansen, a disabled man who pushed himself across the world in a wheelchair. As an athlete and advocate for social justice, Hansen wanted to realize the marginalized disabled community's potential. During the 1980s, Hansen was a world champion wheelchair racer who used his success to create the Man in Motion World Tour in 1985. During the tour, he wheeled himself 40,000 km (25,000 miles) through thirty-four countries, raising millions of dollars for spinal cord research and increasing the visibility of the disabled community.

Upon securing the story's rights, Lansing confirmed producers Mark Gordon, David Foster, and Michael French. Following two years of script development, Paramount decided not to produce the movie.

Producers decided to proceed independently as a theatrical film inspired by real-life events French witnessed in 1987 when he directed an eponymous Canadian television documentary in China, in which Rick Hansen was welcomed everywhere in China and completed "his impossible ascent of the Great Wall". This documentary introduced Lansing to a story she would later develop as a feature film as CEO of Paramount, Ms Lansing would develop as a feature film alongside Gordon, Foster, and French, all of whom had connections to the story. Foster, who after seeing news coverage of Rick Hansen pushing himself in a wheelchair, wrote the song "St. Elmo’s Fire" with John Parr.

The theatrical adaptation was filed primarily in China, starting in 2005, with assistance from the China Film Group and was screened extensively in China in 2008. Heart of a Dragon was limited to theatrical release in Canada in 2010, becoming available for streaming in the US by 2012.

== Production ==
Heart of a Dragon was filmed on location in Beijing and on the Great Wall of China. It was produced and directed by Michael French, and executive-produced by David Foster and Mark Gordon.
