= Sometimes They Come Back... for More =

- DVD cover
- Directed by: Daniel Zelik Berk
- Written by: Adam Grossman; Darryl Sollerh
- Based on: Characters by Stephen King
- Produced by: Diana Zahn; Daniel Zelik Berk
- Starring: Clayton Rohner; Faith Ford; Damian Chapa; Chase Masterson
- Cinematography: Christopher Walling
- Edited by: Todd Clark
- Music by: Brian Langsbard
- Distributed by: Trimark Pictures
- Release date: 1998
- Running time: 86 minutes
- Country: United States
- Language: English

Sometimes They Come Back... for More is the second straight-to-video sequel to Sometimes They Come Back, after Sometimes They Come Back... Again. The video was directed by Daniel Zelik Berk and released in 1998.

== Plot ==
The U.S. military has a secret illegal mining operation in Antarctica. When one of the personnel stationed at the base goes on a rampage, two military operatives, Capt. Sam Cage and Maj. Callie O'Grady, search the base by rappelling in via helicopter during stormy weather. They discover two survivors, medical officer Capt. Jennifer Wells and technical officer Lieut. Brian Shebanski. The base radio is mysteriously smashed.

Going into the mining area of the base, Capt. Cage sees what appears to be another survivor and starts a chase through the corridors, taking an elevator down to the second level. When Maj. O'Grady collapses because of the gases in the mine he takes her to an elevator, only to discover they are actually on the fourth level. Back in the main compound they discover that a body they had found in the snow has now moved and is gone. They find dead and dying personnel, and a book about conjuring the Devil. More bodies disappear when nobody's looking and reappear later as lurching menaces. Soon Jennifer and Sam find themselves the only ones still alive, fighting the undead and their diabolical master.

== Cast ==
- Clayton Rohner as Captain Sam Cage
- Faith Ford as Dr. Jennifer Wells
- Max Perlich as Lieutenant Brian Shebanski
- Chase Masterson as Major Callie O'Grady
- Damian Chapa as Dr. Karl Schilling
- Jennifer O'Dell as Mary
- Michael Stadvec as Captain Robert Reynolds
- Stephen Hart as Major Frank Whittaker
- Douglas Stoup as Lieutenant Baines
- Frank Ceglia as Soldier In Bar

== See also ==
- Project Iceworm - a top-secret United States Army program during the Cold War to build a network of mobile nuclear missile launch sites under the Greenland ice sheet.
