= High Tide (TV series) =

American syndicated TV series

- Genre: Detective fiction
- Created by: Jeff Franklin; Steve Waterman
- Starring: Rick Springfield; Yannick Bisson
- Composers: Eric Allaman (1994–1996); Alan Williams (1996–1997)
- Country of origin: United States
- Original language: English
- No. of seasons: 3
- No. of episodes: 72

Production
- Camera setup: Single-camera
- Running time: 60 minutes
- Production companies: Stu Segall Productions (season 2); Franklin/Waterman 2 Isambard Productions (season 1); Santa Barbara Studios (season 3); Columbia Pictures Television

Original release
- Network: Syndication
- Release: September 24, 1994 – May 25, 1997

High Tide is an American action adventure drama series created by Jeff Franklin and Steve Waterman and starring Rick Springfield and Yannick Bisson.

High Tide premiered in syndication on September 24, 1994 and ended on May 25, 1997, with a total of 72 episodes over the course of 3 seasons.

== Premise ==
Mick Barrett, a former police officer, works as a private detective with his younger brother Joey in San Diego. For their work, they travel to exotic locales and, in their free time, they are surfers. At the beginning of the series, they work primarily for Gordon, a retired CIA agent.

== Cast ==
=== Main / regular ===
- Rick Springfield as Mick Barrett (72 episodes)
- Yannick Bisson as Joey Barrett (72 episodes)
- Julie Lynn Cialini as Annie (25 episodes)
- George Segal as Gordon (22 episodes)
- Diana Frank as Fritz (21 episodes)
- Mary Ann Schmidt as Bikini Beauty (17 episodes)

=== Guests ===
- Andy Anderson as Brad Blair (1 episode)
- Antoinette Byron as Veronica (1 episode)
- Brian Krause as Jake (1 episode)
- Christopher Atkins as Raider (1 episode)
- Danielle Cormack as Jill McMillan / Meghan Kelly (2 episodes)
- Denise Richards as Alex (1 episode)
- Donna D'Errico as Blonde Waitress (1 episode)
- Erik Thomson as Charles Hart / Wilcox (2 episodes)
- Jay Laga'aia as Buck Walton (voice) (1 episode)
- John Bach as Boucher (1 episode)
- Josie Davis as Tina Chapman (1 episode)
- Julie Benz as Joanna Craig (1 episode)
- Kerry Armstrong as Valerie (1 episode)
- Krista Allen as Patti (3 episodes)
- Lani Tupu as Rev. Simon Henry (2 episodes)
- Lisa Crittenden (1 episode)
- Lisa Marie Scott as Dancer / Kim Tang (2 episodes)
- Lucy Lawless as Sharon List / Undercover Policewoman (3 episodes)
- Paul Chubb (1 episode)
- Rena Owen as Kara Gibson (1 episode)
- Simone Kessell as Young Tennis Star (2 episodes)
- Tanya Roberts as Rhonda Fogel (1 episode)
- Thomas Jane as Barry (1 episode)

== Episodes ==
=== Season 1 (1994–95) ===
No. overall	No. in season	Title	Directed by	Written by	Original release date
1	1	"Let Us Prey"	Seamus O'Neill	Tim Minear	September 24, 1994
2	2	"Beauty's Only Skin Deep"	Catherine Millar	Chris Baena	October 1, 1994
3	3	"Killer Wave"	John Wise	Tim Minear	October 8, 1994
4	4	"Party Time"	Catherine Millar	Tim Minear	October 15, 1994
5	5	"It Takes a Thief"	Mike Smith	Chris Baena	October 22, 1994
6	6	"Hot Rocks"	John Wise	Chris Baena	October 29, 1994
7	7	"Match Point"	Noah Ward	Tim Minear & Chris Baena	November 6, 1994
8	8	"Shanghaied"	Catherine Millar	Chris Baena & Tim Minear	November 12, 1994
9	9	"Tight Spot"	Unknown	Unknown	November 19, 1994
10	10	"Revenge is Sweet"	Catherine Millar	Martin Cutler & Tim Minear	November 26, 1994
11	11	"Sitting Ducks"	Brian Trenchard-Smith	Michael Fisher	December 11, 1994
12	12	"So You Wanna Be a Cop"	Rob Stewart	Chris Baena	December 17, 1994
13	13	"La Bamba"	John Wise	Chris Baena	January 21, 1995
14	14	"The Runaways"	Noah Ward	Michael Fisher	January 28, 1995
15	15	"A Clown Without Pity"	Rob Stewart	Tim Minear	February 4, 1995
16	16	"Cash Crop"	Catherine Millar	Tim Minear & Chris Baena	February 11, 1995
17	17	"Dead in the Water"	Rob Stewart	Tim Minear	February 18, 1995
18	18	"Road to Tiri Tiri"	Noah Ward	Tim Minear & Robert Patrick	February 25, 1995
19	19	"Regarding Joey"	Tim Minear	Tim Minear	March 4, 1995
20	20	"Pay Day"	John Wise	Chris Baena	March 25, 1995
21	21	"The Chase"	Noah Ward	Chris Baena	April 15, 1995
22	22	"Dead Heat"	Catherine Millar	Chris Baena	May 6, 1995
23	23	"Stalked"	Brian Trenchard-Smith & John Wise	Story by : Tim Minear; Teleplay by : Tim Minear & Catherine Miller	May 13, 1995

=== Season 2 (1995–96) ===
No. overall	No. in season	Title	Directed by	Written by	Original release date
24	1	"Personal Property"	Al Kind	Genia Shipman	September 23, 1995
25	2	"The Last Fight"	Pierre Elvis	Randy Anderson	September 30, 1995
26	3	"The Grind"	John Paragon	Chris Baena	October 7, 1995
27	4	"One on One"	James Lemmo	Timothy Scott Bogart	October 14, 1995
28	5	"Mermaid"	Joel Bender	Guy Toubes	October 21, 1995
29	6	"Barry"	John Paragon	Randy Anderson	October 28, 1995
30	7	"Down South"	John Grant Weil	Chris Baena	November 3, 1995
31	8	"Sea No Evil"	Corey Michael	Chris Baena	November 10, 1995
32	9	"Natural Born Surfers"	Robert Radler	James Hereth & Chris Baena	November 17, 1995
33	10	"Thank Heaven for Little Girls"	John Grant Weil	Tom Bogart & Chris Baena	November 24, 1995
34	11	"Bikini Patrol"	Joel Bender	Chris Baena	December 2, 1995
35	12	"The Curse of the High Tide"	Wings Hauser	Chris Baena	January 20, 1996
36	13	"Beach Blanket Werewolf"	Sean Christopher	Chris Baena	January 27, 1996
37	14	"A Three Hour Tour"	Robert Radler	Chris Baena	February 3, 1996
38	15	"Old Friends"	John Grant Weil	Chris Baena	February 10, 1996
39	16	"Out of the Ashes"	Fritz Kiersch	Rhonda Smiley	February 17, 1996
40	17	"Sunspirit"	Tyler Casey	Louise Kobrak & Darek Wells	February 24, 1996
41	18	"Code Name: Scorpion"	John Grant Weil	Chris Baena	March 2, 1996
42	19	"Sins of the Mother"	Robert Radler	Matthew Rosenberg & Rhonda Smiley	April 20, 1996
43	20	"Bad Influence"	Sean Christopher	Genia Shipman	April 27, 1996
44	21	"Anything, Anytime, Anywhere: Part 1"	John Paragon	Chris Baena	May 4, 1996
45	22	"Anything, Anytime, Anywhere: Part 2"	Robert Radler	Chris Baena	May 11, 1996
46	23	"Big Brother"	William Clark	Chris Baena	May 18, 1996
47	24	"Vintage Tide"	Rex Piano	Rhonda Smiley	May 25, 1996
48	25	"Dead Reckoning"	Rex Piano	Chris Baena	June 1, 1996

=== Season 3 (1996–97) ===
No. overall	No. in season	Title	Directed by	Written by	Original release date
49	1	"Starting Over"	Chris O'Neill	Chris Baena	September 21, 1996
50	2	"Deep Blue C-Notes"	Robert Radler	Chris Baena	September 28, 1996
51	3	"The Booster Club"	Robert Radler	Chris Baena	October 5, 1996
52	4	"Killshot"	Ron Stein	Chris Baena	October 12, 1996
53	5	"Goodbye, Mr. Chip"	Robert Radler	Chris Baena	October 19, 1996
54	6	"University Blues: Part 1"	Ron Stein & John Rubinstein	Timothy Scott Bogart & James Hereth & Guy Toubes	October 26, 1996
55	7	"University Blues: Part 2"	Ron Stein & John Rubinstein	Timothy Scott Bogart & James Hereth & Guy Toubes	November 2, 1996
56	8	"Sun, Surf and Homicide"	Jimmy Huston	Chris Baena	November 9, 1996
57	9	"Someone to Watch Over Me"	Joel Bender	Chris Baena	November 16, 1996
58	10	"Mission Improbable"	Jimmy Huston	Chris Baena	November 23, 1996
59	11	"Dr. Feelgood"	Rex Piano	Chris Baena	December 7, 1996
60	12	"Two Barretts and a Baby"	Jimmy Huston	James Hereth	January 18, 1997
61	13	"The Old Flame"	Rex Piano	Chris Baena	January 25, 1997
62	14	"Open House"	Jimmy Huston	Chris Baena	February 1, 1997
63	15	"Little Black Book"	Rex Piano	Chris Baena	February 8, 1997
64	16	"A Rock and a Hard Place"	Jimmy Huston	Chris Baena	February 15, 1997
65	17	"Big Stakeout at Oxnard"	Rex Piano	Chris Baena	February 22, 1997
66	18	"Girl On the Run"	Jimmy Huston	Chris Baena	March 1, 1997
67	19	"Desperate Friday"	Rex Piano	Alan Dybner	April 19, 1997
68	20	"Dead Men Don't Snore"	John Rubinstein	Chris Baena	April 26, 1997
69	21	"Ghost Story"	Rex Piano	Chris Baena	May 3, 1997
70	22	"A Stitch in Time"	Jimmy Huston	Chris Baena	May 10, 1997
71	23	"Up And Away"	Unknown	Unknown	May 17, 1997
72	24	"Memories"	Jimmy Huston	Chris Baena	May 24, 1997

== Production ==
George Segal appeared in a prominent recurring role in the first season, starting with the pilot. Though the first season was filmed in Auckland, New Zealand, the latter two seasons were filmed in California. Guest stars included Lucy Lawless, Sally Kirkland, Denise Richards, Thomas Jane, Patrick Wayne, and John Pinette.

== Availability ==
As of 2022, the series is available for streaming online on Crackle in the United States and the CTV Television Network's streaming service, CTV Throwback in Canada.
