= Dan Vs. =

American animated sitcom

- Genre: Animated sitcom Black comedy Surreal comedy
- Created by: Dan Mandel; Chris Pearson
- Voices of: Curtis Armstrong; Dave Foley; Paget Brewster
- Composer: Patrick Griffin
- Country of origin: United States
- Original language: English
- No. of seasons: 3
- No. of episodes: 53 + 1 short

Production
- Executive producers: Dan Angel; Jay Fukuto (Season 1); Dana Booton (Season 2–3); Chris Pearson (Season 3)
- Producer: Lizbeth Velasco
- Running time: 22 minutes
- Production companies: Film Roman; The Hatchery

Original release
- Network: The Hub
- Release: January 1, 2011 – March 9, 2013

Dan Vs. is an American animated sitcom created by Dan Mandel and Chris Pearson for the cable channel The Hub. The series stars Curtis Armstrong as Dan. Dave Foley and Paget Brewster also star as Chris and Elise, respectively.

The series ran for three seasons on The Hub from January 1, 2011, until March 9, 2013 with a total of 53 episodes and 1 short produced. The series was produced by Film Roman and The Hatchery.

== Plot ==
The show is about Dan, a jobless misanthrope with a soft spot for his cat, Mr. Mumbles, caught in odd misfortunes and unable to provide income for himself. Accompanying him is his better-off friend Chris, who lives in a comfortable home and has a steady income (he even reluctantly pays for the little or big expenses that Dan needs). His dull day-job and stressful work causes him to be unable to resist going along with Dan's wild plots to get even, despite how ridiculous they may seem. Even when Dan gets on his last nerve, he cannot abandon him, "knowing there is something worth saving in him". Both their friendship, stemming from a bad experience at summer camp, through high school these two, along with Chris' wife Elise, go after the things that make society even more unbearable than it already is. The third regular character is Elise, Chris's wife, who objects to Chris's participation in Dan's revenge quests, but, on occasion joins in due to some of Dan's plots sharing similarities with her childhood annoyances or her secret operative work for the government. Elise's character enables advanced help with some of Dan's revenge missions due to her skills and most of her missions act as a subplot in the show. The show is set primarily in the Los Angeles area, and background scenes often show notable landmarks in and around Los Angeles.

== Characters ==
=== Main ===
- Dan (voiced by Curtis Armstrong) is the main protagonist of the series. He is a very temperamental young man with extreme anger issues. In every episode, he plots revenge against anyone or anything which has enraged him with the help of his best friend Chris. Dan is shown in the episode "Dan" to have no last name.
- Chris (voiced by Dave Foley) is Dan's best friend and Elise's husband. He often gets dragged into Dan's schemes as his semi-reluctant accomplice, much to his dismay.
- Elise (voiced by Paget Brewster) is Chris' more levelheaded wife, who strongly dislikes Dan due to his rude and immature personality. She is also a spy working for an unnamed "quasi-governmental" secret organization.

=== Supporting ===
- Mr. Mumbles (vocals by Paget Brewster) is Dan's scraggy looking pet Bombay cat who is rescued in the episode "The Animal Shelter". Despite the name, Mr. Mumbles is actually female as it is implied Dan never bothered to check.
- Crunchy (voiced by Tom Kenny) is a happy-go-lucky, dreadlock-wearing hippie who works at several jobs throughout the series. His workplaces are often the target of Dan's hijinks.
- Sheriff (voiced by John DiMaggio) is a large, fat, tough police man who is seen every time Dan makes reports. Whenever Dan makes trouble, the sheriff uses a taser to shock him.
- Don (voiced by Michael Gross) is Elise's father who runs a successful cupcake store chain and hates Chris, to the point of trying to convince Elise to marry another man by various means (usually at Chris's expense).
- Elise Sr. (voiced by Meredith Baxter) is Elise's mother. She dislikes Chris, (but not quite as much as her husband) and she keeps her time and attention to an unspecified Mafia family, unbeknownst to her husband and daughter.
- Ninja Dave (voiced by Eric Bauza) is a former ninja of the Koshugi clan who swore never to bake cookies, thus had to steal them whenever he wanted to eat some and to destroy any rivals of his clan.
- Spy Boss (voiced by Dan Mandel) is the unnamed and unseen boss of Elise who sends her on different missions during specific episodes. It is revealed he is a former super model in the episode "The Common Cold".
- Hortence (voiced by Grey DeLisle) is an airhead employee of the Burgerphile restaurant chain who falls for Dan after he begins a protest against the restaurant.
- The Imposter (voiced by John C. McGinley) is an unnamed man who steals Dan's identity and impersonates him. He manipulates everyone around him and portrays himself as a "good neighbor" to steal Dan's life. He is later arrested for Dan's failure to serve jury duty, and swears revenge. He later returns in "The Telemarketer" where he continually harasses Dan with phone calls, and eventually gets Dan arrested.
- Ben (voiced by Eric Bauza) is Elise's younger brother and Chris' brother-in-law who was mentioned in the episodes "Elise's Parents" and "The Family Camping Trip" and appears in "The Family Thanksgiving" and "The Dinosaur". He seems to show a lack of distrust in Chris and has grown fond of him.
- Mechanic Mike (voiced by Kurtwood Smith) is Dan's local mechanic who works on his car free of charge since he loves working on off-brand Filipino cars.

== Voice actors ==
=== Main cast ===
Curtis Armstrong was chosen to voice the part of Dan from early production, as were Dave Foley and Paget Brewster who voice Chris and Elise, respectively.

=== Additional voices ===
The series employs many guest stars and recurring roles. Carlos Alazraqui portrays a balloon cult member in "New Mexico", both a surfer and a lifeguard in "The Beach", Maurice in "The Fancy Restaurant", Magnifico the Magnificent in "The Magician", and Flynn Goodhill in "Parents", among others. Matt Angel guest starred as a Burgerphile employee in "The Wedding". René Auberjonois is the voice of Chef Puree in "The Fancy Restaurant". Michael Gross and Meredith Baxter (of Family Ties fame) both play the voice of Elise's parents Don and Elise Sr. (respectively). Felicia Day voices the boss in her "titular episode". John DiMaggio plays the voice of a police officer in three episodes, Salvation Guy in “Salvation Armed Forces”, and a security guard in "baseball". Jenna Fischer voices Amber in "Anger Management". Judy Greer does the part of Jennifer in "The Neighbors". Seth Green does the voice of the mummy in his "titular episode". Ernie Hudson played the voice of the Camp Counselor in "Summer Camp".

Other guest stars include Clancy Brown, Mark Hamill, Tom Kenny, Bill Kopp, Kevin McDonald, John C. McGinley, Daran Norris, Carlos Alazraqui, Kurtwood Smith, Cree Summer, Harland Williams, and Henry Winkler for various parts.

== Episodes ==
The series premiered on January 1, 2011, on The Hub, and ended its first season on July 9, 2011. The second season began on November 19, 2011, and ended on June 23, 2012. The third and final season premiered on November 17, 2012, and ended on March 9, 2013.

| Season | Episodes | Originally released | |
| Season | Episodes | First released | Last released |
|---|---|---|---|
| 1 | 22 | January 1, 2011 | July 9, 2011 |
| 2 | 18 | November 19, 2011 | June 23, 2012 |
| 3 | 13 | November 17, 2012 | March 9, 2013 |

=== Season 1 (2011) ===
| No. overall | No. in season | Title | Directed by | Written by | Original release date | Prod. code |
|---|---|---|---|---|---|---|
| 1 | 1 | "Dan Vs. New Mexico" | Brian Sheesley | Dan Mandel & Chris Pearson | January 1, 2011 | 101 |
When Dan's grudge against New Mexico goes over the limit, he, Chris (his best friend), and Elise (his best friend's wife) go on a road trip to New Mexico to get revenge against the state.
| 2 | 2 | "Dan Vs. The Wolf-Man" | Bill Kopp | Dan Mandel & Chris Pearson | January 1, 2011 | 102 |
After Dan's car is damaged by an unknown animal, Dan concludes that the only possible culprit is the Wolf-Man, and vows revenge. Note: This was considered the first episode on The Complete First Season DVD and on Amazon Prime Video.
| 3 | 3 | "Dan Vs. The Dentist" | Brian Sheesley | Dan Mandel & Chris Pearson | January 8, 2011 | 104 |
When one of Dan's teeth is knocked out in an accident involving a stuffed bear he got from his dentist when he was a child, Dan concludes it was the dentist's fault and sets out to prove the man is evil. Guest star: Mark Hamill as Dan's dentist, Dr. Pullem
| 4 | 4 | "Dan Vs. The Ninja" | Bill Kopp | Dan Mandel & Chris Pearson | January 15, 2011 | 103 |
Dan's outrage over stolen cookies leads to the discovery of a ninja vendetta against Elise.
| 5 | 5 | "Dan Vs. The Animal Shelter" | Bill Kopp | Dan Mandel & Chris Pearson | January 22, 2011 | 105 |
When loud noises from the animal shelter across the street keep Dan awake at night, he sets out to destroy the shelter once and for all. Chris's help however, hinders the plan after he accidentally eats Dan's poisoned meatloaf. First appearance of Mr. Mumbles.
| 6 | 6 | "Dan Vs. Canada" | Brian Sheesley | Dan Mandel & Chris Pearson | January 29, 2011 | 106 |
After an incident involving maple syrup, Dan and Chris go on a road trip to get even with their friendly neighbor to the north, Canada.
| 7 | 7 | "Dan Vs. Traffic" | Bill Kopp | Dan Mandel & Chris Pearson | February 26, 2011 | 107 |
When Dan suffers an embarrassing accident due to being stuck in traffic, he sets out to stop gridlock for good. Guest star: Henry Winkler as Helicopter Hal
| 8 | 8 | "Dan Vs. Ye Olde Shakespeare Dinner Theatre" | Bill Kopp | Dan Mandel & Chris Pearson | March 5, 2011 | 108 |
Displeased with the quality of a Shakespeare performance at a local dinner theater, Dan decides the only solution is to shut the theater down.
| 9 | 9 | "Dan Vs. Baseball" | Brian Sheesley | Dan Mandel & Chris Pearson | March 12, 2011 | 109 |
After some rowdy baseball fans break his wing mirror and the World Series preempts his favourite television show, Dan heads up to Washington, DC with intents on extracting vengeance on the Commissioner of Baseball.
| 10 | 10 | "Dan Vs. The Salvation Armed Forces" | Bill Kopp | Tom Saunders | March 19, 2011 | 110 |
Dan goes to war with The Salvation Armed Forces after his car is accidentally donated to charity.
| 11 | 11 | "Dan Vs. The Beach" | Brian Sheesley | Kirill Baru & Eric Zimmerman | March 26, 2011 | 111 |
Dan tries to destroy the beach after a crowd of tourists damages his car.
| 12 | 12 | "Dan Vs. George Washington" | Bill Kopp | Dan Mandel & Chris Pearson | April 2, 2011 | 112 |
After a tree falls on top of Dan's car, evidence left behind leads Dan to blame George Washington for chopping it down, and he sets out to find a way to get revenge on the long-dead President.
| 13 | 13 | "Dan Vs. Technology" | Brian Sheesley | Dan Mandel & Chris Pearson | April 9, 2011 | 113 |
After Dan's brand-new computer becomes obsolete right when it needs to be repaired, Dan heads out to Silicon Valley to take down Barry Ditmer, the CEO of the tech company that produced it. Meanwhile, Elise gets assigned to protect Ditmer from an unidentified threatening caller (Dan), until he decides to use Elise as the first subject of his mind control technology, turning her into his slave. Guest starring: Kevin McDonald as Barry Ditmer and Harland Williams as Hiram
| 14 | 14 | "Dan Vs. The Barber" | Bill Kopp | Dan Mandel & Chris Pearson | April 16, 2011 | 114 |
Dan swears revenge against his barber after he gives Dan a bad haircut as he prepared for a date with his new girlfriend Becky. Things get out of hand when barbers begin attacking Dan, and the only way out is to duel with his barber, who happens to be Becky's father. Now Dan must choose between love and vengeance. Guest star: Cree Summer as Becky
| 15 | 15 | "Dan Vs. Art" | Brian Sheesley | Kirill Baru & Eric Zimmerman | April 23, 2011 | 115 |
Dan tries to destroy the artist who decorated his car without asking permission.
| 16 | 16 | "Dan Vs. Elise's Parents" | Bill Kopp | Dan Mandel & Chris Pearson | May 14, 2011 | 116 |
When a visit from Elise's parents prevents him and Chris from going to the Renaissance Faire, Dan plots to get revenge on them by incriminating Elise's dad in mafia activities. Guest starring: Michael Gross and Meredith Baxter (from Family Ties) as the voice of Elise's parents Don and Elise Sr. (respectively)
| 17 | 17 | "Dan Vs. The Fancy Restaurant" | Brian Sheesley | Tom Saunders | May 21, 2011 | 117 |
Perturbed by the recent closure of his favourite sandwich shop, Dan vows to take down the high-class restaurant that replaced it. Guest star: René Auberjonois as Chef Puree
| 18 | 18 | "Dan Vs. Dan" | Brian Sheelsey | Dan Mandel & Chris Pearson | May 28, 2011 | 118 |
Dan returns home from a court appearance to find that a stranger has moved into his apartment and stolen his identity, but the worst part is that this "Imposter Dan" is living Dan's life as a friendly, well adjusted and helpful guy. Dan plots to get rid of the imposter and get his life back. Guest star: John C. McGinley as Imposter Dan
| 19 | 19 | "Dan Vs. The Family Camping Trip" | Bill Kopp | Dan Mandel & Chris Pearson | June 4, 2011 | 119 |
When Chris decides to go on a camping trip with Elise and her family instead of hanging out with Dan, Dan vows to ruin the trip for everyone. But complications arrive when an insane chainsaw-wielding maniac arrives at the campsite and Dan and the maniac go head-to-head. Meanwhile, a paranoid Chris, scared by a film Dan showed him based on the maniac's massacre, must prove himself to Elise's parents who invited Elise's ex-boyfriend Colby. Guest starring: Meredith Baxter and Michael Gross as Elise's parents and Daran Norris as Colby
| 20 | 20 | "Dan Vs. Burgerphile" | Brian Sheesley | Dan Mandel & Chris Pearson | June 18, 2011 | 120 |
When a fast food restaurant gets Dan's order wrong and the megalomaniac manager, Jeff, refuses to correct his mistake, Dan chains himself to the restaurant counter as a protest, inadvertently attracting the attention of the cashier, Hortence, who is attracted to "determined men". Note: Jeff's name is the same as his voice actor Jeff Bennett.
| 21 | 21 | "Dan Vs. The Magician" | Bill Kopp | Kirill Baru & Eric Zimmerman | June 25, 2011 | 121 |
When a street magician named Magnifico the Magnificent publicly reveals Dan's underwear and steals a necklace Chris was planning to give to Elise, Dan sets out to prove all magicians are frauds, with Chris in tow to try to get the necklace back.
| 22 | 22 | "Dan Vs. The Lemonade Stand Gang" | Brian Sheesley | Dan Mandel & Chris Pearson | July 9, 2011 | 122 |
Dan starts a crusade against a gang of thuggish children who aggressively sell lemonade outside his apartment building.

=== Season 2 (2011–12) ===
| No. overall | No. in season | Title | Directed by | Written by | Original release date | Prod. code |
|---|---|---|---|---|---|---|
| 23 | 1 | "Dan Vs. The Family Thanksgiving" | Stephanie Arnett | Dan Mandel | November 19, 2011 | 201 |
Dan is surprised when he's invited to Elise's parents house for a family Thanksgiving along with Chris, but vows to ruin it when he learns that Elise's parents only invited him to steal his deviled egg recipe.
| 24 | 2 | "Dan Vs. The Mall Santa" | Ashley Lenz | Chris Pearson | December 17, 2011 | 202 |
When Dan and Chris land jobs at the mall's Christmas display, Dan swears revenge on a curmudgeonly mall Santa who despises Christmas. Meanwhile, Elise is assigned by the secret agency to take down the assassin under the codename of "The Snowman".
| 25 | 3 | "Dan Vs. The Neighbors" | Stephanie Arnett | Chris Pearson | January 28, 2012 | 203 |
Dan fears his new neighbors are cannibals plotting to eat him, so he tries to run them out of town.
| 26 | 4 | "Dan Vs. Dancing" | Stephanie Arnett | Dan Mandel | February 4, 2012 | 204 |
When Dan goes on an anti-dance crusade, he ends up interfering with Chris and Elise's plan to enter a dance contest. Elise then exiles him to a ghost town populated by feral dancers, where he must learn the ancient art of "fight-dancing" to survive.
| 27 | 5 | "Dan Vs. The Bank" | Ashley Lenz | Chris Pearson | February 11, 2012 | 205 |
When Dan's bank increases his ATM fees, he decides, with the help of Chris (unwillingly) and Elise (so she can obtain enough money to take a weaponized virus off the black market on behalf of the government), to stage a heist and get the money back. Guest starring: Tara Strong as the bank manager.
| 28 | 6 | "Dan Vs. The Monster Under the Bed" | Stephanie Arnett | Chris Pearson | February 18, 2012 | 206 |
Dan, Chris and Elise try to get rid of the monster underneath Dan's bed, but there may be more to this monster than meets Dan's eye. Note: When Dan drives to Canada, he sees that the country still hasn't recovered from that avalanche he caused from the episode "Canada".
| 29 | 7 | "Dan Vs. Golf" | Ashley Lenz | Bruce Ferber, Kirill Baru, & Eric Zimmerman | February 25, 2012 | 207 |
Chris shirks his responsibilities to go golfing with his boss Mr. Bambridge, so Dan and Elise team up to put an end to his new hobby.
| 30 | 8 | "Dan Vs. The Gym" | Stephanie Arnett | Dan Mandel | March 3, 2012 | 208 |
Dan gets tricked into signing up for a long-term gym membership, and while fighting it, uncovers an alarming conspiracy.
| 31 | 9 | "Dan Vs. The Wedding" | Stephanie Arnett | Chris Pearson | March 24, 2012 | 209 |
Upset that his old flame Hortence is marrying her boss, Jeremiah Burger, Dan cons his way into the wedding party and attempts to ruin the wedding from within.
| 32 | 10 | "Dan Vs. The Catburglar" | Ashley Lenz | Kirill Baru & Eric Zimmerman | March 31, 2012 | 210 |
Dan's cat Mr. Mumbles goes missing, drawing him into a film noir-style caper, and the arms of a captivating, mysterious woman.
| 33 | 11 | "Dan Vs. The Dinosaur" | Stephanie Arnett | Kirill Baru & Eric Zimmerman | April 7, 2012 | 211 |
A rampaging dinosaur destroys Dan's car, so he and Chris partner up with a famous hunter to capture it.
| 34 | 12 | "Dan Vs. Stupidity" | Ashley Lenz | Chris Pearson | April 14, 2012 | 212 |
Believing that everyone around him is becoming dumber, Dan blames the state education system and swears revenge on the Governor.
| 35 | 13 | "Dan Vs. The Telemarketer" | Stephanie Arnett | Chris Pearson | May 19, 2012 | 213 |
Dan plots to end the persistent phone calls of a telemarketer.
| 36 | 14 | "Dan Vs. Reality TV" | Ashley Lenz | Kirill Baru & Eric Zimmerman | May 26, 2012 | 214 |
Dan tries to ruin Reality TV after he's humiliated by a producer named Buddy Starr, but he still wants to win the trip to Astronaut Sleepaway Camp.
| 37 | 15 | "Dan Vs. Parents" | Ashley Lenz | Kirill Baru & Eric Zimmerman | June 2, 2012 | 215 |
Displays of poor parenting motivates Dan to adopt a child of his own to prove he could be a terrific dad.
| 38 | 16 | "Dan Vs. Gigundo-Mart" | Stephanie Arnett | Melody Fox | June 9, 2012 | 216 |
Dan wants to drive a new superstore out of business, because it's hurting his favorite stores and encouraging Chris to purchase too many items in bulk.
| 39 | 17 | "Dan Vs. Chris" | Stephanie Arnett | Chris Pearson, Kirill Baru, & Eric Zimmerman | June 16, 2012 | 222 |
Dan and Chris battle over a piece of sci-fi film memorabilia that may destroy their friendship.
| 40 | 18 | "Dan Vs. Wild West Town" | Ashley Lenz | Kirill Baru & Eric Zimmerman | June 23, 2012 | 217 |
Dan goes to a low quality dude ranch where he discovers he can't get a refund.

=== Season 3 (2012–13) ===
| No. overall | No. in season | Title | Directed by | Written by | Original release date | Prod. code |
|---|---|---|---|---|---|---|
| 41 | 1 | "Dan Vs. Anger Management" | Ashley Lenz | Chris Pearson | November 17, 2012 | 301 |
Dan is forced to take a course in anger management to control his destructive instincts, and finds a kindred spirit in the mild-mannered, but incredibly unstable class instructor named Amber. Guest starring: Jenna Fischer as Amber
| 42 | 2 | "Dan Vs. The Mummy" | James Krenzke | Brian Turner & Garrett Frawley | November 24, 2012 | 302 |
When the object of Dan's revenge turns out to be a laid back undead Egyptian king who won't leave him alone, Dan resorts to some ancient means of pest control. Guest starring: Seth Green as the Mummy
| 43 | 3 | "Dan Vs. The Boss" | Stephanie Arnett | Chris Pearson | December 1, 2012 | 218 |
When Dan is forced to get a temp job to pay his rent, his aggressive behavior helps him climb the corporate ladder. Guest starring: Felicia Day as the boss
| 44 | 4 | "Dan Vs. The Mechanic" | Stephanie Arnett | Chris Pearson | December 8, 2012 | 303 |
Dan learns that his mechanic called Mechanic Mike has been using parts of Dan's car to build a giant robot and he gets in on the action for revenge. Guest starring: Kurtwood Smith as Mechanic Mike
| 45 | 5 | "Dan Vs. The High School Reunion" | Stephanie Arnett | Melody Fox & Tim Shell | December 15, 2012 | 304 |
Dan plans to pull the ultimate prank on his high school reunion out of revenge for not inviting him.
| 46 | 6 | "Dan Vs. The Common Cold" | Ashley Lenz | Kirill Baru & Eric Zimmerman | January 19, 2013 | 219 |
Dan heads to the Department of Controlling Diseases in hopes of ridding the world from the common cold.
| 47 | 7 | "Dan Vs. The DMV" | Ashley Lenz | Chris Pearson | January 26, 2013 | 305 |
When Dan is categorized as a difficult case for a routine traffic issue, he must use all his wits and driving skills to renew his license.
| 48 | 8 | "Dan Vs. The Ski Trip" | Ashley Lenz | Kirill Baru & Eric Zimmerman | February 2, 2013 | 220 |
A sudden blizzard strands Dan inside an isolated cabin with Elise while Chris kicks back and drinks hot cocoa with newfound friends.
| 49 | 9 | "Dan Vs. Jury Duty" | James Krenzke | Chris Pearson | February 9, 2013 | 306 |
Dan serves on jury duty and empathizes with the defendant in a trial, so he plots to get a non-guilty verdict. Note: This is the only time someone shouts the episode title along with Dan (Elise wasn't happy about getting Jury Duty either).
| 50 | 10 | "Dan Vs. Vegetables" | Ashley Lenz | Chris Pearson | February 16, 2013 | 221 |
Dan's favorite burger joint, Burgerphile, starts serving vegetables instead of burgers and french fries, so he goes on a mission to eradicate vegetables from the city.
| 51 | 11 | "Dan Vs. The Superhero" | Stephanie Arnett | Kirill Baru & Eric Zimmerman | February 23, 2013 | 307 |
A superhero damages Dan's car, so he becomes a villain to defeat the reckless crimefighter.
| 52 | 12 | "Dan Vs. The Family Cruise" | James Krenzke | Brian Turner & Garrett Frawley | March 2, 2013 | 308 |
Dan can't escape the ship's never ending family activities. Meanwhile Elise and Elise Sr. come into conflict in their alter egos over a diamond which Elise is trying to protect from Elise Sr.
| 53 | 13 | "Dan Vs. Summer Camp" | Ashley Lenz | Chris Pearson & Amy Blaisdell | March 9, 2013 | 309 |
Dan and Chris recount their first adventure together as friends, meeting in summer camp and joining forces to take on a bullying camp counselor bent on making their young lives miserable.

== Shorts ==
In addition, a short premiered on HubWorld.com and during commercial breaks on The Hub on the same day the first 2 episodes aired.

| Season | Episodes | Originally released | |
| Season | Episodes | First released | Last released |
|---|---|---|---|
| 0 | 1 Short | January 1, 2011 | January 1, 2011 |

| No. overall | No. in season | Title | Directed by | Written by | Original release date | Prod. code |
|---|---|---|---|---|---|---|
| 0 | 0 | "Dan Vs. Pinkie Pie" | N/A | N/A | January 1, 2011 | N/A |
Dan sees that his car has been painted pink and bedazzled, so he vows revenge on Pinkie Pie for doing so to it. Guest star: Andrea Libman as Pinkie Pie from My Little Pony: Friendship Is Magic

== Production ==
Mandel's original idea was for the show to be a live-action sitcom, but new possibilities opened up once they started development for an animated series. The show was pitched to various networks, including Adult Swim.

Series creators Dan Mandel and Chris Pearson conceived the personalities of the main characters Dan and Chris by loosely basing them on their own negative qualities. He has stated that the show's self-mockery with the character Dan was in part inspired by the works of Evan Dorkin. Pearson once stated that he thought of the Dan character as "Calvin [from Calvin and Hobbes] as a grownup, if his life had gone horribly wrong somewhere."

The series is animated in Adobe Flash. The design for the characters was handled by a team of artists led by supervising director Matt Danner with some involvement from Mandel and Pearson. The vocal cast was selected through an audition first consisting of pre-recorded voice-overs, followed by several rounds of callbacks. Curtis Armstrong stood out prominently to the creators as the voice of Dan from the beginning of the process. The idea to have Meredith Baxter and Michael Gross portray Elise's parents Elise Sr. and Don came from executive producer Jay Fukuto, who had worked with them during their time together on Family Ties. Co-creator Dan Mandel does many voices in the series.

=== Cancellation ===
On October 17, 2013, Armstrong announced on his Facebook page that the show has been canceled. His statement read:

Christian Paredes, James Jones and Larry Reaper, among others, have been kind enough to ask about Dan Vs., the animated series I've been doing for the last few seasons on The Hub. It was created by Chris Pearson and Dan Mandel and also starred Dave Foley and Paget Brewster, giving truly funny performances as Dan's best friend and wife respectively. Dan Vs. actually won an Emmy this year for direction for Dan Angel and was among my favorite past times. It has been canceled, for the baffling and inexplicable reasons that shows like Dan Vs. get canceled. I can't really explain it because it has never been explained to me. Occasionally I would ask about the status of the show and be told that it wasn't canceled, but when I would ask about specifics, there would be long, awkward pauses and then changes to other subjects, like the weather or the possibility of a government shut down (this was the previous government shutdown, which gives you an idea how long this has been going on.) Finally, I had to just give up and move on with my life. This is actually not uncommon in my business. Things just sort of fade away, with an noticeable absence of closure. You can't help dwelling on it for a time, but eventually the whole thing just becomes a sort of fragrant memory. Some fragrances, of course, are sweeter than others: I'm happy to say that in the case of Dan Vs., they are, pretty much across the board, sweet. I loved everyone I worked with, the company was great, the network was supportive and, of course, the fans were rabid and vocal in their enthusiasm. The checks cleared, it's out on DVD and it was fun and you can't really ask for more than that.

== Broadcast and home media ==
Dan Vs. premiered on The Hub on January 1, 2011 with the final episode aired on March 9, 2013. After the series ended, reruns continued to air on the channel until October 3, 2014.

In March 2012, Starz and Anchor Bay Entertainment licensed the home video rights to the series in the United States and Canada. The entire first season was released on DVD on July 17, 2012. This is a 3-disc set, which contains all 22 episodes of the first season and includes an animatic of the episode "Burgerphile".

As of 2025, all 53 episodes of Dan Vs. are available for free on YouTube, Tubi, and The Roku Channel in the United States, as well as Crave via its Starz subscription in Canada. The series was added to Amazon Prime Video in December 2020 and has been on and off the platform since. In Australia, it is available on Network 10's streaming service 10 Play.

== Awards and nominations ==
| Year | Award | Category | Nominee | Result |
|---|---|---|---|---|
| 2012 | 39th Annie Awards | Character Design in a Television Production | Chris Battle | Nominated |
| 2012 | 39th Annie Awards | Directing in a Television Production | Brian Sheesley | Nominated |
| 2013 | 40th Daytime Emmy Awards | Outstanding Special Class Animated Program | Dan Angel, Dana Booton, Chris Pearson, Dan Mandel, Brian Sheesley, Lizbeth Velasco, Taesoo Kim, Producers | Nominated |
| 2013 | 40th Daytime Creative Arts Emmy Awards | Outstanding Performer in an Animated Program | Curtis Armstrong as Dan | Nominated |
| 2013 | 40th Daytime Creative Arts Emmy Awards | Outstanding Directing in an Animated Program | Brian Sheesley, Stephanie Arnett, Ashley Lenz, James Krenzke and Hyeonsu Park | Won |
| 2014 | 41st Daytime Creative Arts Emmy Awards | Outstanding Special Class Animated Program | Dan Angel, Dana Booton, Chris Pearson, Dan Mandel, Brian Sheesley, Taesoo Kim and Lizbeth Velasco | Nominated |
| 2014 | 41st Daytime Creative Arts Emmy Awards | Outstanding Directing in an Animated Program | Brian Sheesley, Stephanie Arnett, James Krenzke, Ashley Lenz and Hyeonsu Park | Nominated |
