= Discovery Family =

American cable television channel

- The network's logo since October 13, 2014; currently used as a on-screen bug and in older promotional advertising. The newer logo below, inaugurated in 2024, is used in promotions and as an electronic program guide identifier.

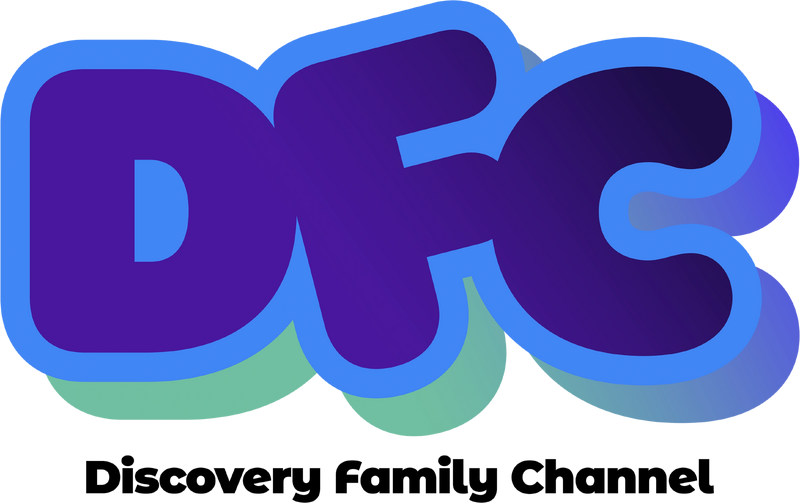
- Country: United States
- Broadcast area: Nationwide
- Headquarters: New York City, New York, U.S.

Programming
- Languages: English; Spanish (via SAP audio track)
- Picture format: 1080i HDTV

Ownership
- Parent: Skydance (60%); Hasbro Entertainment (40%)
- Key people: Michael Ouweleen (president)
- Sister channels: List: Adult Swim; Boomerang; Cartoon Network; Cartoonito; Discovery Familia

History
- Launched: October 22, 1996; 30 years ago (as Discovery Kids); October 10, 2010; 16 years ago (as The Hub Network); October 13, 2014; 12 years ago (as Discovery Family)
- Former names: Discovery Kids Channel (1996–2001); Discovery Kids (2001–2010); The Hub (2010–2013); Hub Network (2013–2014)

Links
- Website: www.skydance.com/about/brands/discovery-family-channel/

Discovery Family (known on-air as Discovery Family Channel, abbreviated as DFC) is an American cable television channel co-owned by Skydance and Hasbro Entertainment.

The channel was launched on October 22, 1996 by Discovery Communications (later Discovery, Inc.) as Discovery Kids Channel (later Discovery Kids), a child-oriented offshoot of Discovery Channel featuring science, nature, and adventure-themed programs. In 2010, Discovery Kids was re-launched as The Hub (later Hub Network) through a joint venture with Hasbro led by veteran executive Margaret Loesch. The re-launch pivoted the channel towards a general entertainment format, with dayparts targeting preschool, youth, and family audiences. Hasbro-owned properties served as the basis for several of The Hub's original programs, including game show versions of board games and animated series linked to toy lines like My Little Pony, Littlest Pet Shop, Pound Puppies, Transformers, and Kaijudo.

After Loesch resigned in 2014, Discovery acquired a larger stake in the Hub Network and rebranded it as Discovery Family; while Hasbro continued to program the channel's daytime lineup, its primetime lineup now features a mixture of series from Discovery's other networks. The 2022 merger of Discovery, Inc. with WarnerMedia to form Warner Bros. Discovery, followed by its 2026 acquisition by Paramount Skydance to form Skydance Corporation, has brought Discovery Family under common ownership with fellow children's networks Cartoon Network and Nickelodeon. Michael Ouweleen currently oversees Discovery Family and Cartoon Network.

As of November 2023, Discovery Family is available to approximately 28 million pay television households in the United States, down from its peak of 73 million households in 2013.

== History ==
=== As Discovery Kids (1996–2010) ===
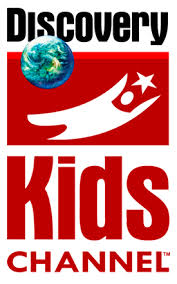
First logo used from October 22, 1996 until 1997

Discovery Communications launched Discovery Kids Channel on October 22, 1996, as part of a suite of four new digital cable channels that included Discovery Travel & Living Network, Discovery Civilization Network, and Discovery Science Network. Upon its launch, the channel primarily offered adventure, nature, and science-themed programs aimed towards a children's audience between ages 6 and 11. Marjorie Kaplan, the network's senior vice president, explained that the creation of Discovery Kids Channel was influenced primarily by children, who were watching its parent network's programming together with their parents.

From 1996 to 2000, Discovery Kids Channel was carried by only a select few cable television providers. In 2001, the channel shortened its name to Discovery Kids and, by the end of the year, was carried in at least 15 million homes. In September 2001, a Canadian version of Discovery Kids was launched in partnership with Corus Entertainment.

In December 2001, Discovery Kids announced a partnership with NBC, in which it would produce a new Saturday morning block for the network known as Discovery Kids on NBC, beginning in September 2002. The block replaced TNBC, a teen-oriented block consisting of live-action shows and sitcoms, and featured programming that met the educational programming guidelines from the U.S. Federal Communications Commission (FCC). It included new original series (such as the reality television series Endurance), existing Discovery Kids programming, and children's spin-offs of programs from sister networks, such as Animal Planet and Discovery Channel.

With the launch of the new block, Discovery Kids also branched out into original animated programming with the premieres of Kenny the Shark and Tutenstein. In March 2006, Discovery declined to renew its contract with NBC for its Saturday morning block, citing a desire to focus exclusively on the Discovery Kids channel. Since the launch of the NBC block, Discovery Kids had grown its cable carriage to over 43 million homes. NBC would replace the Discovery Kids block with Qubo in September 2006.

=== As The Hub/Hub Network (2010–2014) ===
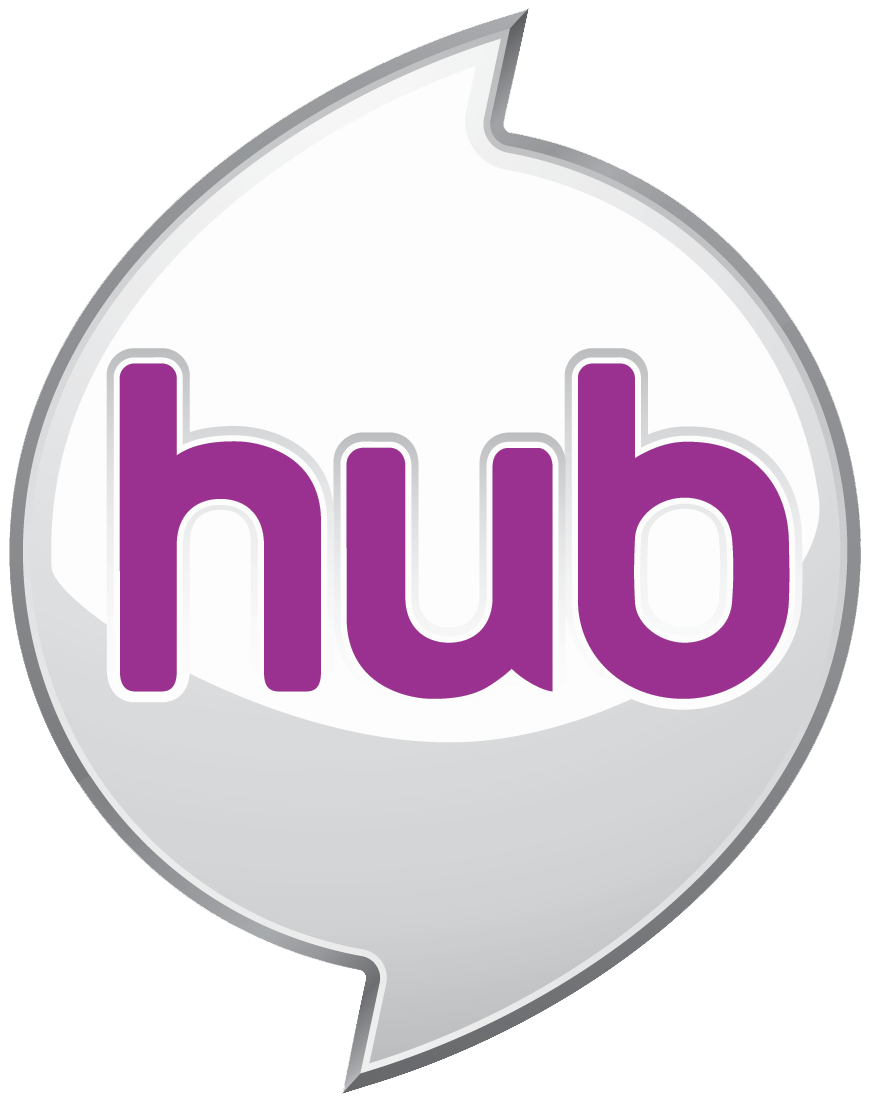
The Hub's original logo, used until 2014. A variant with the text "Network" was introduced in 2013.

==== Development ====
On April 30, 2009, toy manufacturer and media company Hasbro announced that it would form a joint venture with Discovery Communications to re-launch Discovery Kids as a new, family-oriented television channel. Hasbro paid $300 million for a 50% ownership stake in the channel, along with an additional investment of $371,783,000 in the joint venture.

Under the arrangement, Discovery would oversee advertising sales and distribution for the new channel, while Hasbro would be in charge of acquiring and producing programming. While the network aimed to maintain educational series (including those carried over from Discovery Kids), plans called for original programs based on Hasbro-owned franchises, such as G.I. Joe, My Little Pony, Transformers, as well as game shows adapted from its board game brands. Discovery believed that partnering with Hasbro would attract better-quality advertisers to the channel.

In July 2009, the joint venture appointed veteran television executive Margaret Loesch as its president and chief executive officer. Loesch had previously served as president of Fox Kids from 1990 to 1997, and at Marvel Productions from 1984 to 1990. In her tenure at Marvel, she assisted the production of several Hasbro tie-in series, including My Little Pony and The Transformers.

In January 2010, Discovery and Hasbro announced that the new network would be known as The Hub; two months later, the companies announced that The Hub would launch on October 10. Its first branding was developed by Troika Design Group, and built around a logo nicknamed the "hubble"—designed to embody a "catalyst of action and imagination". The final logo design was the result of numerous drafts by Troika designers, some of which incorporated typography similar to Hasbro's logo.

==== Programming and goals ====
The Hub would continue targeting Discovery Kids' main demographic of children aged 2–14 (a market which staff felt was being abandoned by its competitors, such as Nickelodeon and Disney Channel, in favor of tweens), but also planned to feature a primetime block with family-oriented programming. Some of the channel's launch series included the game show Family Game Night; animated series Pound Puppies, My Little Pony: Friendship Is Magic, and Deltora Quest; reruns of the Jim Henson series Fraggle Rock, and the preschool-oriented programs Animal Mechanicals and The WotWots. The channel promised to keep the proportion of programs supplied from Hasbro to "less than 20%" of the total of its programming.

In compliance with the Children's Television Act (CTA), The Hub was to air six minutes of advertisements per hour during programs aimed at preschoolers, a minimum of 12 minutes per hour during weekday programming, and a minimum of 10.5 minutes on weekends. Throughout the week, the channel would air 10.5 minutes of advertisements per hour, a policy carried over from the Discovery Kids era. The Hub planned to sell advertising space to toy companies aside from Hasbro; as reported by Advertising Age in May 2010, the channel was even in talks with Mattel, a major competitor to Hasbro in the toy industry. The Hub, however, also planned to restrict specific categories of advertisements, particularly those promoting junk food and products high in sugar.

A vocal opponent of The Hub was the Campaign for a Commercial-Free Childhood (CCFC), founded by Susan Linn, who expressed concern that Hasbro would exploit the channel as a marketing vehicle for its products. Ahead of the re-launch, the CCFC called the project an "infomercial" and stated they would closely monitor the channel. At the announcement of Discovery and Hasbro's joint venture in April 2009, Linn declared that it would "make a mockery of existing ad limits and the current prohibition of product placement in children's television". She reiterated this sentiment days before the re-launch, telling the Los Angeles Times that "[t]he notion of a toy company owning a television channel for the sole purpose of promoting their toys is egregious practice". In response, Loesch stated that The Hub's goal was to be "vibrant" and "diverse" in its programming, and pointed out that animated series not commissioned by toy companies would still see their merchandise released regardless. Loesch also said that Hasbro was partnering with Discovery Communications for the channel, and declared "we have programming from them and are using their DNA".

==== Launch and later years ====
To promote The Hub, previews of Cosmic Quantum Ray, The Twisted Whiskers Show, and Family Game Night aired on Science Channel, Animal Planet, and TLC, respectively. Discovery Kids was re-launched as The Hub at 10:00 a.m. ET, following a four-hour marathon of Kenny the Shark. The first program to air on the new channel was The Twisted Whiskers Show, followed by episodes of Dennis and Gnasher, Cosmic Quantum Ray, Atomic Betty, and the 2004 film Garfield: The Movie.

In a June 2011 debt filing with the Securities and Exchange Commission, Discovery Communications indicated that the channel may be worth less than recently believed, based on low viewership figures. The management of The Hub subsequently underwent a fair value analysis of the channel. A Discovery Communications spokesperson considered the action to be "a pro-forma accounting exercise", and noted that Discovery felt "very positive and encouraged by The Hub's early days' performance, and ability to grow its audience in the future."

Final Hub Network logo, used from January 13 to October 13, 2014.

In March 2013, The Hub picked up Stan Lee's Mighty 7, an animated pilot film that aired on February 1, 2014. The network also began to phase in an amended branding as the Hub Network. On January 13, 2014, Hub Network introduced an updated logo and a new imaging campaign, "Making Family Fun", which was developed by the Los Angeles–based agency Oishii Creative.

=== As Discovery Family (2014–present) ===
On June 12, 2014, it was reported that Margaret Loesch would resign from her role as Hub Network president and CEO by the end of the year. On September 17, 2014, The Wall Street Journal reported that Discovery Communications was preparing to acquire a controlling stake in Hub Network from Hasbro, then rebrand it as Discovery Family. Along with Discovery's CFO Andrew Warren, Hasbro staff acknowledged that increasing competition in the children's media landscape ― especially by subscription video-on-demand services such as Netflix — had affected the network's overall performance and Hasbro's original content. As it was majority-owned by a competitor, other major toy companies such as Mattel refused to purchase advertising time on Hub Network, affecting its ability to air advertising that targeted its main audience; by 2014, the network had made only $9 million per year. Discovery staff was also unable to display a full commitment to Hub Network's operation, due to factors such as the troubled launch of the Oprah Winfrey Network. Believing that they had overvalued its stake in the venture, Hasbro decided to cede the operation of the network to Discovery so it could focus more on content, and its core toy business.

Discovery and Hasbro both publicly announced the rebranding on September 25, 2014. Hasbro's CEO Brian Goldner explained that Discovery Family would be the "next chapter" in its joint venture with Discovery, "[combining] highly rated award-winning storytelling around Hasbro's brands and Discovery's most popular non-fiction shows that appeal to both children and families alike." Hub Network was re-launched as Discovery Family on October 13, 2014 — just over four years since the earlier re-launch as The Hub. With these changes, Discovery Communications now held a 60% stake in the joint venture; Hasbro retained a 40% stake and continued to program Discovery Family's daytime lineup with children's programming. Following the re-launch, the network's primetime lineup was replaced by reruns of family-oriented, factual programming from Discovery Channel's library. Henry Schleiff (who oversaw sister networks such as Destination America and Investigation Discovery) led the re-launched network, with Tom Cosgrove (who previously served as CEO of Discovery Channel and Science) as general manager.

In re-launching Hub Network, Discovery executives noted there would be a larger emphasis on programming of interest to both children and their parents; Warren argued that since ABC Family had become, in his opinion, aimed towards teenage girls, there was a gap in the broadcasting industry for a new, family-oriented network. With these shifts in the network's operation, it was announced on October 7, 2014 that the Transformers: Prime follow-up Transformers: Robots in Disguise, which was initially announced for Hub Network, would instead air on Cartoon Network (whose parent company would later merge with Discovery). Hasbro Studios president Stephen Davis felt that Cartoon Network was a more appropriate home for a Transformers series due to its male-oriented demographics, describing Hub Network's lineup as "traditionally skewed towards girls". Other recent Transformers animated series preceding The Hub's launch had aired on Cartoon Network. Davis remarked that Hasbro was still "100% committed" to its joint venture with Discovery. Despite the move for Robots in Disguise, fellow Hub Network Transformers series Transformers: Rescue Bots remained on Discovery Family for its third season.

==== Warner Bros. Discovery/Skydance Corporation era ====
On February 7, 2022, Hasbro CFO Deborah Thomas stated that the company was exploring strategic alternatives for its stake in the channel, citing the growing shift towards cord cutting and streaming services. She noted that the channel had been a "terrific investment" that had "driven over a $1 billion in revenue for the company", but that there had been "changes" in the cable industry since. These discussions came ahead of the then-upcoming merger of Discovery, Inc. with WarnerMedia to form Warner Bros. Discovery, a transaction which brought Discovery Family into the Entertainment Group division of Warner Bros. Discovery Networks.

Following the merger, Discovery Family was placed under the oversight of Cartoon Network's president Michael Ouweleen. Despite Hasbro's 2021 annual report reporting that its licensing agreement to produce and broadcast new television shows on the channel ended in 2021, the next annual report stated that its operating agreement with Discovery was renewed to run until March 31, 2025, though this was filed months before Hasbro spun off its non-children's entertainment assets and instituted layoffs. According to Warner Bros. Discovery's 2022 annual report, neither that company nor Hasbro took any action regarding the latter's 40% interest in Discovery Family within 2022, when the decision was originally due.

Despite continuous financial losses on the channel, Hasbro did not exercise the right by the election period expiration date of March 31, 2025, and the company's noncontrolling interest was "reclassified from redeemable noncontrolling interest to noncontrolling interest outside of stockholders' equity on the Company's consolidated balance sheets". By the end of the year, Hasbro had no remaining investment balance for DFC. In April 2026, Hasbro announced a partnership with Get After It Media to launch a digital television and free ad-supported streaming television (FAST) service dedicated to programming from its legacy franchises.

== Programming ==
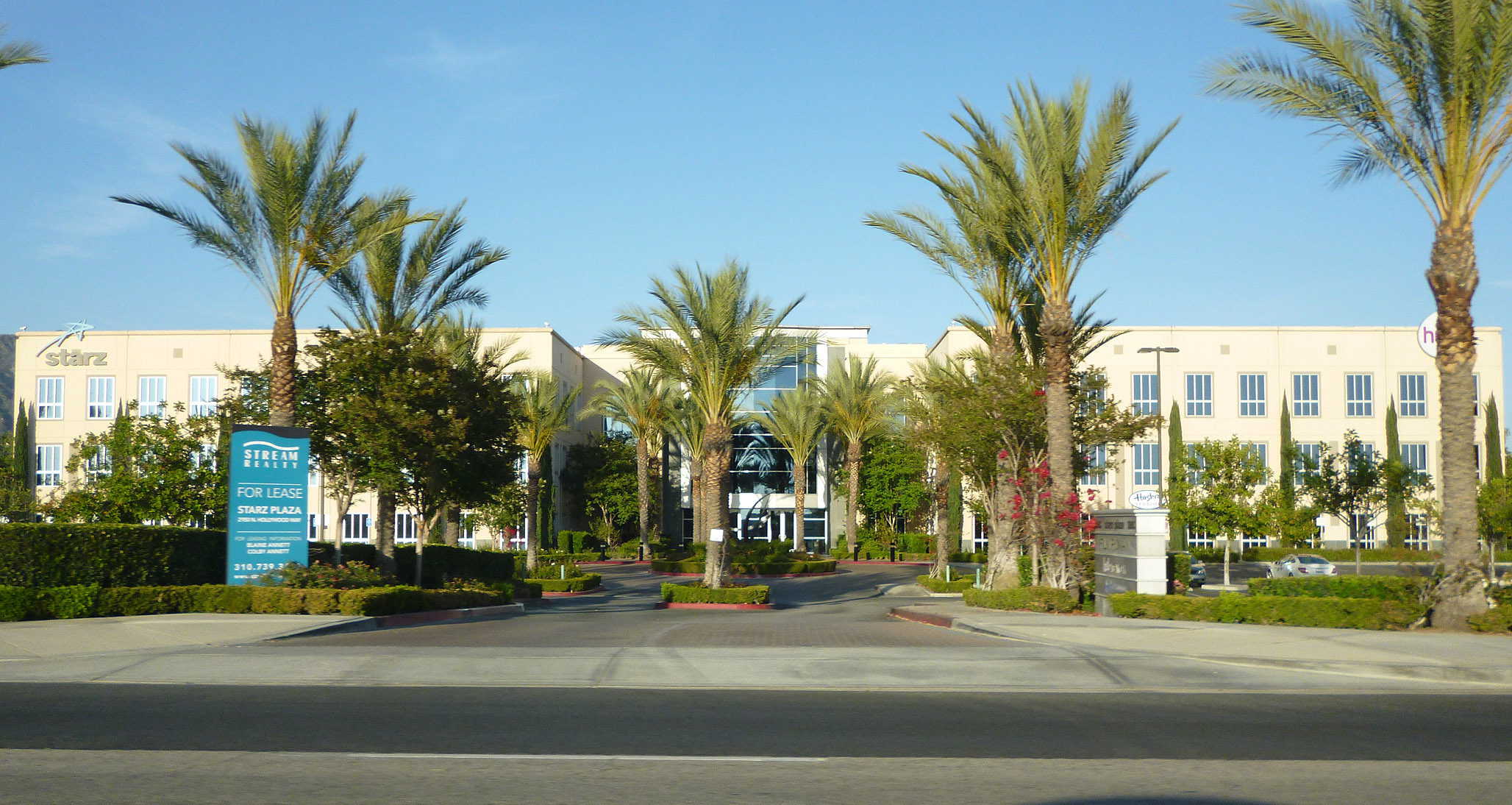
Hasbro Studios (headquarters in Burbank, California pictured) supplied much of the channel's programming during its existence.

The majority of Discovery Family's daytime programs are tied to media franchises owned by Hasbro itself, with newer series previously produced through its Hasbro Studios (later known as Allspark) and Entertainment One (which Hasbro acquired in 2019) subsidiaries. As the Hub Network, it previously aired game shows adapted from Hasbro's board games, such as Family Game Night, Scrabble Showdown, Pictureka!, and The Game of Life.

One of the network's most noteworthy series was My Little Pony: Friendship Is Magic, an animated series developed by Lauren Faust for the then-ongoing relaunch of Hasbro's My Little Pony franchise. The series not only became The Hub's highest-rated program within its target demographic of young girls, but attracted an unexpectedly significant cult following among male teenagers and adults. Following its conclusion in October 2019, a spin-off series, My Little Pony: Pony Life, ran from November 2020 to May 2021. A similar situation occurred with Littlest Pet Shop, which was succeeded by Littlest Pet Shop: A World of Our Own in 2018.

The Hatchery, a company co-founded by former president Margaret Loesch in 2003 with a majority stake acquired by American Greetings, supplied the series Dan Vs. and R. L. Stine's The Haunting Hour to the Hub Network. American Greetings also supplied Strawberry Shortcake's Berry Bitty Adventures (part of the 2009 re-launch of Strawberry Shortcake, a property they owned until 2015), The Twisted Whiskers Show, Maryoku Yummy, and Care Bears: Welcome to Care-a-Lot. Hasbro was named the master toy licensee of Care Bears and Strawberry Shortcake in 2008.

During its time as the Hub Network, the channel acquired series unrelated to Hasbro, The Hatchery, and American Greetings; these included Animal Mechanicals, The Aquabats! Super Show!, Cosmic Quantum Ray, Majors & Minors, Sabrina: Secrets of a Teenage Witch, Secret Millionaires Club, and SheZow. It also aired reruns of older acquired series like Fraggle Rock and Lois & Clark: The New Adventures of Superman; a collection of Warner Bros. Animation series, such as Batman Beyond, Batman: The Animated Series, Superman: The Animated Series, Animaniacs, and Tiny Toon Adventures; a few former Fox Kids shows like Goosebumps and Ninja Turtles: The Next Mutation; and syndicated sitcoms and dramas that, by the end of the network's run, included Blossom (which returned briefly in 2016), Step by Step, and Sister, Sister. A limited amount of Discovery Kids programming, such as Adventure Camp and Flight 29 Down, remained on The Hub's lineup upon its launch.

In 2019, Discovery Family acquired the cable rights to several series and specials from 41 Entertainment, including Pac-Man and the Ghostly Adventures and Super Monsters. Since the formation of Warner Bros. Discovery, the channel regained the cable rights to the Warner Bros. Animation library and also began airing several Cartoon Network series, such as Baby Looney Tunes, Summer Camp Island, Steven Universe, and classic Looney Tunes/Merrie Melodies shorts.

=== Primetime and overnight programming ===
Following the re-launch as Discovery Family in October 2014, the channel began carrying science and nature-related programs from Discovery Channel during primetime, such as Africa, Extreme Engineering: Big Reveals, Flying Wild Alaska, and Time Warp. Original programs have also been commissioned for this time slot, including Bake It Like Buddy, From Wags to Riches with Bill Berloni, My Dog's Crazy Animal Friends, Reno, Set, Go!, Secrets of America's Favorite Places, and the ninth season of Cake Boss.

== Availability ==
Discovery Family (France)
- Final logo used from 2017 to 2022
- Broadcast area: France; Monaco

Programming
- Language: French
- Picture format: 16:9 1080i (HDTV)

Ownership
- Owner: Discovery Networks EMEA
- Sister channels: Discovery Channel; Discovery Science; Discovery Investigation

History
- Launched: 14 September 2017; 9 years ago
- Closed: 29 March 2022; 4 years ago

Links
- Website: discoveryfrance.fr/discoveryfamily

Discovery Family operates one feed nationally, and does not operate a timeshift feed for the west coast. A 1080i high-definition simulcast of the network was introduced in May 2010, when the channel was still known as Discovery Kids, with AT&T U-verse as the first to carry the HD feed. Whether or not the HD feed prior to the rebrand as The Hub aired any native widescreen programming, or simply presented the SD feed in native pillarboxing or stretched on the high definition feed to fill the 16:9 aspect ratio instead, is unclear.

Based on numbers from Nielsen, Variety ranked Discovery Family as the 132nd most-watched broadcast or cable network in the United States in 2022 based on total viewership.

=== International versions ===
On March 31, 2016, the pan-EMEA version of Discovery World was re-launched as a regional version of Discovery Family.

On September 14, 2017 at 5:30pm, a French version of Discovery Family was launched exclusively for SFR TV subscribers, as a part of a deal between Altice (the parent company of SFR) and Discovery, Inc. Unlike its American counterpart, the channel did not include children's programming in its schedule. The channel shut down on 29 March 2022.

== See also ==
- K2 (TV channel): Italian equivalent with a similar scheduling strategy.
- Frisbee (TV channel): Italian sister network to K2.
