= The Hatchery (company) =

American media production company

The Hatchery LLC
- Company type: Private
- Industry: Production
- Founded: 2003; 23 years ago
- Founder: Margaret Loesch; Bruce Stein
- Headquarters: Burbank, California
- Key people: Dan Angel (CCO)
- Parent: Mandalay Entertainment; American Greetings
- Website: http://thehatcheryllc.com/

The Hatchery LLC is an American media production company, which was owned by American Greetings and Mandalay Entertainment and located in Burbank, California.

Margaret Loesch and Bruce Stein formed Hatchery in 2003 with financing from Peter Guber and Paul Schaeffer of Mandalay Entertainment Group. American Greetings Corporation purchased a major stake in the company in December 2004, joining Mandalay in joint ownership.

American Greetings thereafter licensed their Care Bears and Strawberry Shortcake characters in various filmed projects with Hatchery, marketing their products via their approximately 600 stores and 35,000 greeting card retail locations. The Hatchery has produced two programs that aired on cable channel The Hub: R. L. Stine's The Haunting Hour and Dan Vs..

== Shows produced ==
- Balderdash (2004–2005)
- Young Blades (2005)
- The Zula Patrol (2005–2008)
- Care Bears: Adventures in Care-a-Lot (Oopsy Does It!, DVD specials only, 2007-08)
- R. L. Stine's The Haunting Hour (2010–2014)
- Dan Vs. (2011–2013)

== Films produced ==
- R. L. Stine's The Haunting Hour: Don’t Think About It (2007)
- Gifted Hands: The Ben Carson Story (2009)
