= Sands of Oblivion =

- Genre: Action; Adventure; Fantasy
- Written by: Jeff Coatney; Kevin VanHook
- Directed by: David Flores
- Starring: Morena Baccarin; Adam Baldwin; Victor Webster; George Kennedy; Richard Kind; Dan Castellaneta
- Music by: Ludek Drizhal
- Country of origin: United States
- Original language: English

Production
- Producers: Karen Bailey; Kevin VanHook
- Cinematography: Keith J. Duggan
- Running time: 90 minutes
- Production company: Starz Productions

Original release
- Network: Sci Fi Channel
- Release: July 28, 2007

Sands of Oblivion is a 2007 Sci-Fi Channel original movie starring Morena Baccarin, Adam Baldwin, Victor Webster, George Kennedy, Richard Kind and Dan Castellaneta. It was directed by David Flores and premiered July 28, 2007 on the Sci Fi Channel.

== Synopsis ==
The film tells the story of a prop from Cecil B. DeMille's 1923 film The Ten Commandments that was actually an authentic artifact from antiquity with cursed powers. In the modern day it resurfaces, leading to murder and mayhem.

== Cast ==
- Morena Baccarin as Alice Carter
- Adam Baldwin as Jesse Carter
- Victor Webster as Mark Tevis
- George Kennedy as John Tevis
- Azie Tesfai as Jamie
- Richard Kind as Ira Finkelstein
- John Aniston as Nigel Barrington
- Dan Castellaneta as Cecil B. DeMille
- Raymond O'Connor as Dale

== Legacy ==
Sands of Oblivion was featured in the 2016 documentary, The Lost City of Cecil B. DeMille, about the actual efforts to excavate the set of The Ten Commandments.
