= Slayer (film) =

- Written by: Kevin VanHook
- Directed by: Kevin VanHook
- Starring: Casper Van Dien; Jennifer O'Dell; Tony Plana; Kevin Grevioux; Danny Trejo; Lynda Carter
- Theme music composer: Ludek Drizhal
- Country of origin: United States
- Original language: English

Production
- Producers: Karen Bailey; Morris Berger; Stephen Brown; John W. Hyde
- Editor: Kevin VanHook
- Running time: 88 minutes
- Budget: $2 million (estimated)

Original release
- Network: Sci Fi Channel
- Release: July 8, 2006

Slayer is a 2006 vampire themed television film written and directed by Kevin VanHook and starring Casper Van Dien and Kevin Grevioux. The film's plot involves an elite commando squad dealing with a deadly and bloodthirsty vampire clan living in the South American rain forest. It was produced for the Sci Fi Channel.

== Plot ==
There's something strange going on in the rain forest down in South America. There have always been legends about vampires living in the jungle and feeding off animals, but now they are suddenly attacking humans and quite viciously, too. Not only are they hunting together in packs "like roving dogs," but they don't seem to be bothered by sunlight, and knives and bullets don't kill them. Of course, the military doesn't buy that they are vampires, just "tribal anomalies who BELIEVE that drinking human blood will give them power," but Colonel Jessica Weaver (Lynda Carter) is sending Captain Tom "Hawk" Hawkins (Casper Van Dien), Sergeant Alex Juarez (Alexis Cruz), and the rest of his platoon back down there to finish the job they started some six months ago when they first encountered these tribal anomalies. She's already sent Hawk's second-in-command and best friend, Grieves (Kevin Grevioux), a huge, hulking man, on ahead so that he can get a feeling for what is happening. The mission is made all the more imperative since Jessica has just found out that Laurie Williams (Jennifer O'Dell), a University entomologist, Jessica's goddaughter, and Hawk's ex-wife, is on a field expedition down there. Hawk and his men are to leave immediately for Agua Caliente, a small town along a river in a no-fly zone, where they are to rendezvous with Grieves and look for Laurie.

Meanwhile, in South America, Laurie, along with her guide, Luiz, and a couple of aides, are making their way through the forest when they come across a young boy threatening a man with a wooden stake. Laurie, quick-thinker that she is, plays dumb blonde and approaches the boy, speaking to him in bad Spanish... "Porque usted threatenez el hombre?" With the kid distracted by her act, Laurie quickly grabs the stake and backhands the boy to the ground. El hombre, whose name is Javier Vasquez (Tony Plana), explains that the boy is from a local village. His grandmother was recently killed, and the boy believes vampires did it. Apparently, he simply lost it and attacked Javier as he was walking through the forest alone. Turns out that Javier owns a hotel in Agua Caliente, and he does not have many guests, so he invites Laurie to stay there. Dreaming of a nice hot bath, Laurie happily accepts.

Grieves and his small band of soldiers aren't faring quite as well. While stopped at a bar in a small village, they are attacked by vampires, who overpower them. When Grieves comes to, he is surrounded. The vampires take him and his men to their nest in a nearby cave. Guillermo (Ski Carr), the leader, explains that Grieves has already been bitten and will soon turn into a vampire himself. Guillermo wants Grieves to join his group of vampires and teach them guerrilla tactics. He releases Grieves, who tries to fight himself free, but it isn't long until Grieves turns into a vampire. His first blood meal is from one of his own men.

Hawk and his platoon are making their way towards Agua Caliente when they notice the trailmarkers (blue ribbons) left by Laurie. They figure that they are about three days behind and decide to camp for the night. During the night, Hawk wakes up to see a vampiress, Estrella (Joyce Giraud) squatting outside his tent. He shoots her, but a half-dozen other vampires jump them, and the fighting begins. Several vampires get staked, but Hawk loses three men, too. They decide that they might be able to make better time and cut the risk of vampire attacks by renting a fishing boat and heading to Agua Caliente on water.

The next day finds them doing just that. The boat makes stops at trading posts along the way. At one of them, Hawk runs into an old lady selling a "vampire souvenir" that turns out to be a dogtag from one of Grieves' men. As they continue making their way up the river, they pass another village that the vampires ambushed. The villagers are disposing of their bloody dead by floating them away in the river. In another spot, they stop to talk with a man who is dragging a body down to the river. He tells them that the vampires are getting smarter, and they're now using guns. A short while later, the boat hits something in the water; they notice a body caught in the nets, so they haul it in. The body suddenly springs to life and they find themselves being attacked by a vampire. But it isn't just any vampire. It's Reyes (Eddie J. Fernández), one of the soldiers in Grieves' squad. At a sugar plantation, they learn that an organized group of vampires, some of them soldiers led by a "Negro grande" attacked and killed most of the plantation workers. It's becoming painfully obvious to Hawk what's happening.

Laurie and her group have made it to the Hotel Agua Caliente. Before taking her bath, Laurie has tea with Javier, who warns her that she must be careful if she goes into the forest around Agua Caliente. There ARE vampires here, Javier warns, even though Laurie doesn't believe in them. Javier explains the legend that says the first vampires drank from a fountain of youth, the same fountain from which Ponce de Leon was searching. The waters gave them immortality, but the cost was that they were forced to drink human blood. Later, as Laurie prepares for bed, she gets a call on her cellphone from Hawk, who has been trying to reach her for days. He explains that he's on his way to Agua Caliente, will be there tomorrow, and says that Laurie is NOT to go into the jungle until he gets there. Still unconvinced about vampires, Laurie goes to bed, only to be awakened to find Estrella, fangs bared and blood on her face, staring down at her. The two of them tussle until Javier comes into the room and orders Estrella out. Javier then takes Laurie to the vampire cave.

That night, the vampires led by Grieves attack Hawk and his men. Hawk manages to fight them off but is badly wounded by Grieves. Alex thinks he might be able to follow the vampires to their nest, so Hawk gives permission. The next thing Hawk knows, he is waking up in a bed in a hotel room with Colonel Weaver standing by. She informs Hawk that he has been out of it for over 24 hours and, in that time, she learned that Laurie is missing and flew down immediately. Thanks to Alex's tracking, they now know where the vampires are holed up, so Hawk leads his men on an ambush.

Unfortunately, they find themselves being ambushed by the vampires. An all-out melee ensues, during which Hawk manages to slit Grieves' throat, but not enough to destroy him. Estrella, who has a thing for the upperdog, tosses a long wooden stake to Hawk. Hawk is about to plunge it through Grieves' chest but stops. "We'll take him back with us," Hawk says. "We'll find a cure for this."

"Only one of us is walking out of here alive," says Grieves and leaps toward Hawk's back.

Without turning around, Hawk thrusts the stake between his legs and behind him so that it sails right through Grieves' heart. "I know," says Hawk, as Grieves dies.

But it's not over yet. Enter Javier Vasquez, who introduces himself as a conquistador from the court of Queen Isabella I of Spain, who sent him to the new world to convert the natives... except it was the natives who converted him and his daughter Estrella. Then Javier brings out Laurie, who explains to Hawk why the vampires have recently changed their hunting tactics, thanks to man's infringement on the rain forests. As more and more of the forests are cut down and the animal population wiped out, vampires have had to turn to humans for their food. Now they're tired of living in caves and want to re-enter the world of men, but on their own terms.

Javier invites Hawk to join him and to take Grieves' place, but Hawk refuses, so Javier changes into a giant bat. As Hawk and Javier (as a giant bat) fight each other, Estrella and Laurie duke it out. Laurie throws a stake through Estrella's chest. Hawk shoots at a huge stalagtite that falls from the cave ceiling and impales Javier, pinning him to the cave floor. Hawk then cuts off Javier's head. Hawk and Laurie kiss. Enter Colonel Weaver and Alex. Jessica explains that they were waiting outside all the time but that Hawk wanted to save Laurie himself. Laurie melts. One remaining vampire leaps at Colonel Weaver, but she shoots him through the heart with a dartgun. Laurie and Hawk leave the cave in each other's arms.

== Cast ==
- Casper Van Dien as Captain Tom "Hawk" Hawkins
- Kevin Grevioux as Grieves
- Ray Park as Acrobatic Twins
- Danny Trejo as Montegna
- Tony Plana as Javier Vasquez
- Pablo Espinosa as Jimmy
- Alexis Cruz as Sergeant Alex Juarez
- Jennifer O'Dell as Dr. Laurie Williams
- Merritt Bailey as Merritt
- Ski Carr as Guillermo
- Lynda Carter as Colonel Jessica Weaver
- Joyce Giraud as Estrella

== Development ==
Slayer was filmed in Puerto Rico on a $2,000,000 budget. The company Tata Elxsi Visual Computing Lab handled the post production. The film premiered on the Sci-Fi channel on 8 July 2006.

== Release ==
Slayer was released on region 1 DVD in the United States on November 21, 2006, distributed by Anchor Bay Entertainment. The DVD included subtitles and Dolby Digital 5.1, as well as special features including a commentary by Van Dien and the director, and a photo and concept art gallery.

== Reception ==
The film received negative reviews from critics. Dread Central awarded the film two out of a possible five mugs of blood and said "Slayer is pretty much what you'd expect; a bit dull, full of hammy acting, logic gaps you could drive a truck through, and ridiculously sparse on the special effects." The website Absolute Horror awarded the film two out of four stars.

== Background ==
Casper Van Dien and Kevin Grevioux earlier appeared in separate vampires films: Dracula 3000 and the Underworld series respectively. Van Dien portrayed Van Helsing in his movie, while Grevioux played the Lycan Raze in the first Underworld film. Kevin VanHook also worked in DC Comics' vampire-themed comics, Superman and Batman vs Vampires and Werewolves.

== See also ==
- Vampire film
