= Voodoo Moon =

2006 American film

- Voodoo Moon box cover
- Written by: Kevin VanHook
- Directed by: Kevin VanHook
- Starring: Eric Mabius, Charisma Carpenter, Rik Young, Jeffrey Combs
- Theme music composer: Ludek Drizhal
- Country of origin: United States
- Original language: English

Production
- Producer: Karen Bailey
- Cinematography: Matt Steinauer
- Editor: Kevin VanHook
- Running time: 86 minutes

Original release
- Network: Sci Fi Channel
- Release: June 4, 2006

Voodoo Moon is a 2006 horror film written and directed by comic book artist and writer Kevin VanHook. It aired as a Sunday night movie on the Sci-Fi channel on June 4, 2006.

== Plot synopsis ==
A demonic being destroys an entire town, save a young boy and his sister. Twenty years later, the sister is an artist with psychic abilities and her brother has grown obsessed with tracking down the demon who took out his town. Together, they fight to destroy the evil being that could kill them both.

== Cast ==
- Eric Mabius as Cole
- Charisma Carpenter as Heather
- Rik Young as Daniel
- Jeffrey Combs as Frank Taggert
- Jayne Heitmeyer as Lola
- Dee Wallace as Mary-Ann
- John Amos as "Dutch"
- Reynaldo Gallegos as Ray (as Rey Gallegos)
- Kimberly Hawthorne as Diana (as Kim Hawthorne)
- David Jean Thomas as Jean-Pierre
- Kelley Hazen as Helen Taggert
- Geoffrey Lewis as Old Man #1
- Vernon Duckett as Old Man #2
- Frank Collison as Mac
- Alison Lees-Taylor as Sally
- Jason Rodriguez as Bobby
- Cathrine Grace as Art Gallery Patron
- Merritt Bailey as Lola's Husband
- James DiStefano as Cab Driver
- Cameron VanHook as Skinned Old Man
- Georgia Anderson as Crucified Brunette Girl
- Anissa Briggs as Girl At Cemetery
- Mary Ann Farkas as Old Lady with Fork
- Cathy Fitzpatrick as Art Gallery Patron
- Michael Lloyd Gilliland as Biker Leader (as Michael Gilliland)
- Vester Grayson as Rocking Chair Demon
- Lauren M. Higgs as Young Woman At Motel
- Keegan Holst as Boy With Scissors
- Paul Latham as Zombie
- Alexis Longo as Scared Girl
- Justin Ordman as Tom
- Brian O'Sullivan as Thief
- Blair Redford as Evil Young Man
- Kevin VanHook as Cemetery Gardener
- Scott Whyte as Billy
- David Keith Anderson as Demon (uncredited)
