= Margaret Loesch =

American television producer and executive

- Born: Margaret Ann Loesch; March 28, 1946 (age 80); San Antonio, Texas
- Education: University of Southern Mississippi; Louisiana State University in New Orleans
- Occupation: Entertainment executive

Margaret Ann Loesch (/lɛʃ/ LESH; born March 28, 1946) is an American television executive and producer. She is the former president and CEO of Discovery Communications and Hasbro, Inc's joint venture television network Hub Network. She stepped down from her position in 2014.

== Early life ==
Margaret Ann Loesch was born to Margaret M. Loesch and Brig. Gen. L. Fred Loesch (USAF). She attended undergraduate school at the University of Southern Mississippi, studying political science, and graduate school at Louisiana State University in New Orleans.

== Career ==
In 1971, Loesch started her entertainment career with television programming and production positions at ABC, then in 1979 with NBC. In 1979 she moved to Hanna-Barbera Productions as vice president for children's programming, moving up to executive vice president. In 1984, she joined Marvel Productions as president and chief executive officer and remained in this position up until 1990. Loesch then ran Fox Kids from 1990 until 1997. During this time she bought X-Men: The Animated Series and the Power Rangers franchise (both would prove to be wildly popular) for the network.

For most of 1998, Loesch was President of the Jim Henson Television Group, where she was involved in the Odyssey Channel agreement with Hallmark Entertainment and National Interfaith Cable Coalition. She moved to Odyssey in November 1998 as president and chief executive officer. With Hallmark taking over a majority ownership in Odyssey, Loesch led a re-branding of Odyssey to the Hallmark Channel in 1999. In 2003, Loesch and Bruce Stein formed The Hatchery, a family entertainment and consumer product company. She was hired as Hub Network chief executive officer position in July 2009 until the end of 2014. In March 2015, Loesch was named to Genius Brands' international board of directors to replace Jeff Weiss, the president and chief operations officer of American Greetings.

== Filmography ==
| Years | Title | Notes |
|---|---|---|
| 1981 | Superfriends | Executive In Charge of Production |
| 1981 | Trollkins | Executive In Charge of Production |
| 1981–1983 | The Smurfs | Executive In Charge of Production/Supervising Executive |
| 1982–1983 | Pac-Man | Executive In Charge of Production |
| 1983–1984 | Pac-Man | Supervising Executive |
| 1983–1984 | The New Scooby and Scrappy-Doo Show | Supervising Executive |
| 1983–1984 | The Biskitts | Supervising Executive |
| 1983–1984 | Super Friends: The Legendary Super Powers Show | Supervising Executive Producer |
| 1984–1985 | Challenge of the GoBots | Executive In Charge of Production |
| 1985–1986 | Paw Paws | Executive In Charge of Production |
| 1985–1986 | The Super Powers Team: Galactic Guardians | Executive In Charge of Production |
| 1985 | The 13 Ghosts of Scooby-Doo | Executive In Charge of Production |
| 1988 | Dino-Riders | Executive Producer |
| 1990–1995 | Tiny Toon Adventures | Executive In Charge of Production |
| 1991–1995 | Taz-Mania | Executive Producer |
| 1992–1995 | Batman: The Animated Series | Executive Producer |
| 1992 | The Plucky Duck Show | Executive In Charge of Production |
| 1993–1998 | Animaniacs | Executive In Charge of Production |
| 1995–1999 | The Sylvester & Tweety Mysteries | Executive Producer |
| 1995–1997 | Freakazoid! | Executive In Charge of Production |
| 1995–1998 | Pinky and the Brain | Executive In Charge of Production |
| 1996–2000 | Superman: The Animated Series | Executive Producer |
| 1996–1997 | Road Rovers | Executive In Charge of Production |
| 1996–1997 | Waynehead | Executive In Charge of Production |
| 1997–1999 | The New Batman Adventures | Executive Producer |
| 1998–2000 | Histeria! | Executive In Charge of Production |
| 1998–1999 | Pinky, Elmyra & the Brain | Executive In Charge of Production |
| 1999–2001 | Batman Beyond | Executive Producer |
| 1999–2000 | Detention | Executive Producer |
| 2000–2002 | Static Shock | Executive Producer |
| 2001–2002 | The Zeta Project | Executive Producer |
| 2001–2002 | Justice League | Executive Producer |
