= Samuel Schellinger =

American windmill builder (1765–1848)

Samuel Schellinger (April 10, 1765 – January 18, 1848), was a millwright of Amagansett, New York and the craftsman who built the Pantigo (Mulford Farm) windmill (1804), the Hayground Windmill (1809), the Amagansett windmill (1814) and the Beebe Windmill (1820) which are on the NRHP. Later, he built the Setauket windmill. Records show he built or worked on seven windmills and repaired others.

== History ==
Samuel Schellinger came from a long line of woodworking craftsmen in East Hampton. For generations, his ancestors had created pieces of furniture and worked on various woodworking projects.

Schellinger's father Jonathan IV (1733-1814), was a carpenter and furniture-maker. Further back in the family tree, William Schellinx (spelled with a Dutch touch), an early relative of Samuel's constructed and furnished the East Hampton town prison back in 1698. His father was Jacob Schellinx I, whom arrived Neiu Amsterdam in 1663 and conducted business as an agent for his uncle, a merchant of Amsterdam. The Schellingers were one of the first families in Amagansett. Samuel had 6 siblings born to Elizabeth Schellinger (born Stratton): Elizabeth Schellenger, Alben Derby Schellenger, Jacob Schellinger; Phebe Schellinger; Jonathan Schellinger; Hannah Conklin; and 1 other Half brother, Sylvester Schellinger, born of Hannah Schellinger, his step-mother.

Schellinger married Alba (Betsey Darby) in 1795, at age 29. Alba was born in 1774, in Amagansett, New York. They had 5 children: Elisheba Schellinger, Mercy Baker (born Schellinger), Hannah Waters Cartwright, Mary Ann Miller and Alben Derby Schellenger.

Schellinger established a business in East Hampton, seeking large construction projects, such as windmills, houses, and barns. He travelled widely for large projects like windmills both on the North and South Forks of Long Island and also Nantucket, Block Island and Brooklyn, NY. A boatwright, he also worked at Sag Harbor in the early days of whaling. In addition to his involvement in large construction projects, Schellinger also dedicated a portion of his time to the creation of furniture, small wooden objects, and tools. A sizable business, he had a crew of assistant carpenters and was well regarded. The Amagansett schoolhouse was built by Samuel Schellinger in 1802, making it one of the oldest schoolhouses on eastern Long Island.

== Golden age of Smock mills ==
Beginning in 1795, new windmills were built with their gears enclosed inside six or eight-sided tapering wood-shingled walls in the shape of farmer's petticoats, or “smocks.” They became known as Smock Windmills. As the American Revolution came to a close, people started embracing the idea of adopting innovative technologies, especially those from Europe. Windmills, with their intricate mechanics including sails, shafts, gears, and two rotating stone platters, gained popularity. They were ingeniously employed for grinding purposes, utilizing levers to manipulate the stones and crush corn or grain in between.

It's of note that despite their distinctive "smocks," windmills in eastern Long Island were never classified as buildings. Instead, they were regarded as farm equipment that could be bought, sold, and relocated. It's not uncommon for windmills to have history of being situated in four or five different locations before settling in their current spots. Interestingly, the timbers at the base of these windmills rest on large boulders rather than traditional foundations, allowing for easy mobility and repositioning.

A local clock maker named Nathanial Dominy IV made an intriguing discovery regarding the windmill. He found that the windmill cap could be rotated to align the blades with the direction of the wind as it changed its course. Instead of relying solely on a long "tail pole" with a wheel at the end that had to be manually pushed along the ground to move the cap, a set of new gears inside the windmill allowed for a more efficient operation.

The technology of cast-iron gears was already in use in English smock mills and Schellinger bought the gears he used on Beebe's mill in New York City. According to his apprentice, William Baker, Schellinger built windmills at Brooklyn and Block Island, also in New York; and Nantucket, Massachusetts. He also did considerable work on boats at Sag Harbor.

== Pantigo ==
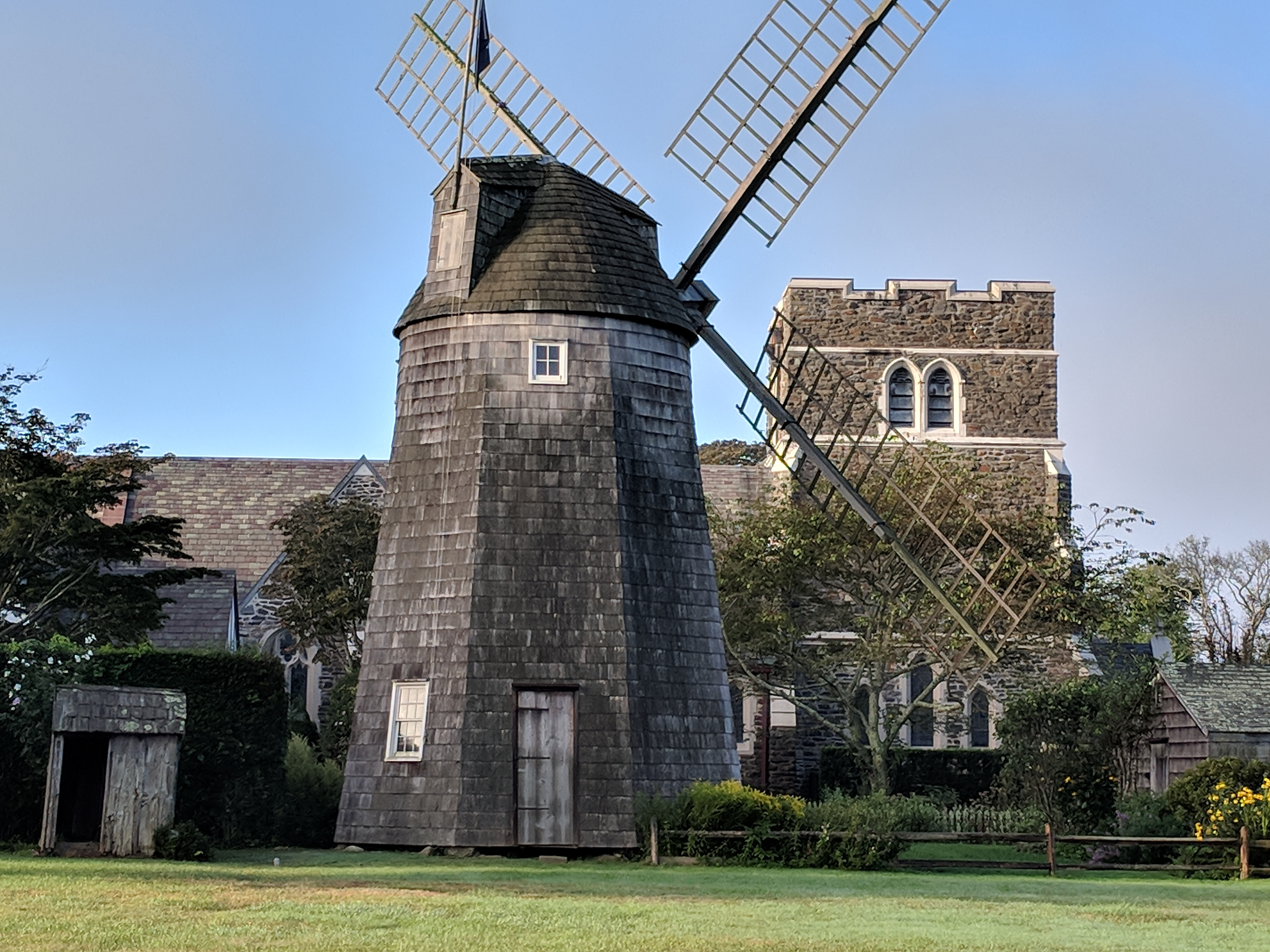
Pantigo Windmill (1804) and St.Lukes Church 20180916

The Pantigo Mill was built by Schellinger for Huntting Miller in 1804 at the end of Mill Hill Lane. His assistants were David Sherril, James, Richard and Mathew Raynor. Months later, Nathaniel Dominy started work on the nearby Gardiner Mill, for an ownership group of seven or eight people, just across the green (the Gardiner Mill has never moved from its original location). Additionally, providing support later at the mill was Sherril, a skilled carpenter from East Hampton. His account book reveals that he restored numerous windmills in the area. He did maintenance on Pantigo in 1805, 1807, 1814 & 1815.

The mill was built in 1804 on Hunting Miller's farm in East Hampton. Moved in 1850 to Egypt's Lane, it was moved once again in 1917 to Mulford Farm across from Town Pond in East Hampton.

The Pantigo Mill was eventually moved to where the Verizon Building sits, and then again. It was disabled by a storm in 1879 and bought by the Buek family, who moved it to its final location, behind Home, Sweet Home, AKA the Mulford Farm.

== Amagansett ==
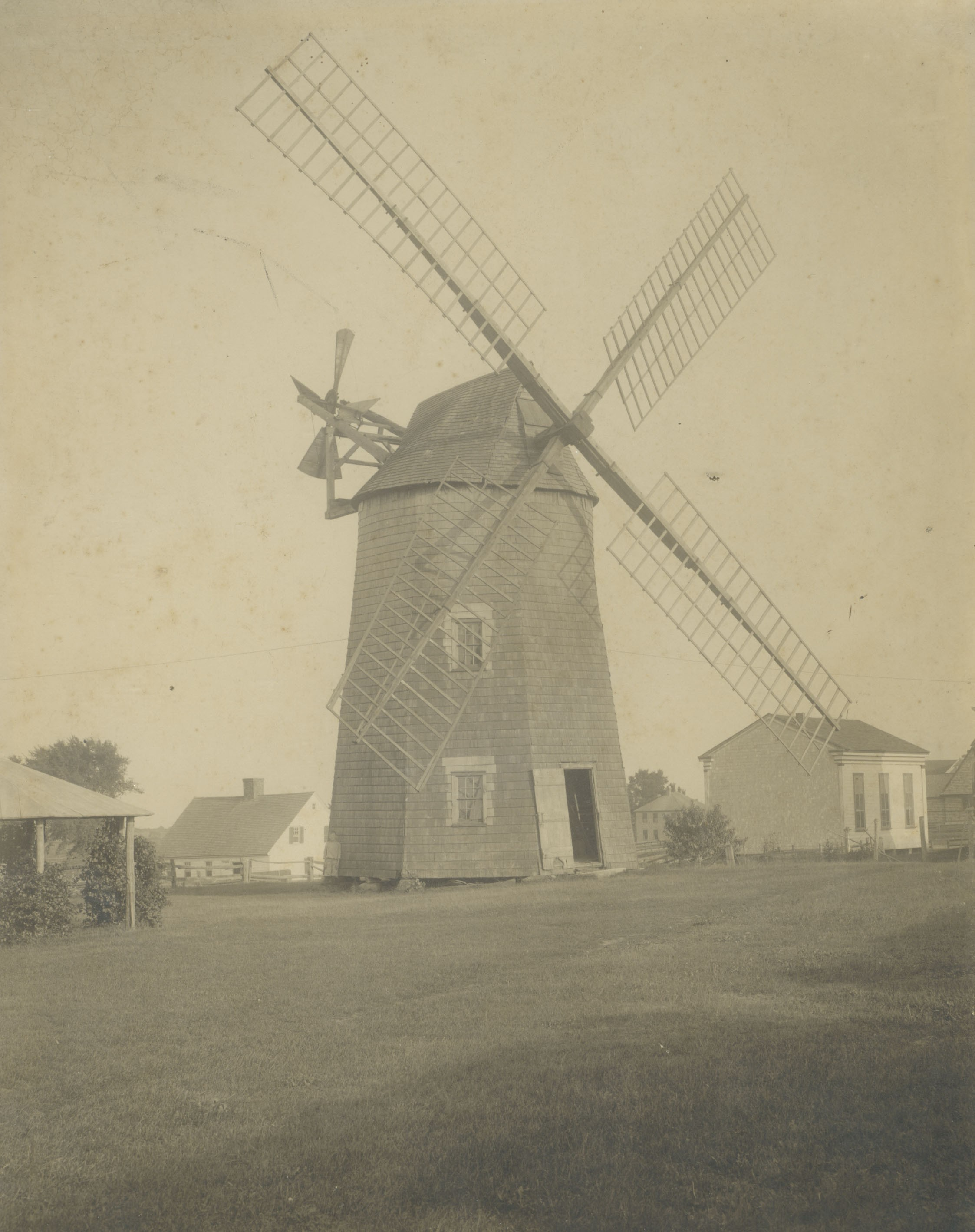
Amagansett Windmill

The 1814 construction details of the windmill at Amagansett by Schellinger is unclear as to whether it had a tailpole to turn the cap. Later photographs show a fantail in place. A gasoline engine used to pump water set the mill ablaze and it burnt down in 1924.

== Beebe ==
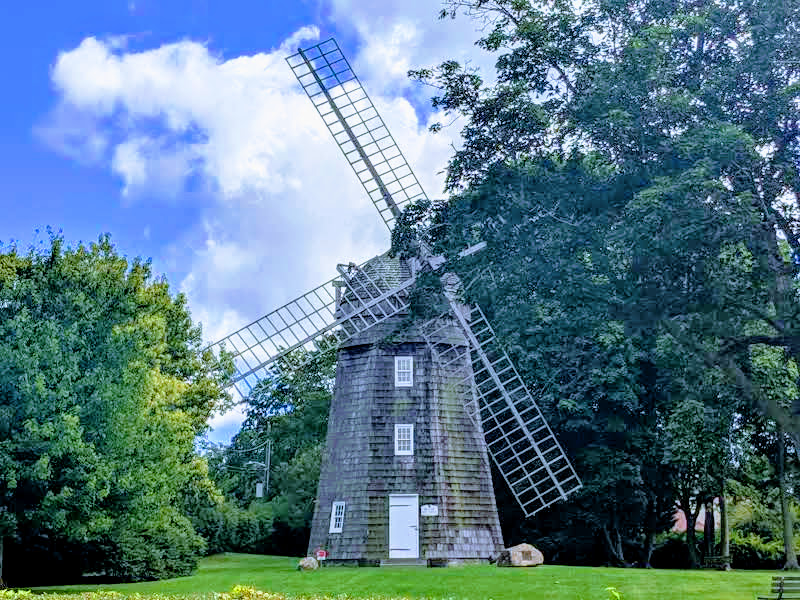
Beebe_windmill_20190913

Schellinger played a role in bringing innovations from England to eastern Long Island. In 1820, he constructed a groundbreaking windmill for Captain Lester Beebe in Sag Harbor. This windmill, the first of its kind, incorporated several revolutionary features.

Most notable was the addition of a fantail, a mechanism that automatically adjusted the position of the mill's sails to face the wind. This ingenious design ensured optimal wind capture, maximizing the mill's efficiency and productivity. Additionally, Schellinger implemented centrifugal governors, which helped regulate the speed of the millstones. These governors maintained a consistent grinding speed, resulting in finer and more consistent flour production.

Another feature of the Beebe Windmill was the use of cast-iron bevel gearing. This type of gearing, known for its durability and precision, significantly improved the mill's overall performance. By incorporating this advanced technology, Schellinger elevated the efficiency and reliability of the windmill.

Schellinger embarked on the construction of Captain Lester Beebe's windmill on September 5, 1820, and diligently worked for 119 days until its completion in January. Throughout this project, Schellinger was supported by two apprentices, namely William Baker and Carl, who assisted him in various aspects of the construction process.

Additionally, another skilled carpenter, Pardon T. Tabor (1779-1842), played a significant role in the building of the windmill. Tabor's involvement is evident as he charged Lester Beebe for 89 days of "work on Mill," beginning on the same day as Schellinger, September 5, 1820. Tabor's expertise extended beyond windmill construction, as he was known for his craftsmanship in furniture-making, shipbuilding, and overseeing large-scale construction projects in Sag Harbor.

Although the construction of wind-powered gristmills declined in the region after 1820, the innovations introduced in the Beebe Windmill had a lasting impact. The concepts pioneered by Schellinger were later adapted and applied to many existing mills in the area, enhancing their functionality and bringing them up to par with the latest advancements.

== Haye ground ==
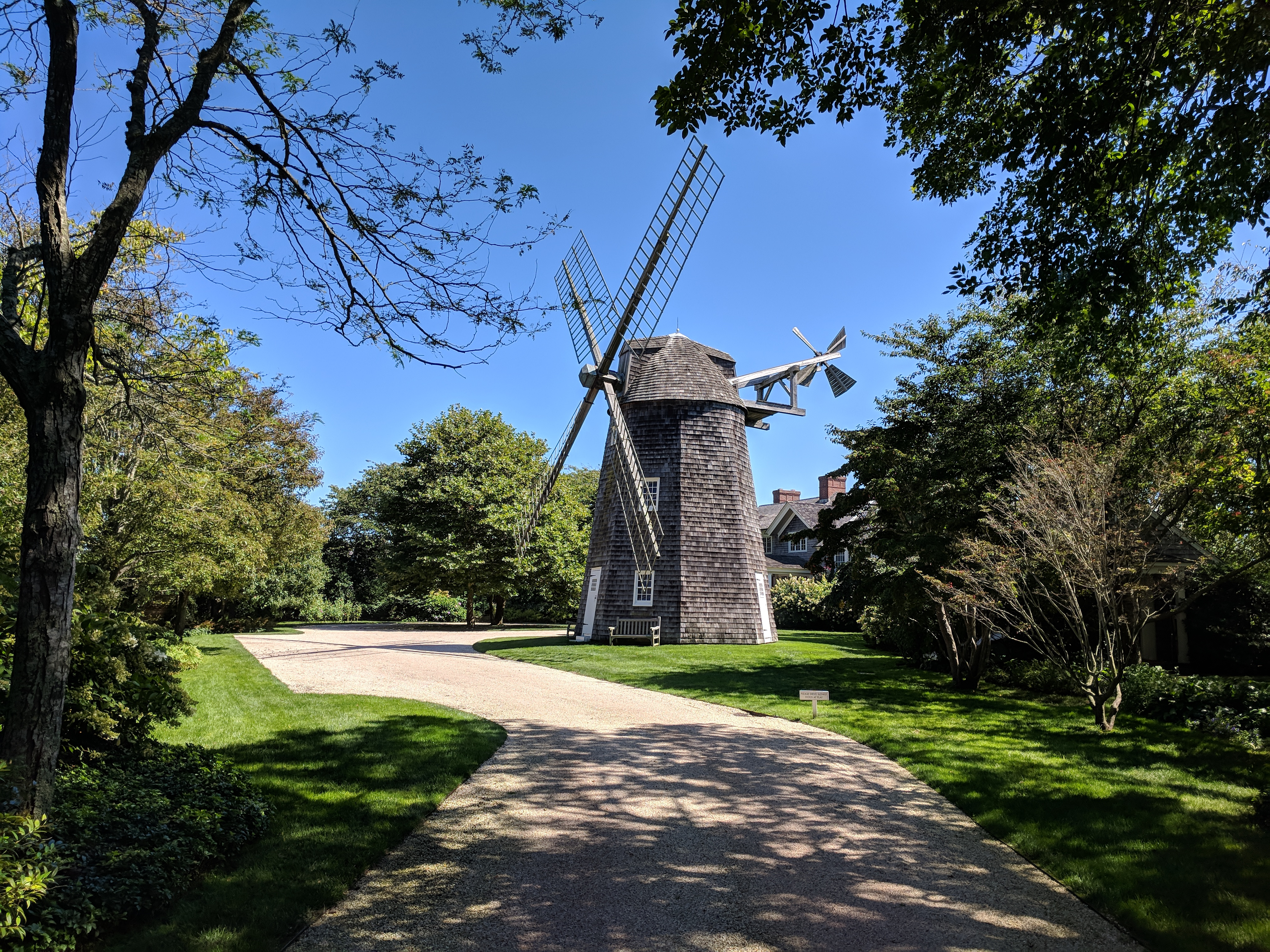
Hayground_Windmill_20180916

Nathan Topping Cook, based in Bridgehampton, was a skilled carpenter, wheelwright, and furniture maker. He also contributed to local mills with his expertise. While he was a part owner of the windmill at Haye Ground, near Bridgehampton, Samuel Schellinger is credited with building the mill.

The original construction of 1809 used a tailpole to turn the sails. It was later retro fitted with a fantail after 1820. The details of the gearing are identical to the Beebe windmill, a Schellinger innovation.

== See also ==
Dominy craftsmen
