= Pantigo Windmill =

Historic house in New York, United States

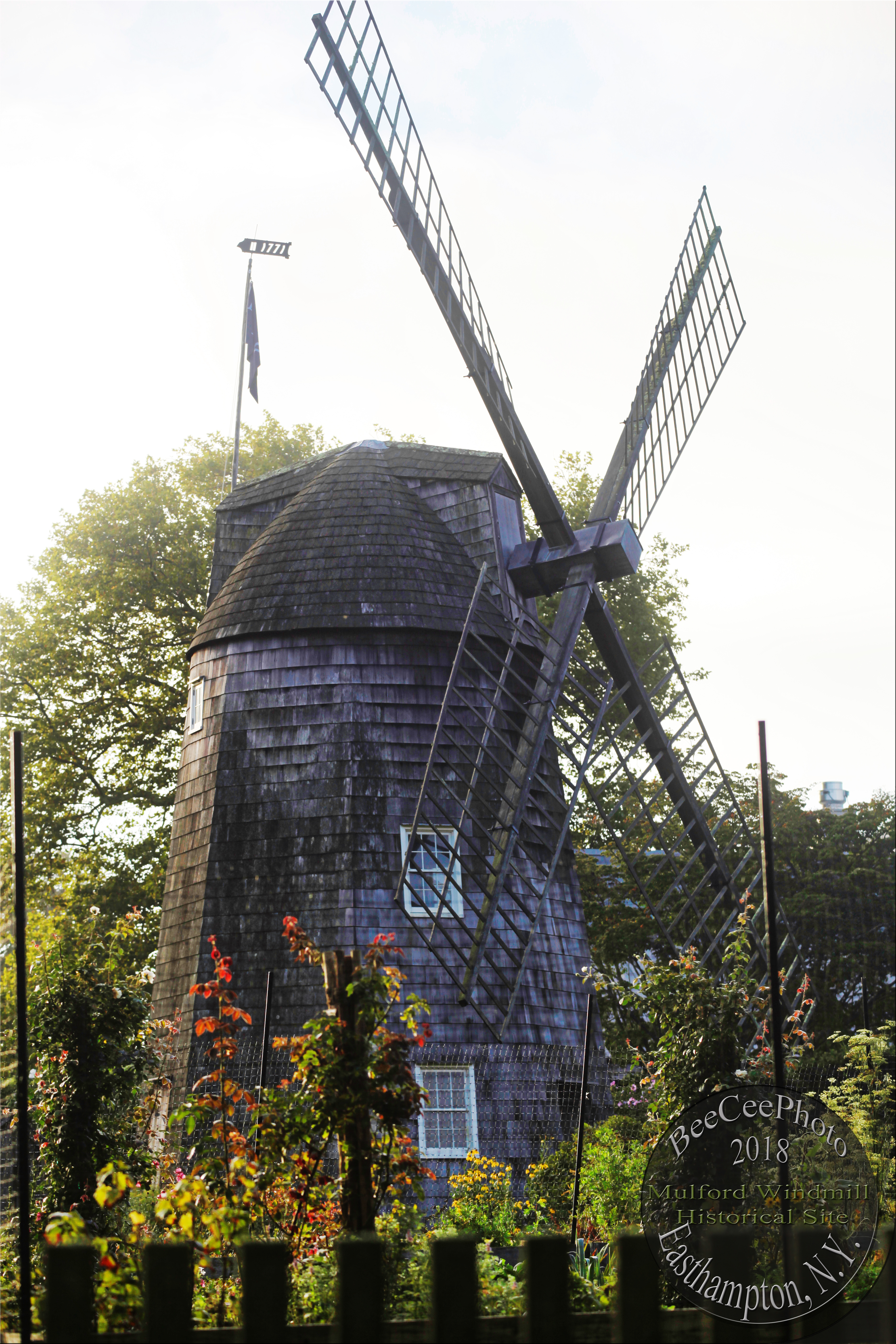
- Pantigo Windmill, September, 2018
- Interactive map of Pantigo Windmill
- Coordinates: 40.9566°N 72.1911°W

Information
- Smock sides: Eight
- No. of sails: Four
- Other information
- Pantigo Windmill
- U.S. Historic district – Contributing property
- Location within New York Location within the United States
- Location: 14 James lane., Easthampton, New York
- Area: less than one acre
- Built: 1644
- Built by: Schellinger, Samuel
- Part of: East Hampton Village District (ID74001309)
- Designated CP: May 5, 1984

The Pantigo Windmill is an octagonal smock mill in Easthampton on Long Island, New York. Bearing a 1771 weathervane on top, the James Lane structure was added to the National Register of Historic Places in 1984 as a contributing property of the East Hampton Village District. (Ref# 74001309)

== History ==
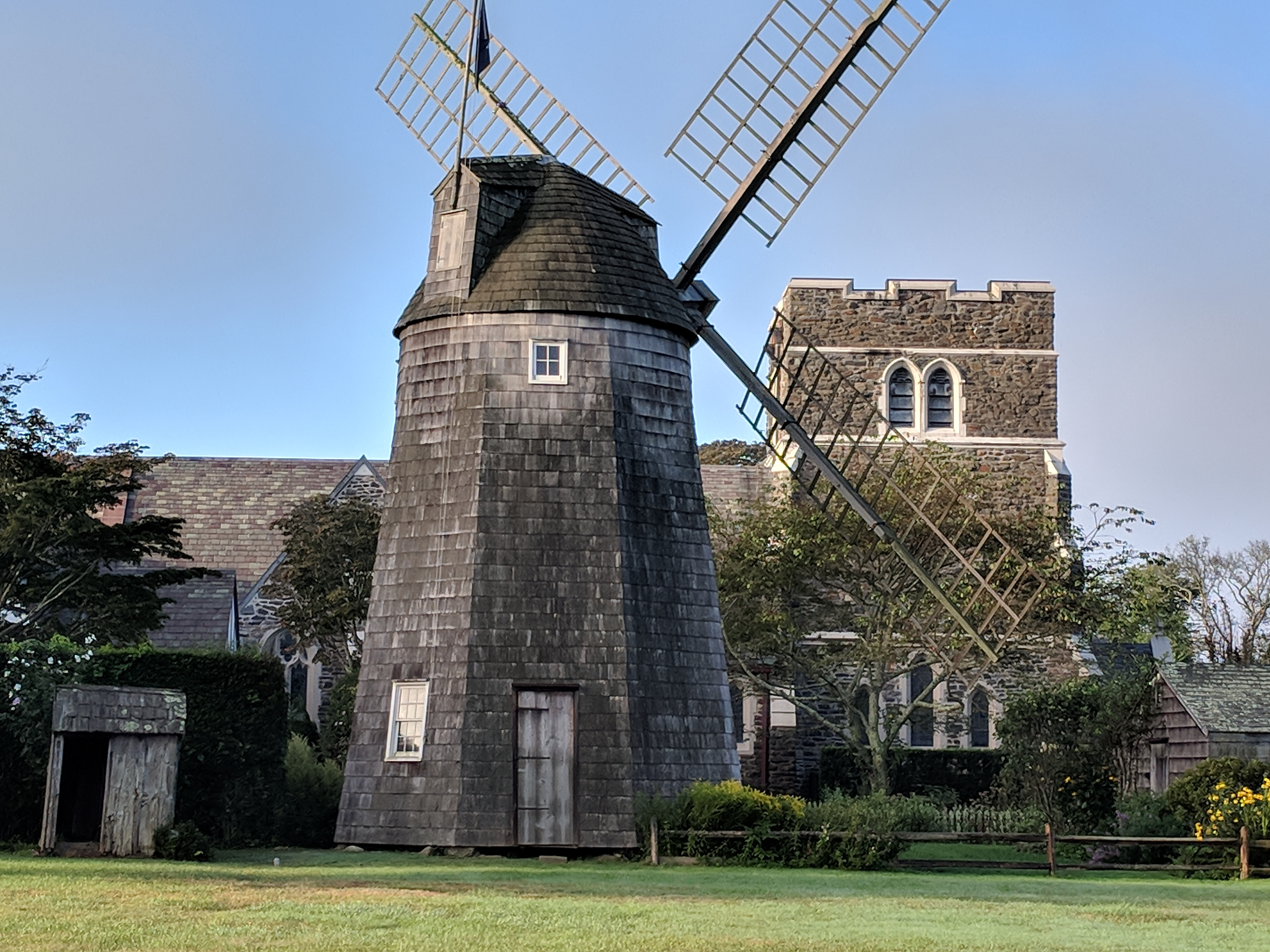
Pantigo Windmill and St. Luke's Church in 2018

The Pantigo Mill was built on Mill Hill on the common at the south end of East Hampton, the third windmill to occupy that site. The Mill Hill had been built up from a natural rise in 1729 when a post mill was moved there. The post mill was replaced by a new windmill in 1771.

Samuel Schellinger began building the Pantigo Windmill for Huntting Miller in March 1804. He built the Pantigo Mill and the Beebe Windmill in East Hampton. He also built a windmill in Setauket, Long Island in the 1820s. According to his apprentice, William Baker, Schellinger built windmills at Brooklyn and Block Island, also in New York; and Nantucket, Massachusetts. He also did considerable work on boats at Sag Harbor.

Schellinger charged Huntting Miller for 83 days of his own time and an additional 144 days for the work of his assistants, James Raynor, Mathew and Richard. Also assisting on the mill was David Sherril, an East Hampton carpenter whose account book shows that he repaired several local windmills. In the summer of 1804 Sherril charged Huntting Miller for thirty-five days work on the mill. In June Sherril noted he was framing the mill, and in August he was working on "the Mills running gear."

Three months later the owners of the windmill across the common also began constructing a windmill with intermediate gearing. This was to replace their mill built in 1769. This second windmill, the Gardiner Mill, was being built under the direction of Nathaniel Dominy IV. Dominy V does not mention the Pantigo windmill until 1821, when in his accounts he noted on a repair bill, "put Shaft beam to Mill" for Huntting Miller.

Laws in the 18th century accommodated the miller. One story of Miller was that as the minister was doing a sermon he heard the whispering wind outside. "Church will be dismissed, Miller, go to your mill and grind." The law of the town specified that the minister's grist was to be the first ground.

== Ownership ==
Ownership of the Pantigo changed over a period of years. Huntting Miller left his property and the windmill to his grandson, Captain William Hedges, who acquired the mill in 1832. In 1834 Hedges had the mill's machinery put in good order, as Nathaniel Dominy V charged him for sixteen days labor to "put in shaft Cogs and Rounds." In 1845 William Hedges sold the mill to David A. Hedges, who moved it to his property on the north side of Pantigo Road about one half mile east of the village. David Hedges sold the mill to Hiram Sandford, who moved it to the corner of Pantigo Road and Egypt Lane, where it stood until 1917.

Based on its being located for 72 years on Pantigo Road, the mill became known by its geography. Some time before 1865, Sandford sold the mill to Nathaniel Dominy VII, who also owned the Old Hook Mill. An inscription on the stairway in the Pantigo Mill indicates that Dominy was repairing the mill in February 1878 and that he "Commenced to Grind" on 12 June 1878. Dominy had only a year of service from his mill following these repairs, for in August 1879 a storm, described as the "heaviest since 1811", "twisted off" the iron cross holding the sails stocks." Dominy never put the mill back in running order.

The Pantigo Windmill was purchased in 1917 by Gustav Buek, who moved it to the rear of Mulford Farmhouse on the East Hampton Common. After Mr. Buek died, the Village of East Hampton acquired his seventeenth-century house and the windmill.

Because the American writer and actor John Howard Payne had visited this house, owned by his grandfather when Payne was a child in the early 19th century, the village called it "Home, Sweet Home", after his famous song of 1822. The song made him famous and was especially popular among soldiers on both sides during the American Civil War. The Village undertook extensive repairs to the mill in 1978-1979 and 1984–85. The house and mill are classified as contributing properties to the East Hampton Historic District.

== Aquebogue Windmill ==
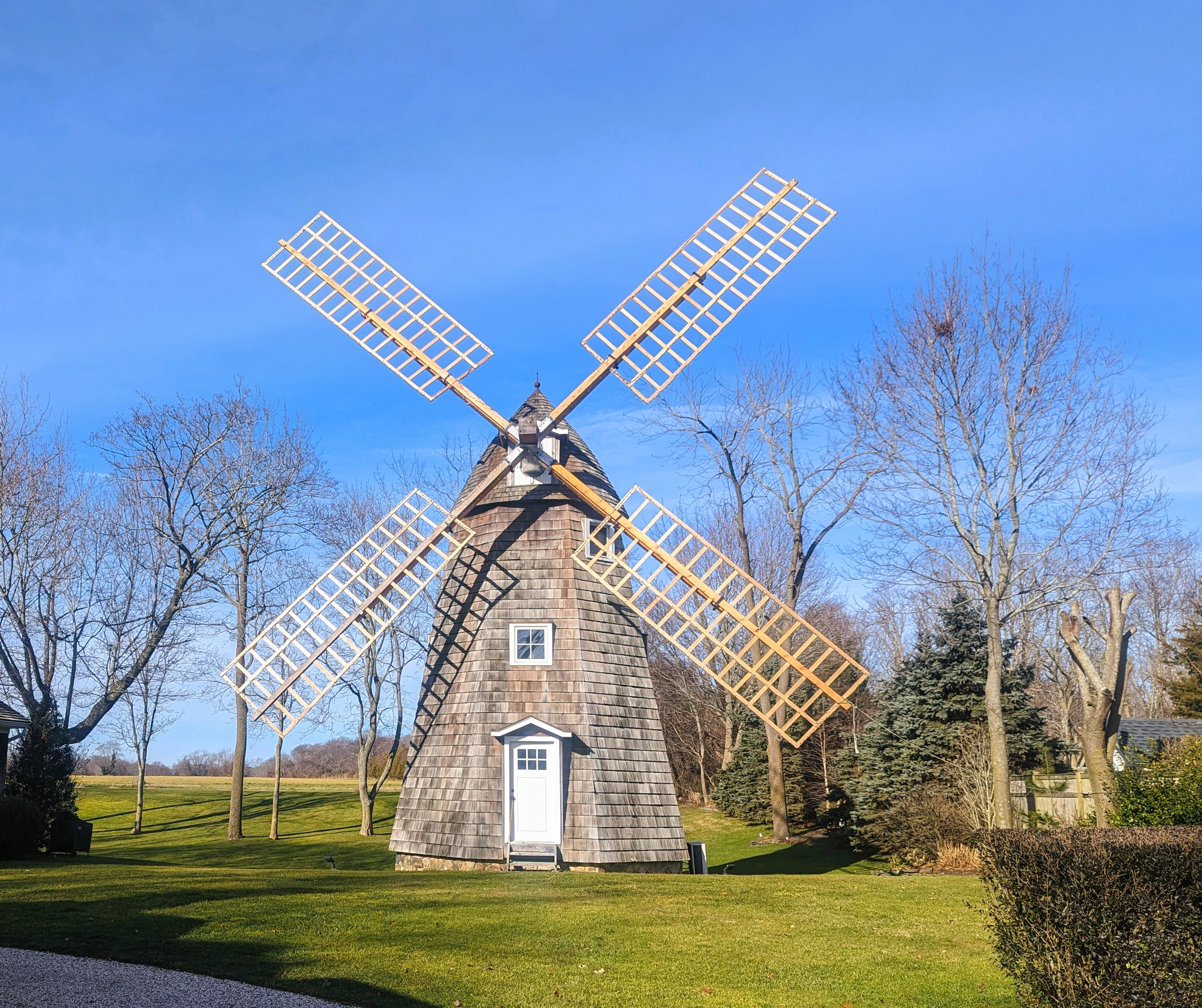
Replica of the Pantigo Windmill at Aquebogue

On the North Fork at Aquebogue, a hamlet of Riverhead, New York, a historically accurate replica was built. Architect Don Feiler did preliminary sketches for owner Bob Bocksel and the windmill went up in 2008. In May 2022, this windmill was damaged by a strong windstorm; the sails caught in the arms of the tree and were damaged severely. Additionally, the lattice, which is the grid to which the sails are lashed with custom-fabricated steel and iron brackets, also suffered damage. This lattice plays an essential role in supporting and stabilizing the sails, so any damage to it impacts the windmill's functionality. Bocksel repaired the windmill himself. Sylvester Manor, a nonprofit organization focused on historic preservation, happened to have three replacement sails that had been sitting unused in a barn since the 1950s. These sails and an additional sail fabricated from scratch were used in the restoration. In order to improve the windmill's structure, the main shaft was wrapped in sheet metal to prevent warping. A maple that stood too close to the windmill was also taken down.

== See also ==
- Samuel Schellinger
