= Dominy craftsmen =

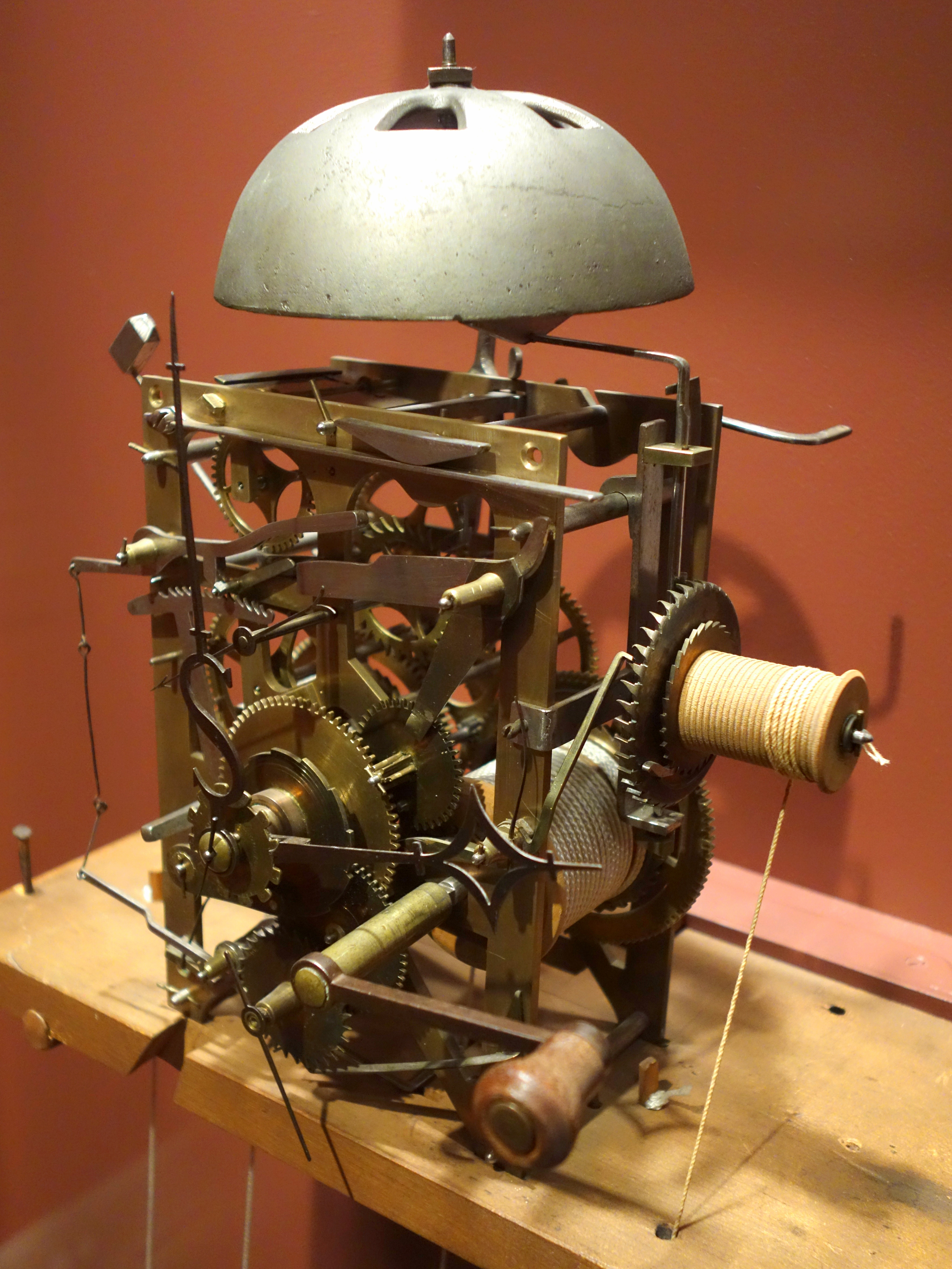
Clockwork with alarm mechanism, made by Nathaniel Dominy V, 1799 - Winterthur Museum

The Dominy craftsmen were a family made up of American clock, furniture, and watch makers in East Hampton, New York. Nathaniel Dominy IV, his son, Nathaniel V, and his grandson, Felix Dominy were active from about 1760 to 1840. Works created by the Dominys are in the collections of Winterthur Museum, Garden, and Library. As of 2022, a museum dedicated to the Dominys is under construction in East Hampton.

== Family ==
The Dominy family established their roots in East Hampton, Long Island, N.Y., approximately 21 years after the town's founding in 1648. The focus of their craftsmanship primarily revolved around woodwork, with clockmaker patriarch Nathaniel IV (1737–1812), his son Nathaniel V (1770–1852), and grandson Felix (1800–1868) all contributing to this craft. Additionally, the work of Nathaniel VII (1827–1910), the son of Felix, who was involved in creating small tools, clocks and repaired watches.

Nathaniel IV (July 25, 1737 – 1812) was the pioneer of woodworking and clockmaking within the Dominy family. He was born to Nathaniel Dominy (1714–1778) and Elizabeth Eyres (1717–1781). Nathaniel IV held the position of town supervisor from 1777 to 1779 and also took on the responsibility of overseeing the welfare of the less fortunate as an Overseer of the poor. It was this clockmaker that improved on the innovation of using gears to turn windmills to face the prevailing winds.

Nathaniel V (January 16, 1770 – May 29, 1852) not only took on the woodworking and clockmaking trade but also undertook the construction of Hook Mill, a grain gristmill, in 1806. Alongside Jonathan Osborn and Elisha and Timothy Miller, Nathaniel V co-owned a sawmill. Similar to his father, he also served as an overseer of the poor. In 1795, Nathaniel V married Temperance Miller (1774–1849), and they had children named John (born 1796), Nancy (1797–1886), and Felix (1800–1868).

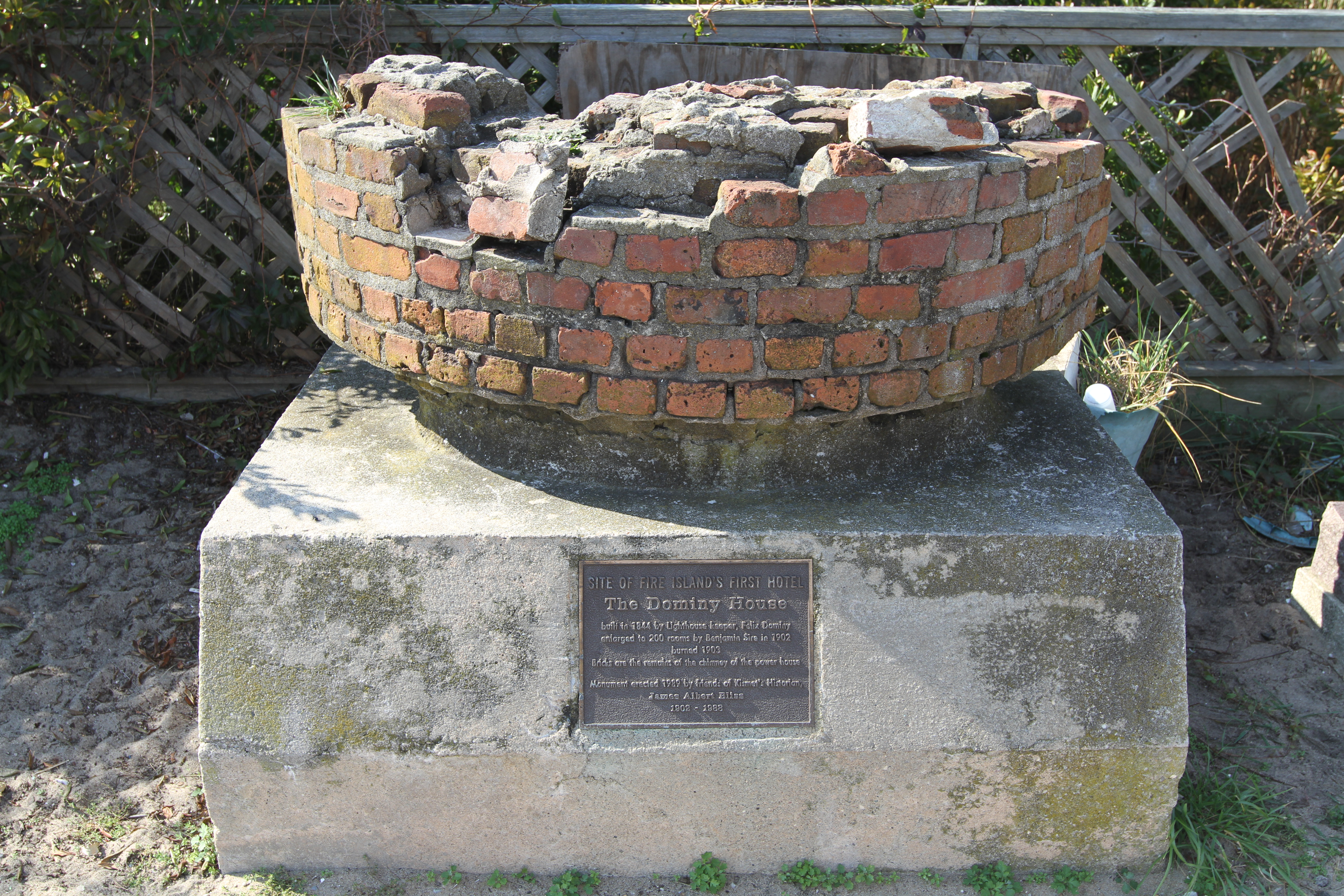
Fire Island Dominy House plaque

Felix Dominy (February 12, 1800 – 1868) exhibited a strong dedication to both the military and politics, serving as a major in the New York State Militia. He held the position of town supervisor in 1834 and 1835. Around 1834, Felix decided to shift his focus away from his craft activities and subsequently relocated to Fire Island, where he assumed the role of Lighthouse keeper. By 1847, he operated a hotel on Fire Island during the summer months and resided in Bay Shore, N.Y., during the winter. Felix died on December 20, 1868, in Buffalo, New York, while visiting his daughter Mary D. Tyson.

Nathaniel Dominy VII (1827–1910) managed a jewelry store, specializing in clock and watch repairs, while also offering Daguerreotype services. Additionally, he was also a general handyman, assisting with various tasks and projects. The Hook Windmill was operated by Nathaniel VII and his sons from 1859 until 1908.

The Winterthur Museum houses furniture and clocks crafted by the talented members of the Dominy family, along with preserved sections of their original workshops.

== Workshops ==
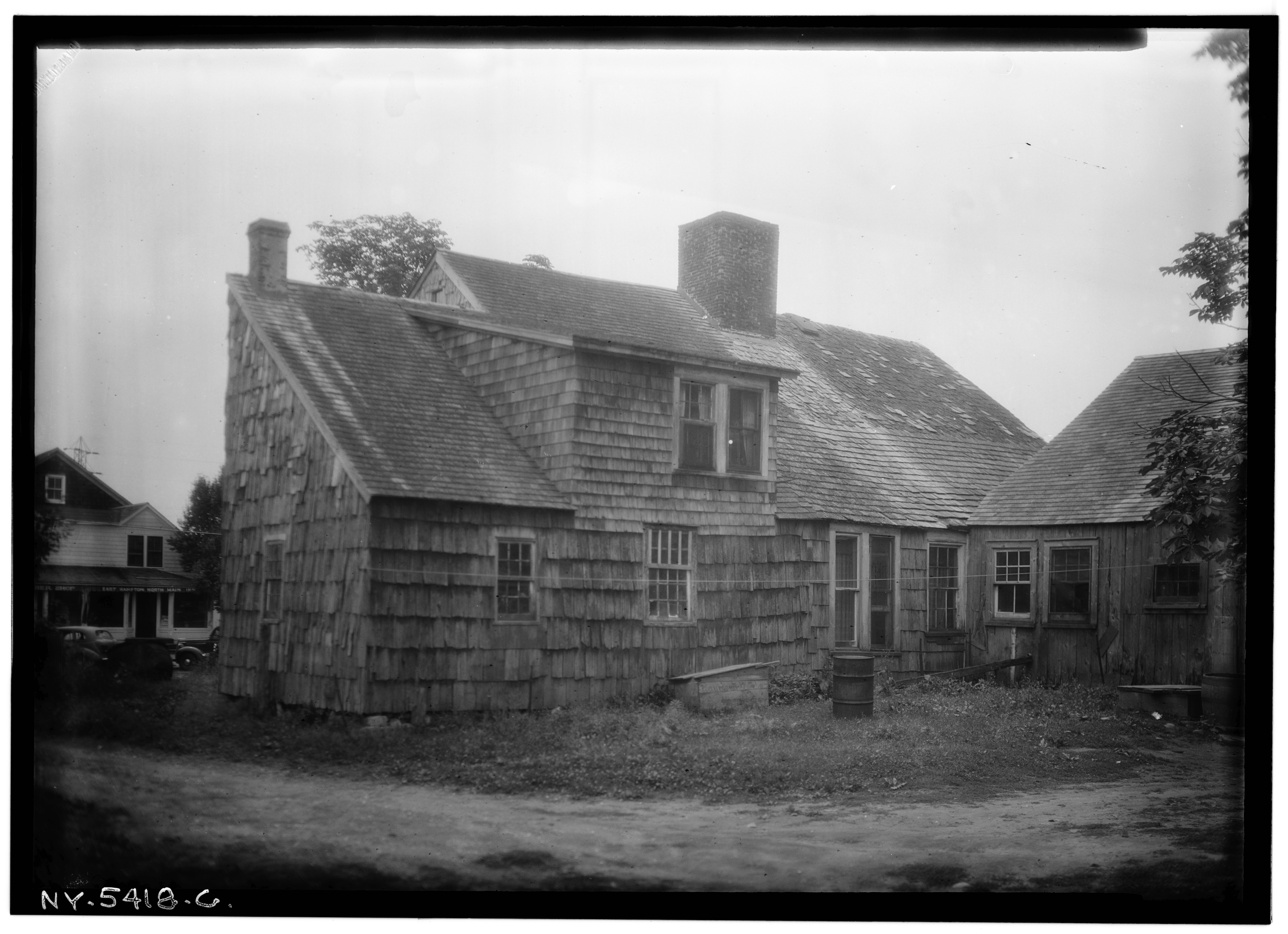
Dominy House, East Hampton

The Dominy home (c. 1765), woodworking shop (1791), and clock shop (c. 1798) sat on Main Street in East Hampton.

The Dominy home was demolished in 1946 and the family shops were moved from their original locations. The shop buildings were most recently located at Mulford Farm.

In 1957, the Winterthur Museum, Garden and Library acquired tools, equipment, furnishings, and fittings from the Dominy shops. Reconstructions of the shops have been on display at Winterthur since 1960. Winterthur curator Charles F. Hummel wrote an influential book on the Dominy craftsmen in 1968.

== Museum ==
In 2021, it was announced the Dominy family home would be rebuilt on Main Street using architectural specifications from the Historical American Buildings Survey. As of January 2022, the East Hampton Historical Society is in the process of restoring the home and shops for use as a museum.

By December 2023 the first phase of the reconstruction had concluded. According to Robert Hefner, a windmill historian, the clock shop holds great importance due to the presence of a significant forge and fireplace. Once the restoration of the clock shop's interior is completed, it will mark a major milestone towards achieving the overall restoration goal. Mr. Hefner also mentions that the museum already possesses a substantial collection of donated furniture and tools, further contributing to the completeness of the exhibit. Ultimately, the responsibility falls on the historical society to assemble the exhibit, develop an interpretive program, and ultimately open it to the public.

== See also ==
- Samuel Schellinger
