= Samuel "Fish Hook" Mulford =

American colonial farmer, merchant and politician (1644–1725)

Samuel "Fish Hook" Mulford (1644–1725) was a farmer, merchant, and member of the New York General Assembly for 15 years. He got his nickname when he went to London in 1704 to protest the tax on whale oil, which he used in farming. Warned beforehand of the sly workings of pickpockets in London, Mulford lined his pockets with fishhooks to foil the would-be thieves and became known for this tactic.

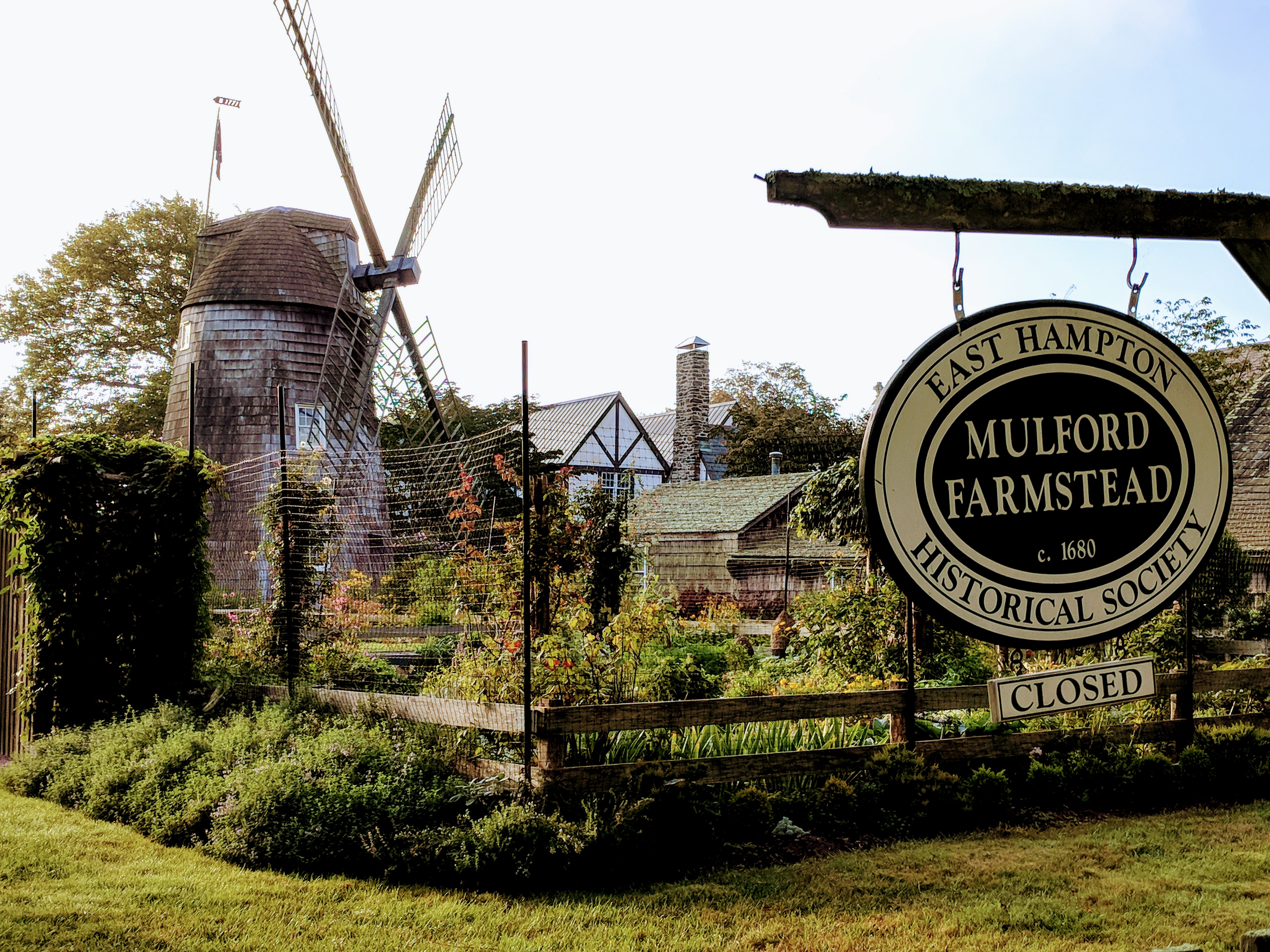
Farmstead sign of the Mulford Farmhouse

The old Mulford farmhouse is one of the oldest in Suffolk County, New York. Mulford bought the property in 1712 when Josiah Hobart, who built it, died.

Mulford was a legislator in all the governments of the Province of New York during his time. He served in the New York General Assembly from 1705-1720.

He was also a whale oil merchant. He had warehouses on Northwest Harbor, east side, along with other merchants in his village. Merchants Path is the name of the road to the warehouses.
