= Beebe Windmill =

Windmill in Bridgehampton, New York, United States

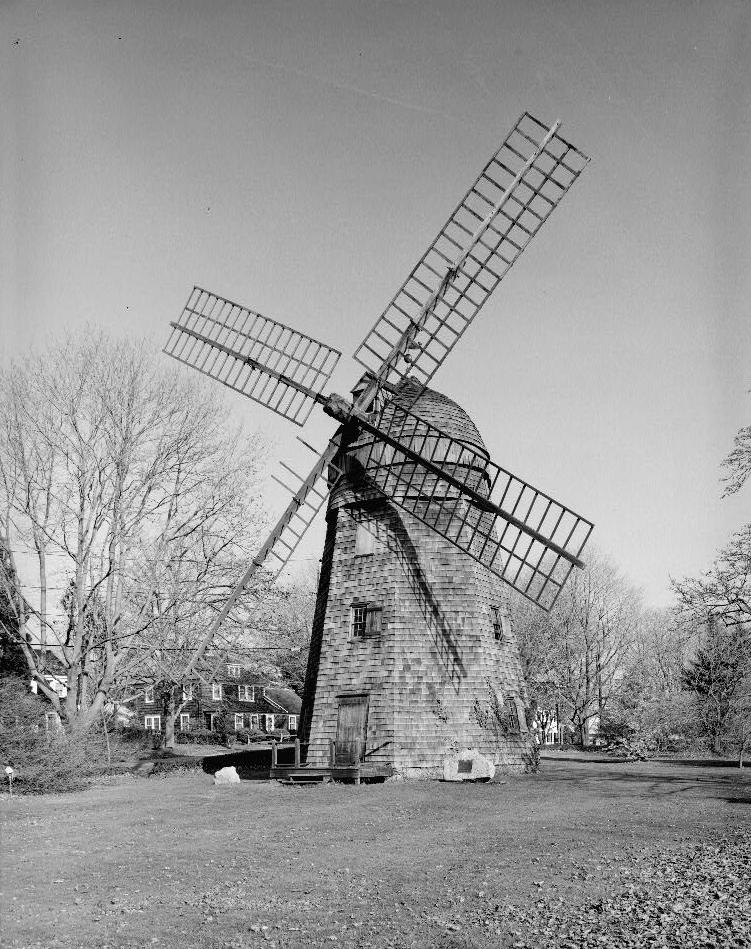
- Beebe windmill
- Interactive map of Beebe Windmill

Origin
- Mill name: Beebe mill
- Mill location: Bridgehampton, New York
- Coordinates: 40.9343°N 72.3006°W
- Year built: 1820

Information
- Purpose: Corn mill
- Type: Smock mill
- Storeys: Four-story smock
- Base storeys: A few courses of brick
- Smock sides: Eight-sided smock
- No. of sails: Four sails
- Type of sails: Common sails
- Windshaft: Wood
- Winding: Fantail
- Fantail blades: Eight blades
- Auxiliary power: Steam engine
- No. of pairs of millstones: Two pairs
- Other information: Named after Lester Beebe, for whom it was built.
Beebe Windmill
U.S. National Register of Historic Places
Architect	Tabor, Pardon T.
MPS	Long Island Wind and Tide Mills TR
NRHP reference No.	78001918
Added to NRHP	December 27, 1978

Beebe Windmill is a historic mill located at the southeast corner of Ocean Road and Hildreth Avenue in Bridgehampton, New York.

== History ==
Beebe windmill was built in 1820 at Sag Harbor for Lester Beebe. Built on the wharf, it was moved to Sherrills Hill (Oakland Cemetery) where it also served as notifier to the town of arriving whaleship. After his death, it was bought by Rose Gelston who had it moved to Bridgehampton where it worked for more than 50 years. In 1882, it was bought by James Sanford and moved to a site south of the railroad. Later, a steam engine was installed to provide power when the wind was not blowing. In 1888, the mill was repaired by millwright Nathaniel Dominy VII of Long Island. It was moved to a site north of the railroad in 1889. It was operated here until 1915 by the Bridgehampton Milling Company. In that year, it was bought by John E. Berwind and moved to his summer estate, Minden.

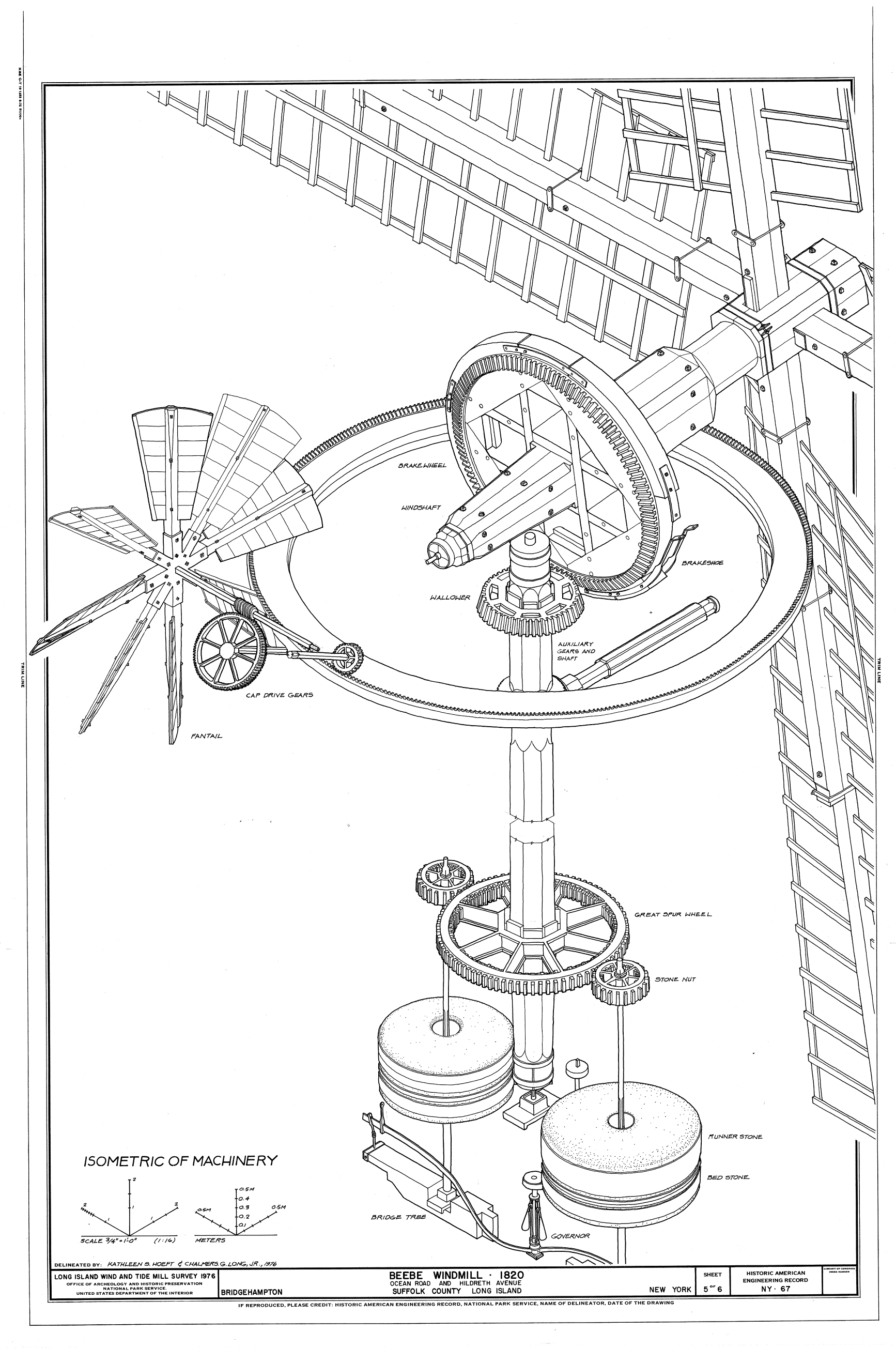
The machinery of Beebe windmill, in HAER drawing

It is described in a 1977 Historic American Engineering Record (HAER) description as "one of the first Long Island windmills to have a fly, regulators, and cast iron gears" and is the only one with its original versions of those. It is also the only Long Island windmill to have a "decorative" design. With these features it is "the only surviving Long Island windmill which compares to English windmills of the same period." The windmill was added to the National Register of Historic Places in 1978.

== Description ==
Beebe windmill is a four-story smock mill with an ogee cap winded by a fantail. Four Common sails are carried on a wooden windshaft, as is the wooden clasp arm brake wheel. This drives a cast iron wallower carried at the top of the upright shaft. At its lower end the cast iron great spur wheel drives two pairs of overdrift millstones.

== See also ==
List of windmills in New York

Samuel Schellinger
