= Smock mill =

Type of windmill

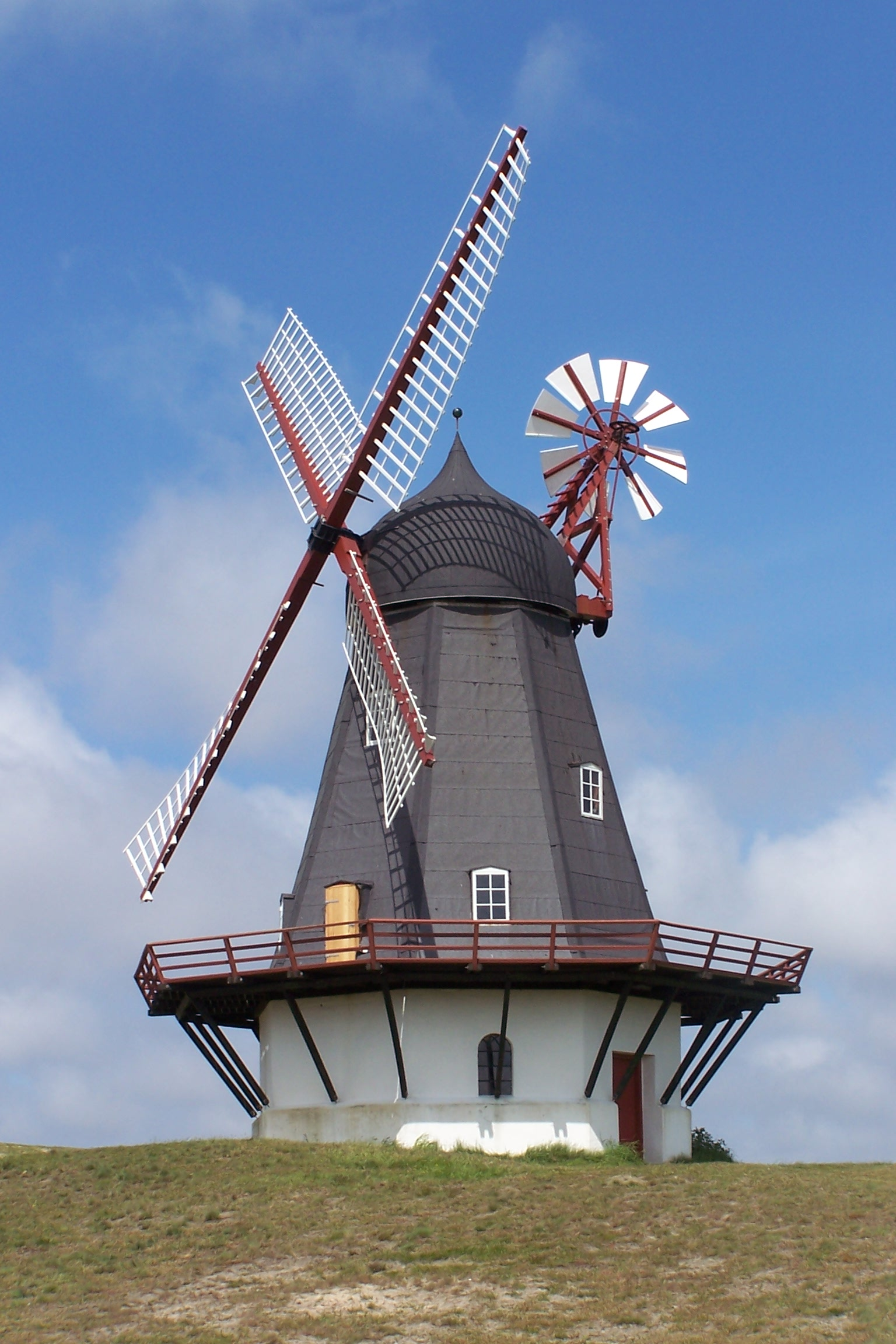
Smock mill with fantail (Sønderho, Fanø, Denmark)

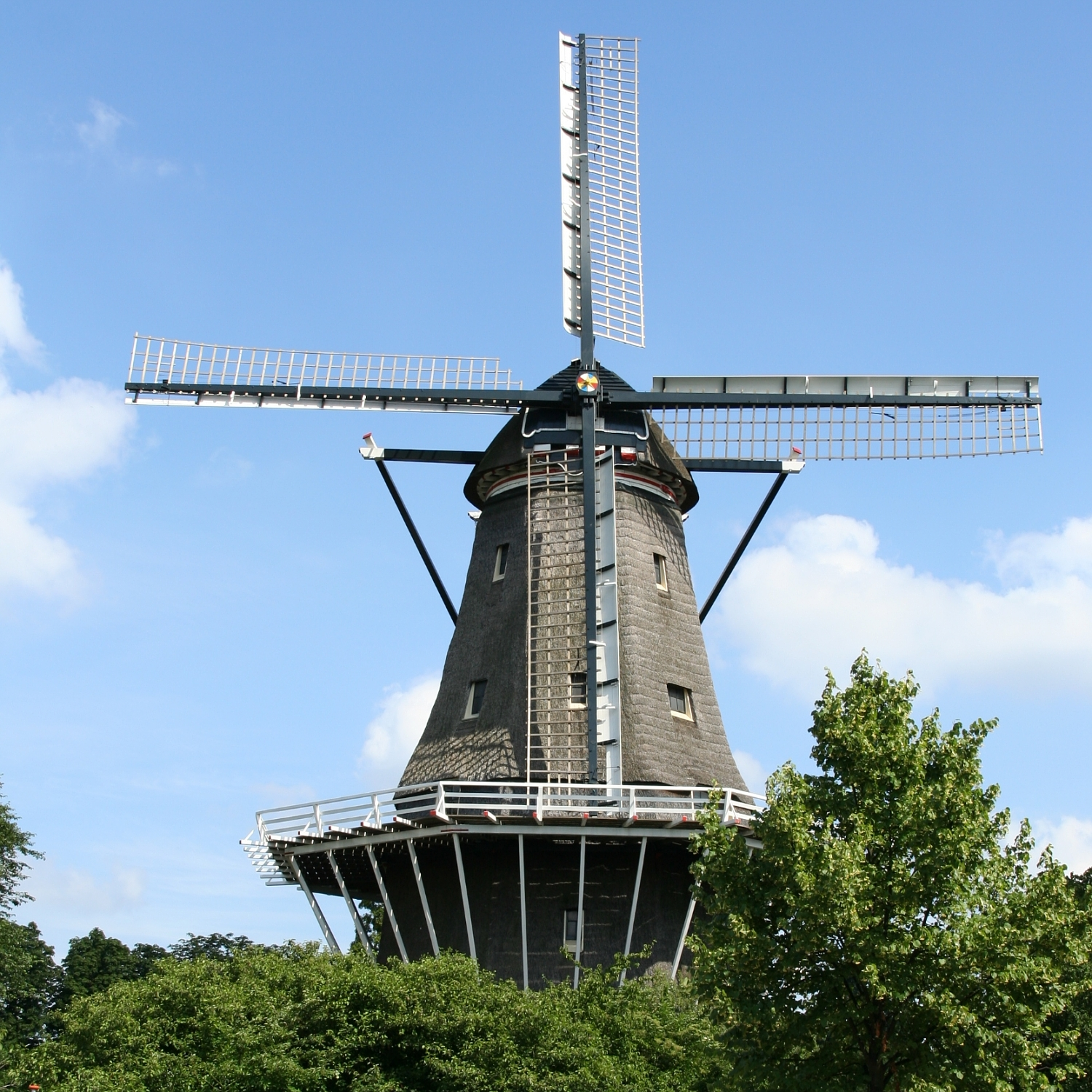
Smock mill in Amsterdam

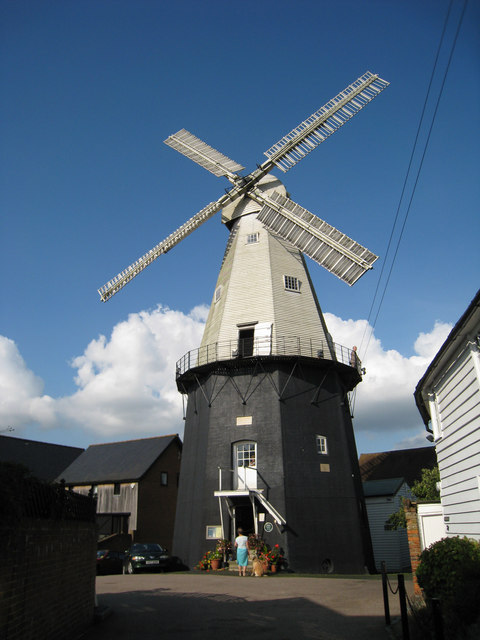
Union Mill, Cranbrook, Kent

The smock mill is a type of windmill that consists of a sloping, horizontally weatherboarded, thatched, or shingled tower, usually with six or eight sides. It is topped with a roof or cap that rotates to bring the sails into the wind. This type of windmill got its name from its resemblance to smocks worn by farmers in an earlier period.

== Construction ==
Smock mills differ from tower mills, which are usually conical rather than hexagonal or octagonal, and built from brick or stone masonry instead of timber. The majority of smock mills are octagonal in plan, with a lesser number hexagonal, such as Killick's Mill, Meopham. A very small number of smock mills were decagonal or dodecagonal in plan, an example of the latter being at Wicken, Cambridgeshire.

== Distribution ==
Smock mills exist in Europe and particularly in England, where they were common, particularly in the county of Kent, where the tallest surviving smock mill in the United Kingdom, Union Mill, can be found at Cranbrook. They reached their heyday in the early part of the 19th century, after which the advent of steam power started the decline of the windmill. The East End of Long Island has the greatest concentration of smock mills in the U.S., with Beebe Windmill, Hayground Windmill, Pantigo Windmill, Gardiner, Hook Windmill, Gardiner's Island, Watermill, National Links, Southampton/Shinnecock (Cottage), Shelter Island, Wainscott Windmill, four replicas, Little East Neck H.D., Southampton Mini Golf Hook mill, Corwith Farms and Amagansett -Reform Inn, and four cottages, Gin Lane, A.W.B.Wood House & Windmill (Montauk), Edwin DeRose and Quail Hill Farms (Deep Ln).

=== Britain ===
Designed by the civil engineer John Smeaton, Chimney Mill in Spital Tongues, Newcastle upon Tyne was the first five-sailed smock mill in Britain. It was built in 1782 and is the only surviving smock mill in the North East region. However, the sails and original cap are no longer in place.

The oldest surviving smock mill in England (dated to 1650) is located in Lacey Green, Buckinghamshire. The hexagonal mill has been restored by the Chiltern Society.

=== Ireland ===
St Patrick's Tower in Dublin is believed to have once been the largest smock windmill in Europe.

=== United States ===
==== Massachusetts ====
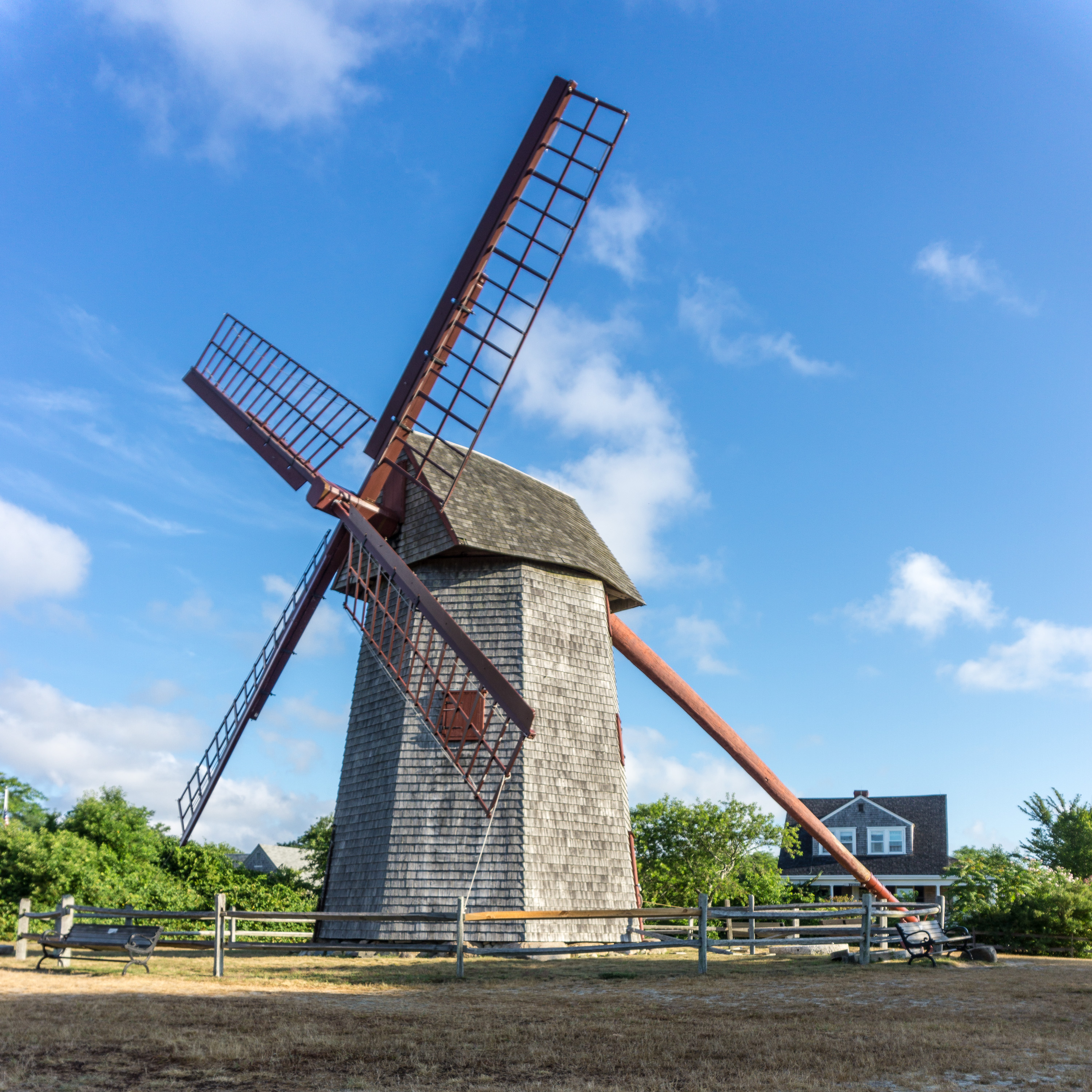
The Old Mill on Nantucket Island

There are two operating smock mills in Massachusetts, one on Nantucket Island and one in Orleans.

"Old Mill" is the oldest functioning mill in the United States, built in 1746 by a Nantucket sailor who had spent time in Holland, Nathan Wilbur. It is the only survivor of four smock mills that once stood on Popsquachet ("windy hill" in the Wampanoag language) overlooking Nantucket town. Until late in the 19th century "Round-Top Mill" on the site of the present New North Cemetery joined them.

The Old Mill was in a derelict condition when it was sold for twenty dollars in 1828 to Jared Gardner for use as "firewood." Instead of dismantling it, Gardner, a carpenter by trade, restored the mill to working condition. It was sold again in 1866 to John Francis Sylvia, a Portuguese miller of Azorean descent, who operated it for many years with his assistant Peter Hoy until it fell into disuse in 1892. In 1897 Miss Caroline French purchased the mill at an auction for $850 and donated it to the Nantucket Historical Association (NHA). The NHA restored it in 1937 and continues to maintain it, grind corn, and guide tours during the summer and early autumn.

The second operating smock mill is found in Orleans, on Cape Cod. It was erected about 1793 on Kendrick's Hill as Elisha Cook's Mill, on land that later became Orleans. In 1839 it was moved to Young's Hill, and known as Jonathan Young's Mill after one of its five owners. In 1897 Captain Hunt, a wealthy seaman, brought it by oxen and barge to his estate in Hyannisport. Eventually the Gove family bought the Hunt property, and in 1983 gave the mill to the Orleans Historical Society, which donated it to the town of Orleans. It was disassembled, restored, and reassembled at its present site there. The site is open for visitors during the summer.

==== New York ====
Farmers on the east end of Long Island in the state of New York have used smock mills since 1795 to process grain.

==== Rhode Island ====
The Jamestown Windmill built in 1787 on North Road is a smock mill. It is on Wanton Farm and currently belongs to the Jamestown Historical Society. It is on the National Register of Historic Places.
