= Amagansett Mill Company =

American windmill company

Coordinates: 40°58′28″N 72°08′40″W

The Amagansett Mill Company (1829–1841) was an American company in Amagansett, New York. The windmill that it operated burned down in 1924.

== Establishment ==
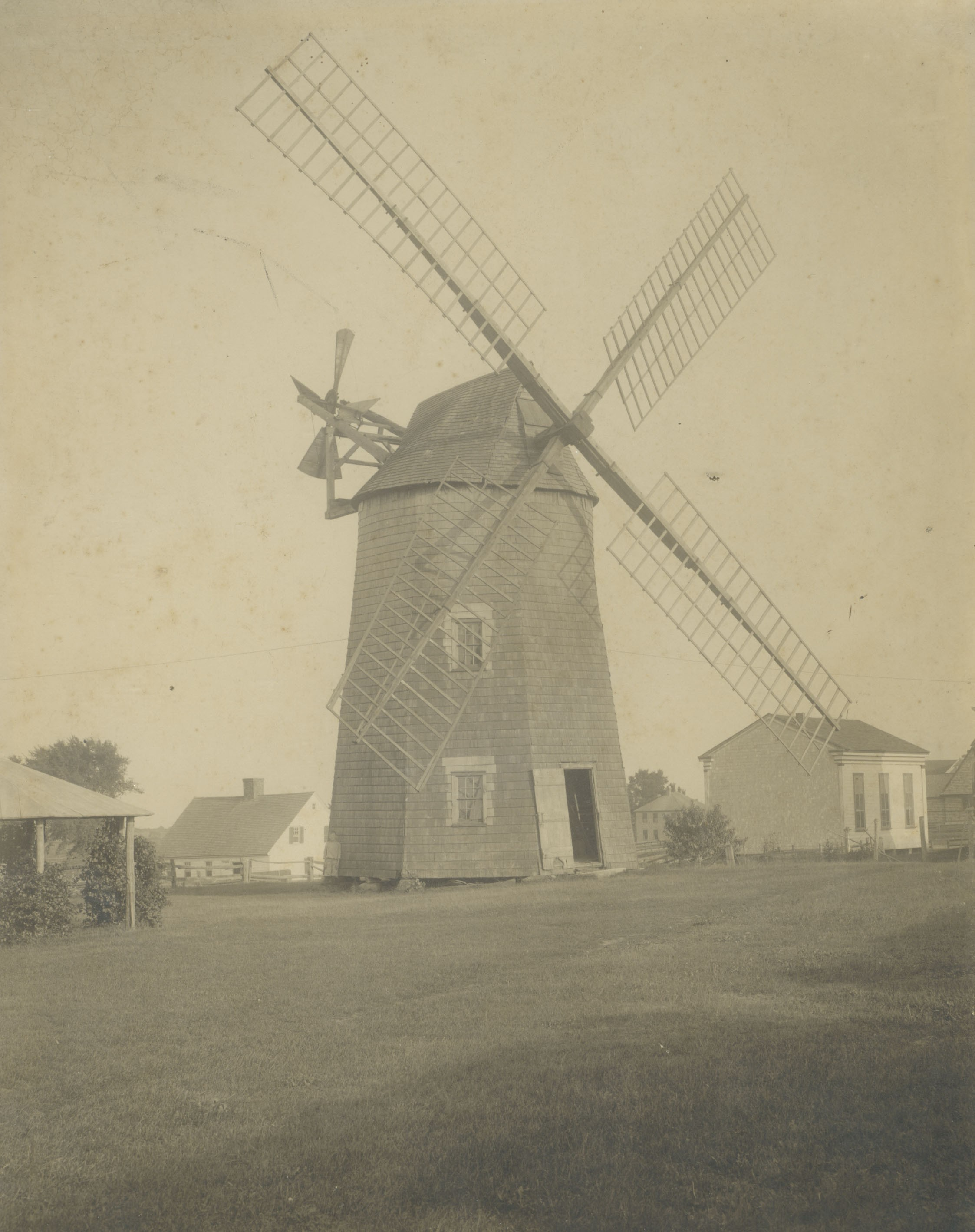
Amagansett Windmill

The Amagansett Mill Company was a milling enterprise active from 1829 to 1841 in East Hampton, New York. Its operations were conducted on the grounds where the current railroad station is located, a site chosen after the company moved the mill there in 1829. Initially constructed in 1814 by Samuel Schellinger, the four-story tall smock mill was a central feature of the area until its destruction by fire in 1924.

== History ==
John Baker (1809-1882), an integral figure in the company, managed the financial records as the agent and treasurer. His meticulous account-keeping provided a detailed ledger of the company's transactions, including purchases and work conducted, which has been preserved in historical archives. Ownership of the Amagansett Mill Company was shared among prominent local figures, including Thomas Edwards, Nathaniel Hand, Henry Baker, Samuel L. Mulford, Thomas J. Mulford, Ananias Baker, Charles R. Hand, Henry Schellinger, Talmage Barns, and Samuel Schellinger. Samuel Schellinger, an Amagansett craftsman, was credited with the original construction of the mill. In colonial times Amagansett was primarily agrarian, with farms owned by the sons of the founders of East Hampton whom expanded east when the threat of Indians declined. The oldest house in Amagansett dates to 1725. Originally Montaukett Indians were inhabitants of Amagansett, which translated means “place of good water.”

The company's constitution, following the list of shareholders, outlined the governance structure and management articles for the enterprise. The financial investment in the Amagansett Mill Company was substantial for the period, with total expenses reaching $1,042.09. This figure encompassed the costs associated with the initial purchase, the required work on the mill's structure, and the expenses related to its relocation.

== Sale of the windmill ==
Windmills played a large role in the community, they converted wind energy to power machinery that ground grain for east end farmers. There were laws to guide the community in how much of the crop was the millers share for providing the grist-mill.

In a significant transaction in 1871, the company divested from the mill by selling it to R.W. Ashby, an Englishman whose ownership was brief. He sold the mill seven years later in 1878 to Abraham Stratton Parsons (1829-1896). Parsons, recognizing the mill's value and potential, relocated it to Windmill Lane in Amagansett. It was here that the Parsons family continued to operate the mill, contributing to its status as a local institution for many years thereafter.

== Loss ==
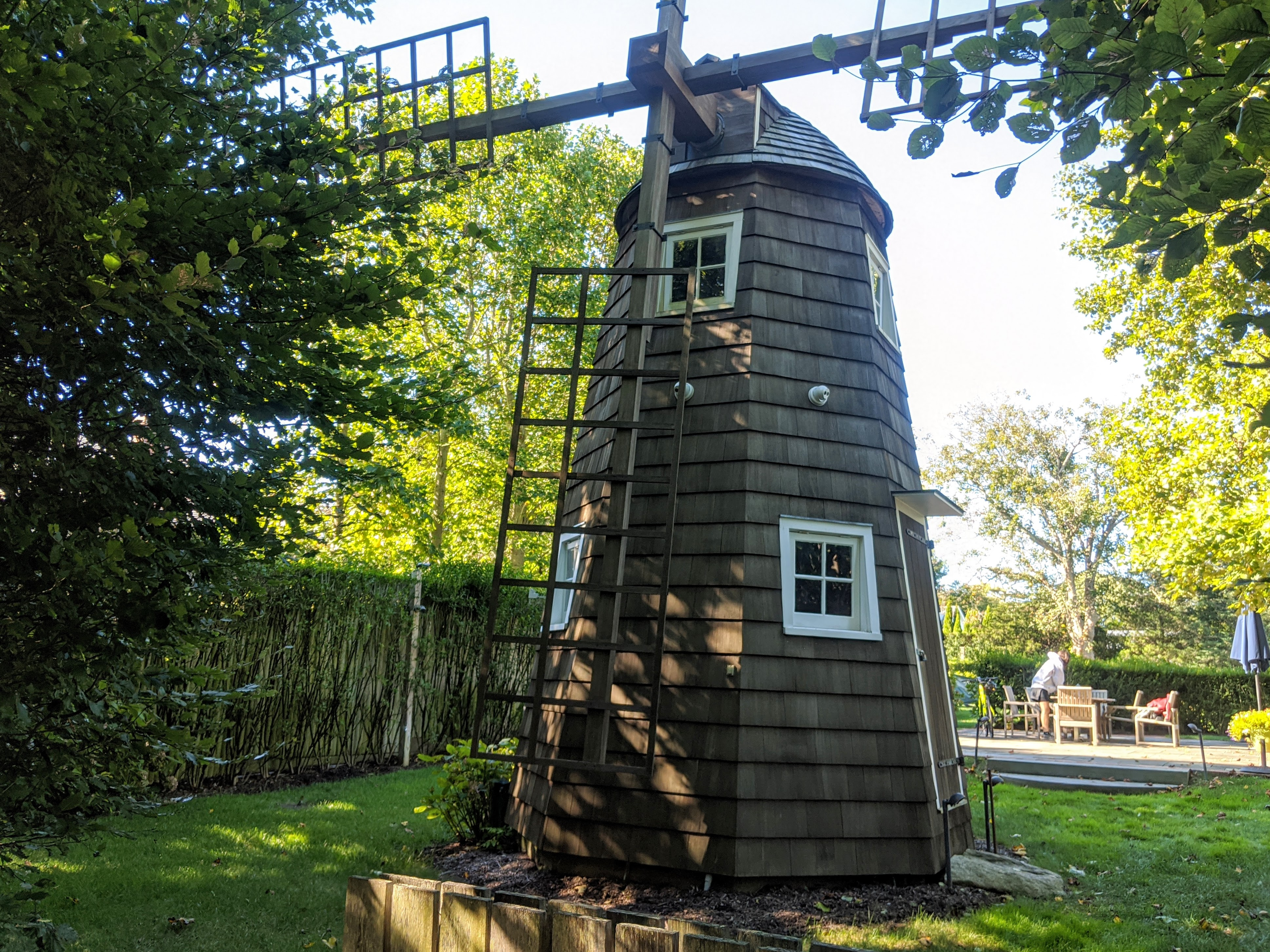
Amagansett Mill - Reform Inn Replica in September 2020

Tragedy struck on July 8, 1924, when the mill was engulfed in flames and ultimately reduced to ashes. The fire was attributed to a gasoline engine that was being stored inside the mill. This engine was not merely for operational purposes; it played a crucial role in providing water to the Windmill cottage and the neighboring Mulford cottages. Despite the loss, the legacy of the Amagansett Mill Company was commemorated in 1956 with the construction of a smaller replica at the original site. This act served to honor the historical significance of the mill and its impact on the local community.

== See also ==
- List of windmills in New York
