= Charles F. Hummel =

American museum curator (1932–2025)

- Born: Charles Frederick Hummel; September 16, 1932; New York City, U.S.
- Died: September 14, 2025 (aged 92)
- Education: City College of New York (BA); University of Delaware (MA)
- Occupations: Curator, author, educator
- Employer: Winterthur Museum, Garden and Library (Winterthur, Delaware)

Charles Frederick Hummel Jr. (September 16, 1932 – September 14, 2025) was an American curator, author and educator who worked at the Winterthur Museum, Garden and Library from 1955 to 1991, concluding his career as senior deputy director for museum and library.

== Life and career ==
Hummel was born in the Brooklyn borough of New York City in 1932, to Helen Marie Yost and Charles Frederick Hummel Sr. He received a Bachelor of Arts degree from the City College of New York in 1953 and a Master of Arts degree from the Winterthur Program in Early American Culture at the University of Delaware in 1955. He wrote his thesis on The Influence of English Design Books upon the Philadelphia Cabinetmaker, 1760–1780. His scholarship focused on the Dominy craftsmen.

He began his career at the Winterthur Museum as a curatorial assistant on June 6, 1955. He served a stint in the United States Army from 1956 to 1958 before returning to the museum, where he became an assistant curator on September 6, 1958, with the additional role of assistant director of the Index of Early American Cultures. Over the ensuing decades, Hummel gained promotions to associate curator in 1960, senior curator and head of the curatorial division, deputy director for collections, and senior deputy director for museum and library in 1989. He helped develop world-class scientific conservation laboratories at Winterthur in 1969 and establish the Winterthur/University of Delaware Program in Art Conservation in the 1970s. He convened a 1973 meeting at Winterthur that resulted in the formation of the National Conservation Advisory Council and the National Institute for Conservation, which became Heritage Preservation. He also published several books that are "considered landmarks in the field." Hummel retired at the end of 1991 and received the title of curator emeritus.

Hummel received numerous awards and honors, including the Allied Professionals Special Recognition Award from the American Institute for Conservation, the Katherine Coffey Award from Mid-Atlantic Association of Museums, the 2012 Distinguished Service Award from the American Association of Museums, and an honorary doctorate from the University of Delaware in 2013. Winterthur named its endowed head of conservation position the Charles F. Hummel Director of Conservation in his honor in 2015.

In retirement, Hummel stayed active in professional leadership and service. He served on the boards or advisory committees of numerous organizations, including the Chipstone Foundation, the Wood Turning Center, the American Alliance of Museums, Strawbery Banke Museum, several house museums, and the Institute of Museum and Library Services. He continued to teach classes as an adjunct full professor at the University of Delaware and volunteers as a tour guide at the Winterthur Museum.

He was married to Marlene Simons and had four children. Hummell died at his home on September 14, 2025, two days before his 93rd birthday. His exceptional contributions to the Winterthur museum were honored in a blog post by the museum in early October of 2025.

== Publications ==
- Hummel, Charles F. (1968). With Hammer in Hand: The Dominy Craftsmen of East Hampton, New York. University of Virginia Press. OCLC 712602.
- Hummel, Charles F. (1976). A Winterthur Guide to American Chippendale Furniture: Middle Atlantic and Southern Colonies. New York: Crown Publishers. ISBN 9780517527832. OCLC 2137192.
- Garvan, Beatrice B.; Hummel, Charles F. (1982). The Pennsylvania Germans: A Celebration of Their Arts, 1683-1850. Philadelphia Museum of Art. ISBN 9780876330487. OCLC 8805762.
