= Mulford Farmhouse =

Historic house in New York, United States

- U.S. National Register of Historic Places
- U.S. Historic district – Contributing property
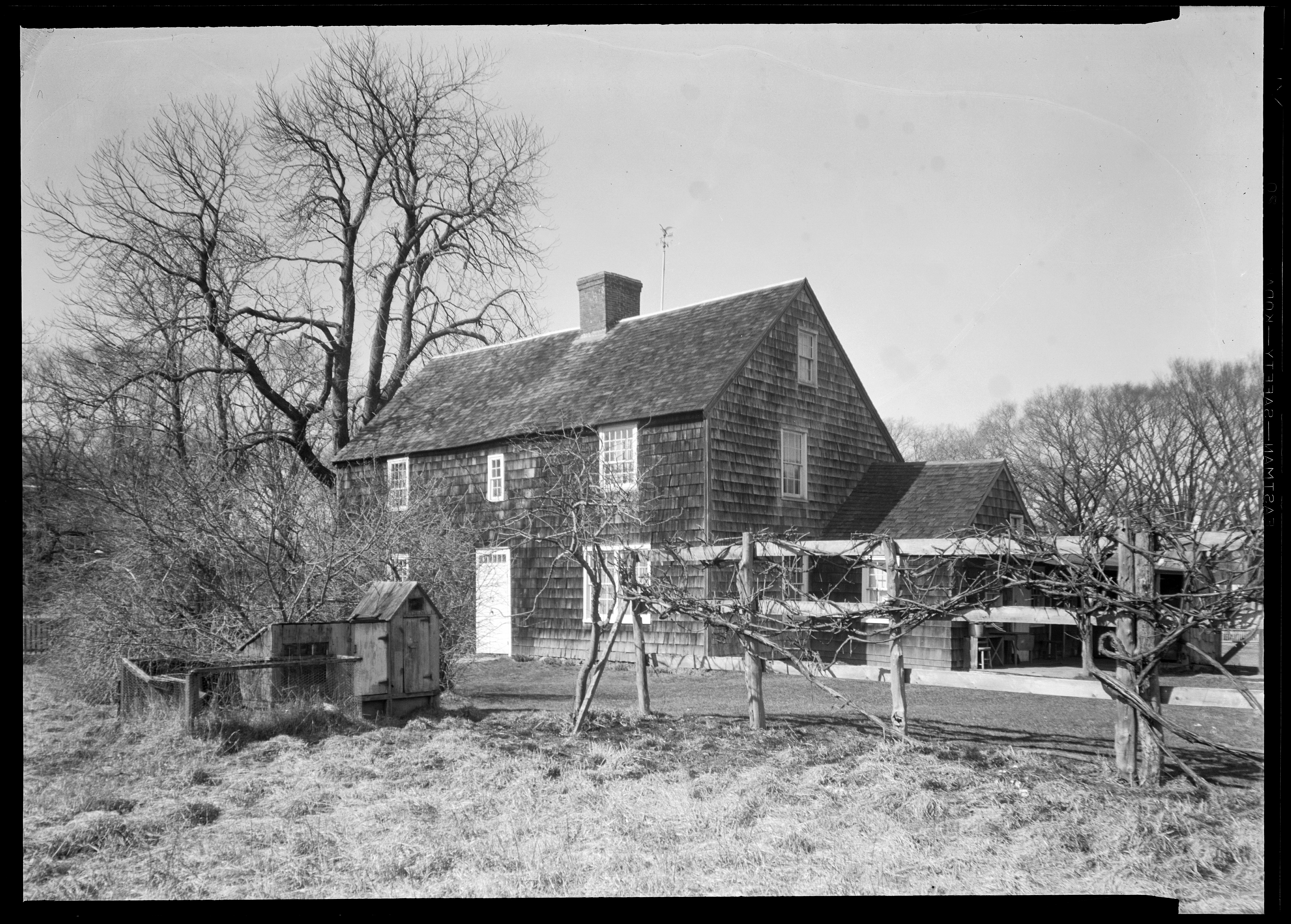
- HABS image of the Mulford Farmhouse

- Location within New York Location within the United States
- Interactive map showing the location of Mulford Farmhouse
- Location: Mulford Farmhouse, East Hampton, New York
- Coordinates: 40.9566°N 72.1911°W
- Area: 2 acres (0.81 ha)
- Built: 1680
- Architect: Josiah Hobart, builder/owner
- Architectural style: English Colonial
- Part of: East Hampton Village District
- NRHP reference No.: 74001309
- Designated CP: May 2, 1974

Mulford Farm in East Hampton, Long Island, New York, is one of America's most significant, intact English colonial farmsteads. The farmhouse was built in 1680 by High Sheriff Josiah Hobart, an important early official of the first New York Royal Province government. Samuel "Fish Hook" Mulford bought the property in 1712 after Hobart's death. He had the barn built in 1721. The property is listed as a contributing property of the East Hampton Village District, a historic district listed on the National Register of Historic Places.

The Mulford Farm site has been interpreted as the year 1790, and includes the house, barn, spinning dependency, privy, smokehouse and garden. It is owned by the East Hampton Historical Society and operated as a living museum. Next to it is a colonial house museum, called "Home Sweet Home" for its association with songwriter John Howard Payne, who spent time as a child there at what was his grandfather's house. The Pantigo windmill is located behind it.

The Mulford Farm museum is located at 10 James Lane, East Hampton, New York, accessible by Montauk Highway. It is open from Memorial Day weekend through Columbus Day weekend.

In 1923, a replica of Payne's childhood house was built as a demonstration home in Washington, D.C. to commemorate the Better Homes Movement.

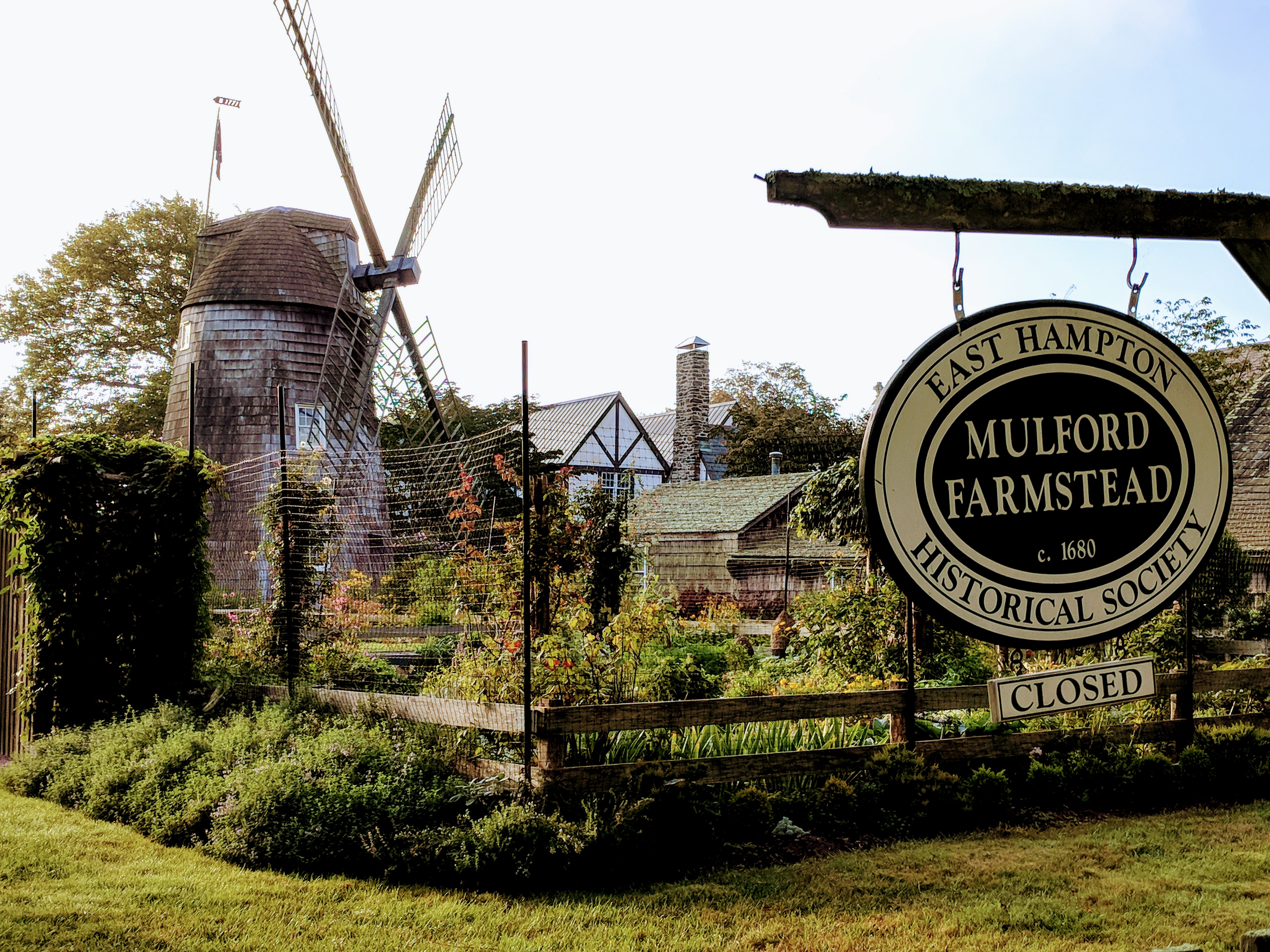
Farmstead sign

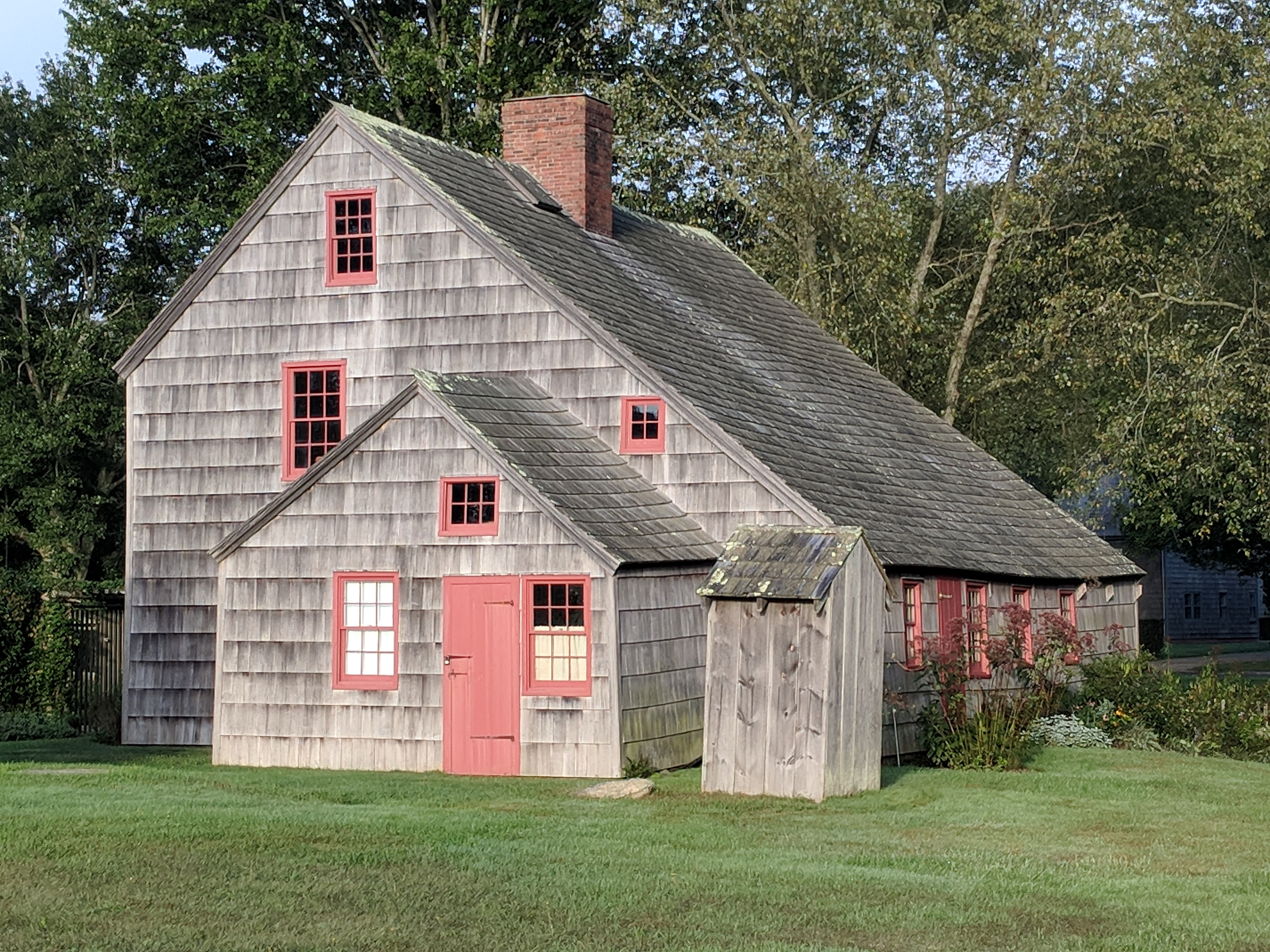

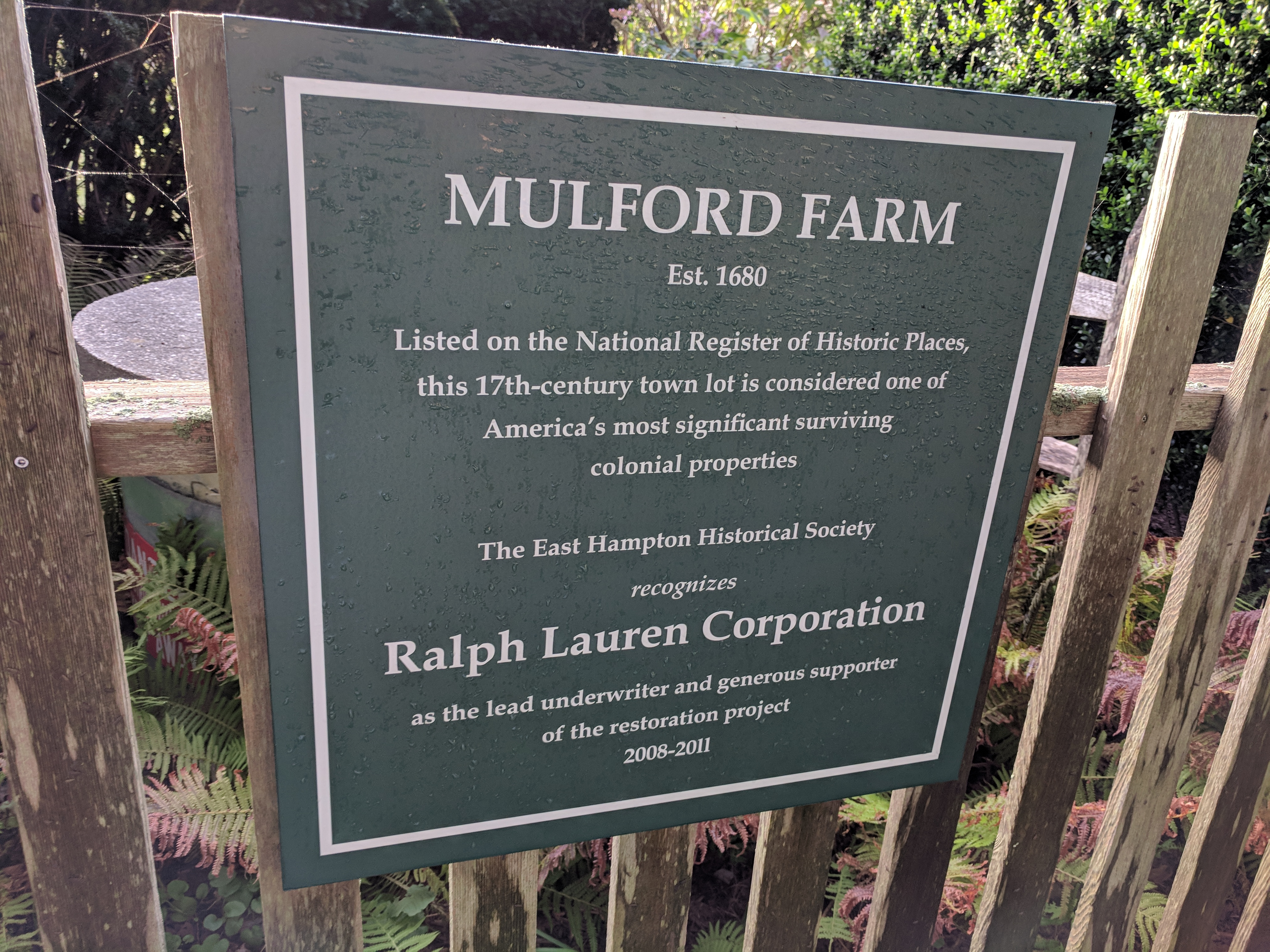
Mulford Farm in East Hampton

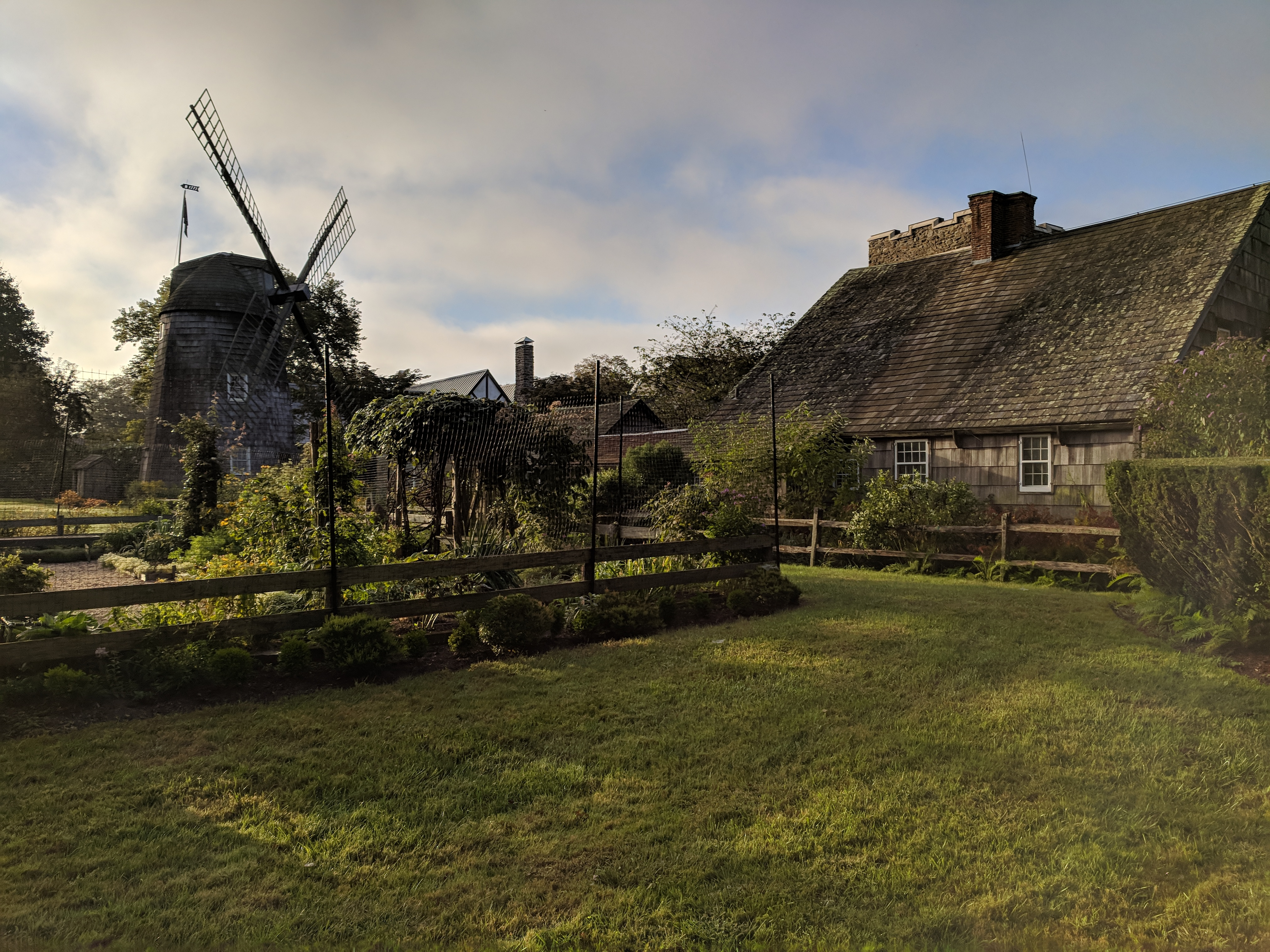
English colonial farmsteads; the Pantigo Windmill abuts the farm.

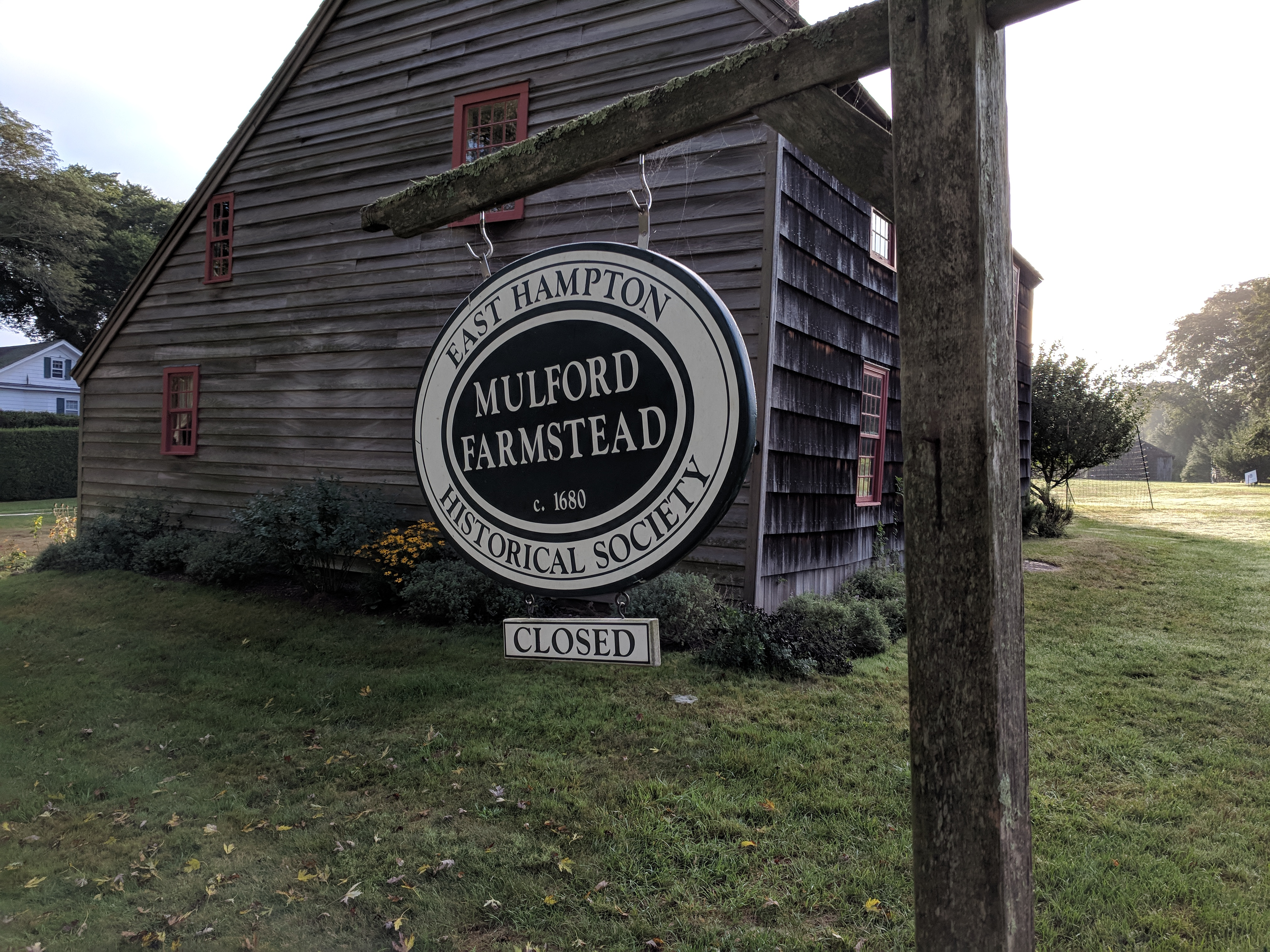
Mulford Farm colonial farmsteads.

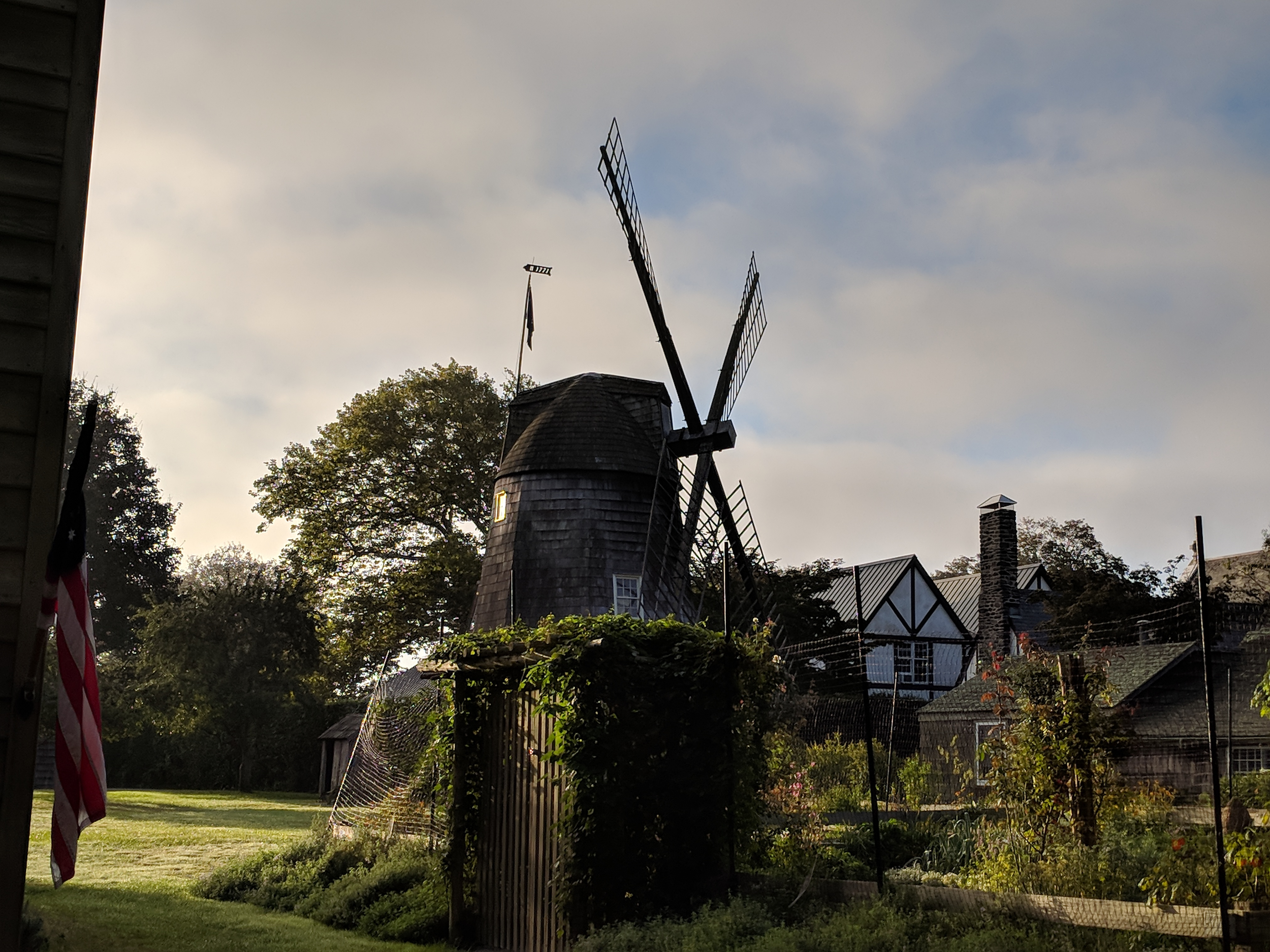
Farm in East Hampton, Long Island

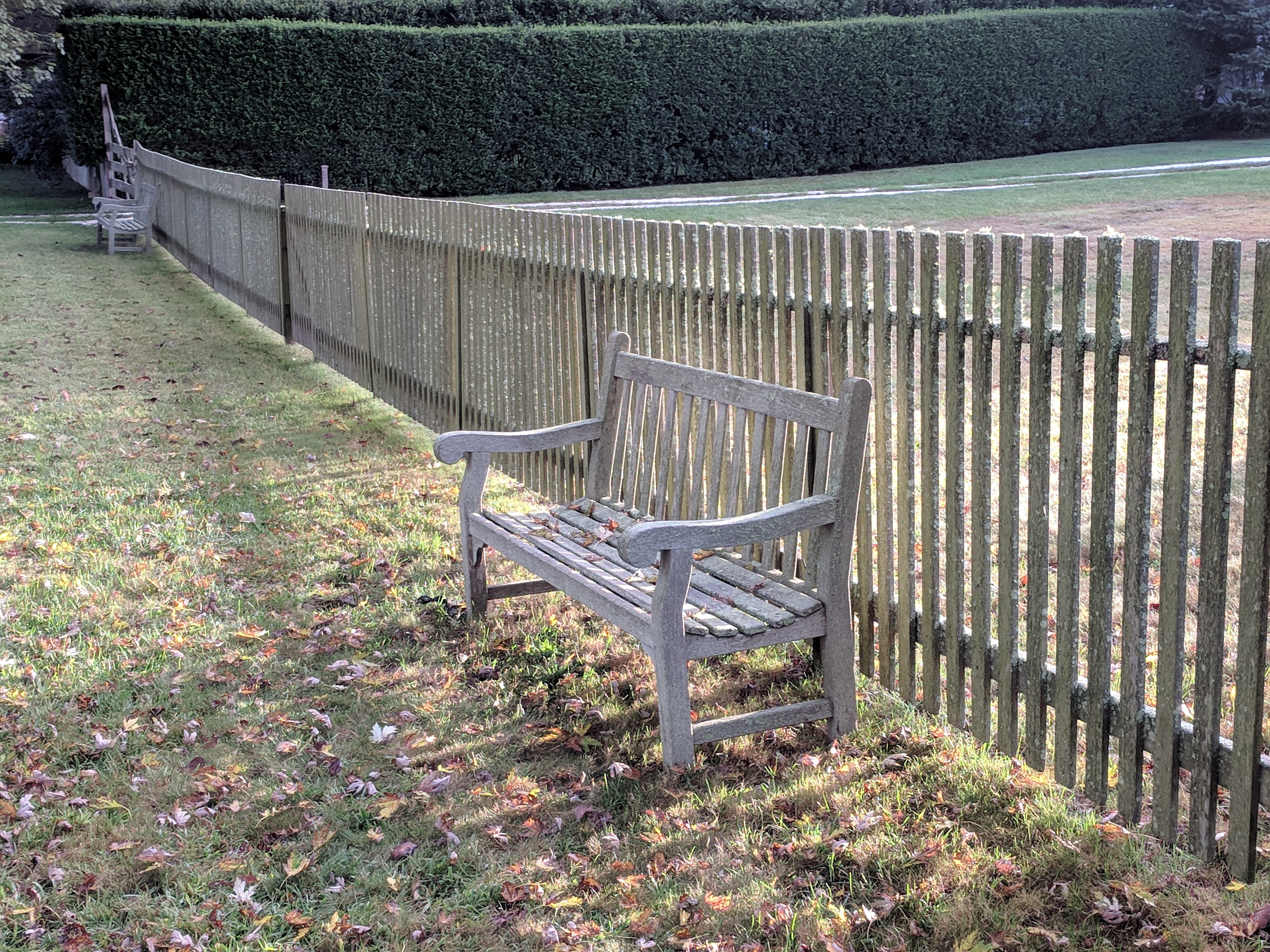
Seats outside Mulford Farm

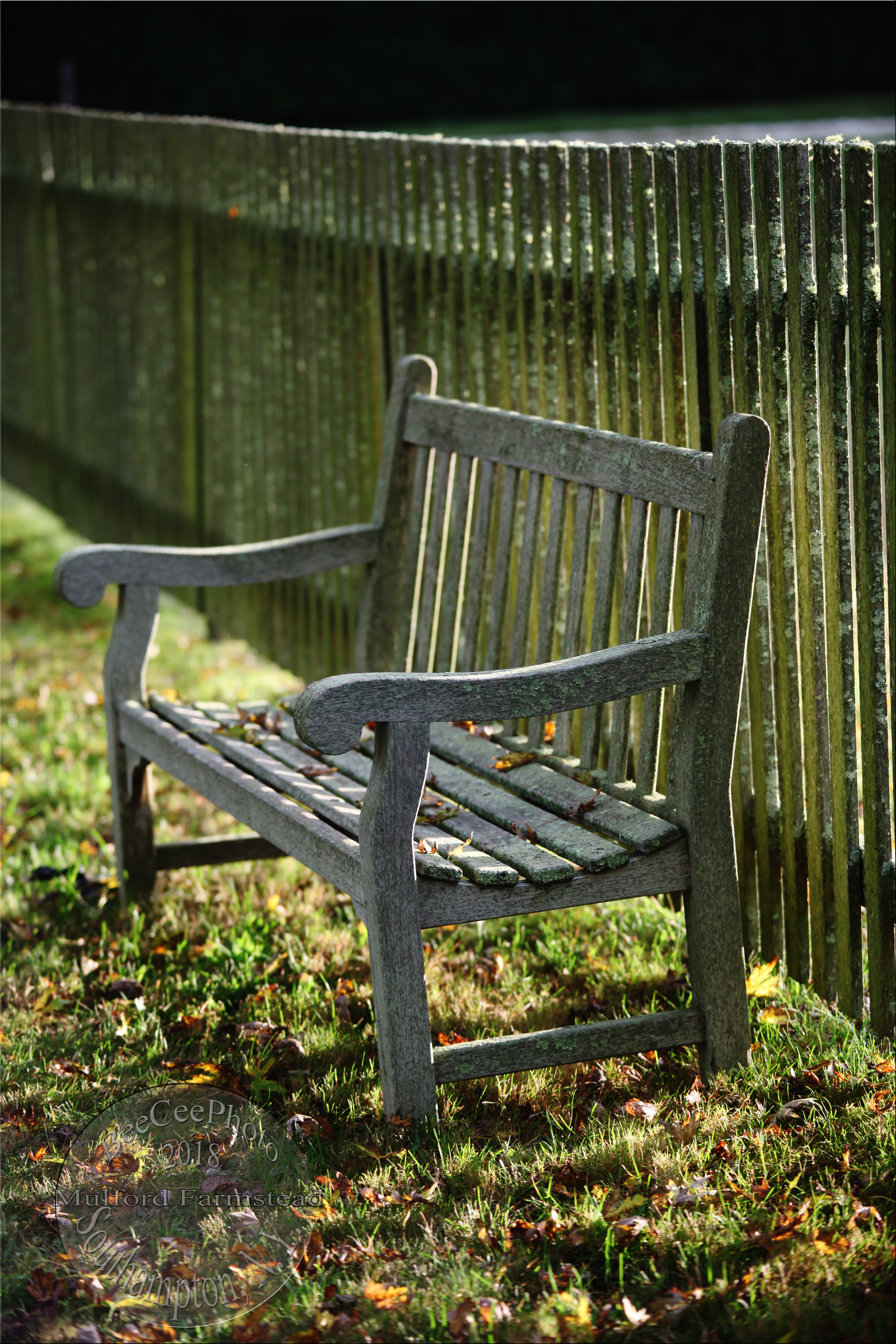
James Street is lined with an arbor of trees and contemplation benches.

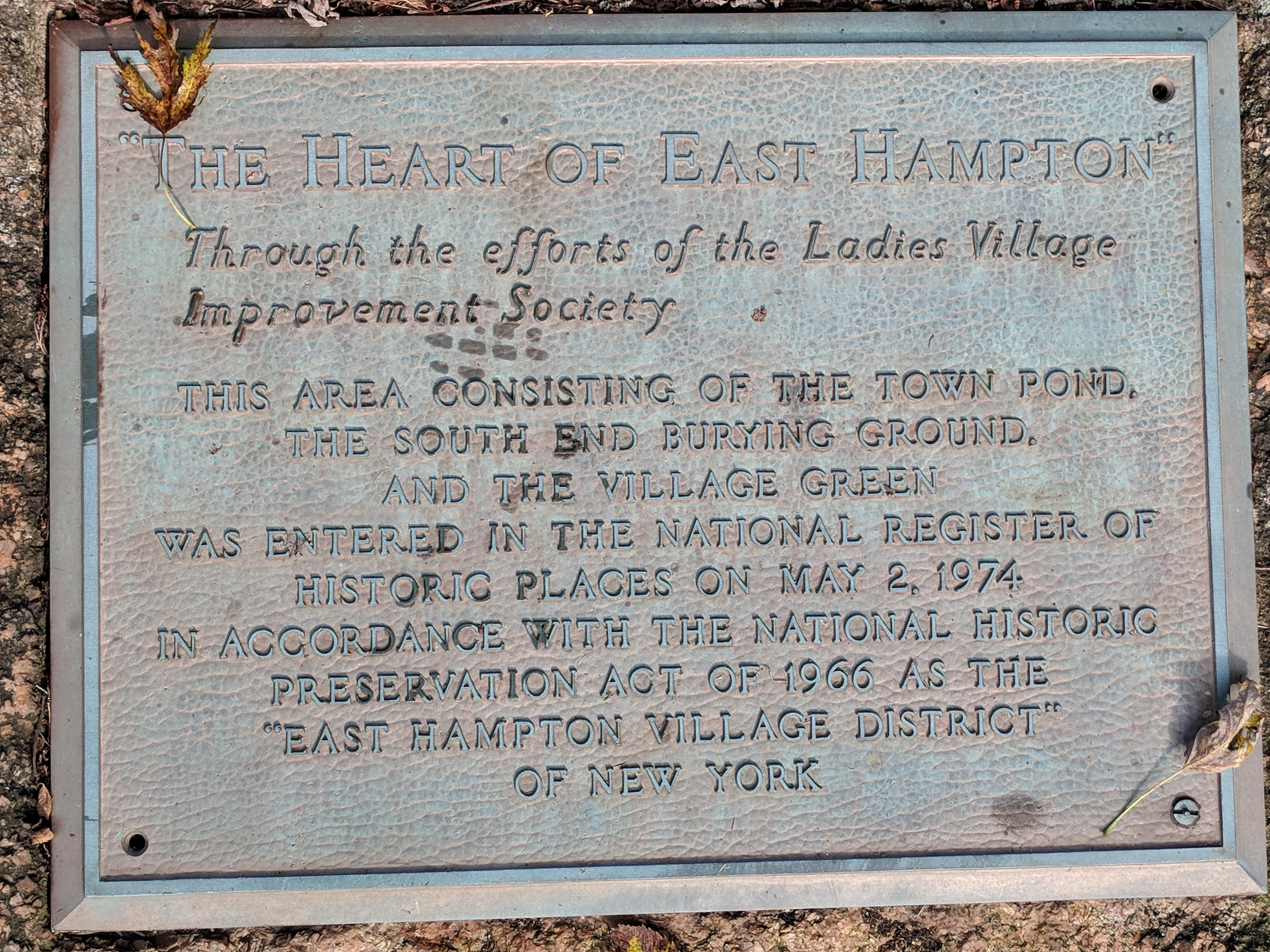
Mulford Farm is a contributing property to the East Hampton Village District, which is on the NRHP

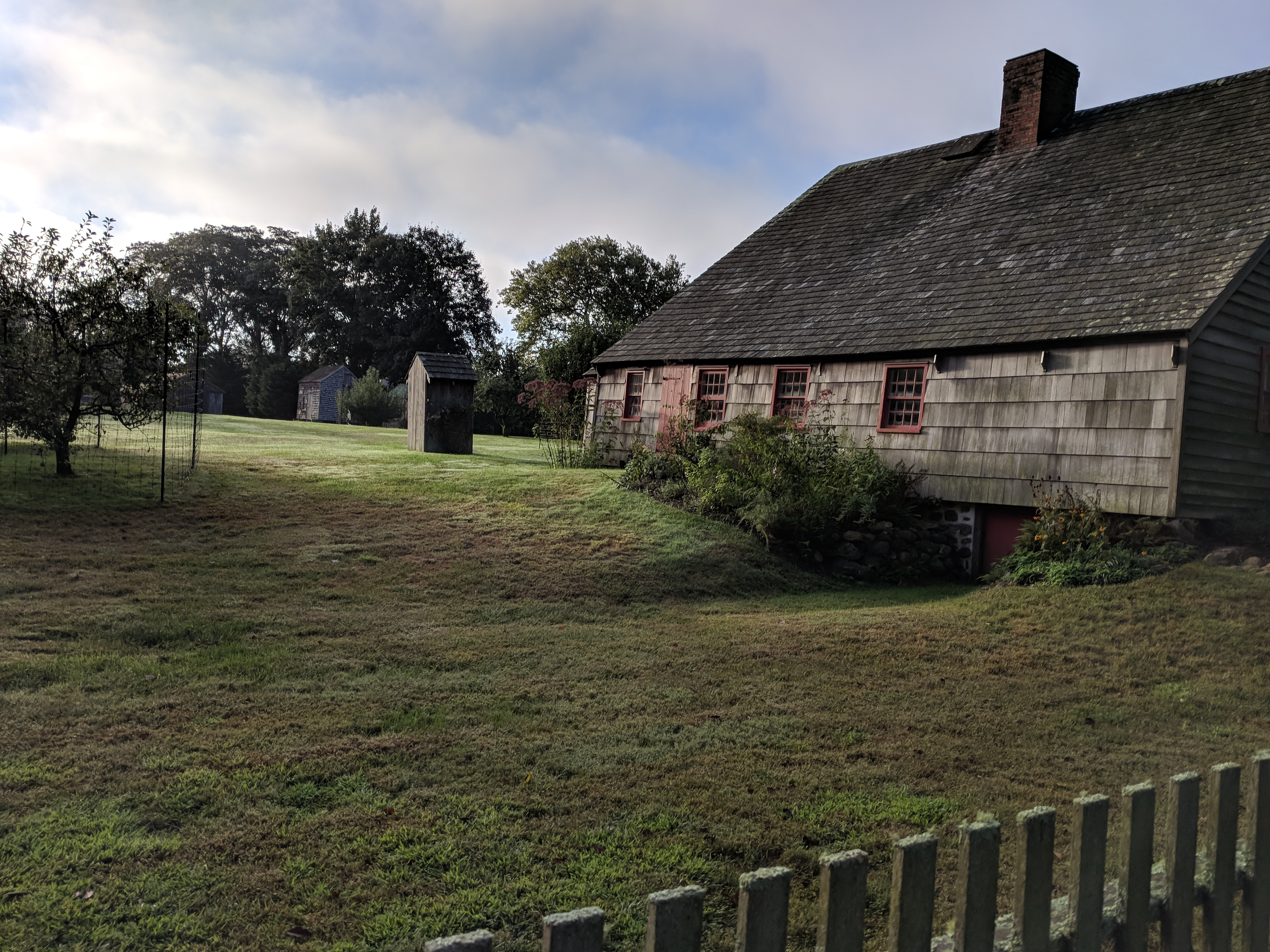
Mulford Farm privy is in center/left

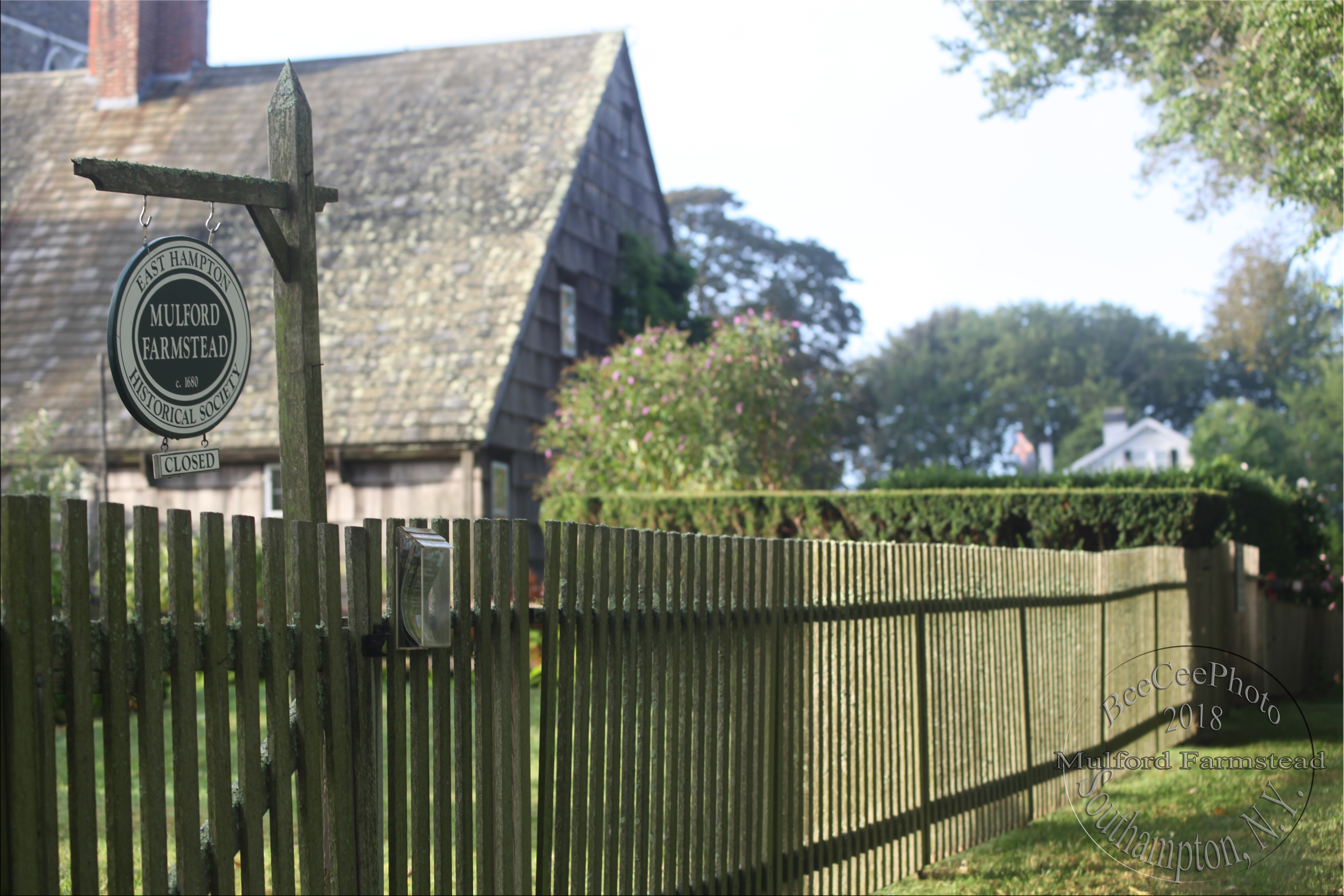
Home Sweet Home Museum, associated with writer John Howard Payne and his song
