= Hook Windmill =

- U.S. National Register of Historic Places
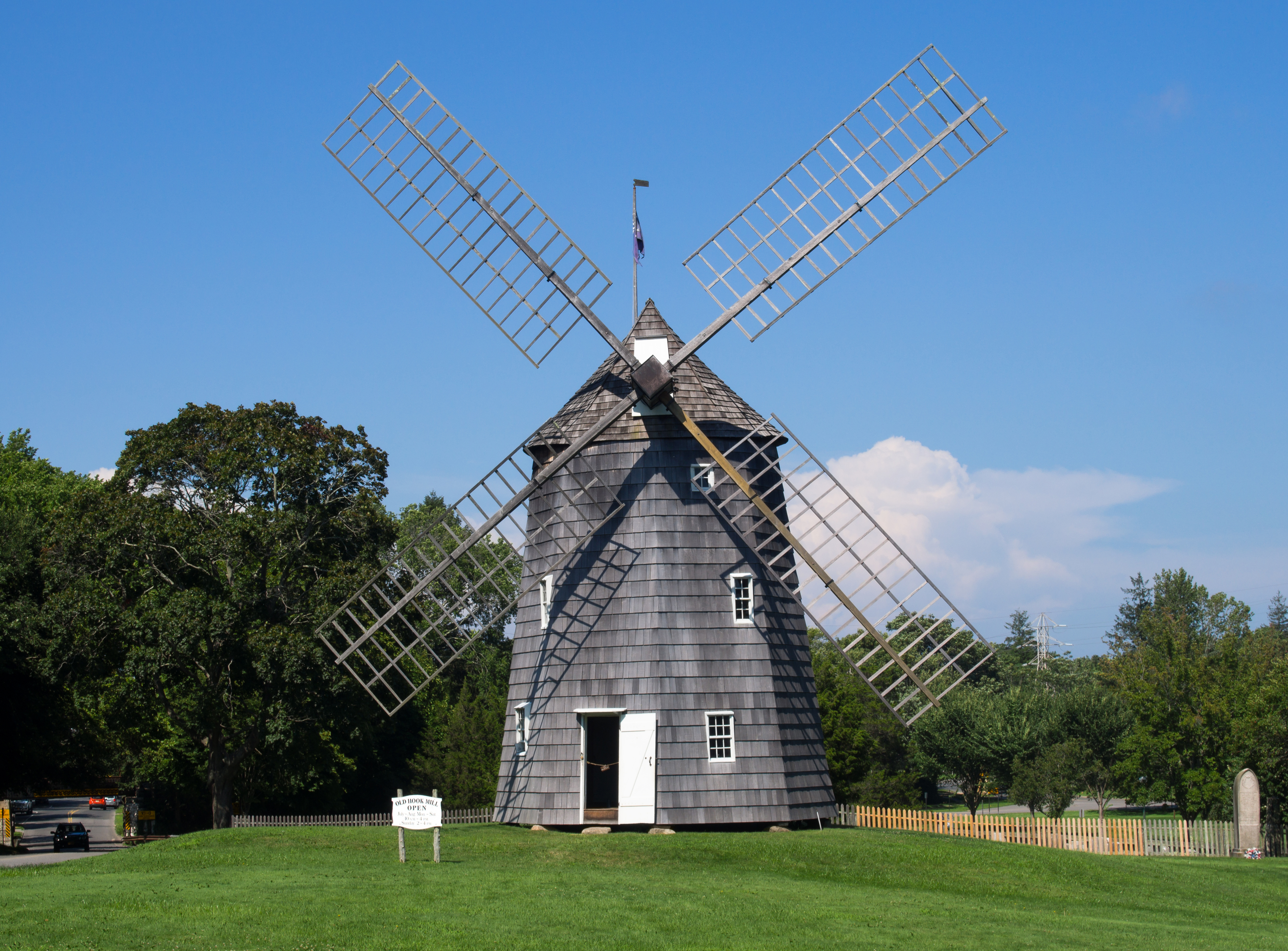
- Hook Windmill in 2016

- Location within New York Location within the United States
- Location: North Main Street; East Hampton, New York
- Coordinates: 40°57′56″N 72°11′2″W
- Built: 1806
- Architect: Nathaniel Dominy
- MPS: Long Island Wind and Tide Mills TR
- NRHP reference No.: 78001914
- Added to NRHP: December 27, 1978

Hook Windmill, also known as Old Hook Mill, is a historic windmill on North Main Street in East Hampton, New York. It was built in 1806 and operated regularly until 1908. One of the most complete of the existing windmills on Long Island, the windmill was sold to the town of East Hampton in 1922. The building was listed on the National Register of Historic Places in 1978 and is part of the North Main Street Historic District. The mill was renamed the "Old Hook Mill" and is open daily to visitors.

== Smock Mill ==
The Windmill is among the 11 other surviving 18th and early 19th-century wind-powered gristmills located on Long Island. It was built by Nathaniel Dominy V, a well-known East Hampton craftsman.

The 'Smock' is a reference to a common farmers garment that lent its appearance to Dutch-style windmills.

== History ==
Hook Windmill, North Main Street at Pantigo Road, East Hampton, Suffolk County, NY HAER NY,52-HAMTE,2- (sheet 6 of 6)

Nathaniel Dominy V and his apprentices built the Hook Windmill in 1806, replacing an earlier "spider-legged" windmill from around 1740 at the same location. Dominy V was a local craftsman who also constructed windmills on Gardiner Island in 1795 and Shelter Island in 1810. The Hook Windmill appears to have incorporated parts from the earlier post-style windmill, including the 24-inch square center post, which was the largest seen in surviving windmills on Long Island and had mortises cut for the tenons of the former quarter bar of the original post mill. Routine maintenance by Dominy V include the replacement of the windshaft in 1816, 1825 and 1830, along with sails, points, cogs and rounds, and replacing bearings.

The Hook Windmill was operated by Nathaniel Dominy VII and his sons from 1859 until 1908 During this time, it was listed as grinding about 5,000 bushels of grain into flour and feed, which was lower than the modern steam-powered grist mill built in Southampton in 1851 that could grind 25,000 bushels of grain. Hook was also equipped with a corn cob crusher and an elevator to transport grain from the first floor to the third floor for processing. Charles Dominy, the son of Nathaniel Dominy VII, restored the windmill for the village to working order in 1939 and ran it until 1942. The mill was then operated by Maurice Lester until the 1950s.

The windmill has been open as a museum in the summer.

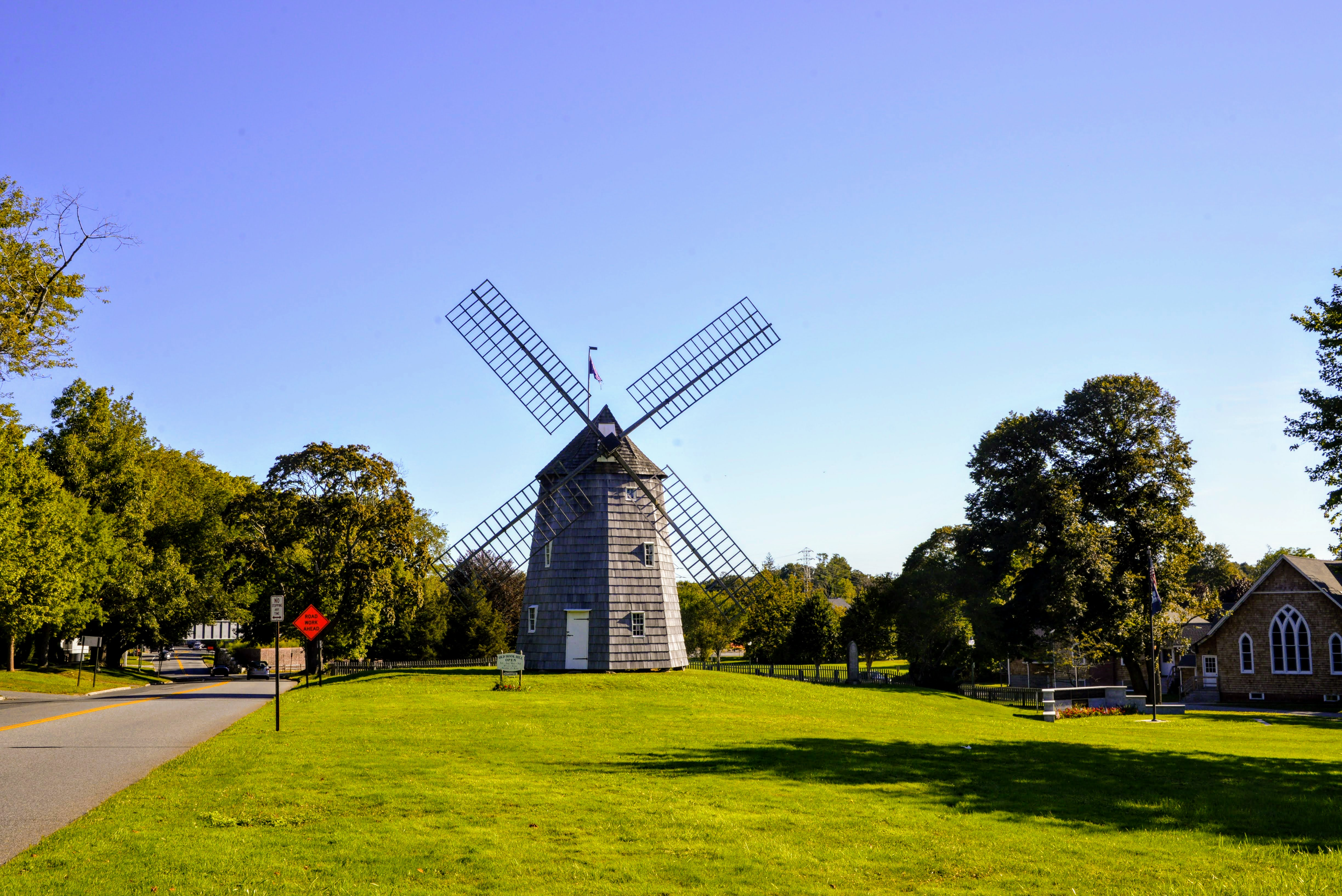
Hook Mill BEE6803

== See also ==
- Good Ground Windmill
- List of windmills in New York
