= List of windmills in New York =

This is a list of windmills in the American state of New York.

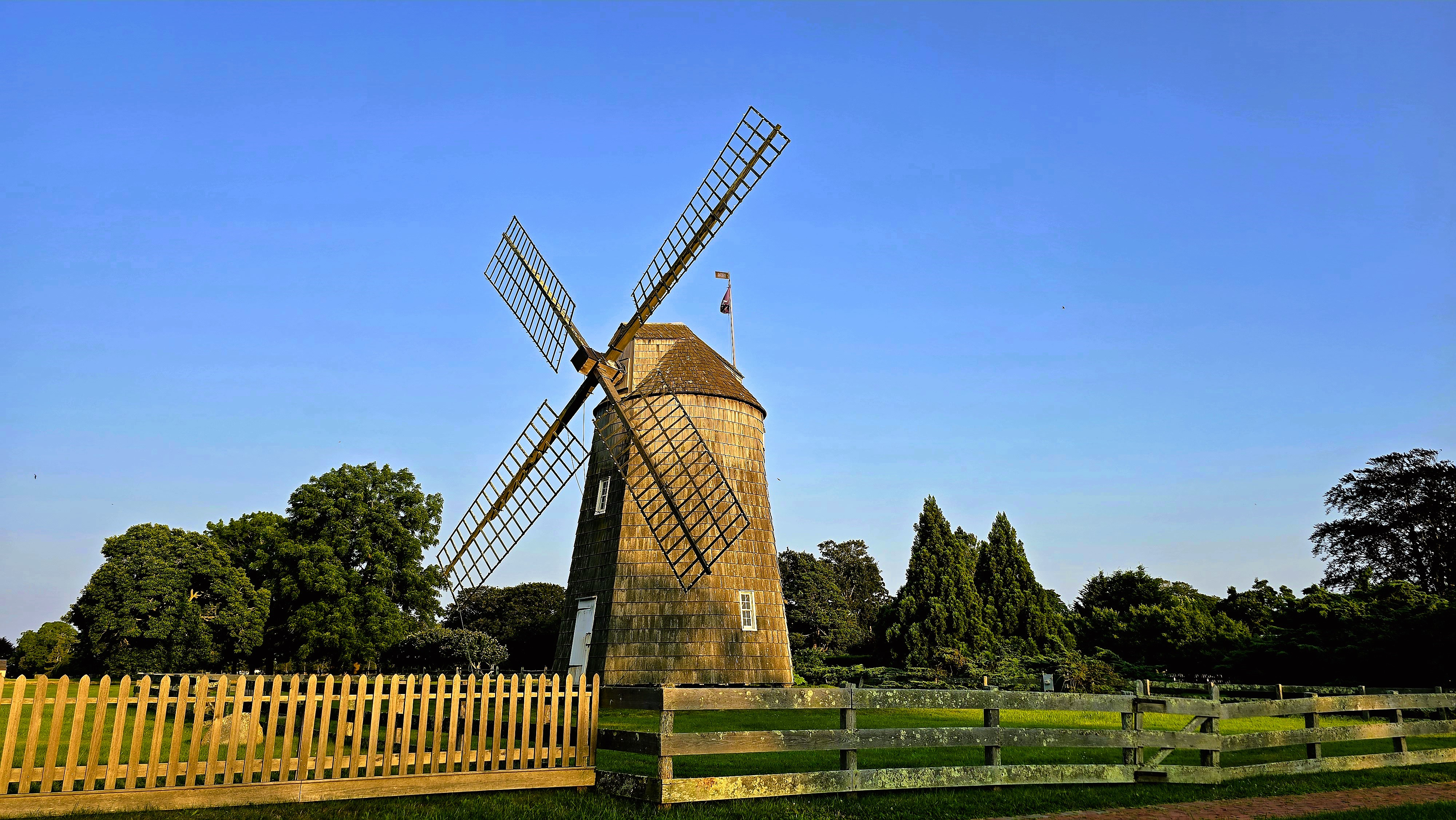
Gardiner Windmill, James Ln., East Hampton Village Green

== Windmills ==
Known building dates are in bold text. Non-bold text denotes first known date. Iron windpumps are on this list and noted if listed on the National Register of Historic Places.

Locations whose coordinates are included below may be seen together in "Map all coordinates using OpenSourceMap" at right side of this page.

Windmill	Location	Type	Built	Notes	Photograph
Hayground Windmill	Amagansett; 40.95514°N 72.16551°W	Smock	**1815**	Moved within Amagansett 1829.	
Amagansett Mill Company	Amagansett	Smock	**1814**	Burnt down 1924.	
Aquebogue Windmill replica	Aquebogue, New York; 40.945028°N 72.628194°W	Smock	**2008**	The plans for the original Pantigo windmill were used to recreate a working copy. Another rebuild in 2021 replaced the whips after they were caught on a Mulberry tree.	
Quail Hill Farms Cottage Mill	Amagansett; 40°59′10.1″N 72°08′13.1″W	Smock	**1810**	Cottage with mill workings removed - New England style smock windmill built into Marilyn Monroe’s/Arthur Miller's Amagansett cottage hideaway, Built in the 1820s, it was converted into a cottage in 1950 by Samuel Rubin, Fabergé perfume mogul. Other famous tenants include Ralph Lauren, Terence Stamp and Kurt Vonnegut. Also known as Deep Lane cottage.	
Amagansett Mill Reform Inn Replica	Amagansett; 40°58′27.9″N 72°08′40.4″W	Smock	**1925**	Mock mill, copy of Amagansett mill which burned the year before.	
Vanderveer Windmill Farm Mill	Vlacke Bos; 40°38′36.1″N 73°57′07.1″W	Tower	**1805**	Destroyed by fire March 4, 1879. 28 ft tall- Stone foundation 3', with beams 28'x2.5' remained in place on Flatbush farm for 75 years, built by John C. Vanderveer to grind grist, the sails were blown off in 1821 and again in 1831 and were not replaced. Used to store grain afterwards, was full of hay when it burnt down.	
West Babylon Windmill replica	West Babylon, Long Island, NY. 40°42′15.5″N 73°20′40.3″W	Smock	**1984**	Village green replica. West Babylon was originally a horticultural farm for tulips, the windmill at Route 109 and Little East Neck rd is a contributing property on the NRHP for the Little East Neck Historic District.	
Bulk's Garden Center Windmill	West Babylon, Long Island, NY.	Smock	**1929**	Demolished in 1983.	1930s picture of Bulk's Windmill 1955 picture
Conover Mill	Bay Shore	Smock	**1880**		
Dix Windmill	Westhampton Beach 40°48'26.1"N 72°38'44.3"W	Smock	**1870**	Built into a summer mansion for pumping water (residential), moved to great lawn 2023	
Beebe Mill	Bridgehampton	Smock	1830s	Moved within Bridgehampton 1889	
Beebe Mill	Bridgehampton; 40°56′03″N 72°18′05″W	Smock	**1915**	HAER NY-67	
Sag Harbor Visitor Center Windmill replica	Sag Harbor; 41°00′10.1″N 72°17′45.7″W	Smock	**1966**	The Sag Harbor Convention and Visiters Center is a replica of the Beebe Mill, on Long Wharf at 1 Ferry Rd. The spot is 50' east the site of the original mill on Long Wharf.	Long Wharf- Sag Harbor visitors center 20201003
Edwin DeRose Windmill Cottage	East Hampton; 40°57′49.2″N 72°11′32.1″W	Smock	**1926**	Replica of a smock mill built into a large cottage.	
Gardiners Island Mill	East Hampton	Smock	**1771**	Moved on Gardiner's Island 23 May 1795. Gardiner wrote in his Journal & Farm Book that his old gristmill which he called the "Petticoat" was "crazy & gone to Decay: very little care taken of her in the war from 1775 to 1782. He was 25 in 1795.	
Gardiners Island Mill	East Hampton; 41°05′28″N 72°06′40″W	Smock	**1795**	(HAER) No. NY-125- When finished in 1795, the mill was painted white to serve as a navigational landmark for the nearby wharf. It was refurbished in 1816 by N.Dominy V and crew. Further repairs were done by V in 1828 and 1833. The windmill was last used and repaired in 1889	
John Lyon Gardiner Mill	East Hampton; 40.95501°N 72.19214°W	Smock	**1804**	Still at original loc opposite Lyon Gardiners grave and village pond on James Lane. Saltbox cottage was rebuilt 2015.	
Hayground Mill	Haye Ground		**1801**	171 Hayground Road, Bridgehampton, NY 11932. Moved within East Hampton to Pantigo beach estate 1950.	
Hayground Mill	East Hampton; 40°57′18.6″N 72°09′55.8″W		**1950**	Moved to the dunes Windmill Ln	
Odd Fellows Windmill	Hollis, Queens; 40°42′17.3″N 73°45′44.2″W	Tower mill	**1892**	194th St, Hollis, NY 11912. Built to fill two holding tank for plumbing at the Odd Fellows Aged home and later orphanage. Removed from service 1959, demolished 2004	
Hook Mill	East Hampton; 40°57′56″N 72°11′02″W	Smock	**1806**	Fully restored mill by Nathaniel Dominy V	
Wainscott Mill	East Hampton; 40°56′01″N 72°14′16″W	Smock	**1940**	HAER NY-144	
Hunting Miller's Mill -(Pantigo) Mill hill site of prev 1771 mill	East Hampton	Smock	**Built 1804**	Moved within East Hampton, 1850,1917. Originally Southampton Mill Hill II.	
Schellinger Mill-'Pantigo' moved to Pantigo and Egypt Ln	East Hampton	Smock	**1850**	Moved within East Hampton 1850,1917.	
Mulford Farm Mill (Pantigo) moved fm Pantigo rd to Mulford	East Hampton	Smock	**1917**	Mulford Homestead museum 1771 weathervane	
Pantigo Mill	East Hampton; 40°57′24.0″N 72°11′26.7″W	Smock	**1804**	Pantigo Windmill - 1771 weathervane	
Southold Mills	Glen Island	Smock	**1810**	Orient mill VI. by Dominy V. Moved by J. Starin in 1898 to his theme park, off New Rochelle, burned down a year later	Promotional card for Starin's Glen Island.
Good Ground Mill	Hampton Bays	Smock	1807	This smock windmill, built by Dominy V. in 1807 on Shelter Island, served the island until it was moved to Good Ground in the 1860s. From the 1860s until 1880 the mill was in operation at Good Ground. In 1880, the Good Ground Windmill was moved to the village of Southampton and built into a seaside cottage.	
Peconic Windmill	Southold; 41°03′16.7″N 72°28′28.5″W	Smock	**1840** the Goldsmith Inlet Grist Mill was built as a tidal mill at the inlet on the North Fork of Long Island, New York	Windmill added 1870, 1898 Blizzard destroyed the windmill, the water mill operated for 5 more years, then abandoned. Razed 1906	
Hofstra Mill	Hempstead	Smock	**1903**		
Hempstead Mill	Hempstead	Smock	**1860**		
Mineola Mill	Hempstead	Smock	**1860**		
Hewlett Mill	Hewlett	Smock	**1791**		
Sammis Mill	Huntington	Vertical axle mill	**1825**		
Norman Levy Park windmill	Freeport; 40°38′52.3″N 73°33′47.6″W	Spider legged Windmill	**2000**	The windmill is atop a former landfill, it is used by 2 man-made ponds to provide circulation of fresh-water for a wildlife habitat.	
Arthur W. B. Wood House & Mill Replica	Montauk; 41°03′17.8″N 71°56′31.1″W	Smock	**1928**	The windmill is a replica built by Architect A.W.B. Wood along with the house. The house structure incorporates a three-story windmill which is decorative only. It is the only windmill house in Montauk.	
Bowerie Windmill(City Hall Park)	Nieuw Amsterdam; 40°42′43.5276″N 74°0′27.9972″W	Pole Mill	**1663** Buyten de Landtpoort (lit. 'Beyond the Land Gate'). Marker was in New York City, New York, in New York County. Marker was at the intersection of Broadway and Barclay Street, on the left when traveling south on Broadway. Marker was on the fence at the southern end of City Hall Park	The windmill in City Hall Park was built by carpenters in 1663-64 and replaced an earlier one that was first erected before 1628 along the Beaver's Path at the tip of Manhattan. This windmill was located on the "common lands" outside the city limits and continued to grind flour after the English took control of Nieuw Amsterdam from the Dutch in 1664.	
Beaver Trail Windmill(City Hall Park)	Nieuw Amsterdam; 40°42′13.1″N 74°0′56.2″W	Pole Mill	**1628** Public Mill. Fort George was in Neiuw Amsterdam.	The windmill was first erected before 1628 next to the fort at the tip of Manhattan.	
(two mills)	Morris Island				
McConnell's Mill; Stone Mill	Morristown; 44°35′22″N 75°38′42″W	Stone	**1825**	It is the only windmill on the American side of the St. Lawrence Valley. NRHP	
Gladden Mill	Napoli; 42°14′07″N 78°53′44″W		**1890**	a vertical wind turbine built during the 19th century. NRHP listed in 1973, the windmill has been dismantled and moved to Conewango, New York.	
Bourne Windmill	Oakdale	Tower	**1911**	An American farm design tower windmill, demolished 2004-2005	
Orient windmills	Orient	Smock	**1810**	Moved to Glen Island 1898. See article for details	Orient Point Windmill
Sagamore Hill windpump windmill	Sagamore Hill, Oyster Bay; 40°53′08.2″N 73°30′01.2″W	Spider legged Windmill	**1905**	The windmill is a replica of 2 prior windmills Theodore Roosevelt had installed. The 1st was built when the house was constructed in 1881. A 2nd windmill, and a supplemental gasoline powered pump, replaced it in 1905. The mills were utilized to pump fresh water from the well, and the water was sent to a storage tank and to a hot water heater in the house. Despite being in a rural location, Sagamore Hill had the same facilities as most city houses, including a porcelain tub next to the main hall. Contributing property NRHP	
Remsenburg Academy windmill	Eastport; 40°48′31.6″N 72°42′21.4″W	Spider legged Windmill	**1925**	The Spider legged Windmill is on an adjacent property, legs are covered.	
Remsenburg lodge windmill	Eastport; 40°48′31.4″N 72°43′19.2″W	Smock	**1825**	The windmill was converted into a laundry room for the salt water pool next to it.	
Beebe Mill	Sag Harbor	Smock	**1820**	Moved to Bridgehampton 1830s, originally on the wharf, moved to Sherrill's hill on Suffolk street in Sag Harbor, it was the high point to signal when whaling ships were spotted, a flag was then displayed and the residents began converging on the wharf, it was moved 4 more times towards Bridgehampton, ending up on Ocean Lane. Considered the Queen of the Hamptons, Beebe sits on two acres in Bridgehampton.	
Shelter Island Mill	Shelter Island; 41°04′33″N 72°20′08″W		**1810**	windmill built 1810 at Southold by Nathaniel Dominy V. He used parts from a previous mill. Moved to Shelter Island by barge.	
Good Ground Mill	Shelter Island	Smock	**1807**	Moved to Hampton Bays 1860	
Sylvester's Mill	Shelter Island	Smock	**1839**	(HAER) No. NY-145 Moved in 1926 by Miss Cornelia Horsford to the grounds of Sylvester Manor.	
Pole	Southampton	replaced by Mill Hill I		Burnt down prior to 1813	
	Southampton	Smock	**1813**	Mill Hill II, Moved to Wainscott 1840.	
Good Ground Mill	Southampton	Smock	**1890**	The Good Ground Gristmill in Hampton Bays is a historic gristmill that was located on the corner of Montauk Highway and Ponquogue Avenue. Built on Shelter Island, New York in 1807, it was moved by barge to Good Ground in 1860.	
Windmill Lane Mill I	Southampton	Smock	**1712**	Moved from Mill Hill, to site next to Shinnecock GC Southampton 1890.	
Mill Hill Mill I, Southampton College	Southampton	Smock	**1890**	Arthur Brigham Claflin, a textile magnate, bought the mill from Mrs Hoyt, where it became a playroom for his daughter. She died after a fall in the mill and it's claimed she haunts it still.	
Shinnecock Hills Mill	Southampton; 40°53′17.2″N 72°26′44.0″W	Smock	**1814**	Mill Hill Mill I was part of the Claflin Estate, after WWII the estate was sold and the windmill cottage became the Tucker Mill Inn resort.	
National Links Mill	Southampton; 40°54′43.0″N 72°27′03.5″W	Smock	**1916**	Mill moved from Europe to National Golf Links between the 2nd & 16th holes. Installed by C.B. McDonald and billed to Daniel E. Pomeroy for complaining about an errant ball in a water barrel, and for suggesting a better use of the spot would be a windmill.	
Mill Hill I	Southold	Smock	**1810**	Moved to Shelter Island 1839.	
Mill Hill II	Southold	Smock	**1806**	Built at Brooklyn Hgts, moved to Paulus Hook, NJ 1812. moved to Southold 1839.	Rutgers-lib-17777 JPEG-1-810x505
Butler Windmill	St. James	Tower	**1894**	150 foot high tower, the Andrew J. Corcoran-designed spider legged windpump was built to be the strongest and highest in the world, the water was pumped to a reservoir a mile away to Prescott Hall Butler's estate. A.J.Corcoran Co. built windmills (See Bourne Windmill) and Butler was a NY Attourney. The Butler windpump brand added improvements to the technology of windpumps in 1897, 1898 and 1905	
Corwith Mill - Built at Hog Neck 1799	Sag Harbor	Smock	**1800**	Moved to Water Mill 1814.	
Corwith Mill	Water Mill	Smock	**1814**	Moved to Water Mill 1814	
Water Mill Windmill	Water Mill; 40°54′34″N 72°21′15″W		**1800**	Moved to Water Mill 1814 triangle at Villa Maria	
Wainscott Mill	Wainscott	Smock	**1840**	Built 1813 on Mill hill to replace mill burnt the prior year, (became Mill Hill II), 1841 purchased and moved next to Mill Hill I by owner Barney Green, who owned I & II, 1858 moved to Wainscott by Cornelius Conklin where it remained for 50 yrs, changed owners 2x, 1912 became the Wainscott Public Library. Lathrop Brown purchased the mill in 1922 and moved it to Montauk just west of the Lighthouse where it merged into a cottage, the US Gov't took it in 1942 and Brown gave it to the Georgica Beach Assoc., They moved it to Georgica Pond in the 1940s.	

== List by date built and moved ==
By date constructed

1. Beaver Trail Windmill (City Hall Park), Nieuw Amsterdam (1628): One of the earliest windmills in the region, the Beaver Trail Windmill in Nieuw Amsterdam dates back to 1628, a testament to the early Dutch influence on Long Island. Next to Fort Amsterdam.
2. Bowerie Windmill, Nieuw Amsterdam (1663): Erected in 1663, the Bowerie Windmill was on the farm of Gov Peter Stuyvesant in Nieuw Amsterdam, (today's Bowery St.) The trail led outside the ‘Wall’ past farmland. When the English took NY from the Dutch, they decided to let the then 2 yr old windmill continue operating.
3. Windmill Lane Mill I, Southampton (1713) - Shinnecock Hills Windmill (1890): Originally constructed in 1713, Windmill Lane Mill I was relocated to Shinnecock Hills in 1890, then moved to the current location where it was converted into a cottage by Textile magnate A.B.Clafin. The cottage was later renovates in the 1950's by the then owners of the Tucker Inn.
4. Gardiner’s Island Mill I, East Hampton (1771): Dating back to 1771, Gardiner’s Island Mill I in East Hampton was a ‘Petticoat’ Mill’ that had fallen into dis-repair during the revolutionary war and was replaced with the present windmill.
5. Hewlett Mill, Hewlett (1791): The Hewlett Mill, established in 1791, played a crucial role in the local milling industry, contributing to the economic development of Hewlett.
6. Gardiners Island Windmill, East Hampton (1795): Built in 1795, the Gardiners Island Windmill in East Hampton stands as a symbol of the island's rich history, offering a glimpse into its agricultural past.
7. Corwith Mill, Hog Neck, Sag Harbor (1799) – Water Mill Windmill (1814): Originally built in 1799, the Corwith Mill in Sag Harbor underwent a transformative relocation to Water Mill in 1814, leaving an indelible mark on both locations.
8. Haye G rounde Windmill, Hayground (1810) - Pantigo Beach (1850): With origins dating back to 1810, the Haygrounde Windmill underwent relocation to Pantigo Beach in 1850, showcasing the mobility of these historic structures.
9. John Lyon Gardiner Windmill & Cottage, East Hampton (1804): Constructed in 1804, the John Lyon Gardiner Windmill & Cottage in East Hampton is a charming representation of early 19th-century milling architecture. The cottage was rebuilt in 2021.
10. Huntting Miller’s Mill, East Hampton (1804) - Schellinger Mill (1850) - Pantigo Mill (1850-1917) - Mulford Farm Mill, East Hampton (1917-): The complex history of Huntting Miller’s Mill includes a series of relocations and name changes, culminating in the current Mulford Farm Mill, which has been behind “Home Sweet Home’ since 1917.
11. Vanderveer Windmill Farm Mill, Vlacke Bos (1805): Built in 1805, the Vanderveer Windmill Farm Mill in Vlacke Bos (Flatbush) adds to the agricultural history of Brooklyn. It was later recognized as where blacks took refuge during the ‘Draft Riots” of the Civil War
12. Hook Windmill, East Hampton (1806): Erected in 1806, Hook Windmill in East Hampton stands as an architectural gem, representing the historical significance of windmills in the area. Completely rebuilt, in 2018 20 men aided in getting it up and running.
13. Isaac Edge’s Mill (1806) - Paulus Hook, NJ (1812) - Mill Hill II, Southold (1840): Isaac Edge’s Mill, initially built in 1806, underwent a relocation to Paulus Hook in 1812 before finding its final resting place as Mill Hill II in Southold in 1840.
14. Good Ground Windmill, Shelter Is. (1807) – Good Ground (1860) - Southampton (1880): The Good Ground Windmill, established in 1807, embarked on a journey that included relocation to Good Ground in 1860 and later to Southampton in 1880, becoming a symbol of the ‘Southampton Summer Colony’.
15. Mill Hill I, Southold (1810): Standing tall since 1810, Mill Hill I in Southold played a significant role in the local milling tradition, contributing to the architectural legacy of the area.
16. Southold Mills, Southold (1810)- Glen Island (1898): Dating back to 1810, the Southold Mill was moved to become a part of the summer resort on Glen Island.
17. Red Mill, Southold (1810) - Sylvester’s Mill, Shelter Island (1839): Originally established in 1810 as the Red Mill by Jockey Creek, Orient, it underwent relocation to Shelter Island in 1839, first to the town center, then Sylvester Fiske moved it to his farm where it stands today as Sylvester’s Mill Farm Museum, preserving the island's milling heritage.
18. Quail Hill Farms Cottage Mill, Amagansett (1810): Built in 1810, Quail Hill Farms Cottage Mill in Amagansett is a charming representation of early 19th-century conversion cottage architecture. It was converted into a cottage in 1950 by Samuel Rubin, Fabergé perfume mogul
19. Wainscott Mill, Windmill Lane II, Southampton (1813) – Wainscott (1858) – Montauk (1922) – Georgica Pond (1943 -): Wainscott Mill, initially constructed in 1813, underwent a series of relocations, ultimately settling near Georgica Pond in 1943 after a journey that took it to Montauk in 1922.
20. Beebe Windmill, Sag Harbor (1820) - Bridgehampton (1830) – Bridgehampton Railroad (south 1882, north 1889), Minden, Ocean Lane, Bridgehampton (1915): The Beebe Windmill, established in 1820, witnessed relocations to Bridgehampton in 1830 and later to various locations, including the Bridgehampton Railroad in the late 19th century.
21. McConnell's Mill (Stone Mill), Morristown (1825): Erected in 1825, McConnell's Mill in Morristown is a stone-built windmill, contributing to the architectural diversity of the region.
22. Sammis Mill, Huntington (1825): Built in 1825, Sammis Mill in Huntington is a testament to the milling heritage of the area, standing as an enduring symbol of the past.
23. Amagansett Windmill, Amagansett (1829): The Amagansett Windmill, constructed in 1829, is a picturesque representation of early 19th-century windmill architecture in Amagansett. Burned in 1924.
24. Goldsmith’s Inlet Tidemill (1839) - Peconic Windmill (1870): The Goldsmith’s Inlet Tidemill, dating back to 1839, was later relocated and transformed into the Peconic Windmill in 1870, contributing to the milling history of the region. Razed 1906.
25. Dix Windmill, Westhampton Beach (1870): Erected in 1870, Dix Windmill in Westhampton Beach was a wind pump built to provide indoor plumbing. During rebuilding in 2020 the owners changed plans and donated it to the commons in Westhampton Beach.
26. Conover Mill, Bay Shore (1880): The Conover Mill, established in 1880, is a significant landmark in Bay Shore, representing the late 19th-century milling traditions.
27. Gladden Mill, Napoli (1890): Dating back to 1890, the Gladden Mill in Napoli is a fine example of late 19th-century windmill architecture, contributing to the historical charm of the region.
28. Odd Fellows Windmill, Hollis, Queens (1892): The Odd Fellows Windmill, erected in 1892 in Hollis, Queens, is a unique addition to the local landscape, showcasing the diversity of windmill designs.
29. Butler Windmill, St. James (1894): Standing tall since 1894, the Butler Windmill in St. James is a 150-foot-high structure designed by Andrew J. Corcoran, contributing to advancements in wind pump technology in the late 19th and early 20th centuries.
30. Hofstra Mill, Hempstead (1903): Constructed in 1903, the Hofstra Mill in Hempstead reflects the turn of the century milling architecture, once serving as a historical landmark in the area.
31. Sagamore Hill Windpump Windmill, Oyster Bay (1886, 1905): Originally built in 1886, the Sagamore Hill Windpump Windmill underwent modifications in 1905 by then President, Teddy Roosevelt, becoming a unique representation of wind power in Oyster Bay.
32. Bourne Windmill, Oakdale (1911): Erected in 1911, the Bourne Windmill in Oakdale was a farm tower later demolished (2005)
33. Remsenburg Academy Windmill, Eastport (1925): Dating back to 1925, the Remsenburg Academy Windmill in Eastport is a charming representation of early 20th-century windmill architecture. (spider legged)
34. Remsenburg Lodge Windmill, Eastport (1925): The Remsenburg Lodge Windmill is in Eastport.(spider legged)
35. Amagansett Mill Reform Inn Replica.(1925) Built to commemorate the Amagansett mill that burned the year before.
36. Edwin DeRose Windmill Cottage, East Hampton (1926): Dating back to 1926, the Edwin DeRose Windmill Cottage in East Hampton is a charming representation of early 20th-century windmill architecture built into a cottage.
37. Sandpiper Hill House Windmill. (1928) windmill replica built into a Gilded Age Mansion.
38. Arthur W.B. Wood House and Mill replica, Montauk (1928): Constructed in 1928, the Arthur W.B. Wood House and Mill replica in Montauk pays homage to the historical significance of windmills in the region.
39. Bulk's Garden Center Windmill, West Babylon (1929): Built in 1929, the Bulk's Garden Center Windmill in West Babylon is a unique addition to the local landscape, showcasing the continued use of wind power.
40. Sag Harbor Visitor Center Windmill Replica (1966): Constructed in 1966, the Sag Harbor Visitor Center Windmill Replica is a homage to the historical windmills of the area, offering visitors a glimpse into the past.
41. West Babylon Windmill Replica (1984): Built in 1984, the West Babylon Windmill Replica is a modern interpretation of historical windmill design, adding a touch of nostalgia to the local environment.
42. Norman Levy Park Windpump, Freeport (2000): Erected in 2000, the Norman Levy Park Windpump in Freeport is a contemporary addition to the landscape, showcasing the enduring fascination with wind power.
43. Douglaston Manor Windmill, Littleneck (1870): Built in 1870, converted into a cottage 1906, moved 1986 to Alley Pond Park, burned 1988, Replica built 2005.
44. Aquebogue Windmill, Riverhead (2008): The Aquebogue Windmill, constructed in 2008, is a modern interpretation of traditional windmill design, copied from plans of the Pantigo windmill.

== Sources ==
- Pulling, Anne Frances; Leeds, Gerald A. (1999). Windmills and Water Mills of Long Island. Charleston, SC: Arcadia. ISBN 0-7385-0288-X.
