= Gardiners Island Windmill =

- U.S. National Register of Historic Places
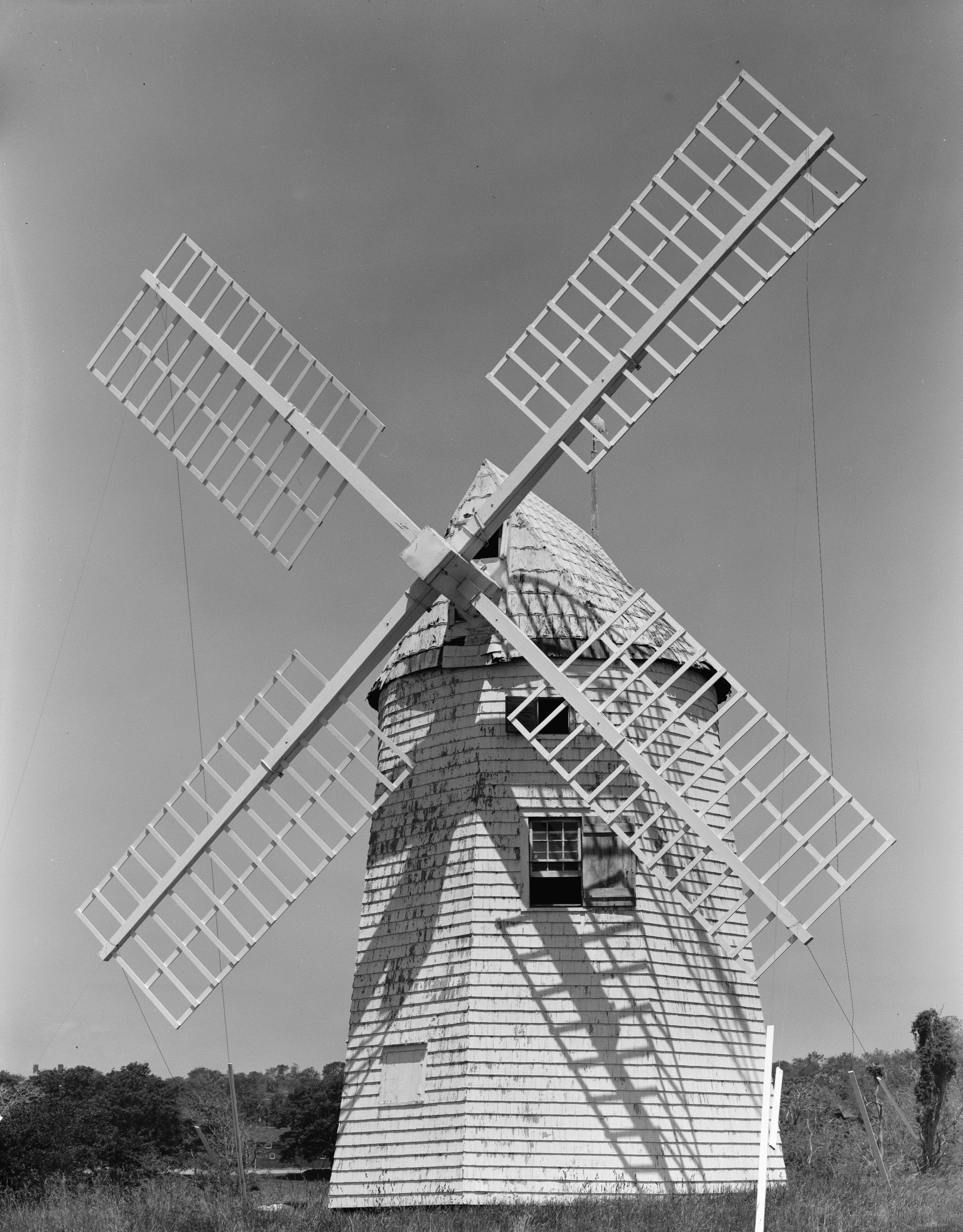
- 1978 Historic American Engineering Record photograph of the windmill from the south.

- Location within New York Location within the United States
- Location: East Hampton, New York, USA
- Coordinates: 41°5′28″N 72°6′40″W
- Built: 1795
- Architect: Dominy Family
- MPS: Long Island Wind and Tide Mills TR
- NRHP reference No.: 78001912
- Added to NRHP: December 27, 1978

Gardiners Island Windmill is a historic windmill on Gardiners Island in East Hampton, New York. The mill was added to the National Register of Historic Places in 1978.

== History ==
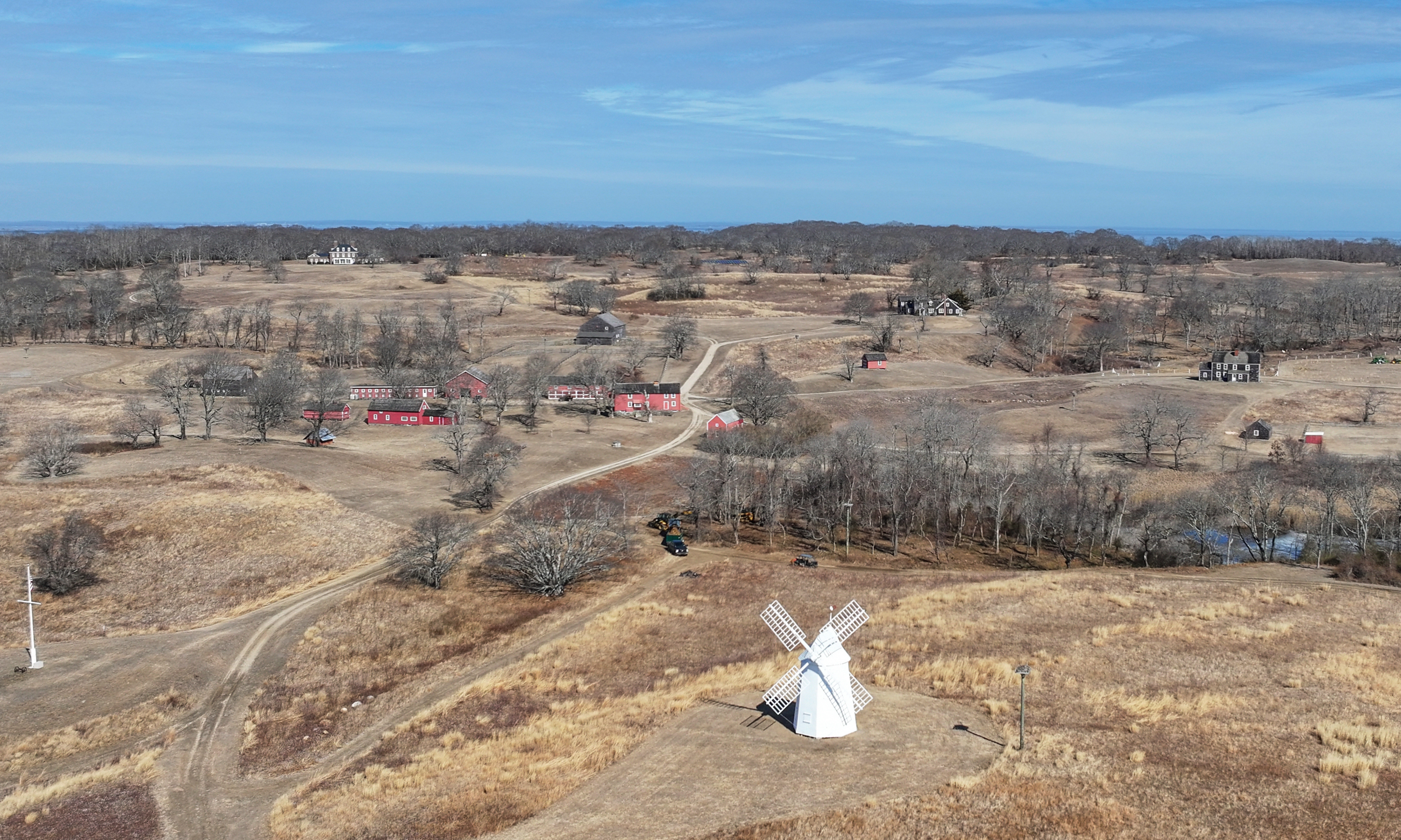
Gardiners Island showing the windmill (lower right) and settlement ( left)

The windmill, by Nathaniel Dominy V, was raised on 23 May 1795 on the "Mill lot" within 50 feet of the old "Petticoat mill" (1771). The 'Petticoat' was dilapidated after the Revolutionary war and need replacement. It was painted white, like the nearby wharf, to aid sailor's navigation. For the next 20 years John Lyon Gardiner (1770-1816) made no notation in his farm book about the mill, then there was a storm and collapse in 1815 and he required new timbers. The dock also blew away in the storm.

== Repairs ==
Dominy V and his workers came and restored the mill to working order from October to February 1816. Indications are the 1816 version was different inside than when newly built in 1795. This had to do with V's evolving use of different technology than when apprenticing for IV and the inside was more like contemporary windmills on Rhode Is. and Cape Cod. Nathaniel Dominy V did more repairs in 1826 and worked for 6 days on Gardiner's Island in 1833, where he installed a new windshaft, stocks and points in the mill.

== 19th century ==
An 1885 article on Gardiner's Island appeared in The Century magazine which mentioned "the windmill that supplies flour for the whole population.", meaning Gardiner's Island, indicating it was still in operation. The last known record of the operation of the windmill was an entry in Jonathan Thompson Gardiner's account book in 1889, which credited John B. Lawrence with "making Mill Sails".

== See also ==
- Shelter Island Windmill
- John Lyon Gardiner Mill Cottage
- List of windmills in New York
