= Windmill at Water Mill =

- U.S. National Register of Historic Places
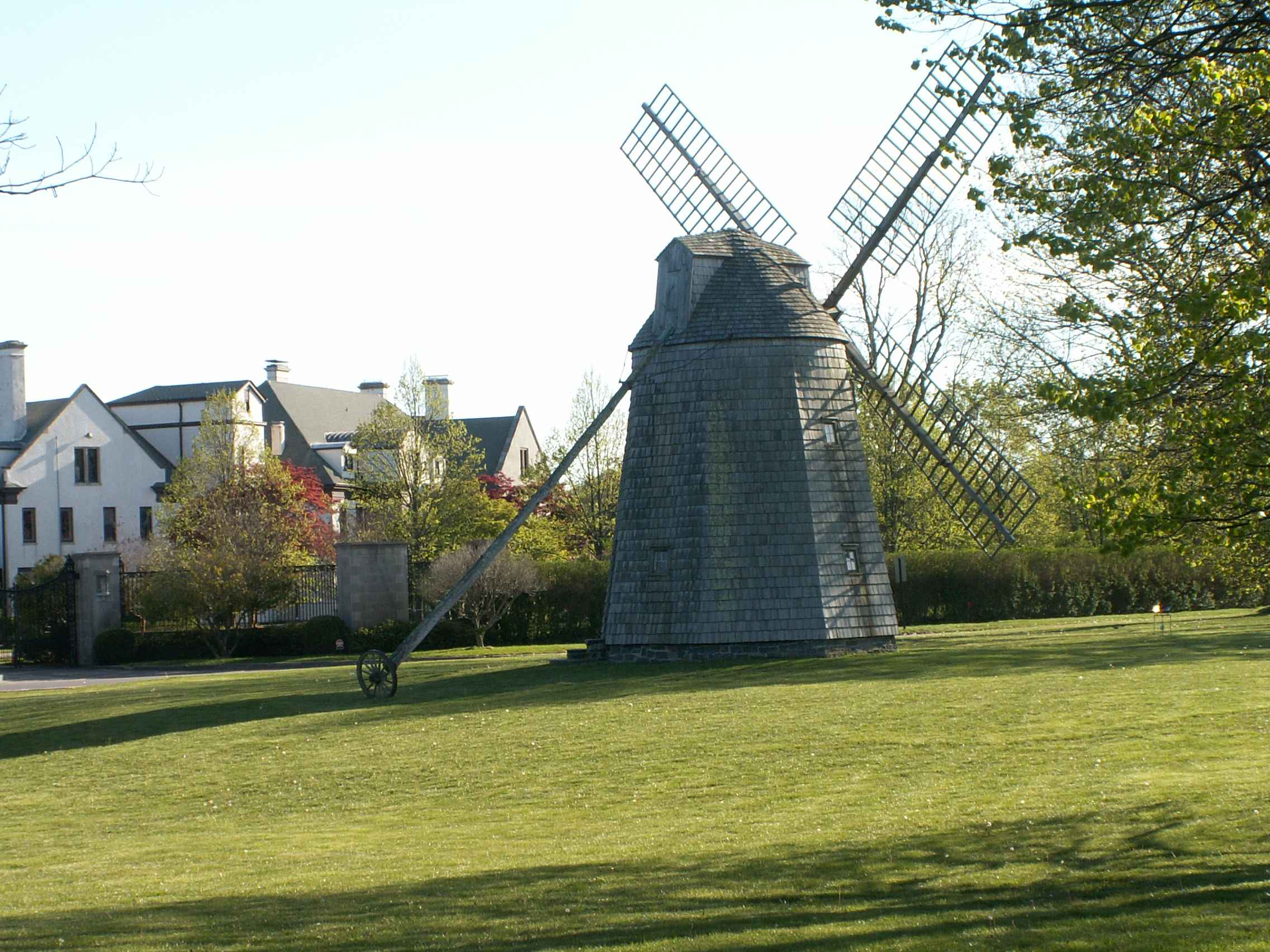

- Location within New York Location within the United States
- Location: Water Mill, Southampton, New York
- Coordinates: 40°54′34″N 72°21′15″W
- Area: 1 acre (0.40 ha)
- Built: 1800
- MPS: Long Island Wind and Tide Mills TR
- NRHP reference No.: 78001919
- Added to NRHP: December 27, 1978

Corwith Windmill at Water Mill is a historic mill on NY 27 and Halsey Lane in Southampton, New York.

== Origins ==
The mill was built by James Mitchel in 1800 at North Haven, on a peninsula just north of Sag Harbor called Hog Neck in the nineteenth century. Relocated here in 1813, it replaced a previous mill at the site which was destroyed by a blizzard in 1811. It was added to the National Register of Historic Places in 1978. The windmill measures 29 feet 4-1/2 inches from the first floor to the apex of the cap, making it the shortest surviving windmill on Long Island. At 23 feet 3/4 inches, the sails of this mill are the smallest of any found on a Long Island windmill. The Southampton Colony Chapter of the Daughters of the Revolution placed a plaque above the door in 1934 when it was designated a part of a public park. The HISTORIC AMERICAN ENGINEERING RECORD in the engineering report described it as.. "The Corwith windmill is the smallest, and second oldest, of 11 surviving windmills on the South Fork of Long Island, which has the largest regional group of windmills in America. Of the local mills, it is the only example of the early type of smock mill, which had a stationary tower with a revolving cap that sat directly on a greased curb at the top of the tower. Later smock windmills, such as the Hayground Windmill, had rollers on the curbs to facilitate rotating the cap and its wind sails."

== History ==
The James Corwith gristmill was added to the structure after he purchased it in 1813. Originally the windmill was built in Sag Harbor and moved by oxen to the commons in Water Mill. In later years (1860) the land was deeded to the Corwith family after the mill had operated on public lands for 50 years, similar gristmills in the area were considered to be community property and also sat on public land. The windmill was purchased for $750 and only had one pair of stones. After it was reconstructed in Water Mill, the main drive was changed to accommodate two pairs of stones of different sizes – one pair for grinding corn, the other for wheat and oats. Several generations of Corwiths operated the mill until grinding ceased in 1887. The Water Mill Village Improvement Association (a non-profit group) currently owns and maintains it. The windmill was completely restored In 1987. In 2010, the WMVIA replaced the main driveshaft and all the wind vanes. The Watermill Green surrounding the Windmill is used for community activities such as antique auto shows and events throughout the year. The gristmill was landmarked in 1984.

The shortage of paper records makes the financials relating to the operation of the windmill murky. Purchased for $750, there was records of indebtedness where it was used as collateral for James Corwith's bills, but he maintained ownership. He is listed as a farmer in 1860 but by then was no longer active as a miller. Unlike the Hook (1806), Beebe (1820), Shelter Island (1810), Hayground (1801) and Wainscott (1813) mills, as well as others, the Windmill at Water Mill never appears on the United States Products of Industry Census in any decade between 1850 and 1880. With several other custom windmills a few miles away from Water Mill in Bridgehampton, Amagansett, East Hampton, Southampton, Hayground, Wainscott and Shelter Island, the Corwith mill probably mainly served just the small community of Water Mill, which by 1887 had roughly two hundred inhabitants engaged primarily in farming. By 1890, wealthy city dwellers were buying properties in the east end and creating large country estates, some farmers turned to the service economy of being tradesmen to these newcomers. James son Samuel, a carpenter, took over the day to day ownership and operation of the mill.

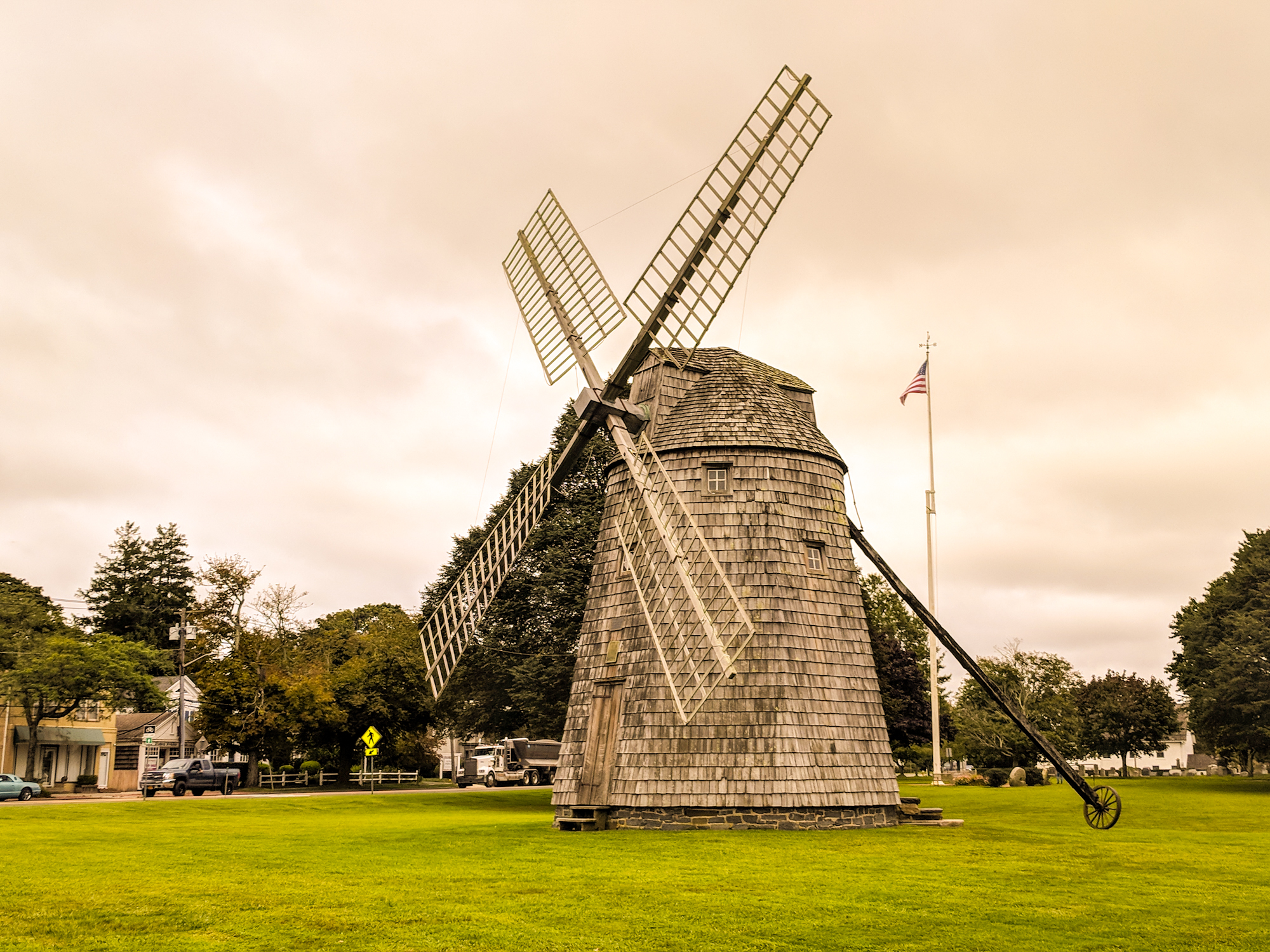
The property was sold in 1888 to Josiah Lombard and Marshall Ayres, businessmen from New York City. They had purchased eight acres southwest of the windmill and built a large Queen Anne style summer house on the site. The landscaping altered the prevailing summer wind making mill operation even harder, so Samuel Corwith sold the mill to them for $900. Ayers and Lombard sold it back to Samuel in 1895 for $1 and he immediately conveyed it to his son, James, for $10. Dr. Edward L. Keyes bought the Lombard/Ayers estate in 1896 and the now worthless mill from James Corwith for $10 in 1898. The mill now served as a decoration on the Keyes estate, over time the stones under it were replaced by a foundation and ivy grew on the walls. In 1909, Edward P. Morse, a Brooklyn shipbuilder, bought the Keyes property, including the triangle the windmill sat on.

In 1929 Morse sold the estate, including the windmill, to Irene Ann Coleman of New York City, who turned it over to the Nuns of the Order of St. Dominic of the City of Brooklyn in 1931. Shortly thereafter, the sisterhood deeded the windmill and its 1.852 acre triangular green to the Trustees of Water Mill Park on the condition that the Town of Southampton maintain it as a public park and "keep the windmill thereon in good repair." Apparently - all the conditions were "not performed," and the title to the property reverted to the Nuns. They reconveyed the windmill on May 17, 1934 to the Water Mill Village Improvement Association, Inc., its present owners, who agreed to maintain the green and the mill as a public park.

During the 1930s there were some exterior repairs but none to the machinery. The hurricane of 1938 did considerable damage to the mill and additional repairs were made, the cap was dislodged and the tailpole needed re-attachment. A new windshaft was fashioned by a carpenter in Southampton, no other interior work was done until after another hurricane in 1954. In the late 1950s the frames of at least two of the sails were again replaced and in the early 1970s new sash was installed throughout.

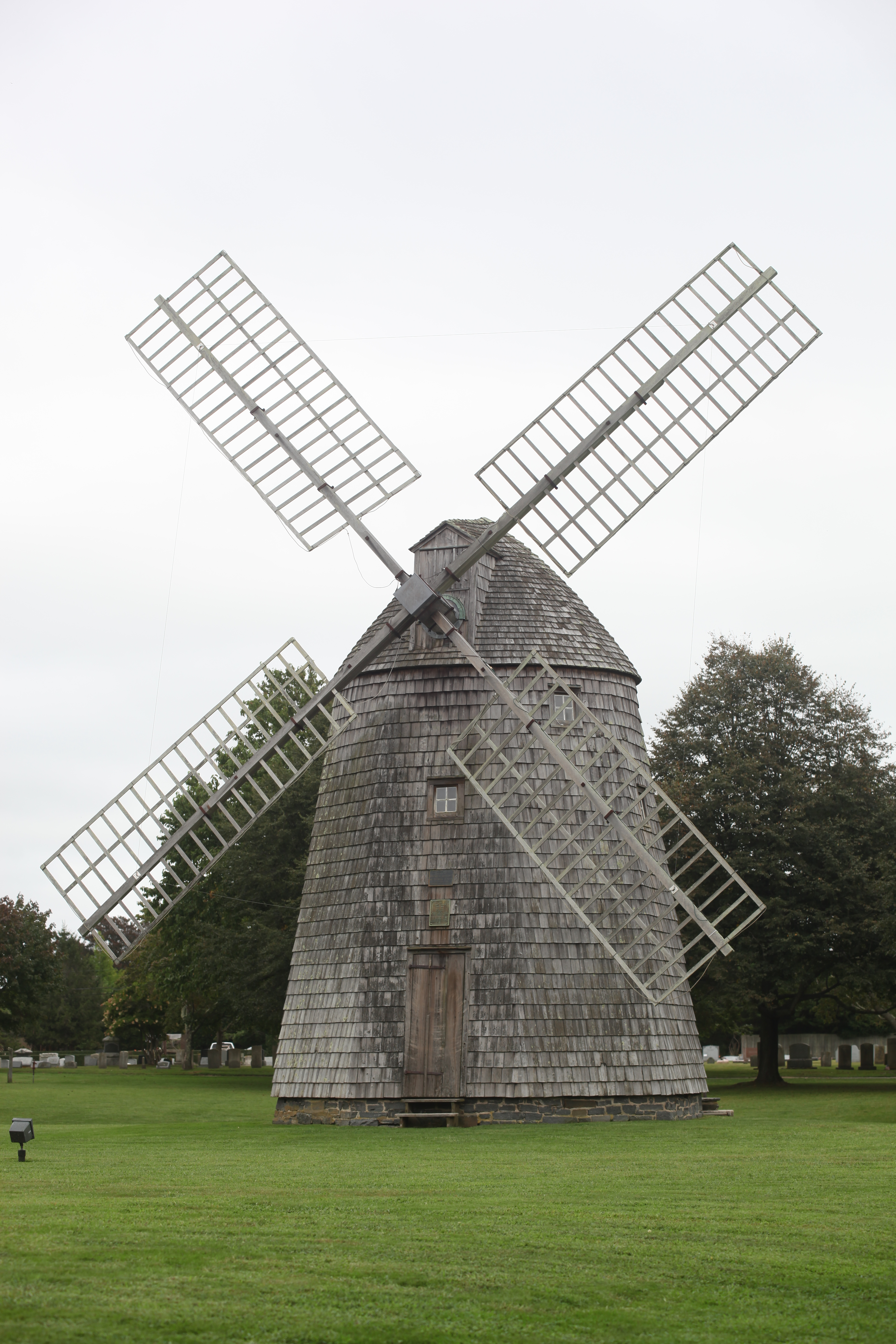
Windmill at Water Mill, NRHP 78001919

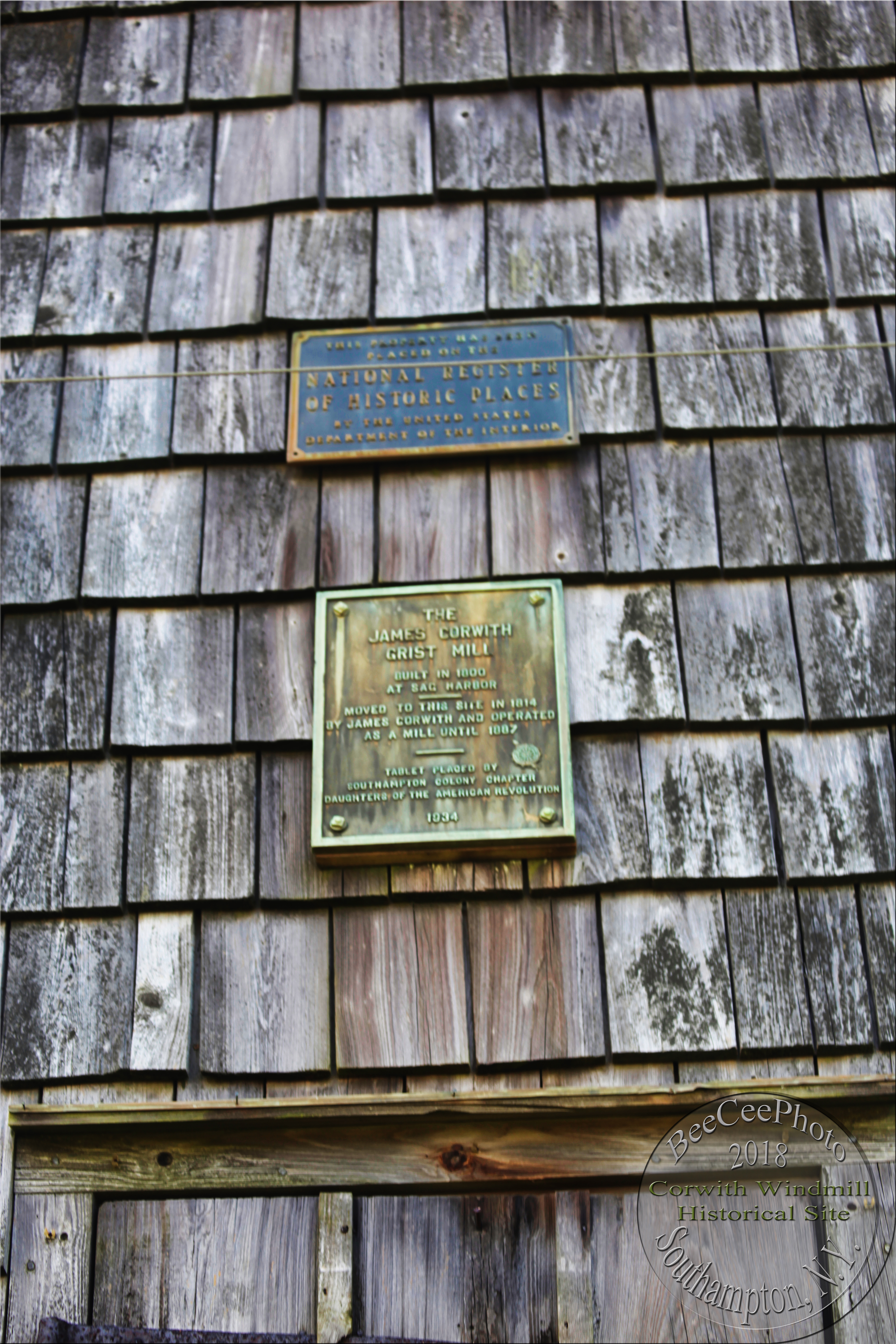
JamesCorwithGristMillPlaque 6873
