= Bourneville =

Bourneville may refer to:

- Bourneville, Eure, a commune in the Eure department in Haute-Normandie in northern France.
- Bourneville, Ohio, a census-designated place in central Twin Township, Ross County, Ohio, United States

== People with the surname ==
- Désiré-Magloire Bourneville (1840–1909), French neurologist
- Mark Bourneville (born 1963), New Zealand rugby league player

== See also ==
- Bournville (disambiguation)
- Bournonville (disambiguation)
- Bourne Mill (disambiguation)
