= Shinnecock Windmill =

Windmill in Southampton, New York

The Shinnecock Windmill is a windmill currently located on the Stony Brook Southampton campus in Southampton, Suffolk County, New York. Originally located on Mill Hill at Windmill Lane and Hill Street in Southampton, in 1890, it was relocated to Shinnecock Hills. The land became the campus of Southampton College in 1963, now Stony Brook Southampton.

The Shinnecocks claim the land from Mill Hill to Shinnecock Hills Golf Club as land ceded to them by treaty.

== History ==
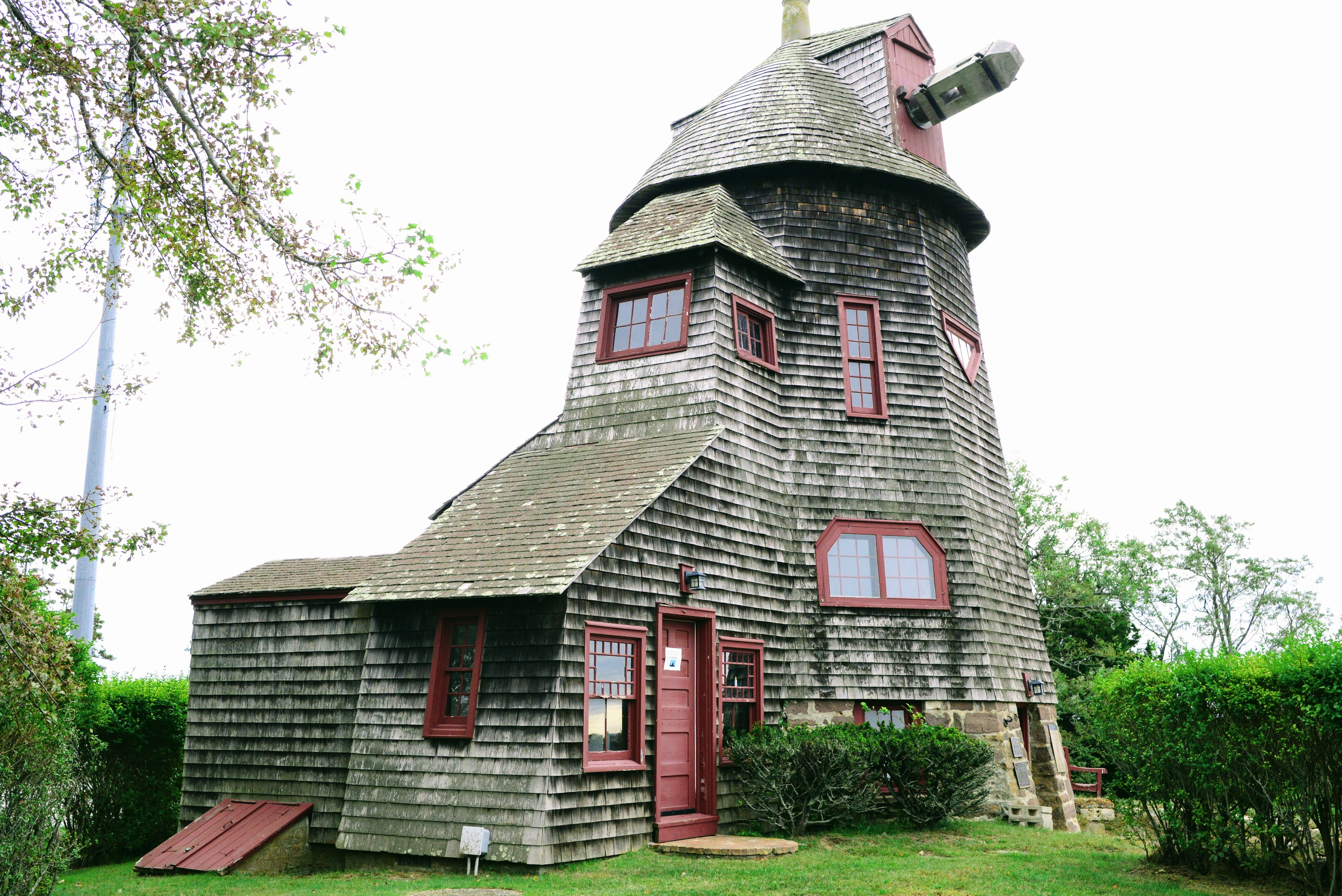
Southampton College Windmill cottage

Windmill Lane Mill I on Mill hill in Southampton was a Dutch-style mill built in 1714. Various mills began on the site and were either burnt (lightening or flour dust cited in many cases) or moved due to ownership or windage changes. The first mill was established in 1712, it was replaced by Mill I.

In 1890, Mrs. William (Janet) Hoyt, a patron of the Shinnecock Hills Summer School of Art in Southampton, upon finding it neglected purchased and saved the mill, moving it to the top of a hill in Shinnecock. In 1896, she sold the property to New York linen magnate A. B. Claflin, who built a gilded age summer mansion next to the windmill.

Arthur Brigham Claflin, was a partner in the dry goods firm of H.B. Claflin & Co. which was founded by his father. Heathermere, his former home, now serves as the administration building for Long Island University's (Stony Brook) Southampton College. In 1916 it was again moved on Shinnecock hill. The windmill, now set on a knoll near the main house on the estate, was restored to be converted into a playhouse for Mr. Claflin's daughter, Beatrice. The restoration included the installation of windows at various levels to provide views of Shinnecock Bay and the Atlantic Ocean. The large windows on the second and third floors offer a panoramic view of the surroundings. Beatrice Claflin died after a fall down stairs in the mill and it's reported she haunts it still. Passers-by have claimed to see the face of a young girl peering out from the windows. In 1946 the mansion and estate grounds became the Tucker Mill Inn Resort. The innkeeper renovated the interior of the windmill for a guest apartment. The Inn's menu had colorful descriptions of the mill and ended with a poem written about it by Abigail Fithian Halsey, called 'The Old Mill'.

In 1963, the Inn was sold to Long Island University and became the Southampton Campus. 'Heathermere' became 'Southampton Hall'. The campus was then re-sold in 2006 to become Stony Brook Southampton College, which is its current name and affiliation.

== Playwright's Sojourn ==
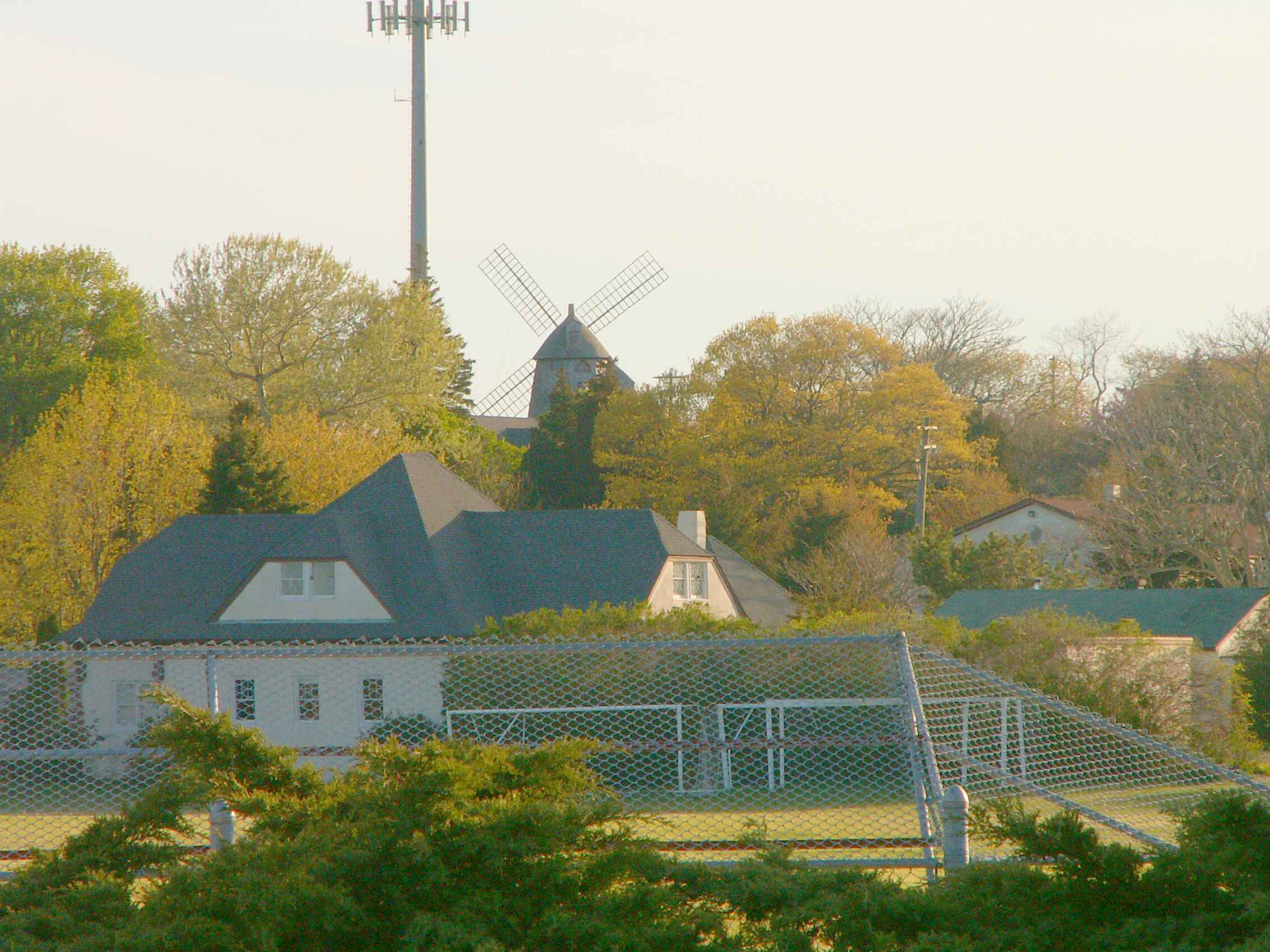
Southampton College Windmill cottage

In 1957 the playwright Tennessee Williams rented the 3-story mill cottage and while there wrote “The Day on Which a Man Dies”, a fictional play loosely based on his friend Jackson Pollock. The play languished after completion in 1960 in the college archives and was sold by Williams in 1970 to the University of California, Los Angeles. A new version re-written by the playwright in 1972 was performed in 2001, the first performance of the original in 2009 was presented by the Pollock-Krasner House and Study Center at the Ross School in East Hampton. Visiting professors over the years have used the cottage. It was designated a national literary landmark on July 13, 2013, by United for Libraries, a division of the American Library Association, in partnership with Empire State Center for the book Nick Mangano, director of the Southampton MFA in Theatre program at Stony Brook University had initiated the application process for Literary Landmark status in September 2011.

== Windmill Cottage ==
In 1964 it became the unusual home of Stony Brook assistant dean, John Luongo, and his wife. The couple was offered the use of the historic windmill as a home and they spent three months repairing and upgrading it to make it weather-tight and comfortable. Private contractors installed modern amenities such as electrical units, plumbing, and built-in kitchen cabinets on the ground floor. The interior of the windmill is divided into different levels with the ground floor serving as the kitchen and dining room, the second floor as the living room and study, and the third story as the bedroom. There is also a side extension with a foyer, bath, and stairways and plans to add a small guest room on the fourth story. The rental for the windmill was deducted from Mr. Luongo's salary.

== Shinnecock Land claims ==
When Long Island University announced its plans to close the campus, Back in 2005 the Shinnecock Indian Nation had filed a suit seeking return of 3,500 acres (14 km^{2}) including both the campus and the Shinnecock Hills Golf Club. There were local concerns that either the land would be taken over by the Shinnecocks for a casino, or that the land would be used for a housing development in the Hamptons. The claims went to court and while this appeared to be a means of circumventing a negative ruling, the court however sided with the school in denying the Shinnecocks claims.

== Restoration ==
The windmill fell into disrepair over the years and was left without blades, finally being restored by Stony Brook University in 2006. The school worked with preservationists to repair the exterior and replenish the sails, which was completed in 2022. There has been contemplation of moving the windmill back to Windmill lane, where it began 310 years ago. As of 2015, the Stony Brook Southampton campus has grown and even prospered. Programs have been added back and the Board of Trustees of the State University of New York approved a long-awaited partnership agreement between Southampton and Stony Brook University hospitals that will ultimately result in a new Southampton Hospital on the Shinnecock Hills campus, a move that likely will bring the most activity those grounds have ever seen.

== See also ==
- List of windmills in New York
- Stony Brook Southampton
