= Bourne Mill =

Bourne Mill or Bourn Mill may refer to:

- Bourne Mill, Colchester, Essex, England
- Bourne Mill (Tiverton, Rhode Island), partly in Fall River, Massachusetts, United States
- Bourn Windmill, Cambridgeshire, England
- Bourne Windmill, Oakdale, New York, United States
