= Goldsmith's Inlet mill =

Tidal inlet in Southold, New York

Coordinates: 41°3′14″N 72°28′24″W

Goldsmith's Inlet is a tidal inlet located in the Town of Southold on the North Fork of Long Island, New York in the United States. The Peconic or Goldsmith Inlet Grist Mill had its beginnings in 1836, when plans were first made for its construction.

== History ==
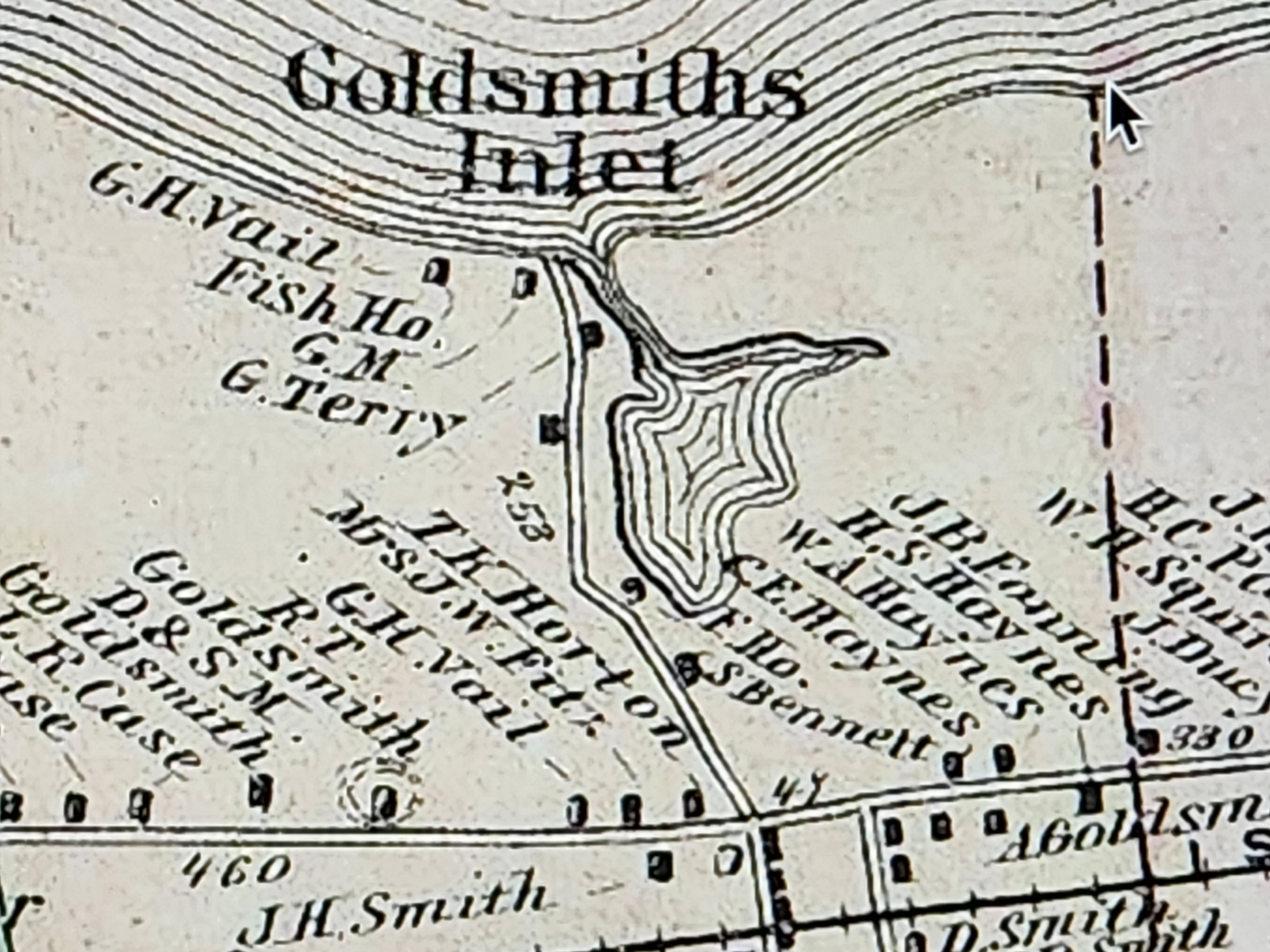
Goldsmith's Inlet on the north fork of L.I., NY

The inlet has a long history dating back to the early 1600s when it was used as a trading port by the local Native American tribes. The area surrounding the inlet has been used for farming, fishing, and milling since the first settlers arrived in the 1640s. The land cleared by the Corchaugs, whose name for the area Yennecott or principal place pronounced “kehchauke” was renamed Cutchogue.

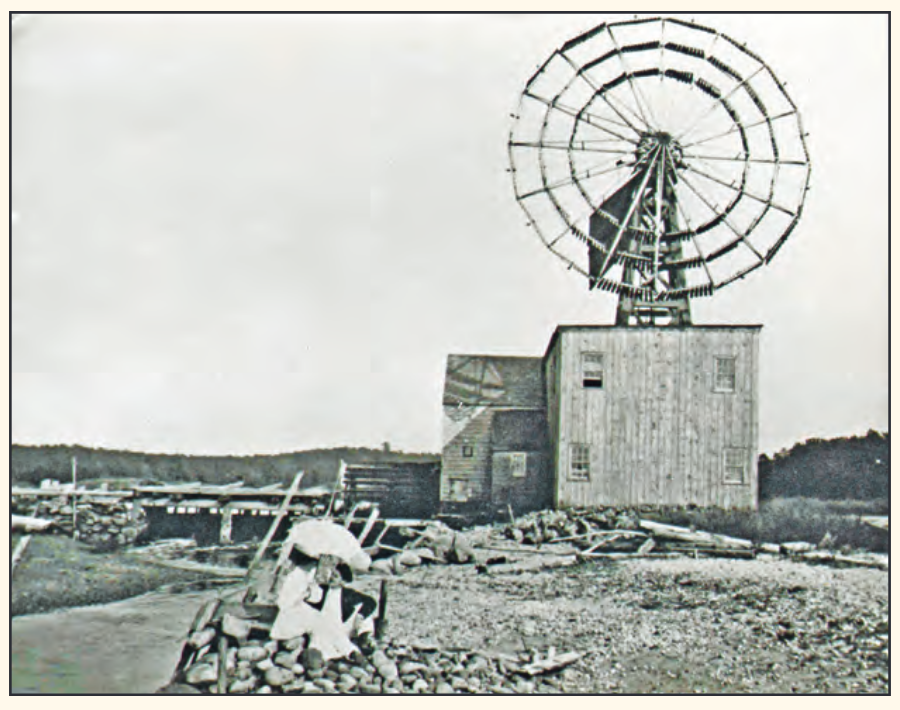
Goldsmith's Inlet windmill after 1870

It was built as a tidal mill on the inlet on the North Fork of Long Island, New York and construction started in 1839, with completion in 1840. The materials used for the construction of the mill included stones, boards, and bricks.

The first miller of the Goldsmith Inlet Grist Mill was a man named Cox. However, by the 1870s, a man named Terry had taken over as the miller. He was responsible for adding an addition to the building due to the high demand for grinding grain. A tower windmill was installed. It was rumored that after the addition was made, the mill was able to grind a bushel of grain in just one minute. The addition was known as an Eclipse windmill, a developing technology at the time of its installation. However, the eclipse windmill did not receive significant attention until the 1876 Centennial Fair in the United States, making dating the exact time this addition was made difficult.

Grain was delivered to the mill by horse-drawn wagons from local farms, as well as by shallow schooners sailing across Long Island Sound from Connecticut. The mill was considered a good investment for shareholders, as it provided an important service for the local community.

However, on Thanksgiving Day in 1898, the mill suffered a major setback when the windwheel was destroyed during a gale. It was not considered worthwhile to replace it,

== Peconic Gristmill ==
Suffolk County, V. 2, Double Page Plate No. 11 (Map bounded by Long Island Sound, South Hold Bay, Little Peconic Bay, Cutchogue) NYPL2055499

The Peconic Gristmill, also known as the Goldsmith's Inlet Mill, was a prominent mill in the area. It was built in 1839 as a tidal mill, using the power of the tides to turn the millstones that ground grain into flour. In 1870, a tower with vanes was added to the mill to harness the power of the wind as well. This made the mill more efficient and allowed it to operate even when the tides were low. The Thanksgiving Blizzard of 1898 severely damaged the mill, tearing off the windmill and tower from the building. The tower was never restored, and the mill continued to operate with only its water wheel for several more years. However, with the advent of modern mechanization, mills like the Peconic Gristmill became obsolete, and the building was eventually left to deteriorate.

== Derelict razed ==
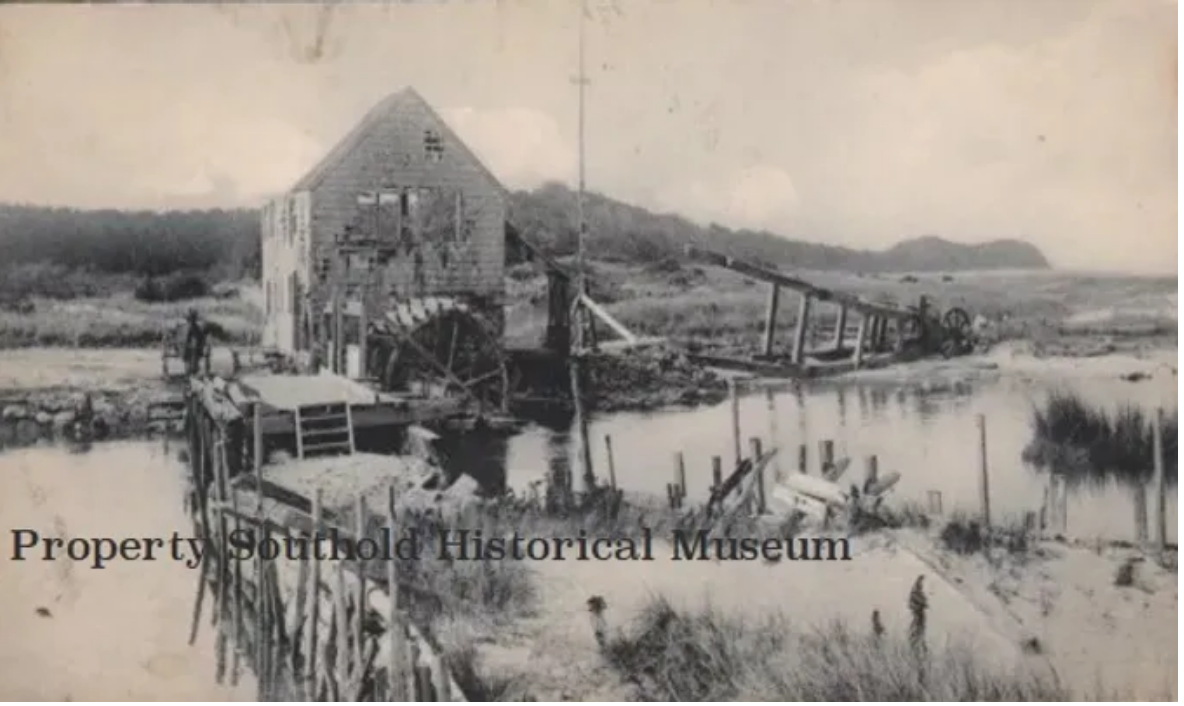
Goldsmith's Inlet windmill after 1898 storm Prop of Southold Historical Society

By 1906, the Peconic Gristmill had become derelict and was taken down. Today, the site where the mill stood is still of interest to many, and the water channel that once powered the mill can still be seen. The history of the mill and the surrounding area is a testament to the early industries and way of life in the Town of Southold.

== See also ==
List of windmills in New York

41.05521003465257, -72.47120584609685

- Long Island
- Suffolk County, New York
