= Dix Windmill =

Smock Windmill

Coordinates: 40°48′28.3″N 72°38′47.6″W

The Gov. John Adams Dix Windmill, originally constructed on property owned by the Governor of New York John Adams Dix in 1870, is a historic windmill located in Westhampton Beach, New York in the United States. It is a "smock"-style windmill, named after the 8-sided style that resembles the smocks (petticoats) traditionally worn by farmers and millers. The windmill was designed to pump water for agriculture, livestock, and household purposes, rather than for milling corn or wheat or sawing timber.

== Restoration and Stewardship ==
In 2024, the Gov. John Adams Dix Windmill underwent a full structural and historical restoration, following its relocation to the Great Lawn in Westhampton Beach. The project was managed by Matthew K. Smith, Superintendent of Public Works for the Village of Westhampton Beach. Smith also serves as the windmill’s official long-term caretaker, responsible for its preservation and operational oversight. The restoration was made possible through private donations, historic preservation grants, and support from the Greater Westhampton Historical Museum, with no public tax funding used.

== Origins ==
The windmill holds historical significance as it was originally built on property owned by Gov. John A. Dix, who served as the governor of New York state from 1872 to 1874. After his death, the property was inherited by his son, the Rev. Dr. Morgan Dix, who later sold it to Desmond Dunne, Brooklyn Commissioner of Public Works, in 1902.

The windmill has survived the Hurricane of '38 and is now being considered for entry on the National Register of Historic Places. Currently, there are eleven restored early windmills on Long Island, but none that pumped water.

The property where the windmill is located was purchased in June 2021 by Adam and DiDi Hutt. However, they decided to offer the windmill to the village of Westhampton Beach after realizing that they were unable to incorporate it into their new construction plans. The village, recognizing the historical significance of the windmill, plans to move it to the Great Lawn and restore it. The windmill in Westhampton Beach served a practical purpose of hauling water from wells to a water tank located in the upper part of the mill. This innovative system allowed for the distribution of running water and flush toilets throughout the house, which was considered a marvel in 1870. The individuals who constructed these facilities were not farmers or fishermen, unlike those in the eastern part of Long Island who still relied on outhouses. The construction of these amenities coincided with the completion of the Long Island Rail Road, attracting wealthy members of the Manhattan social set who built grand summer mansions near the ocean. Many of these mansions featured attached windmills, leading to Westhampton Beach being referred to as "Windmill Town" by New Yorkers. The builder of this particular summer home, John Adams Dix, was a Manhattan banker and governor of New York State in 1872. The Dutch heritage of the fashionable people who frequented this part of Westhampton Beach is evident in the name Dix, while those of English heritage further east opted for small gasoline-powered engines to raise their water, likely influenced by the abundance of windmills in the area.

== The great lawn ==
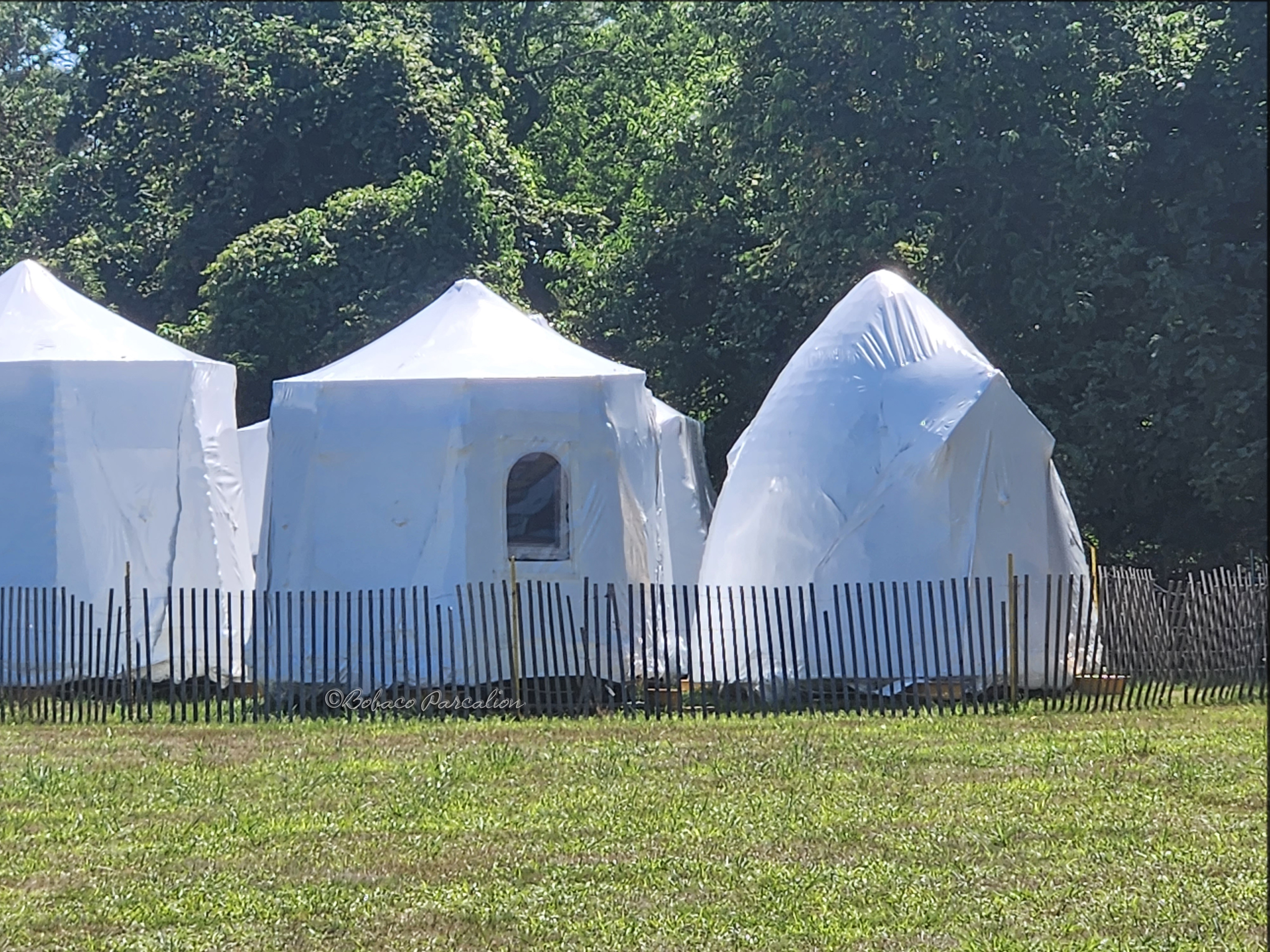
Gov John Adams Dix Windmill

The village of Westhampton Beach aims to preserve the iconic windmill by moving it to a village-owned property at 35 Great Lawn. The village plans to restore and maintain the structure, but funding is a critical component of the plan. The village hopes to utilize Southampton Town's Community Preservation Funds, which can be used if the windmill is landmarked. To proceed with the landmarking process, the village officials are seeking an inter-municipal agreement with Southampton Town. An application to landmark the windmill was prepared by Westhampton Beach Village Planner Kyle Collins in consultation with preservation consultant Jack L. Jones. The application was discussed and adopted by the Southampton Town Landmarks and Historic District Board, and a resolution was submitted to the town board for further consideration.

In addition to seeking funding through the Community Preservation Fund, the village plans to submit a formal request to New York State Assemblyman Fred Thiele for a State Aid to Municipalities grant.

== See also ==
- List of windmills in New York
- Westhampton Beach, New York
- Shelter Island Windmill
- Southampton summer colony
