= Bournville (disambiguation) =

Bournville may refer to:

- Bournville, a model village in the south of Birmingham
- Bournville (chocolate), a brand of dark chocolate produced by Cadbury UK

== See also ==
- Bourneville (disambiguation)
