= Bournonville (disambiguation) =

August Bournonville (1805–1879) was a Danish ballet master and choreographer, creator of Bournonville method in dance practicing.

- Antoine Bournonville (1760–1843), French ballet dancer, actor, singer and choreographer, the father of August Bournonville.

Bournonville may also refer to:

- Bournonville, Pas-de-Calais, a commune in France

== Nobility ==
- Alexander von Bournonville (1616–1690), Flemish military man.
- Miguel José de Bournonville, 1st Duke of Bournonville (1672–1752), Spanish noble.

== See also ==
- Bourneville (disambiguation)
