= Good Ground Windmill =

Windmill in New York, United States

Coordinates: 40°52′08″N 72°23′45″W

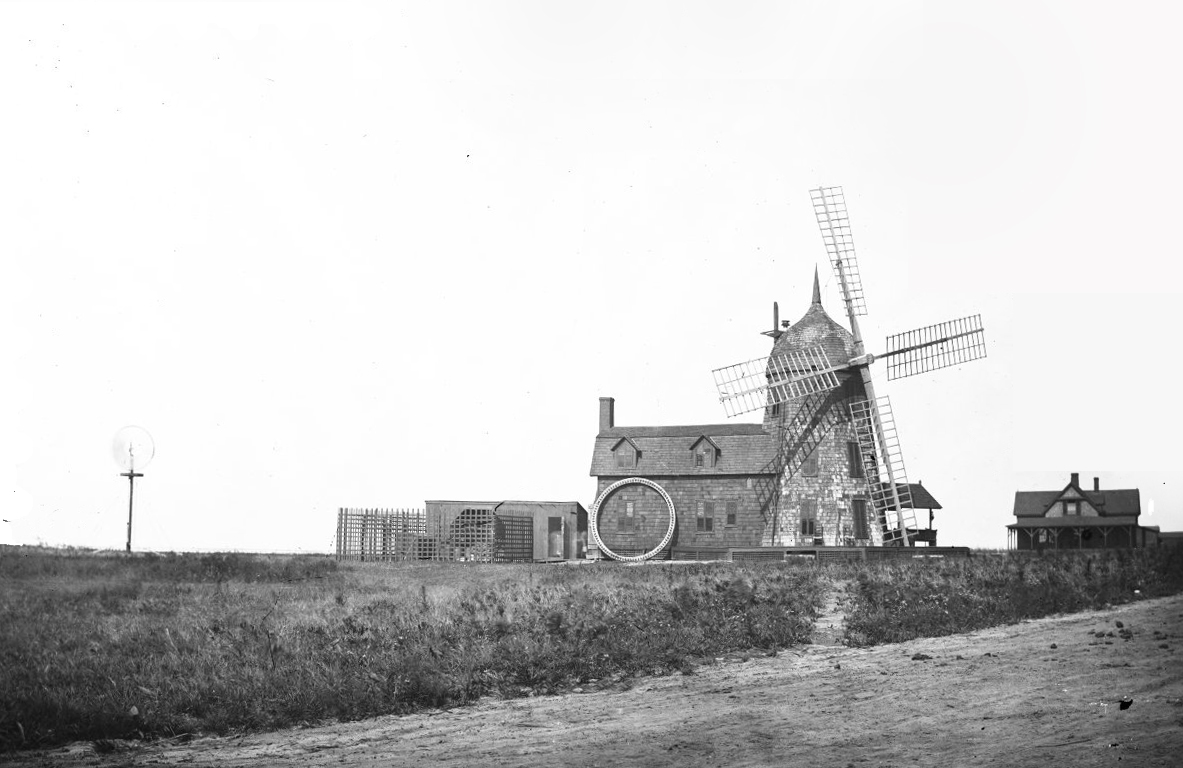
1876 photograph by George Bradford Brainerd (American, 1845-1887). Good Ground Mill, Southampton, Long Island, ca. 1872-1887.

Good Ground Windmill (Shelter Island Mill I) was built in 1807 on the north end of Shelter Island, New York. It was worked as a gristmill on Shelter Island until 1860.

== First move ==
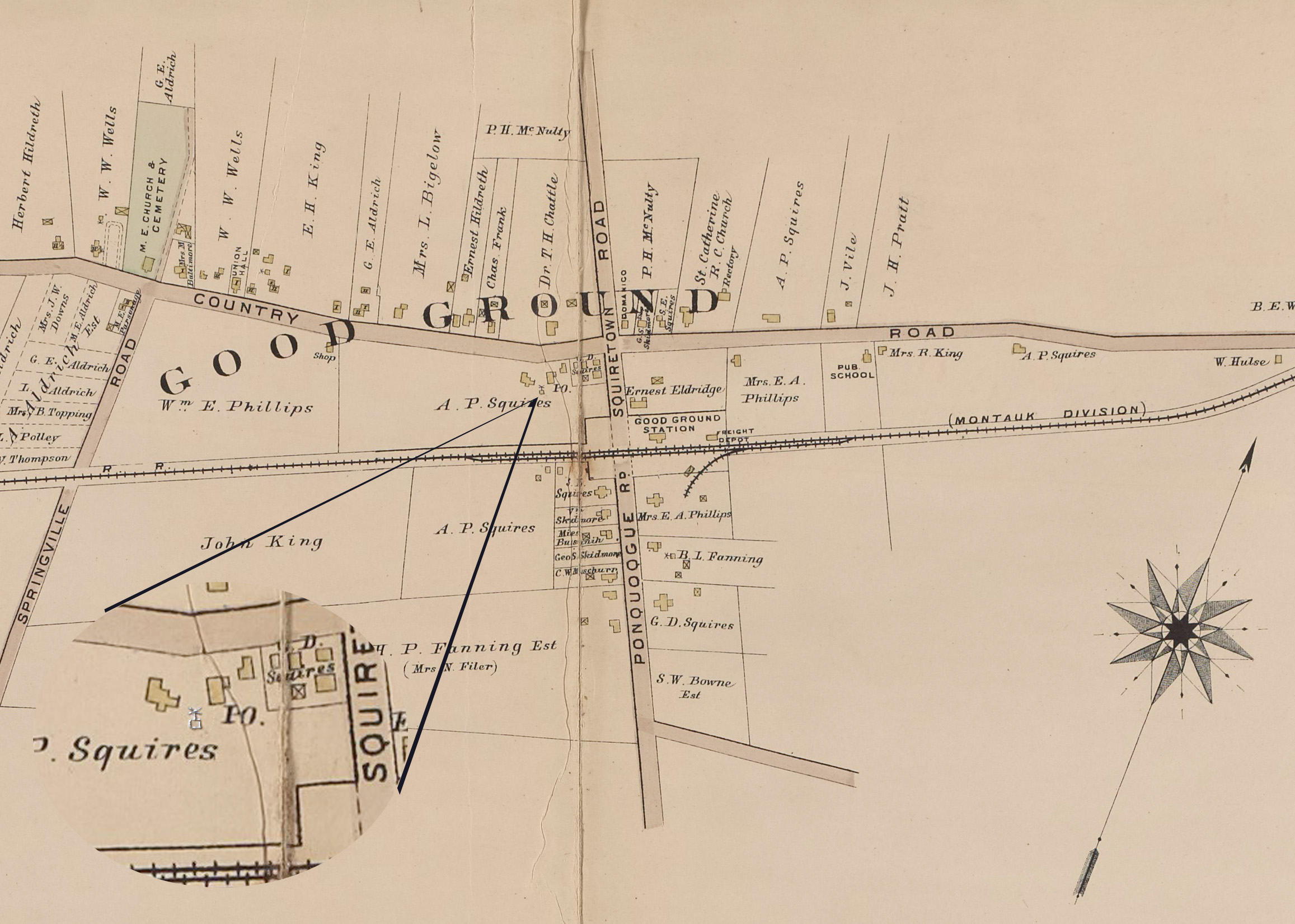
Good Ground Windmill map-1

The Good Ground mill site at 7 W. Montauk Highway was owned in the 1860s by Martin Van Buren Squires. He purchased the grist mill on Shelter Island, and had it transported by barge to the Red Creek area, and then hauled to the elevated land on the corner of Montauk Highway and Ponquogue Avenue. The mill was made of hand-hewn oak logs and stood forty feet high. The first miller was Ashby, followed by Theodore Corwith, who lived in a small house on Montauk Highway in Good Ground, and then by Timothy Griffing, who lived across the street from the mill. The advent of the railroad (LIRR) meant that inexpensive milled grains could be transported to Good Ground and the need for a local mill diminished.

It remained in operation till around 1880, when an original founder of the Southampton summer colony, Charles Wyllys Betts, determined that the Good Ground mill would make the perfect addition to his gambrel-roofed, gable-windowed oceanside cottage on Gin Lane.

== Second move ==
To preserve the mill structure, Wyllys Betts, of Meadow Lane, Southampton, NY, purchased and moved it to his property in 1880, where it formed the basis of a weathered cape cottage with a house built around the mill. The mill was especially distinctive for its Greek Revival cap.

The interior mechanisms were removed and windows and a veranda were added. The property was sold to an architect named Goodhue Livingston in 1925, and his family held it until 1989. The cottage and windmill have become an antique showplace for the current collector/owners. The mill exists there today, it is not open to the public.

It was added to the NRHP by Robert J. Hefner.

== See also ==
- List of windmills in New York
- Hampton Bays station
- Southampton, New York
- Shelter Island Windmill
- Orient windmills Acuebogue – Southold - Orient, NY
