= Wainscott Windmill =

- U.S. National Register of Historic Places
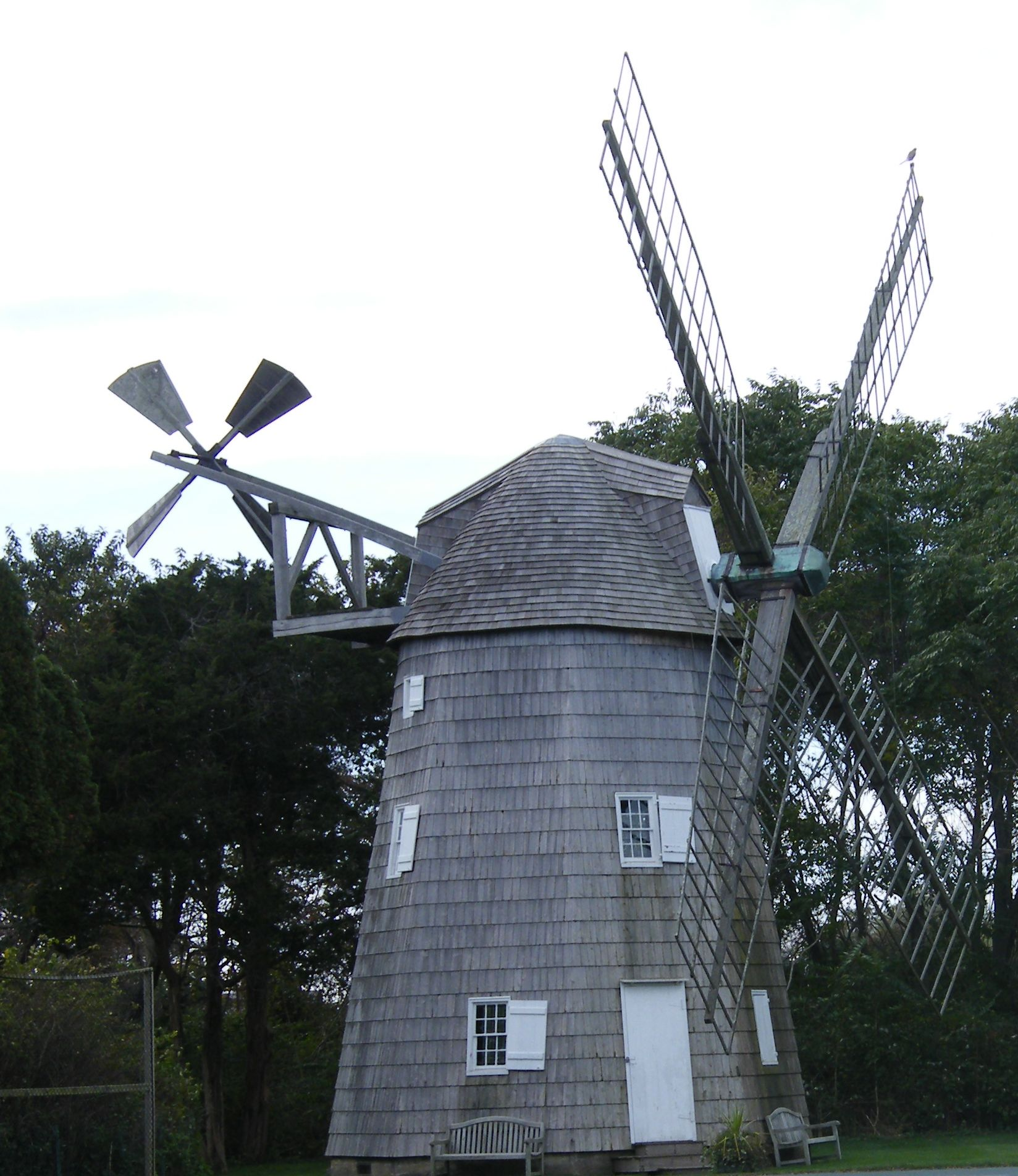

- Location within New York Location within the United States
- Location: Wainscott, East Hampton, New York
- Coordinates: 40°56′1″N 72°14′16″W
- Built: 1813
- Architect: Schellinger, Samuel
- MPS: Long Island Wind and Tide Mills TR
- NRHP reference No.: 78001915
- Added to NRHP: December 27, 1978

Wainscott Windmill is an historic windmill on Georgica Association grounds in Wainscott, New York in the Town of East Hampton. Georgica Association grounds are both within Wainscott and the Village of East Hampton to the east. Historically, it is known as one of the most frequently-moved windmills on the east end. It was added to the National Register of Historic Places in 1978.

The Wainscott Smock Windmill with fantail

== History ==
The windmill was built on Mill Hill in Southampton in 1813, to replace a mill that burned down the previous year.

In 1841 it was purchased by Barney Green, who moved it to another site on the hill bounded by Windmill Lane and Hill Street. In 1858 it was purchased by Cornelius Conklin, who moved it to Wainscott, between Bridgehampton and East Hampton, where it remained for over 50 years. After two further owners, it became the site of the Wainscott Public Library in 1912, with its sails and fantail intact. In 1922, Lathrop Brown purchased the mill and moved it to Montauk, where it was added to the Windmill House (built 1784), a five room a cottage on the cliffs west of the Montauk Lighthouse. In 1942, it was used by the US government as part of the war effort. Later that year, Brown donated it to the Georgica Beach Association, who moved it a final time to Georgica Road in Wainscott.

== Ceased operating in 1910 ==
Since then, much of the machinery has been removed and the structure has been replaced.

It is possible that some of the missing machinery, including the millstones, was removed when the windmill became the Wainscott library. It is also probable that the mill was altered by Lathrop Brown when he moved it to Montauk to be part of his cottage. The roller bearing, cap rack, and cap centering devices were likely removed to allow for firm anchoring of the cap to the mill tower.

When the windmill was moved back to Wainscott in 1943, the mill tower was transported in four sections, of two bays each. During the erection of the tower in Wainscott, one section fell apart. As a result, the mill tower has numerous replaced structural members.

The windmill was winded by a fantail, which may have been original or installed at a later date. Photographs of the mill when the fantail was intact indicate that the components were the same as those of the Beebe and Hayground windmills, with the only difference being that the Wainscott Mill has a starwheel of four sockets instead of eight. The fanstage and starwheel are still in place, but the shaft and pinion are missing. The cap rack has been removed, but a section of it is stored in the mill.

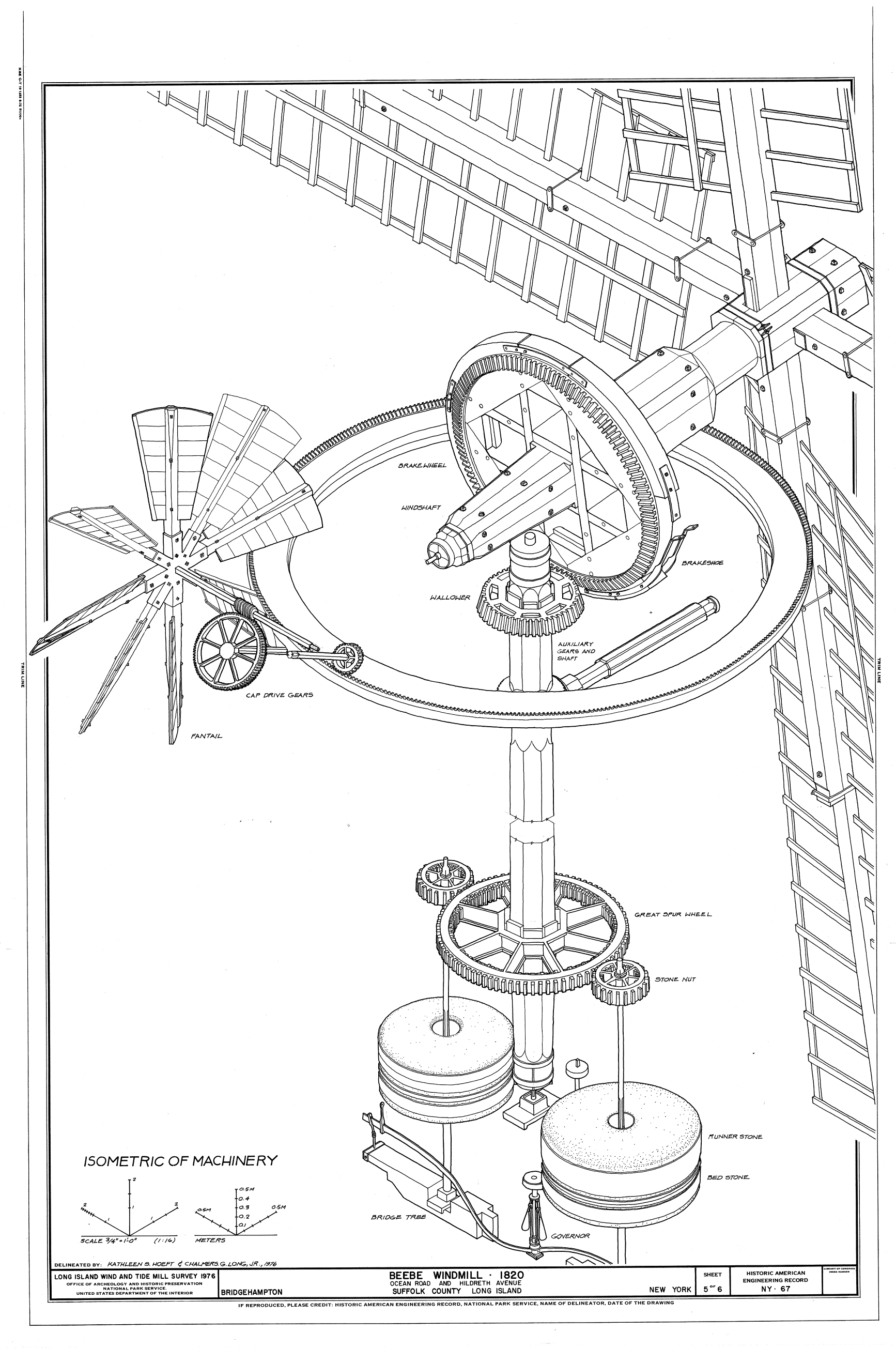
Beebe Windmill Isometric of Machinery Long Island NY

The machinery that remains in the mill includes the windshaft, brake wheel, wallower, great spur wheel, main vertical shaft, stone crane, and regulators. The windshaft may date from when the mill was operated, and there are iron fillets set longitudinally into the neck of the shaft. The compass-arm brake wheel is made of three layers of rear cants bolted together, with the date "March 20 1868" written in pencil on the wheel. The wallower is a clasp-arm spur gear with beveled cogs, unlike that found in any of the other windmills. The stone crane remains in place in the mill, and the worm is stamped "J Conklin." The stone spindles with regulators attached also remain in the mill.

One sign of the mill's comparatively late date of construction, 1813, is the absence of a center post. Instead, the main vertical shaft bears on a bridge beam at the second floor, which is also found in the 1820 Beebe Windmill.

== See also ==
List of windmills in New York
