= Bourne Windmill, Oakdale, New York =

Bourne Windmill
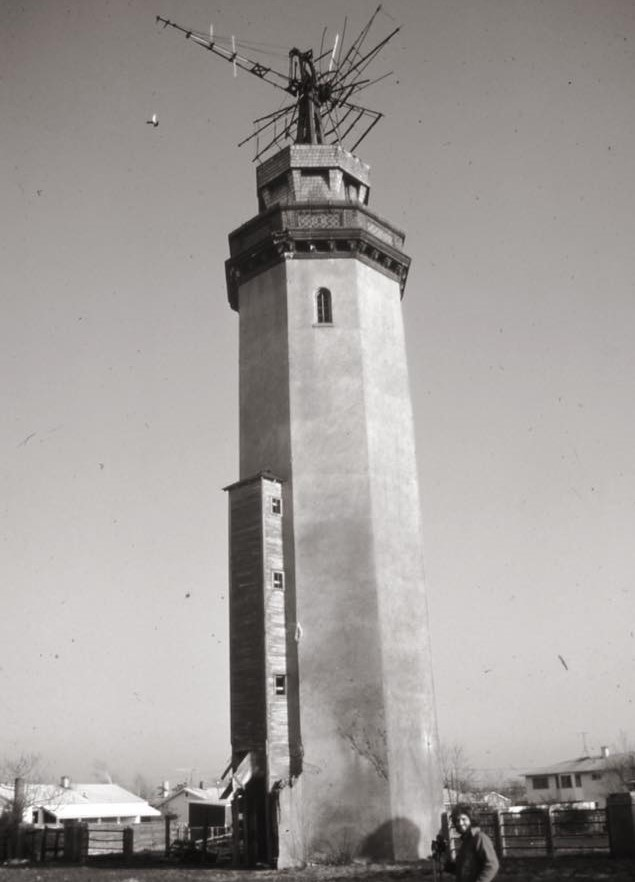
- View of the Bourne Windmill 1975
- Interactive map of Bourne Windmill

Origin
- Mill name: Bourne Windmill
- Mill location: Oakdale, New York
- Coordinates: 40°44′15″N 73°06′15″W
- Year built: 1911

Information
- Purpose: Water supply
- Type: American Farm
- Year lost: 2004

The Bourne Windmill, Oakdale, New York was an American farm design tower windmill, built in 1911 by Commodore Frederic G Bourne, as part of a farm in Oakdale, New York. It was located north of his South Shore estate, known as Indian Neck Hall, which later became LaSalle Military Academy. The windmill was demolished in 2004–2005.

== History ==
The Bourne Windmill was built in 1911 by Frederick Gilbert "Commodore" Bourne, and designed by noted architect Alfred Hopkins. Part of the Bourne Dairy Farm, the windmill works were built by the Andrew J. Corcoran Company and supplied water for the dairy farm, farmhouse, fountains and fire hydrants. It was noteworthy in its height, construction and artistic design. The windmill blades were 30 feet in diameter, the tower stood 105 feet tall and was adorned with terracotta ram's heads encircling the top of the top of the tower. It featured a unique octagonal design constructed of reinforced concrete pillars with terracotta blocks between, and smooth stucco on the exterior. The upper portion of the tower housed a large metal water tank and the lower portion was used as a silo. By the 1970s, the surrounding farm buildings fell into disrepair, damaged by neglect and vandalism and were demolished around 1975. The farm and the windmill had applications to be designated a National Landmark that was unsuccessful. The windmill continued to be neglected through the 1980s becoming a home to bats and owls and a spooky hangout for local teenagers. In 1989, the surrounding property was redeveloped as an age-restricted residential community and the windmill underwent a garish cosmetic makeover. The top was retrofitted with a barn roof and faux Dutch-style blades replacing the original American farm design. The tower exterior was painted pastel yellow to match the vinyl siding of the surrounding homes. It was eventually demolished in 2004–2005 after engineering reports estimated the cost of maintaining the structure to be too expensive despite its status as a local historic site.

== See also ==
- List of windmills in New York
