= Isaac Edge's Windmill =

Historic landmark in Jersey City, New Jersey, US

Great Western Mill
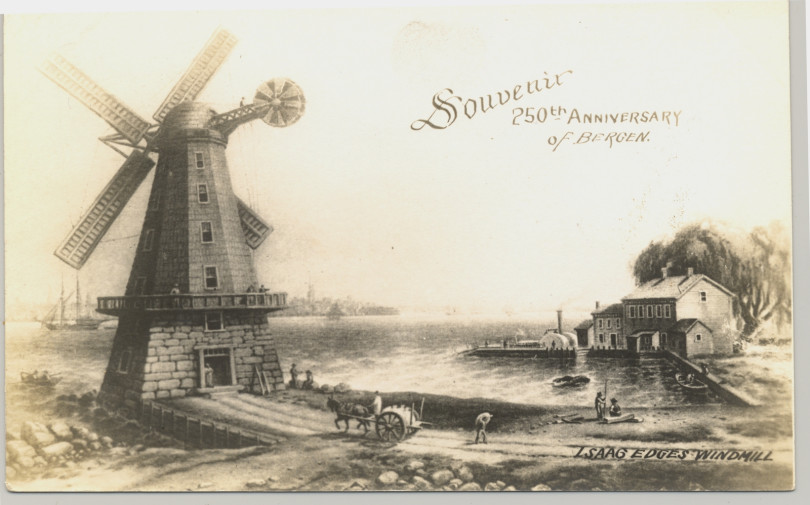
- Promotional postcard (1910).
- Interactive map of Great Western Mill

Origin
- Coordinates: 40.7166°N 74.0357°W
- Operator: Isaac Edge
- Year built: 1815

Information
- Purpose: Grist
- Type: Smock mill
- Storeys: 4
- Base storeys: 7
- Smock sides: 8
- No. of sails: 4
- Type of sails: Canvas, later converted to iron
- Auxiliary power: Steam
- Year lost: 1870

Isaac Edge's windmill is a historic landmark that played an important role in the early industrial development of Jersey City, New Jersey. Isaac Edge, a British immigrant, built the windmill in 1806 on the shore of the Hudson River, the Great Western Mill stones imported from England found their first home in Brooklyn Heights. Later the smock mill relocated to Paulus Hook just north of the present-day corner of Montgomery and Greene streets in Jersey City, New Jersey.

== History ==
The Great Western Mill of Southold, Long Island is a Smock Windmill that was originally constructed in Brooklyn Heights in 1806 and then moved to Jersey City before being purchased by Hampton Young and others.

The windmill was a four-story structure that used wind power to grind grain into flour. The millstones and machinery used in the mill were imported from England, reflecting the technology of the time.

Isaac Edge was an industrious man who built a successful business around his windmill in Jersey City. He purchased waterfront property near the present-day Exchange Place from the Associates of the Jersey Company and hired the Burmley and Oakes millwright firm to construct a seven-story octagonal brownstone tower on a 100 ft (30 m)-long pier, for a foundation that jutted out into the Hudson River. The windmill was completed in 1815 and became a landmark for ships approaching the Hudson River from the Upper Bay.

Edge's efficient business practices and quality milling process attracted customers from a wide area. Farmers from as far south as Bergen Point, northern parts of Bergen County, Manhattan, Staten Island, and Long Island brought their grain to be processed at the mill. Edge also ran a bakery at the southwest corner of Greene and York streets.

== Iron Sails ==
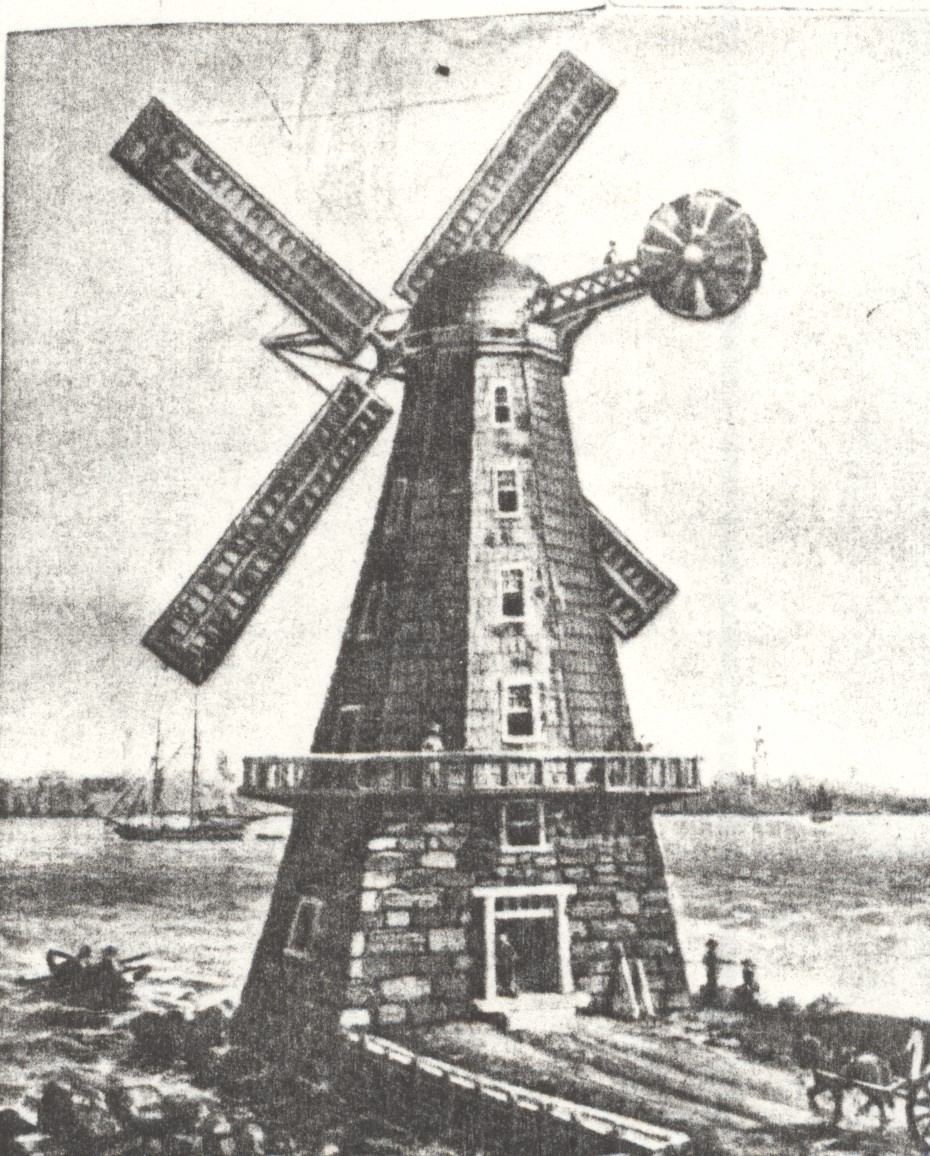
Reprd. The Great Western Windmill was built by Isaac Edge (1777-1851)

The Great Western Mill was a prominent structure that dominated the surrounding area. It had iron sails and a machine for hoisting grain and returning flour. However, after the iron sails were damaged by a strong wind, canvas sails were used instead. The mill was run by various owners over the years and had a building attached to the north side in 1846 where a steam engine was installed. The engine was soon abandoned due to its high fuel consumption.

In 1821, a storm destroyed the canvas fans on the mill's wings. Edge replaced them with iron sails and rebuilt the dock damaged by the storm. However, in 1839, the New Jersey Railroad and Transportation Co. purchased Edge's property and covered the pier with landfill to build its terminal at Exchange Place.

Hampton Young, Ira Corwin, George W. Phillips, and Giles Wells of Southold in 1839 bid and acquired the mill. They had it dismantled and transported to Southold Harbor where it was reassembled on the George W. Phillips lot on Pine Neck Road.

== 1840 Move to Southold ==
In 1839, the property was purchased by a railroad company, The mill was dismantled, parts labeled, and then shipped and reassembled at Mill Hill in Southold, Long Island.

The Great Western Mill was a significant feature of the landscape on the George W. Phillips lot, located a short distance east of Mill Hill (now known as Willow Hill). The mill was unique in that its sails were made of iron, which was a departure from the traditional wooden sails that were commonly used in windmills of the time. Additionally, the mill was equipped with a machine for hoisting grain and returning flour, which was an innovative feature that improved the efficiency of the milling process. However, despite its innovative design, the Great Western Mill experienced some setbacks. At one point, the machinery for turning the dome was disconnected for repairs, and during this time, a strong wind came up and caused the arms to whirl uncontrollably. As a result, one of the arms broke, and the iron sails were badly damaged. After this incident, the mill switched to using canvas sails, which were more durable and better suited to withstand strong winds.

Despite these setbacks, the Great Western Mill remained in operation for many years, under the management of various owners. Hampton Young ran the mill for a significant period, and later it was run by Phillips. The mill continued to operate until it was destroyed by fire on June 25, 1870. The windmill was in operation for many years, and old mill records indicate that in 1812, flour was selling for as much as $18 a barrel, which was a significant amount of money at the time. Today, the site of the windmill is marked by a plaque that commemorates its historic significance. Despite its short lifespan in Jersey City, Isaac Edge's windmill remains an important reminder of the city's early industrial heritage.
