= John Lyon Gardiner Mill Cottage =

- U.S. Historic district – Contributing property
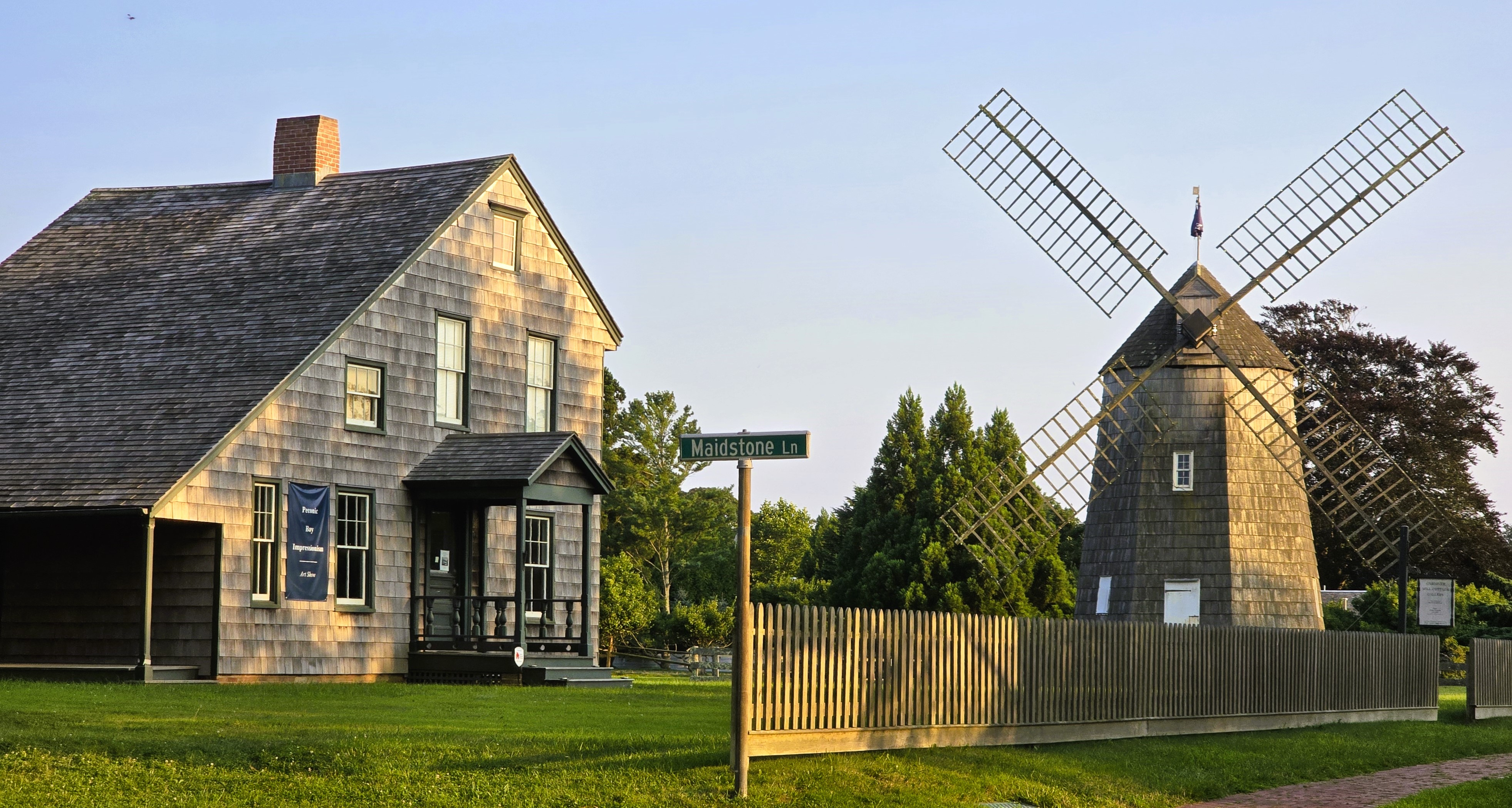
- Gardiner Cottage and Mill in 2024

- Location within New York Location within the United States
- Location: 36 James Lane, East Hampton, New York
- Coordinates: 40.955354°N 72.191924°W
- Architect: John Lyon Gardiner
- Part of: East Hampton Village District (ID74001309)
- Designated CP: May 2, 1974

The mill cottage on the Lion Gardiner farm at 36 James Lane on the landmarked East Hampton Village green has become a museum displaying 19th and early-20th-century landscape paintings. It is a contributing structure on the NRHP East Hampton Village District, replacing the original cottage on the lot situated with the windmill and Rev James historic marker.

== History ==
By community request of the village board, the Town of East Hampton purchased the Gardiner Mill cottage and lot, which included the 1804 Gardiner windmill, in 2014 utilizing community preservation funding. In December 2014, the village signed off on an agreement to build a replica saltbox style colonial era home and took sole responsibility for a museum. Terry Wallace, owner of the East Hampton Wallace Gallery had agreed to partly donate some of his collection of landscape paintings of the Hamptons (some dating to 1865), while the rest would be acquired by a sizable endowment to the museum funded by the Robert David Lion Gardiner Foundation.

== Cottage ==
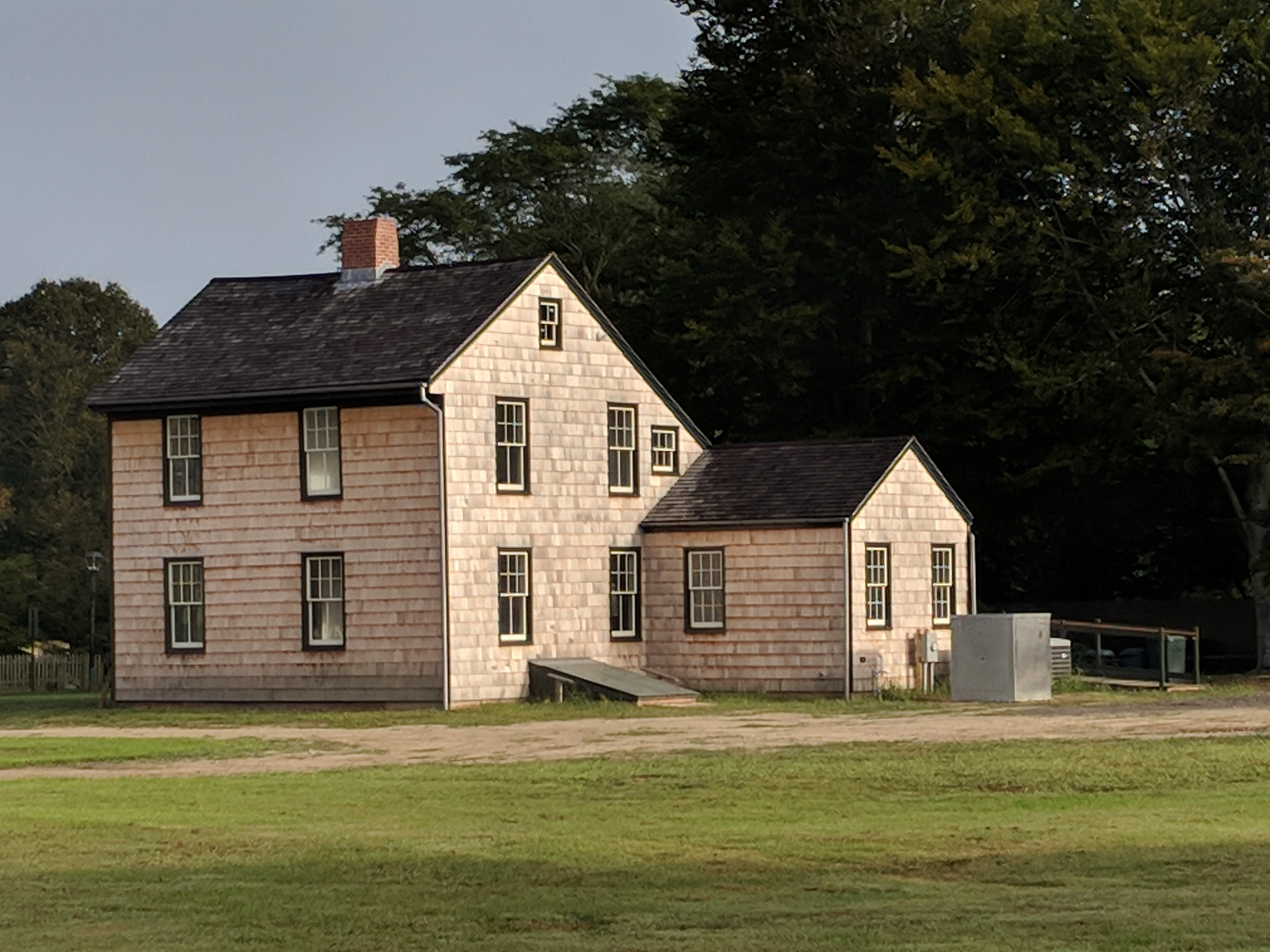
John Lyon Gardiner Mill Cottage in 2018

The mill cottage and later added extensions and dormers is a colonial-era timber-frame saltbox. It was restored to its 1880s appearance, when it was last renovated by Jonathan Thompson Gardiner. The artist Percy Moran, a nephew of renowned artist Thomas Moran of the Hudson River School of painting, lived there in the early-20th century and the cottage had fallen into dis-repair. The decision to replace the structure with a replica was cast as a compromise to restoration. Some nonhistorical add-ons to the original cottage, including porches and dormers, were removed, and the 1880 front porch was reconstructed. A previous kitchen would be recreated to provide an entrance and bathroom to comply with the Americans With Disabilities Act. A small parking lot was placed behind the cottage so as to not impede street views.

== Mill ==
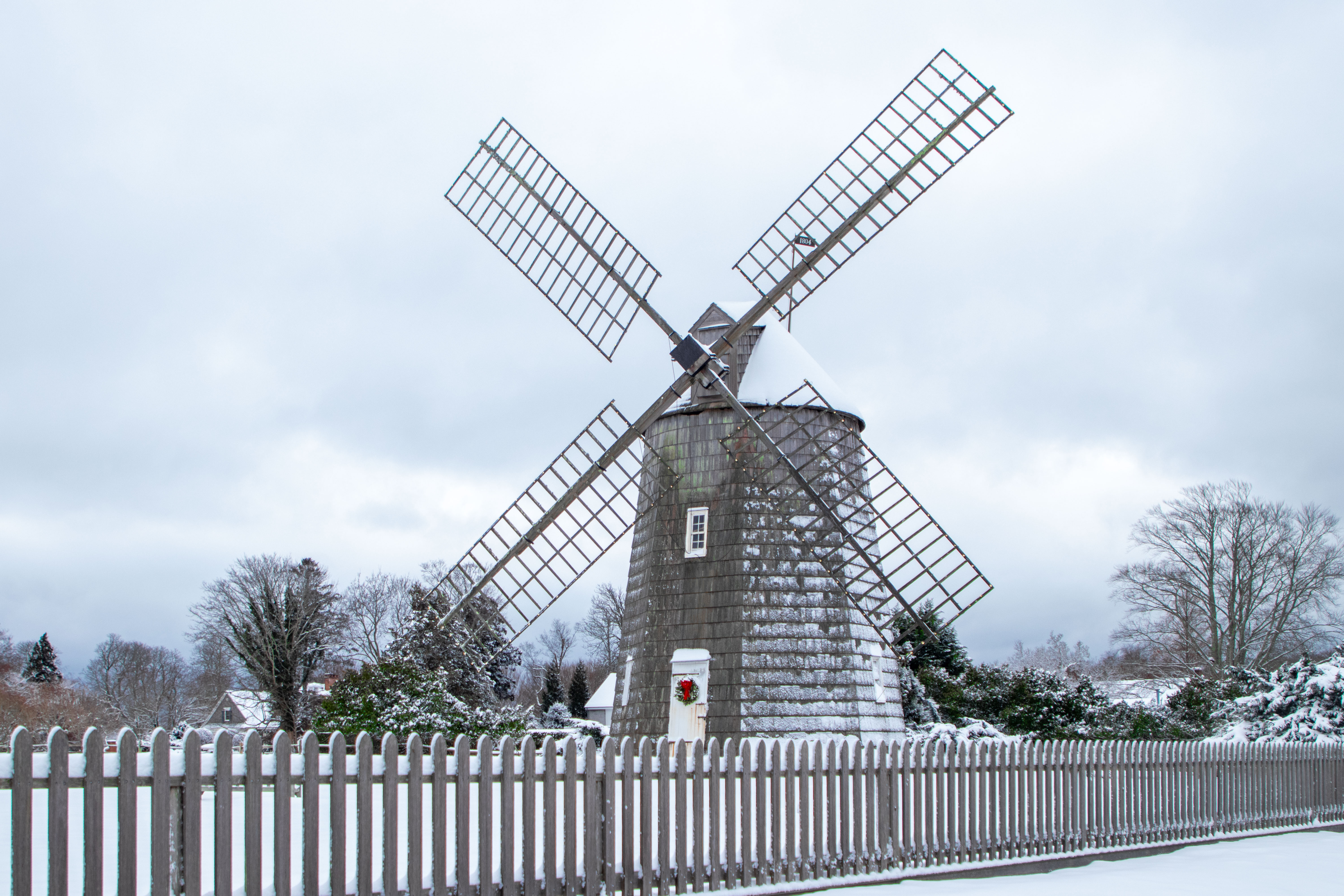
Gardiners Windmill in 2025

The Gardiner Mill, built in 1804, is a New England style smock windmill built by Millwright Nathanial Dominy V. and operated as a grist mill serving area farmers. The timber used for the mill was cut from trees on Gardiner's Island and it was finished on September 28, 1804, costing more than 528 pounds ($28,208 in 2018). The mill continued to operate until 1900 and retained much of its original machinery, it has the best representation of colonial style interior finish of the extant Long Island windmills and remains the best example of millwrighting craftsmanship by Nathaniel Dominy V, who also worked on other area windmills. Nathaniel Dominy is said to have given particular attention to detail in the workings of the Gardiner Mill frame and had worked the timbers to a smooth finish with a hand plane. Dominy made this extra effort partly due to this being the first of a kind, a new model windmill which was crafted to run two sets of millstones instead of one, and also because he built it for his major patron, John Lyon Gardiner. It was completely renovated in 1996 by the Village which created a state-of-the-art restoration of the Windmill.

== See also ==
- List of windmills in New York
