= Hayground Windmill =

- U.S. National Register of Historic Places
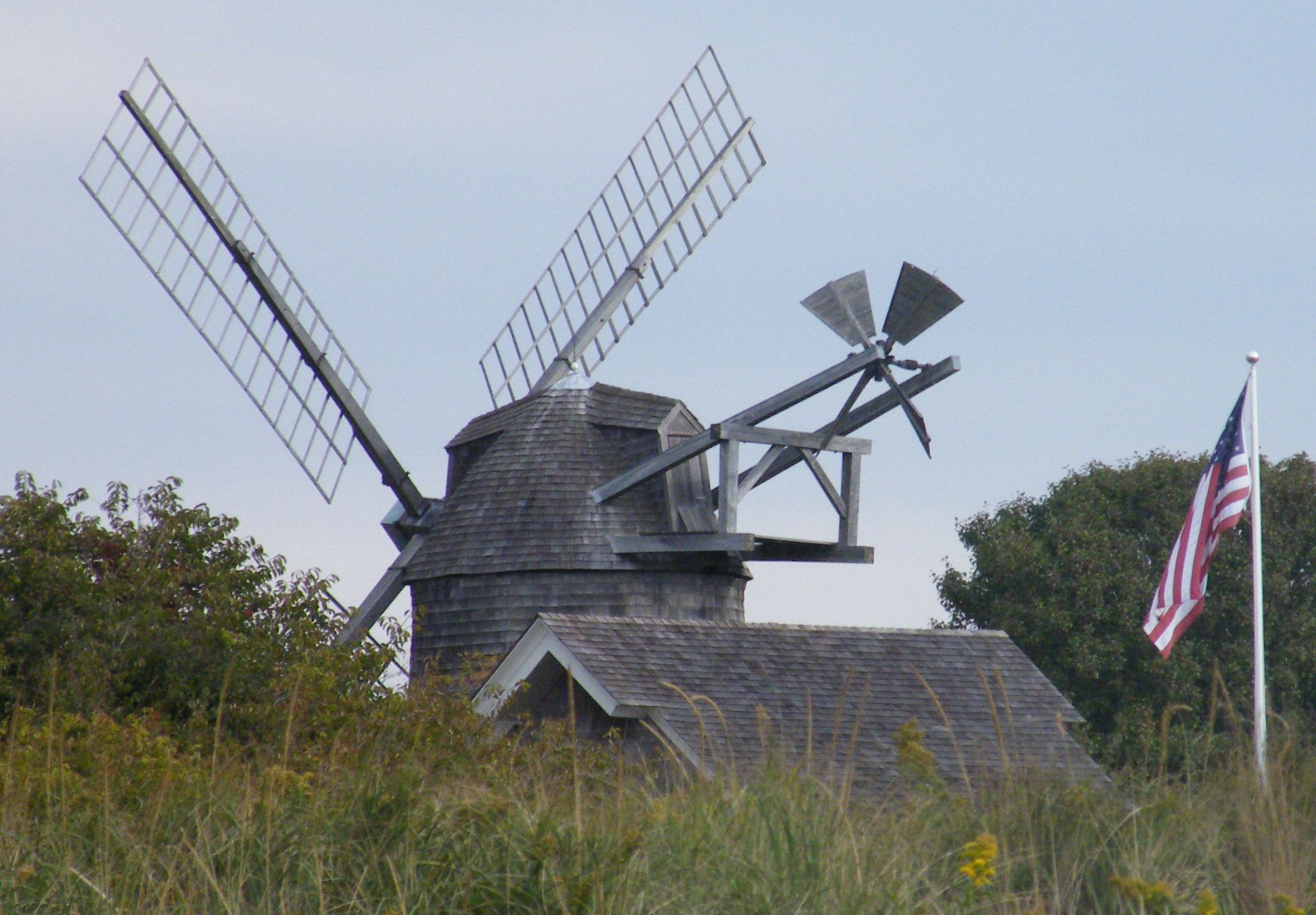

- Location within New York Location within the United States
- Location: East Hampton Village, New York, USA
- Coordinates: 40°57′17″N 72°9′57″W
- Area: 0 acres (0 ha)
- Built: 1801
- MPS: Long Island Wind and Tide Mills TR
- NRHP reference No.: 78001913
- Added to NRHP: December 27, 1978

Hayground Windmill is an historic windmill at Windmill Lane in East Hampton Village, New York. It was moved from Hayground to Pantigo between Two Mile Hollow Beach and Egypt Beach in the 1950s.

== Early history ==
The windmill was built in 1809 and was added to the National Historic Register in 1978.

Still retaining its internal machinery, this windmill is unusual for Long Island, in that it has a fantail to turn the sails into the wind. The Hayground Windmill, in 1984, was one of eleven surviving 18th and early 19th century wind-powered gristmills on Long Island. It was also the busiest, turning out more bushels than nearby windmills. Open seasonally, it operated 4 months of the year, turning out in 1870 800 bushels of wheat, 800 of oats and 400 of corn.

It was in Haye Ground, an early part of Bridgehampton on the main Montauk Highway going to Watermill. The Hayground Windmill stood on the old triangular commons at the center of the village of Hayground, midway between Bridgehampton and Water Hill. This was the only mill in Hayground through the 19th century and serviced the village and surrounding countryside. The mill operated into the 20th century; by 1912 it was grinding just corn and feed during the summer months. In its last year of operation (1919) the Hayground Mill was the only windmill on Long Island still running.

Mary Pickford Starred in 'Huldah for Holland', a 1919 movie which also featured a descendant of an original shareholder, Malby B. Rose and a bunch of tulips playing Captain Rose in the production with the mill featured.

After 1919 the mill was used variously as a tea room and artist's studio, notably by Agnes Pelton, who moved into it in 1921 and painted the first of her spiritual abstracts within it in 1926. In 1950 Robert Dowling purchased the windmill and moved it to his estate on the dunes in East Hampton where it was a decorative motif. He also moved to the site a 1737 Amagansett two-story shingle house, a 1751 saltbox home from Springs, and a Cape Cod house (ca. 1778) called "Summer Wind' from East Hampton.

== 1950s move ==
In 1950 it was purchased by Robert Dowling and he moved it to his estate on the dunes by bulldozer along the beach. Many of the east end windmills were moved in this fashion, they were first dis-assembled and moved to where stones were set to perch them on, later on these stones were replaced by foundations.

== See also ==
- List of windmills in New York

== Gallery ==
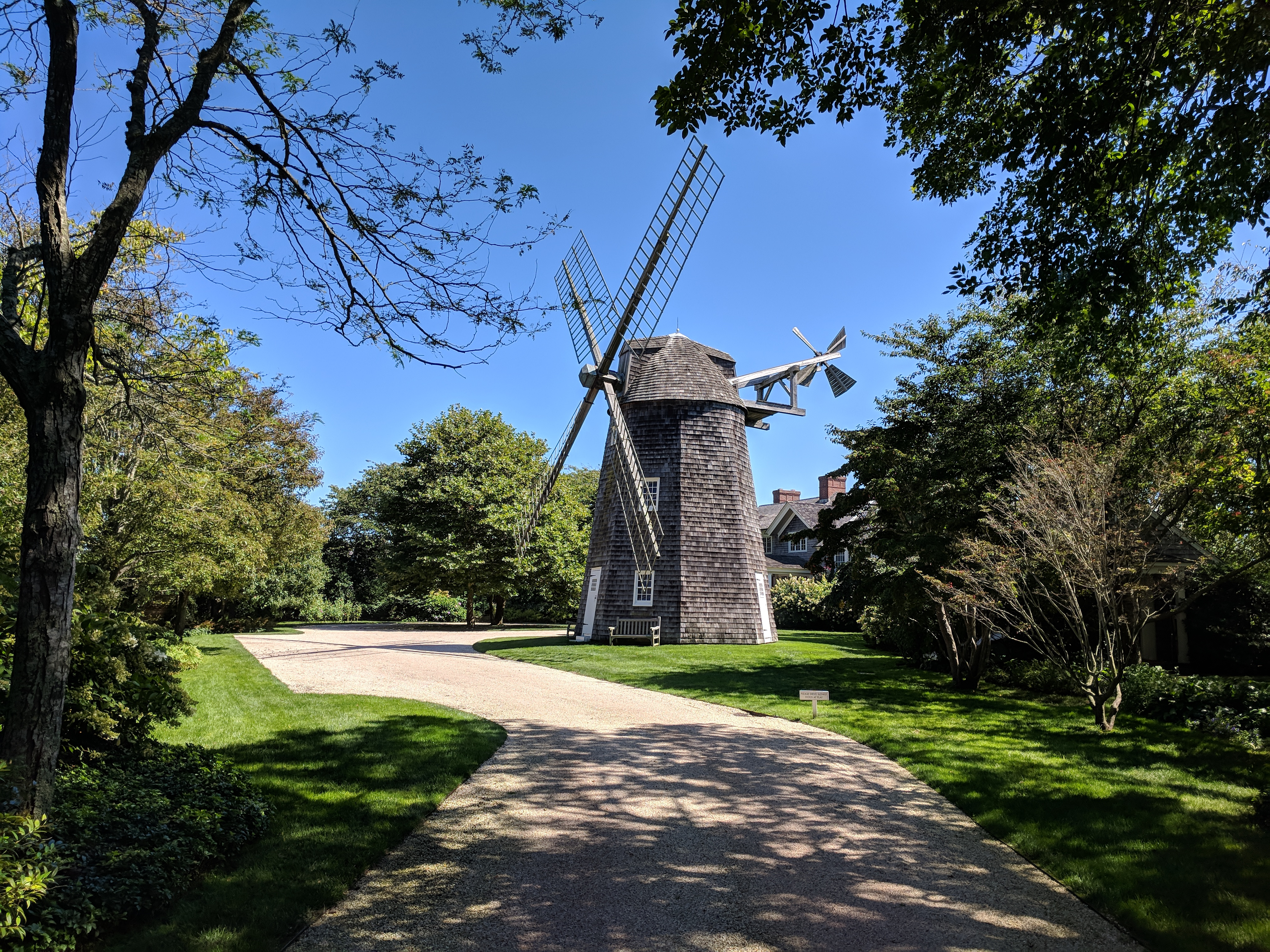

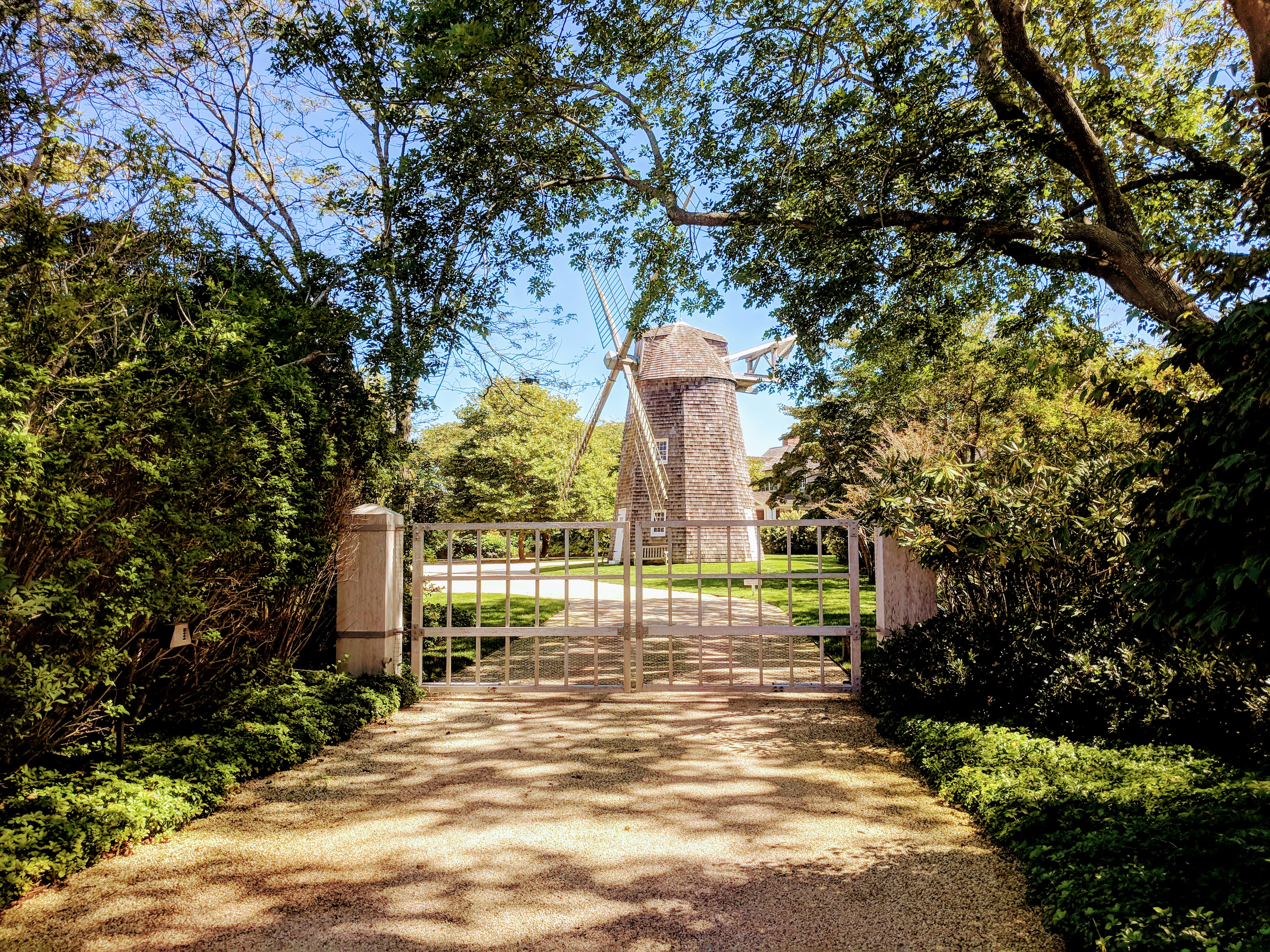
Originally at Hayground off Montauk Hgwy, between Bridgehampton and Water Mill, it was moved in 1950 to the dune estate of Robert Dowling. Hidden by houses and trees, it is not accessible within the gated compound on Windmill lane.
