= National Register of Historic Places listings in Southampton (town), New York =

This list is intended to provide a comprehensive listing of entries in the National Register of Historic Places in the Town of Southampton, New York. The locations of National Register properties for which the latitude and longitude coordinates are included below, may be seen in an online map.

== Current listings ==
	Name on the Register	Image	Date listed	Location	City or town	Description
1	Balcastle	Balcastle	October 2, 1986 (#86002722)	NW corner of Herrick and Little Plains Roads; 40°53′02″N 72°23′04″W	Southampton	
2	Beach Road Historic District	Beach Road Historic District	October 2, 1986 (#86002723)	Between Shinnecock and Halsely Neck Roads on Beach Road at Barrier Beach; 40°51′44″N 72°25′03″W	Southampton	
3	Beebe Windmill	Beebe Windmill	December 27, 1978 (#78001918)	SE corner of Ocean Road and Hildreth Avenue; 40°56′03″N 72°18′05″W	Bridgehampton	
4	James Benjamin Homestead	James Benjamin Homestead	August 13, 1986 (#86001510)	1182 Flanders Road; 40°54′11″N 72°37′04″W	Flanders	
5	The Big Duck	The Big Duck	April 28, 1997 (#97000164)	NY 24, NW of jct. with Bellows Pond Road, Town of Southampton; 40°54′25″N 72°37′20″W	Flanders	Moved two miles northwest of previous location in 2007
6	Big Duck Ranch	Big Duck Ranch	September 12, 2008 (#08000866)	1012 NY 24; 40°54′27″N 72°37′23″W	Flanders	Also called the Maurer Duck Farm; Used for The Big Duck (see above), after nearly several moves along Flanders Road
7	Dr. Wesley Bowers House		October 2, 1986 (#86002699)	Beach Road (just west of "Road C"); 40°51′19″N 72°26′01″W	Southampton	
8	James L. Breese House	James L. Breese House	April 18, 1980 (#80002778)	155 Hill Street; 40°53′06″N 72°23′56″W	Southampton	
9	Bridgehampton Presbyterian Church	Bridgehampton Presbyterian Church	February 14, 2017 (#100000649)	2429 Montauk Hwy. 40°56′10″N 72°18′12″W	Bridgehampton	
10	William Cauldwell House		May 4, 2009 (#09000305)	51 Peconic Avenue; 40°59′24″N 72°22′21″W	Noyack	
11	William Merritt Chase Homestead	William Merritt Chase Homestead	June 16, 1983 (#83001808)	Canoe Place Road and Bathing Beach Road (east of Peconic Road); 40°53′15″N 72°28′38″W	Shinnecock Hills	
12	COIMBRA (shipwreck and remains)		September 25, 2013 (#13000779)	Address Restricted	Westhampton	From World War II Shipwrecks along the East Coast and Gulf of Mexico MPS
13	Corwith-Jones Farmhouse		December 10, 2025 (#100012370)	248 Newlight Lane; 40°55′20″N 72°19′24″W	Southampton	
14	William Corwith House	William Corwith House	July 13, 2013 (#13000463)	2368 Montauk Hwy. 40°56′10″N 72°18′21″W	Bridgehampton	Currently the headquarters of the Bridgehampton Historical Society
15	Crowther House	Crowther House	March 21, 1985 (#85000630)	97 Beach Lane; 40°48′16″N 72°38′03″W	Westhampton Beach	
16	William A. Farnum Boathouse	William A. Farnum Boathouse	November 9, 2017 (#100001809)	52 Actor's Colony Rd. 41°02′08″N 72°18′26″W	Sag Harbor	1915 boathouse is sole surviving intact structure associated with the life of early 20th century movie star William Farnum
17	First Presbyterian Church	First Presbyterian Church	April 19, 1994 (#94001194)	44 Union Street; 40°59′50″N 72°17′39″W	Sag Harbor	Egyptian revival church designed by Minard Lafever; steeple lost in 1938 hurricane
18	Foster-Meeker House	Foster-Meeker House	August 26, 2009 (#09000656)	101 Mill Road; 40°48′44″N 72°38′36″W	Westhampton Beach	
19	Capt. C. Goodale House	Capt. C. Goodale House	October 2, 1986 (#86002725)	300 Hampton Road; 40°53′29″N 72°22′51″W	Southampton	
20	Jagger House	Jagger House	December 12, 1978 (#78001920)	Old Montauk Highway; 40°49′00″N 72°40′38″W	Westhampton	
21	Maycroft		February 24, 1995 (#95000158)	Ferry Road (NY 114); 41°00′33″N 72°18′35″W	North Haven	
22	North Main Street Historic District	North Main Street Historic District	October 2, 1986 (#86002730)	North Main Street near CR 39 and Railroad Station Plaza; 40°53′45″N 72°23′27″W	Southampton	
23	Quogue Cemetery		December 11, 2013 (#13000914)	58 Lamb Ave; 40°49′01″N 72°36′18″W	Quogue	Graves of early settlers date to mid-18th century, with distinctive period funerary art.
24	Quogue Historic District	Quogue Historic District	February 2, 2016 (#15001028)	Quogue Historic District; 40°49′07″N 72°36′15″W	Quogue	District covering most of village shows slow transition from agricultural town to seaside vacation destination.
25	Quogue Life-Saving Station	Quogue Life-Saving Station	May 27, 1999 (#99000640)	78 Dune Road; 40°48′26″N 72°36′00″W	Quogue	
26	Rev. Paul Cuffee Gravesite	Rev. Paul Cuffee Gravesite	October 8, 2010 (#10000852)	North side of Montauk Highway opposite 216 East Montauk Highway; 40°52′56″N 72°30′39″W	Hampton Bays	Cemeteries of the Town of Southampton, 1640-1930 MPS
27	Rogers Mansion Museum Complex	Rogers Mansion Museum Complex	January 10, 2012 (#11001010)	17 Meeting House Ln. 40°53′05″N 72°23′19″W	Southampton	1843 Greek Revival mansion built for whaling captain; now used as the Southampton History Museums
28	Nathaniel Rogers House	Nathaniel Rogers House	March 15, 2005 (#05000170)	2539 Montauk Highway; 40°56′15″N 72°18′04″W	Bridgehampton	
29	Rosemary Lodge	Rosemary Lodge	January 14, 2000 (#99001681)	322 Rose Hill Road; 40°54′39″N 72°20′19″W	Water Mill	
30	Sag Harbor Village District	Sag Harbor Village District	July 20, 1973 (#73001274)	Roughly bounded by Sag Harbor, Rysam, Hamilton, Marsden, Main and Long Island Avenues; 40°59′50″N 72°17′44″W	Sag Harbor	
31	Sagaponack Historic District	Sagaponack Historic District	June 2, 2000 (#00000582)	Roughly along Main Street; 40°55′29″N 72°16′40″W	Sagaponack	
32	Shinnecock Hills Golf Club	Shinnecock Hills Golf Club	September 29, 2000 (#00001211)	Between County Road and Sebonac Road; 40°53′46″N 72°26′28″W	Southampton	
33	Southampton Village Historic District	Southampton Village Historic District	April 25, 1988 (#86002726)	Roughly bounded by Hill and Main Streets, Old Town Road, Atlantic Ocean, Coopers Neck and Halsey Neck Lanes; 40°52′37″N 72°23′35″W	Southampton	
34	Ellis Squires Jr. House	Ellis Squires Jr. House	November 9, 2017 (#100001811)	186 and 190 Newtown Rd. 40°53′48″N 72°31′35″W	Hampton Bays	1785 Federal style building is oldest surviving house in Hampton Bays
35	John Steinbeck Cottage		August 11, 2025 (#100012103)	2 Bluff Point Lane; 40°59′37″N 72°18′29″W	Sag Harbor	
36	US Post Office-Westhampton Beach	US Post Office-Westhampton Beach	May 11, 1989 (#88002446)	170 Main Street; 40°48′36″N 72°38′28″W	Westhampton Beach	
37	Water Mill	Water Mill	October 13, 1983 (#83004175)	Old Mill Road; 40°54′33″N 72°21′24″W	Water Mill	
38	Wickapogue Road Historic District	Wickapogue Road Historic District	October 2, 1986 (#86002697)	Wickapogue Road between Narrow Lane and Cobb Road; 40°53′01″N 72°22′03″W	Southampton	
39	Windmill at Water Mill	Windmill at Water Mill	December 27, 1978 (#78001919)	NY 27 and Halsey Lane; 40°54′34″N 72°21′15″W	Water Mill	

== Former listing ==
	Name on the Register	Image	Date listed	Date removed	Location	Description
1	Captain Mercator Cooper House	Captain Mercator Cooper House	October 2, 1986 (#86002724)	January 15, 1987	81 Windmill Lane	

== See also ==
- National Register of Historic Places listings in New York
- National Register of Historic Places listings in Suffolk County, New York
