= Esé Azénabor-Grembowski =

Nigerian-Canadian fashion designer and creative director (born 1984)

Esé Azénabor
- Born: January 20, 1984 (age 42); Benin City, Nigeria
- Education: University of Windsor; Southern Methodist University
- Occupations: Fashion Designer, Creative Director
- Years active: 2012–present
- Spouse: Eric Grembowski
- Children: 2
- Website: www.eseazenabor.com

Esé Azénabor-Grembowski (born January 20, 1984) is a Nigerian-Canadian fashion designer and creative director. She is known for her label Esé Azénabor, which combines African-heritage inspiraion with contemporary European elements in haute couture and bridal designs.

== Early life and education ==
Azénabor-Grembowski was born in Nigeria and moved to Ontario, Canada, in 1997, where she studied accounting at the University of Windsor. She later relocated to Dallas, Texas in 2011 to pursue a Master's degree from Southern Methodist University.

== Career ==
In 2012 Azénabor founded her fashion label, Esé Azénabor, specializing in couture bridal and evening wear. Her use of hand-beading, fine fabrics, and intricate embroidery quickly drew attention, establishing her as a unique voice in fashion. Known for combining African and European influences, her designs feature detailed craftsmanship that has helped her stand out in the competitive couture industry. Her collections, which include beadwork, French lace, tulle, and crystal embellishments, attracted an affluent clientele interested in unique bridal gowns and formal wear.

Azénabor debuted her work at a Dallas fashion show, where she gained support from local influencer Rhonda Sargent Chambers. Her designs were featured in the 2022 film Father of the Bride, alongside works by designers Vera Wang and Zuhair Murad.

Azénabor’s designs have appeared at New York Fashion Week (NYFW) and Bridal Fashion Week.

Her work has been featured in various publications, including Vogue, The New York Times, Brides, WWD, Essence, Forbes, and Harper’s Bazaar. Several celebrities, including Taraji P. Henson, Tyra Banks, Little Big Town, Kelsea Ballerini, Vivica A. Fox, and Thalía, have worn her designs.

=== Notable Collections ===
- In Bloom Collection
- In Blossom Collection
- Essence Bridal Collection: This collection debuted at New York Bridal Fashion Week.
- The Enchanted Collection
- The Dream Collection
- Grand Cathedral Bridal Collection: Released during the COVID-19 pandemic, this collection became one of Azénabor’s most celebrated works.
- Spring/Summer 2025 Collection: Showcased during New York Fashion Week, this collection is heavily inspired by a mix of modern and vintage elements, presenting gowns with intricate hand-beading and embroidery.

=== Design Philosophy and Style ===
Esé Azénabor's designs feature dramatic silhouettes, hand beading with crystals, pearls, and stones, and embroidery on fabrics such as French lace and tulle. Her collections draw inspiration from vintage, African, and contemporary European styles, emphasizing bespoke gown creation tailored to individual preferences.

Known for luxurious, art-inspired couture, Azénabor’s pieces often include hand-beading, crystal and pearl embellishments, and complex structuring. Drawing inspiration from African culture and European design, her gowns are distinguished by their elaborate detail and bold silhouettes. She frequently works with fine, detailed materials, such as French lace and embroidered fabrics.

=== Showrooms ===
Esé Azénabor’s flagship showroom is located in Dallas, Texas, where she launched her brand. In 2023, she expanded with a bridal showroom on Madison Avenue in New York City and a ready-to-wear boutique in Southampton Village. That same year, she showcased her latest collections at a private event in Dallas, marking a return to live fashion shows.

== Personal life ==
Esé Azénabor-Grembowski is married to Eric Grembowski and has a daughter and son.

== See also ==
- Fashion Design
- Haute Couture
- New York Fashion Week
- List of Fashion Designers
