= George Richard Schieffelin =

American lawyer

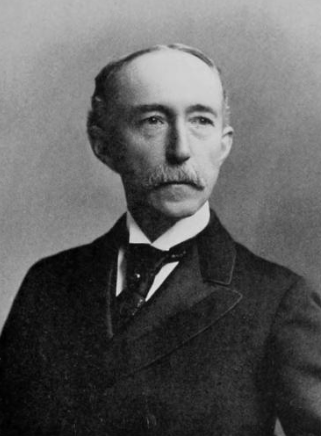
- Born: July 27, 1836; New York City, U.S.
- Died: October 24, 1910 (aged 74); New York City, U.S.
- Education: Columbia College
- Occupation: Lawyer
- Spouse: Julie Matilda Delaplaine (m. 1866)
- Children: 5
- Parent(s): Richard Lawrence Schieffelin; Margaret Helen McKay Schieffelin

George Richard Schieffelin (July 27, 1836 – October 24, 1910) was an American lawyer.

== Early life ==
George Richard Schieffelin was born in New York City, the first son of Richard Lawrence Schieffelin and Margaret Helen McKay Schieffelin.

== Personal life ==
George Richard Schieffelin married Julie Matilda Delaplaine (1840–1915) in 1866.

Julie (French for Julia) was the granddaughter of the merchant John Ferris Delaplaine (1786–1854) and daughter of Isaac Clason Delaplaine (1817–1866). Isaac C. Delaplaine was a Democratic congressman in the House of Representatives. The Huguenot "de la Plaine" family came from Bressuire, Poitou-Charentes, southeast of Nantes in France. Nicholas de la Plaine had fled to New York in 1657.

The couple had five children: Julia Florence, Margaret Helen, Matilda Constance, Sarah Dorothy, and George Richard Delaplaine. Two of their daughters married the Ismay brothers from England.

- Julia Florence Schieffelin (1867–1963) married Joseph Bruce Ismay (1862–1937) from Liverpool, England, in 1888.
- Margaret Helen Schieffelin (1870–1949) married Henry Graff Trevor.
- Sarah Dorothy Schieffelin (1875-1945)
- Matilda Constance Schieffelin (1877–1963) married Charles Bower Ismay.
- George Richard Delaplaine Schieffelin (1884–1950) married Louise Scribner, daughter of Charles Scribner II.

== Career ==
George Richard Schieffelin, like his father, studied law at Columbia College in Manhattan, graduating in 1855. One of his teachers was Augustus Schell. George Richard spent three years studying under Schell in his office, before branching into his own business, becoming a well-known New York lawyer.

== Committee work and social commitment ==
- Member of the General Society of the War of 1812
- Secretary of the New York Historical Society
- Warden of St. Mary's church in Manhattanville (his grandparents donated money and a plot of land for the construction of St. Mary's church)
- Member of the Century Association (1893–1910)
- President of the Southampton Club.
- Vestryman and treasurer of St. Andrew's Dune Church, Southampton
- Legal adviser for the New York City Mission Society

== Bonnie Brae in Southampton, NY ==
In 1880, George Richard Schieffelin became one of the founders of the New Southampton, Long Island holiday resort. His parents had built the Bonnie Brae ("Pleasant Hill") holiday home south of Southampton, which George Richard had inherited. George Richard was president of the Village Improvement Association of Southampton (VIAS), which was responsible for the development and maintenance of the holiday village.
