= West Hampton Dunes, New York =

- Village
- Incorporated Village of West Hampton Dunes
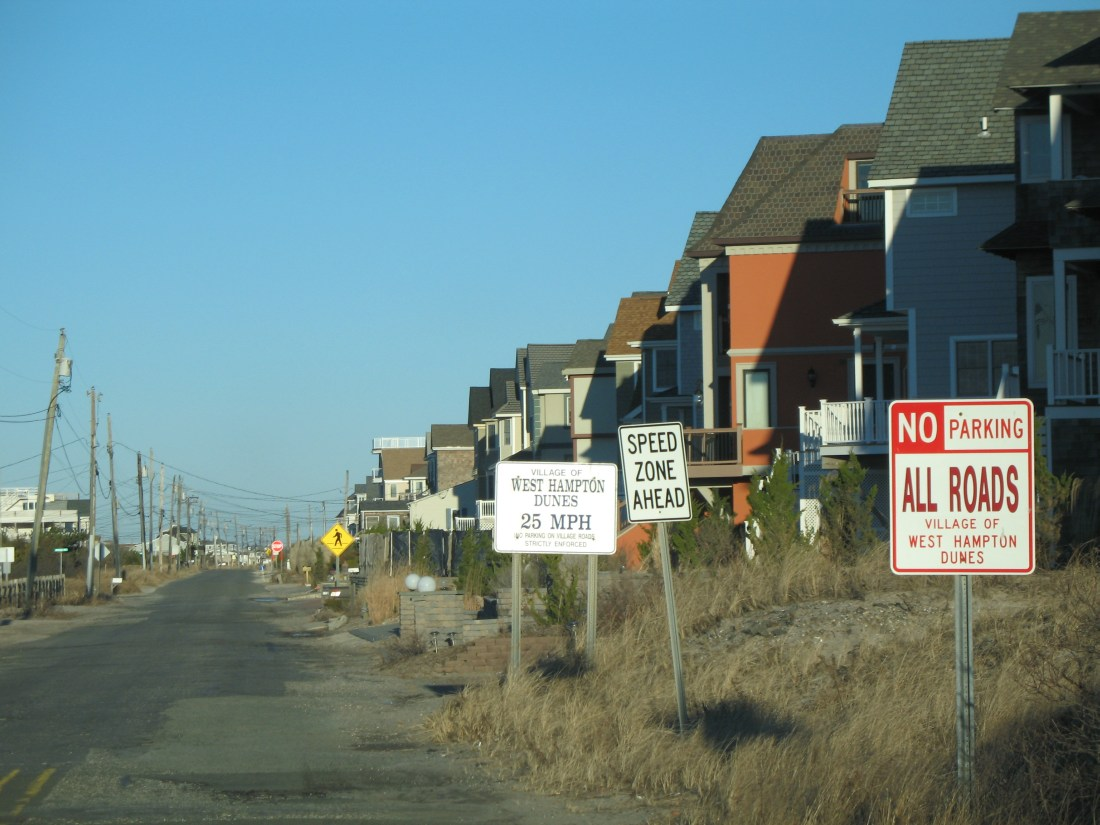
- Houses on the ocean in West Hampton Dunes (c. 2000)

- Location within Suffolk County and the state of New York.

- Location within New York
- Coordinates: 40°46′30″N 72°43′3″W
- Country: United States
- State: New York
- County: Suffolk
- Town: Southampton
- Incorporated: 1993

Government
  - Mayor: Irwin R. Krasnow

Area
  - Total: 0.37 sq mi (0.95 km^{2})
  - Land: 0.31 sq mi (0.81 km^{2})
  - Water: 0.054 sq mi (0.14 km^{2})
- Elevation: 6.6 ft (2 m)

Population (2020)
  - Total: 126
  - Density: 402.9/sq mi (155.55/km^{2})
- Time zone: UTC-5 (Eastern (EST))
  - Summer (DST): UTC-4 (EDT)
- ZIP code: 11978
- Area codes: 631, 934
- FIPS code: 36-80186
- GNIS feature ID: 0979943
- Website: whdunes.gov

West Hampton Dunes is an incorporated village in the Town of Southampton on Westhampton Island, in Suffolk County, New York, United States. Located off the South Shore of Long Island, the village's population was 126 at the time of the 2020 census.

== History ==
West Hampton Dunes is located on a barrier island in the Town of Southampton. The barrier island was part of Fire Island until a nor'easter in 1931 split the island creating Moriches Inlet. The inlet created a geographic oddity whereby the Town of Brookhaven actually has jurisdiction on land immediately west of West Hampton Dunes although Brookhaven land access to it involves a nearly 20-mile (32 km) drive through the Town of Southampton.

The village incorporated in 1993 in attempt to have more control over its precarious state since it was obliterated in the Great Hurricane of 1938, the 1991 Halloween Nor'easter ("The Perfect Storm") and again in a 1992 nor'easter. Specifically, the village wanted to have a say in U.S. Army Corps of Engineers handling of the barrier beach—particularly in response to a series of groynes at Shinnecock Inlet that have created major beach erosion "downstream" in the longshore drift. Almost immediately after incorporation, Gary Vegliante, the village's first mayor, sued the U.S. Army Corps of Engineers for $200 million. The Corps settled the suit and began replenishing the beach leading to a building boom on what had been a devastated empty section of beach.

The American Shore and Beach Preservation Association named West Hampton Dunes one of America's top restored beaches. In 2007, resident Yale Nelson finished a documentary on the town history which premiered October 20, 2007, in Westhampton at the Hamptons Film Festival.

In 1996, West Hampton Dunes was the closest community to the crash of TWA Flight 800, which occurred in the ocean about 8 miles (13 km) due south of it, although news reports focused on the much larger communities across Moriches Bay that provided the water response.

=== Police ===
In 1996, the village, under the authority of a court order, formed a law enforcement agency to better serve the needs of the community. The West Hampton Dunes Police Constabulary consists of approximately 12 members, including a department commissioner and two sergeants. The members are certified as peace officers with the New York State Division of Criminal Justice Services (DCJS) and are trained at either the Suffolk Police and/or Suffolk Sheriffs academy. The members of the department also receive the required DCJS courses for peace officers to perform traffic enforcement duties including Radar/LIDAR, Standard Field Sobriety, and Basic Crash Management.

== Geography ==
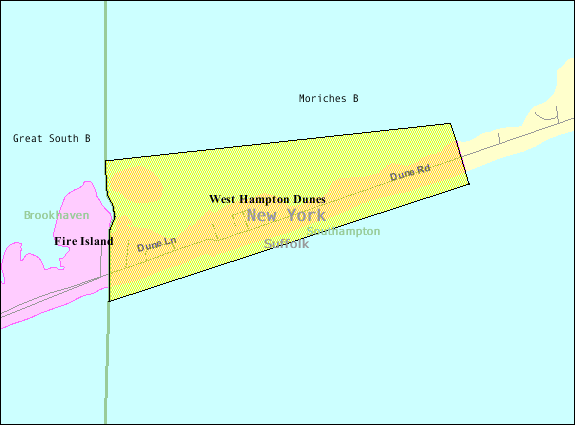
U.S. Census map of West Hampton Dunes.

According to the United States Census Bureau, the village has a total area of 3.9 square miles (10.1 km^{2}), of which 0.35 square miles (0.9 km^{2}) is land and 0.077 square miles (0.2 km^{2}), or 20.45%, is water. There are four named roads in West Hampton Dunes: Dune Road, Dune Lane, Cove Lane, and Widgeon Way.

== Demographics ==
Historical population
Census	Pop.	Note	%±
2000	11		—
2010	55		400.0%
2020	126		129.1%
U.S. Decennial Census

As of the census of 2020, there were 126 people residing in the village. The population density was 32.2 inhabitants per square mile (12.4/km^{2}). There were 172 housing units at an average density of 503.6 per square mile (194.4/km^{2}). The racial makeup of the village was 90.91% White and 9.09% Asian.

There were 7 households, out of which none had children under the age of 18 living with them, 42.9% were married couples living together, and 42.9% were non-families. 42.9% of all households were made up of individuals, and 28.6% had someone living alone who was 65 years of age or older. The average household size was 1.57 and the average family size was 2.00.

In the village, the population was spread out, with 18.2% from 25 to 44, 36.4% from 45 to 64, and 45.5% who were 65 years of age or older. The median age was 58 years. For every 100 females age 18 and over, there were 266.7 males.

The median income for a household in the village was $67,083, and the median income for a family was $127,308. Males had a median income of $32,083 versus $0 for females. The per capita income for the village was $57,150. None of the population and none of the families were below the poverty line.

== Government ==
As of June 2025, the Mayor of West Hampton Dunes is Irwin R. Krasnow, and the Village Trustees are Gary Trimarchi, John J. Eff, Jr, Howard B. Freedman, and Regina M. Mulhearn.

== Education ==
West Hampton Dunes is within the Remsenburg-Speonk Union Free School District.

== See also ==
- List of villages in New York (state)

Preceded by Westhampton Beach	The Hamptons	Succeeded by Cupsogue Beach
