= Moriches Inlet =

Inlet in New York, United States

Coordinates: 40.76447°N 72.754233°W

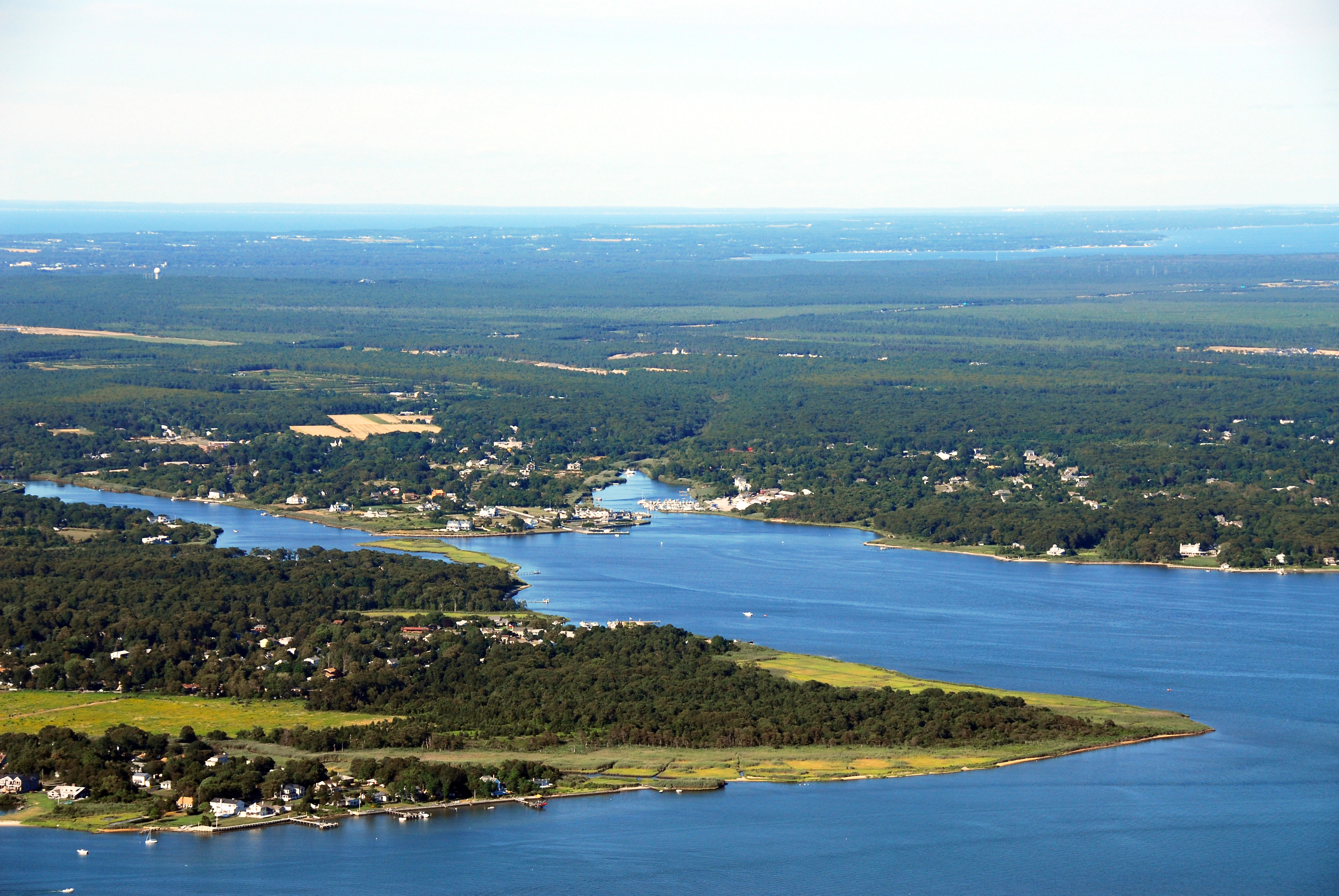
Moriches Inlet aerial view to the North

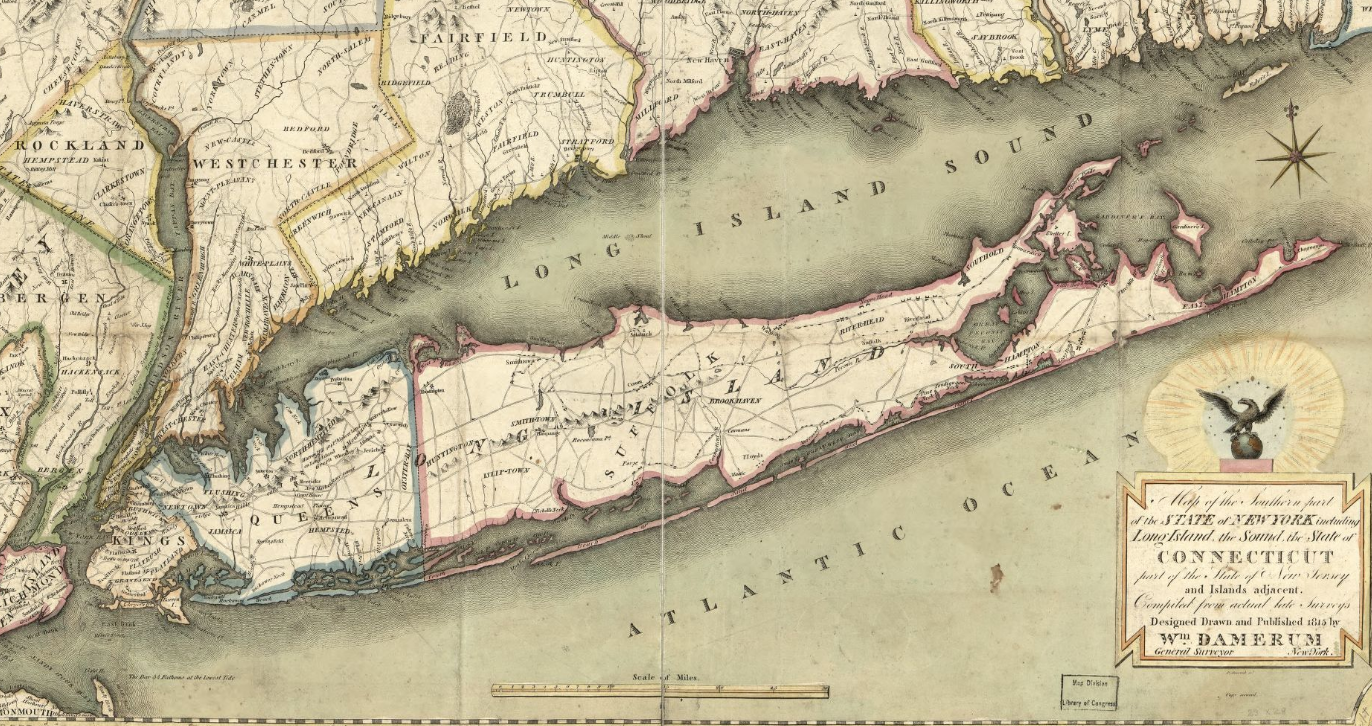
Map of Long Island from 1815 displaying the Moriches Inlet.

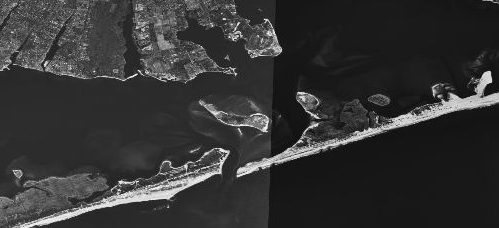
NASA satellite map of the inlet

Moriches Inlet (/moʊˈrɪtʃɪz/ moh-RITCH-iz) is an inlet connecting Moriches Bay and the Atlantic Ocean, in Suffolk County, New York. The name Moriches comes from Meritces – a Native American who owned land on Moriches Neck.

It forms the eastern border of Fire Island and the western border of West Hampton Island – a barrier island on which West Hampton Dunes is located.

== History ==
The inlet splits West Hampton from Fire Island. It was formed by a Nor'easter in 1931. The 1931 storm created a geographic quirk for the western tip of West Hampton Island, which is in the Town of Brookhaven: in order to access the western end of the island via land from Brookhaven, one must travel several miles through the Town of Southampton.

Between 1933 and 1938 Moriches Inlet widened to 4,000 feet (1,200 m) wide and deepened with sand being deposited on both the bay and ocean. The widening subsided in 1938 when the Great Hurricane of 1938 opened up the Shinnecock Inlet further east between Shinnecock Bay and the ocean.

In an attempt to stabilize the deterioration of the barrier island, local authorities built groynes on the inlet between 1952 and 1953. Local authorities have consistently urged for the inlet to be kept open to allow boats from the mainland of Long Island to have access to the ocean.

The United States Army Corps of Engineers took over the maintenance of the inlets and jetties in the 1980s. The Corps, in turn, ran into controversy with claims that the groynes and jetties were blocking the natural east to west longshore drift that replenished sand.

The inlet and groynes were to be blamed for a loss of 8–10 million cubic yards of sand on Fire Island, representing a loss of 100 feet (30 m) of beach and a depth of 12–16 feet along the entire 32-mile (51 km) Fire Island beach zone.

The inlet was the initial primary water access route for recovery ships following the July 17, 1996 crash of TWA Flight 800, which broke up in flight and crashed into the ocean about 8 miles (13 km) from the inlet; throughout the night of July 17–18, boats carrying human remains and aircraft debris passed from the debris field through Moriches Inlet to the East Moriches United States Coast Guard station, before recovery-vessel traffic was shifted to Shinnecock Inlet (18 miles (29 km) to the northeast of the debris field) on July 18, due to the latter inlet's wider, calmer waters.
