= James L. Breese House =

Historic house in New York, United States

- U.S. National Register of Historic Places
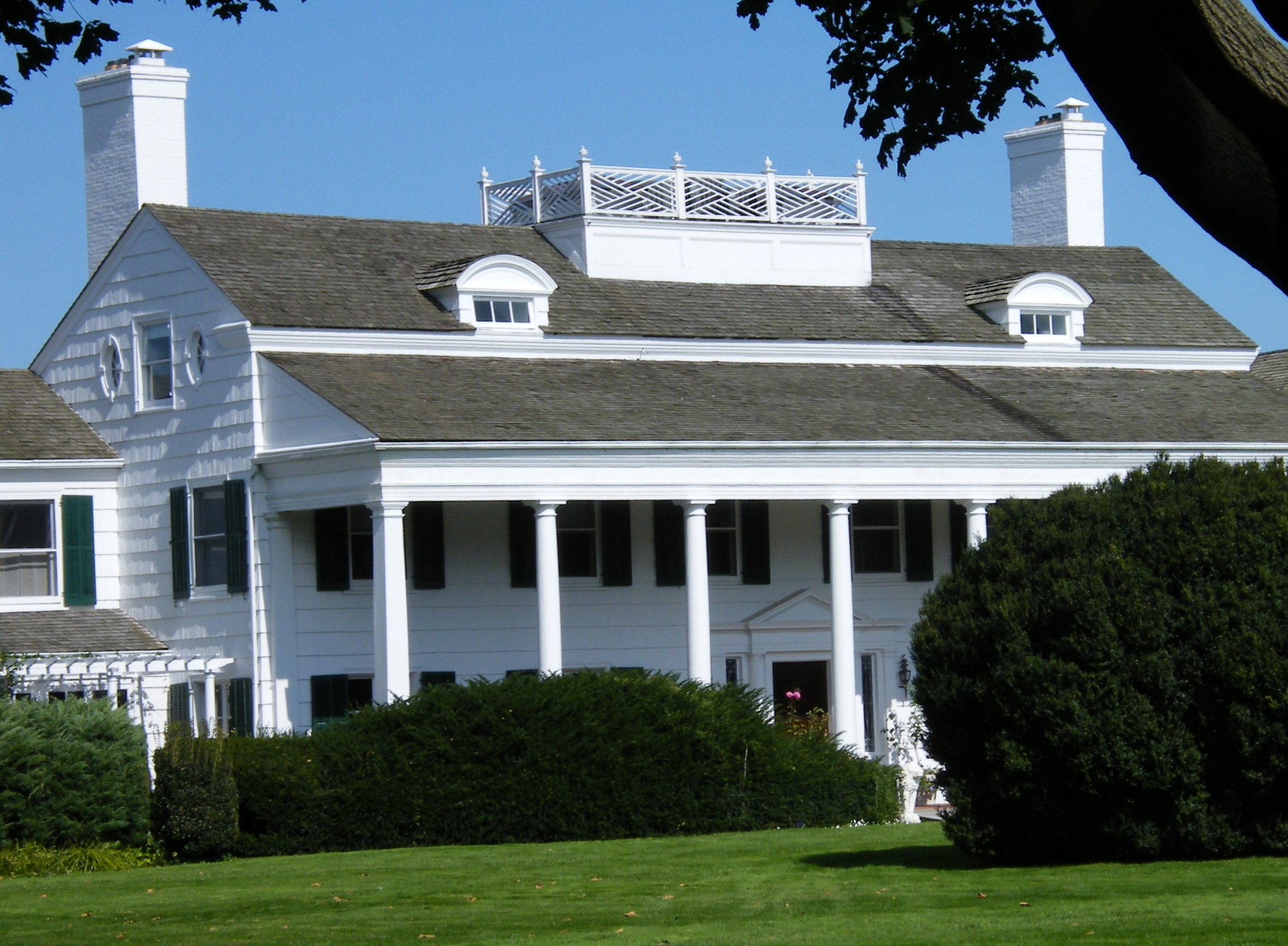
- James L. Breese House, October 2008

- Location within New York Location within the United States
- Location: 155 Hill Street, Southampton, New York
- Coordinates: 40°53′6″N 72°23′56″W
- Area: 4 acres (1.6 ha)
- Built: 1898
- Architect: McKim, Mead & White; White, Stanford
- Architectural style: Colonial Revival
- NRHP reference No.: 80002778
- Added to NRHP: April 18, 1980

James L. Breese House, also known as "The Orchard", is a historic home located at Southampton in Suffolk County, New York. It was designed as a summer residence between 1897 and 1906 by the prominent architectural firm of McKim, Mead, and White in the Colonial Revival style. An 1858 house original to the site was incorporated into the structure. It is two and one half stories high and clad with white painted wood shingles. Its two-story portico is reminiscent of Mount Vernon's.

James Lawrence Breese was a close friend of architect Stanford White, commissioning modifications and additions until the latter's death. The home's spectacular 70-foot "music room" is believed to be White's last completed project.

From 1926 to 1956, it was owned by Charles E. Merrill (1885–1956), who deeded it to Amherst College. Amherst College later sold it to the Nyack School for Boys, which closed in 1977. It is located within the Southampton Village Historic District.

It was added to the National Register of Historic Places in 1980.
