= Westhampton Beach, New York =

- Village
- Incorporated Village of Westhampton Beach
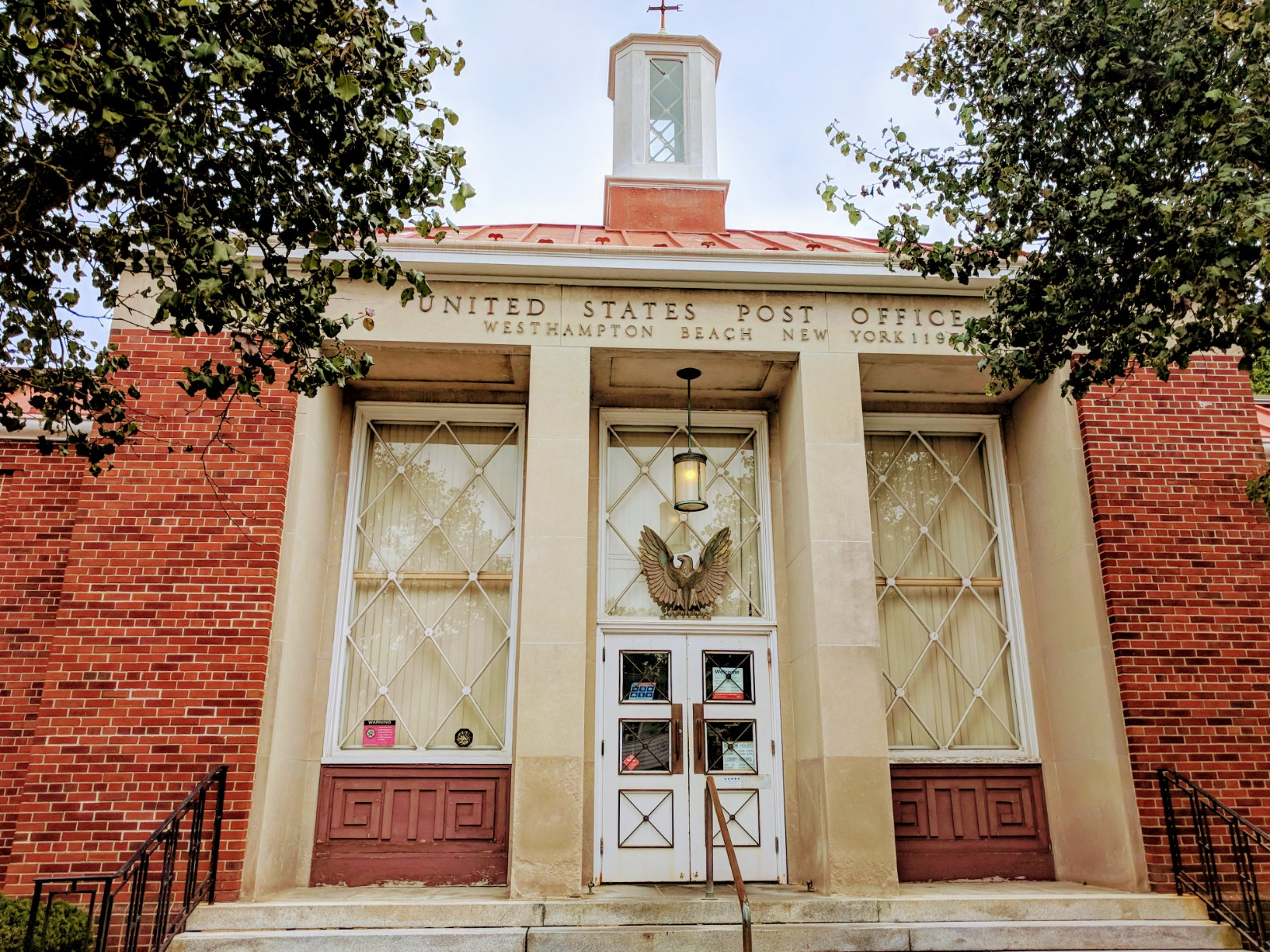
- The front entrance to the historic Westhampton Beach Post Office in 2018

- Location in Suffolk County and the state of New York

- Location on Long Island Location within the state of New York
- Coordinates: 40°48′32″N 72°38′46″W
- Country: United States
- State: New York
- County: Suffolk
- Town: Southampton
- Incorporated: 1928

Area
  - Total: 3.01 sq mi (7.79 km^{2})
  - Land: 2.94 sq mi (7.62 km^{2})
  - Water: 0.066 sq mi (0.17 km^{2})
- Elevation: 6.6 ft (2 m)

Population (2020)
  - Total: 2,150
  - Density: 731.2/sq mi (282.31/km^{2})
- Time zone: UTC-5 (Eastern (EST))
  - Summer (DST): UTC-4 (EDT)
- ZIP code: 11978
- Area codes: 631, 934
- FIPS code: 36-80181
- GNIS feature ID: 0970921
- Website: www.westhamptonbeach.gov

Westhampton Beach is an incorporated village located within the Town of Southampton, in Suffolk County, on the South Shore of Long Island, in New York, United States. The population was 2,150 at the time of the 2020 census.

== History ==
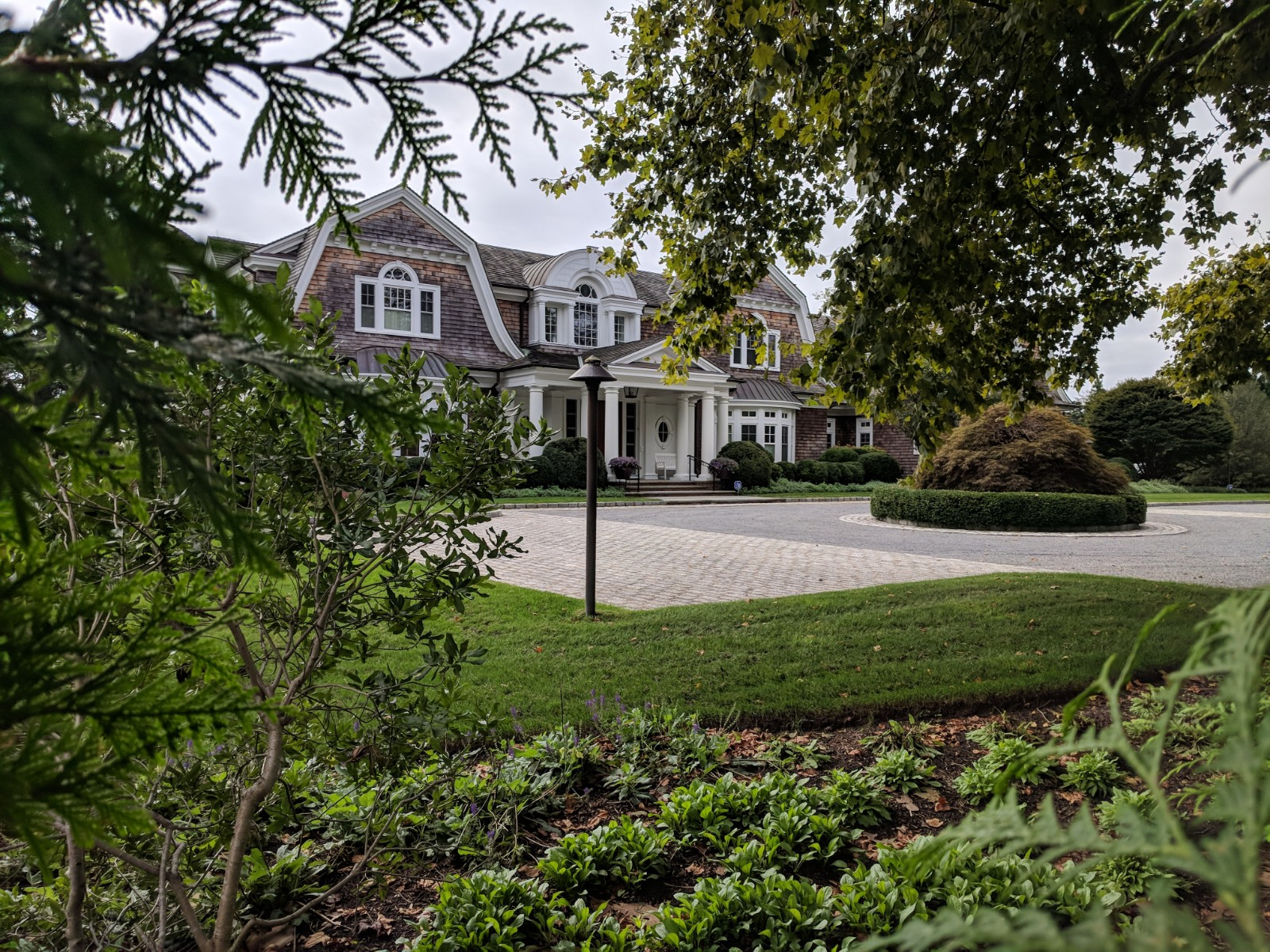
Westhampton Beach Shingle-Style home

Westhampton Beach Village was incorporated in 1928. In 1938, almost all summer homes on its barrier beach were obliterated by the Long Island Express hurricane, which resulted in twenty-nine deaths within the community.

Like most of the shoreline of southern Long Island, the beach at Westhampton Beach was eroding shoreward. This became a political issue in the 1960s. The project to protect the beaches in the area from further erosion was started by the Army Corps of Engineers in 1966, but was only partially completed because of the failure to secure funds from the state and local government. In addition the project design was seriously flawed. As a result, there was increased erosion at the beaches in Westhampton Beach while, up current, the beaches actually grew. During the late 1970s and through the 1980s, beach homes were washed away with every severe storm (nor'easter) that hit the coast.

It was only after the nor'easter of November 1992 destroyed over eighty homes, that the Army Corps of Engineers began renewed repair efforts. In the mid-1990s, fifteen historic houses were relocated by the Army Corps of Engineers. The homes were moved off the beach and out of harm's way, at least for a while, but the beach would still erode and additional damage would occur with every storm. Additional work was required after Hurricane Sandy in 2012.

== Geography ==
According to the United States Census Bureau, the village has a total area of 3.0 square miles (7.8 km^{2}), of which 2.9 square miles (7.5 km^{2}) is land and 0.1 square miles (0.26 km^{2}), or 2.35%, is water.

=== Climate ===
Westhampton Beach has a hot-summer humid continental climate (Dfa) bordering a humid subtropical climate (Cfa). It has one to two months averaging below freezing, six months above 50 °F (10 °C), and one to two months above 22 °C (72 °F).

== Demographics ==
Historical population
| Census | Pop. | Note | %± |
|---|---|---|---|
| 1930 | 994 | | — |
| 1940 | 969 | | −2.5% |
| 1950 | 1,087 | | 12.2% |
| 1960 | 1,460 | | 34.3% |
| 1970 | 1,926 | | 31.9% |
| 1980 | 1,629 | | −15.4% |
| 1990 | 1,571 | | −3.6% |
| 2000 | 1,902 | | 21.1% |
| 2010 | 1,721 | | −9.5% |
| 2020 | 2,150 | | 24.9% |
U.S. Decennial Census

=== Racial and ethnic composition ===
Westhampton Beach village, New York – Racial and ethnic composition Note: the US Census treats Hispanic/Latino as an ethnic category. This table excludes Latinos from the racial categories and assigns them to a separate category. Hispanics/Latinos may be of any race.
| Race / Ethnicity (NH = Non-Hispanic) | Pop 2000 | Pop 2010 | Pop 2020 | % 2000 | % 2010 | % 2020 |
|---|---|---|---|---|---|---|
| White alone (NH) | 1,618 | 1,299 | 1,694 | 85.07% | 75.48% | 78.79% |
| Black or African American alone (NH) | 88 | 46 | 33 | 4.63% | 2.67% | 1.53% |
| Native American or Alaska Native alone (NH) | 8 | 0 | 1 | 0.42% | 0.00% | 0.05% |
| Asian alone (NH) | 22 | 17 | 49 | 1.16% | 0.99% | 2.28% |
| Native Hawaiian or Pacific Islander alone (NH) | 1 | 0 | 0 | 0.05% | 0.00% | 0.00% |
| Other race alone (NH) | 3 | 0 | 10 | 0.16% | 0.00% | 0.47% |
| Mixed race or Multiracial (NH) | 16 | 19 | 44 | 0.84% | 1.10% | 2.05% |
| Hispanic or Latino (any race) | 146 | 340 | 319 | 7.68% | 19.76% | 14.84% |
| Total | 1,902 | 1,721 | 2,150 | 100.00% | 100.00% | 100.00% |

=== 2000 census ===
As of the census of 2000, there were 1,902 people, 1805 households, and 498 families residing in the village. The population density was 654.2 inhabitants per square mile (252.6/km^{2}). There were 2,279 housing units at an average density of 783.9 per square mile (302.7/km^{2}). The racial makeup of the village was 89.17% White, 4.63% African American, 0.42% Native American, 1.16% Asian, 0.05% Pacific Islander, 2.84% from other races, and 1.74% from two or more races. Hispanic or Latino of any race were 7.68% of the population.

There were 805 households, out of which 22.2% had children under the age of 18 living with them, 47.1% were married couples living together, 11.1% had a female householder with no husband present, and 38.1% were non-families. 32.7% of all households were made up of individuals, and 13.7% had someone living alone who was 65 years of age or older. The average household size was 2.25 and the average family size was 2.81.

In the village, the population was spread out, with 20.5% under the age of 18, 6.1% from 18 to 24, 24.6% from 25 to 44, 28.2% from 45 to 64, and 20.7% who were 65 years of age or older. The median age was 44 years. For every 100 females, there were 93.5 males. For every 100 females age 18 and over, there were 92.2 males.

The median income for a household in the village was $58,438, and the median income for a family was $74,412. Males had a median income of $55,625 versus $33,000 for females. The per capita income for the village was $38,500. About 6.8% of families and 9.0% of the population were below the poverty line, including 10.9% of those under age 18 and 4.3% of those age 65 or over.

== Education ==
Westhampton Beach is served primarily by the Westhampton Beach Union Free School District. Additionally, a small portion of the southeastern edge of the village is within the boundaries of the Quogue Union Free School District.

== Fire and emergency services ==
Westhampton Beach has police, ambulance, and fire departments.

== Transportation ==
Westhampton Beach and the surrounding area is served by Sunrise Highway (NY 27), which is a major artery to the western parts of Long Island and New York City. The hamlet is also served by Montauk Highway (CR 80), a two-lane road which runs from New York City to Montauk. Montauk Highway serves as the "Main Street" of many towns and villages along the south shore of Long Island.

The Long Island Rail Road provides limited rail service seven days per week via the Montauk Branch connecting Westhampton to Montauk and New York City. Hampton Jitney coach bus service provides slightly more frequent passenger travel between New York City and Westhampton, especially during summer months. Local Suffolk County buses also provide service to neighboring areas.

== Landmarks ==
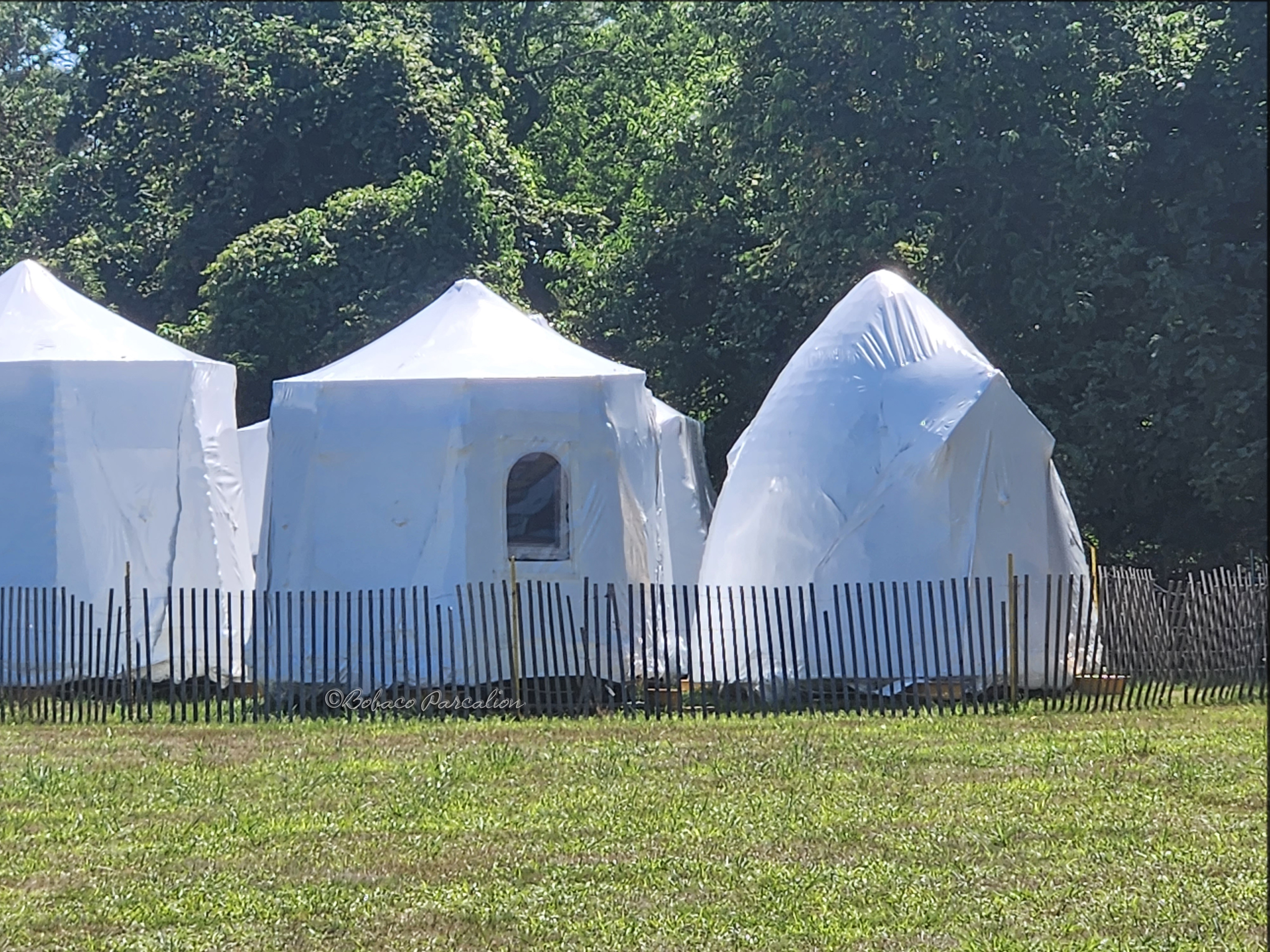
Gov. John Adams Dix Windmill in process of being moved, July 2023

The Crowther House, Foster-Meeker House, and U.S. Post Office are listed on the National Register of Historic Places.

== See also ==
- List of municipalities in New York
- Westhampton, New York
- West Hampton Dunes, New York
- Dix Windmill
- Southampton (village), New York
- Quogue, New York

| Preceded by Quogue | The Hamptons | Succeeded by West Hampton Dunes |
