= Southampton summer colony =

Community group

The Village Improvement Association of Southampton (VIAS) was founded in 1881 by Dr. T. Gaillard Thomas and a group of men with the goal of promoting and carrying out projects for the beautification and sanitation of the village of Southampton. They referred to themselves as the Southampton Summer Colony.

== Founders ==
The Village Improvement Association of Southampton (VIAS) was founded in 1881 with the goal of promoting and carrying out projects for the beautification and sanitation of the village of Southampton. Dr. Thomas was the founder of the Southampton Summer Colony and within four years, he convinced many others to build there. By 1882, there were 30 summer homes in the area, and two years later, Dr. Thomas and others in the group formed the Southampton Village Improvement Association to improve the area and make it more attractive to potential summer residents. They planted trees and worked to remove nuisances and clean up the area. They planted 190 shade trees on each side of Main St. They induced a dry goods merchant to clean up his yard. Dr. Thomas and his friends ultimately established many of the leading institutions in Southampton including the St. Andrews Dune Church, the Shinnecock Golf Club, the Meadow Club, the Southampton Beach Club and The Parrish Art Museum (now located in Water Mill, NY). The village of Southampton, near the location of the Southampton Bathing Association, had a group of beach shacks called "wigwams" where locals could change into bathing suits before going for a swim. However, two summer residents, Salem Wales and George R. Schieffelin, had the wigwams removed, which led to a legal dispute between the locals and the summer residents over who owned the beach. This dispute went to court in 1892 and was in relation to the beachfront property of Architect Charles Wyllys Betts.

The Southampton Village Improvement Association (SVIA) was formed by the summer residents of Southampton in the 1880s, and included some prominent local farmers and merchants without their prior knowledge or consent. The summer residents believed that this would give them broad representation, but the decision-making power remained primarily with the executive committee, which did not include these local members.

The SVIA also gave an honorary membership to Walter Burling, the publisher of The Seaside Times, in order to secure positive press coverage for the organization. However, there was one group that the SVIA could not go up against, and that was the Long Island Rail Road. The railroad was a powerful force in the region and had significant influence over transportation and development in Southampton. 4,000 acres of Shinnecock Hills was being developed by the Long Island Improvement Company (LIIC) which was a subsidiary of the Long Island Railroad. Austin Corbin (Gilded age Robber Baron and later pres. of LIRR) formed the Long Island Improvement Company in 1881 with the aim of developing summer residences on Long Island, particularly in Southampton. He faced competition from the already established Southampton summer colony. A legal dispute arose between local residents and summer residents over the ownership of the beach. The locals claimed they owned the beach, while the summer residents claimed they had bought it legally. In 1892, a judge ruled that the beach in front of the summer residents' houses belonged to them, but the locals could still haul their fish and have free passage. This ruling marked the formalization of the exclusive nature of the Southampton Summer Colony as it exists today.

== Beach access ==
The Dongan Patent, issued by Governor Thomas Dongan in 1686, was a land grant that established the rights and privileges of the Town Trustees of the Town of East Hampton, New York. One of the key provisions of the patent was the granting of an easement, which gave the Town Trustees the power to regulate activities within a specific zone, such as fishing and collecting seaweed. This power is still exercised by the Town Trustees to this day.

The judge's ruling in 1892 established that the beach in front of the summer residents' houses belonged to them, but that the locals could still access the beach via designated pathways. While this was a compromise, it was seen as a disappointment by the locals who felt they had lost access to what had previously been considered a public resource. Prior to the 1880's locals used the hard packed sand of the beach for wagons with wide wooden wheels as it was better than the inland road which was rugged and pitted.

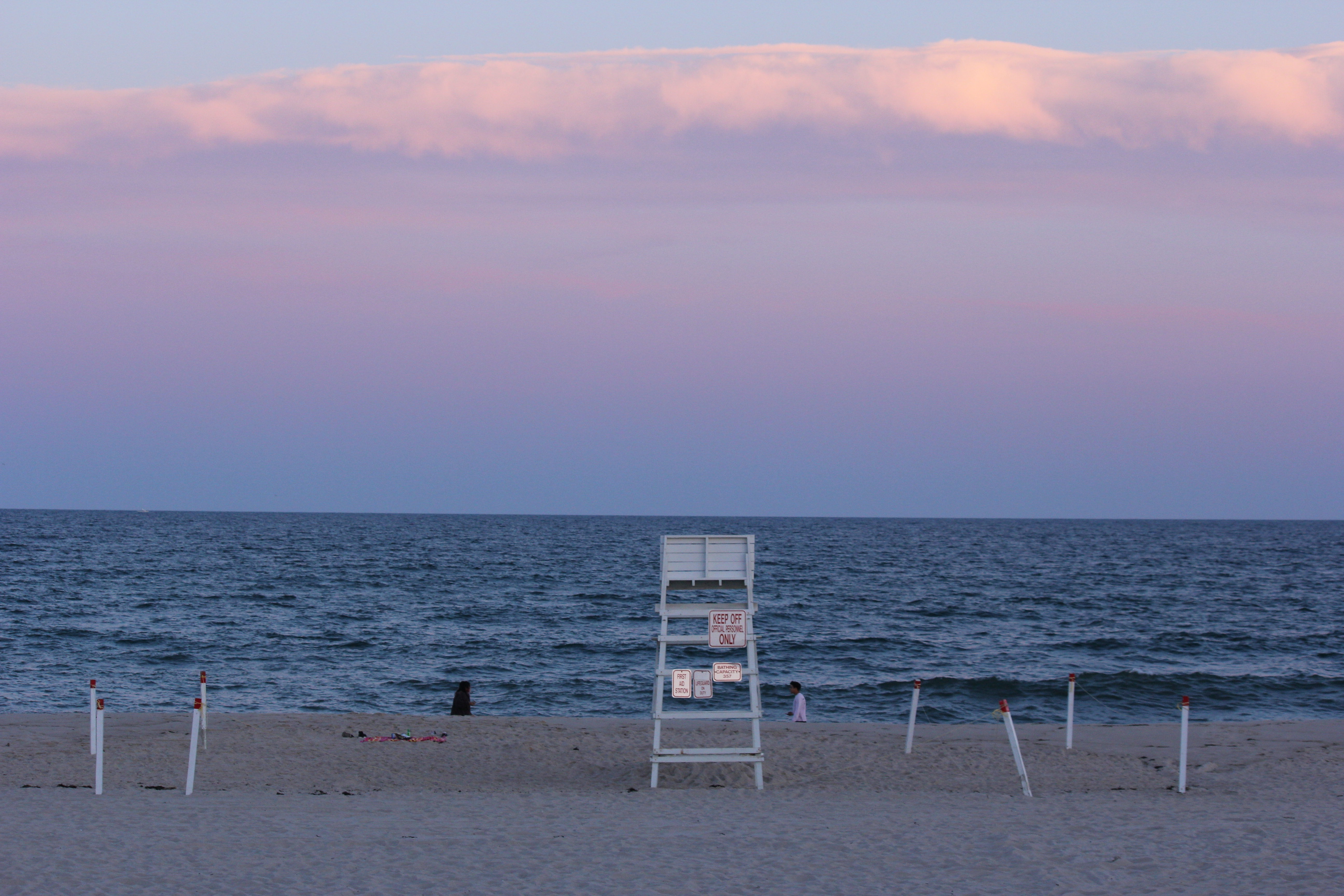
Cooper's Beach Southampton

This fight over beach access has morphed into today's lawsuits over fishermen's and truck access to the same town beaches.

== Fenced beachfront ==
This ruling formalized the exclusive nature of the Southampton Summer Colony and solidified the division between the local year-round residents and the wealthy summer residents. This division still exists to some extent today, with the Southampton Summer Colony being known for its exclusivity and affluence.

The organization is still active and supports various beautification projects like tree planting and flowerbeds throughout the village.

== Tribal lands ==
The Shinnecock tribe of Southampton believes they should have unrestricted access to the beaches as the land was theirs until it was sold in the 1860s. To access the beaches they, like everyone else that lives locally and visits, must pay $300 for a town permit or $40 to park at Cooper's Beach for one day. Cooper's Beach, which is consistently ranked as one of America's top ten beaches, is located less than 10 minutes from the reservation and Shinnecocks are required to pay for parking, like all residents and visitors.

== 2005 action by legislators ==
State Assemblyman Fred W. Thiele Jr. and State Senator Kenneth P. LaValle have introduced legislation to guarantee that local government agencies continue to regulate vehicle access on public beaches. The bill would protect the right of East End residents to ride their four-wheel-drive vehicles on area beaches, which has been threatened by legislation sponsored by a State Assemblyman from Westchester and a notice of claim filed by a group of beachfront homeowners in Southampton Village. Town, county, and state officials gathered in Hampton Bays to pledge to stave off challenges that seek to limit beach vehicle access. The legislation will be introduced when the legislature reconvenes in January.

It is possible that legislation aimed at controlling access to beaches may be seen as an attempt to usurp local control, particularly if it is perceived as being driven by pressure from a small group of wealthy property owners. This perception may stem from the fact that such legislation could limit public access to the beach, potentially benefiting the property owners at the expense of the wider community. This is a perception and the actual intent behind the legislation may be different.

== See also ==
- Southampton, New York
- Good Ground Windmill
