= Balcastle =

Historic house in New York, United States

- U.S. National Register of Historic Places
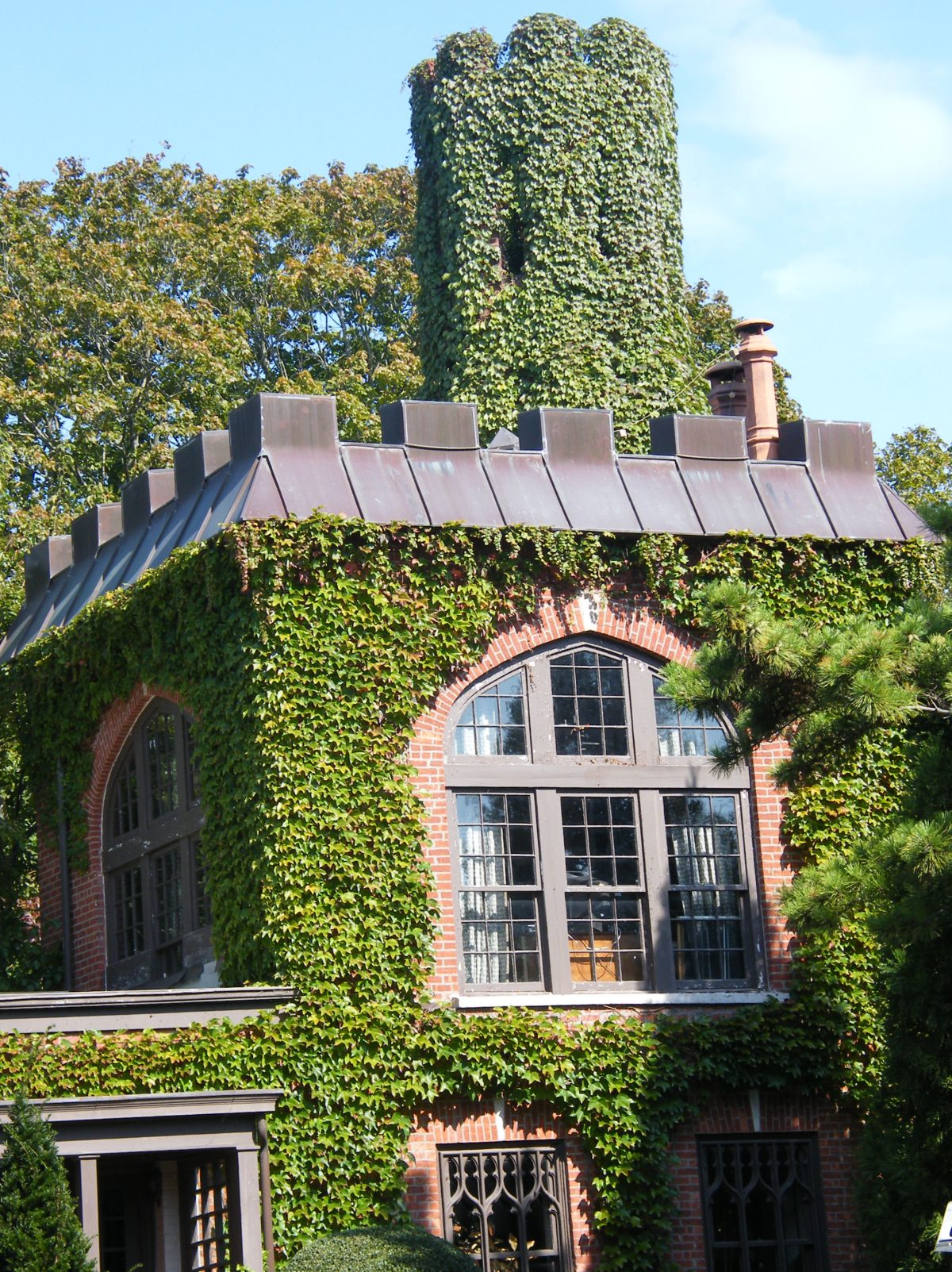
- Balcastle, October 2008

- Location within New York Location within the United States
- Location: NW corner of Herrick and Little Plains Rds., Southampton, New York
- Coordinates: 40°53′2″N 72°23′4″W
- Area: less than one acre
- Built: 1910
- Architect: Elliston, Edward
- Architectural style: Late 19th And 20th Century Revivals, Castellated Gothic
- MPS: Southampton Village MRA
- NRHP reference No.: 86002722
- Added to NRHP: October 2, 1986

Balcastle is a historic home located at Southampton in Suffolk County, New York. It was built in 1910 and is a large 1-story, five-bay, brick-sheathed residence with a small 1 1/2-story octagonal tower on the west side and large, 2-story square tower on the east side. It is an example of castellated Gothic architecture. Also on the property is a small, wood-frame hexagonal garden pavilion.

It remains privately owned as of 2025.

It was added to the National Register of Historic Places in 1986.
