= Wickapogue Road Historic District =

Historic district in New York, United States

- U.S. National Register of Historic Places
- U.S. Historic district
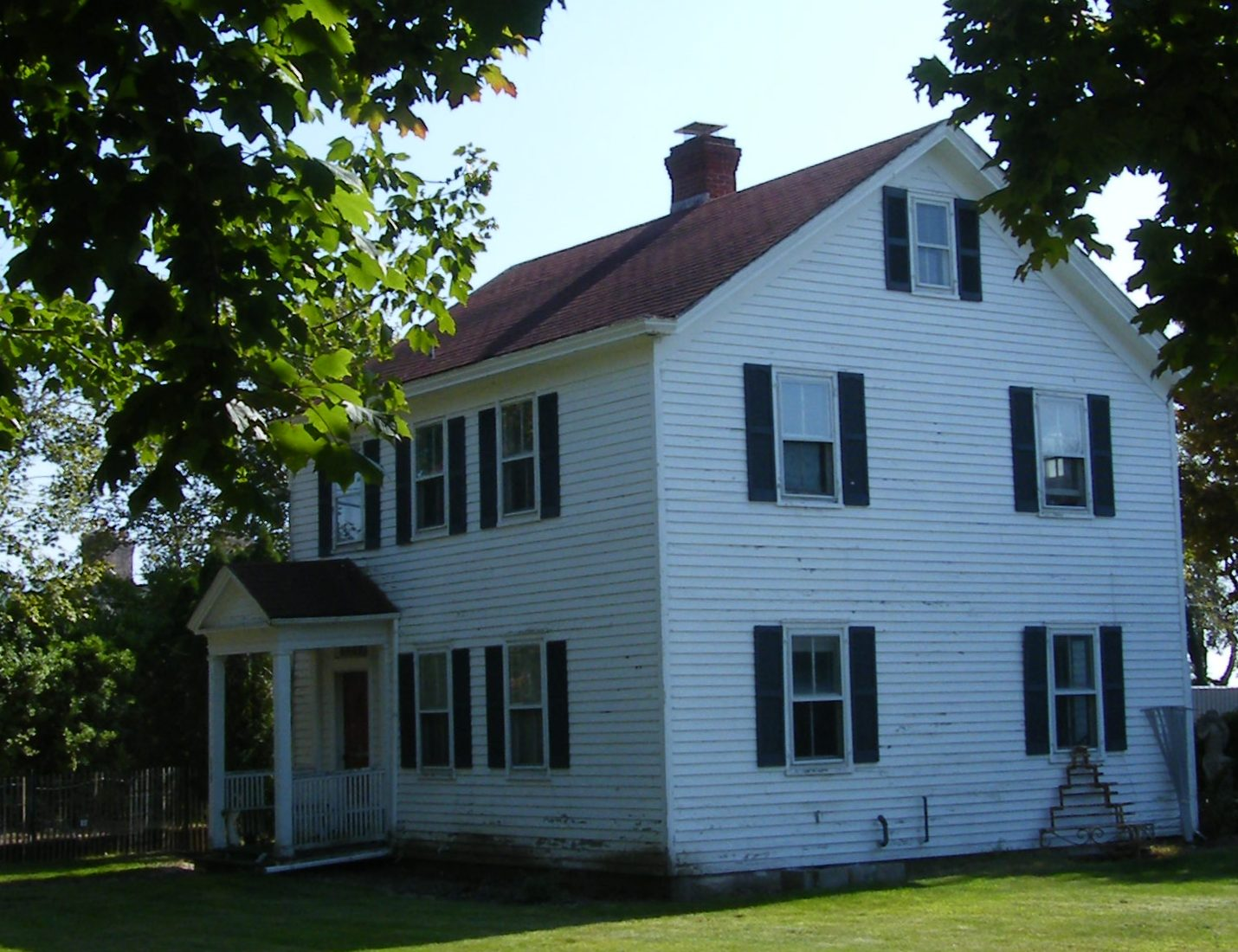
- Wickapogue Road Historic District, October 2008

- Location within New York Location within the United States
- Location: Wickapogue Rd. between Narrow Ln. and Cobb Rd., Southampton, New York
- Coordinates: 40°53′1″N 72°22′3″W
- Area: 27 acres (11 ha)
- Built: 1684
- MPS: Southampton Village MRA
- NRHP reference No.: 86002697
- Added to NRHP: October 2, 1986

Wickapogue Road Historic District is a national historic district located at Southampton in Suffolk County, New York. The district has 17 contributing buildings located on six farmsteads. It is a rare surviving cohesive collection of historic farmsteads which illustrate Southampton's early agrarian settlement and subsequent agricultural development from 1684 to 1910.

It was added to the National Register of Historic Places in 1986.

== See also ==
- Beach Road Historic District
- North Main Street Historic District
- Southampton Village Historic District
