= North Main Street Historic District (Southampton, New York) =

Historic district in New York, United States

- U.S. National Register of Historic Places
- U.S. Historic district
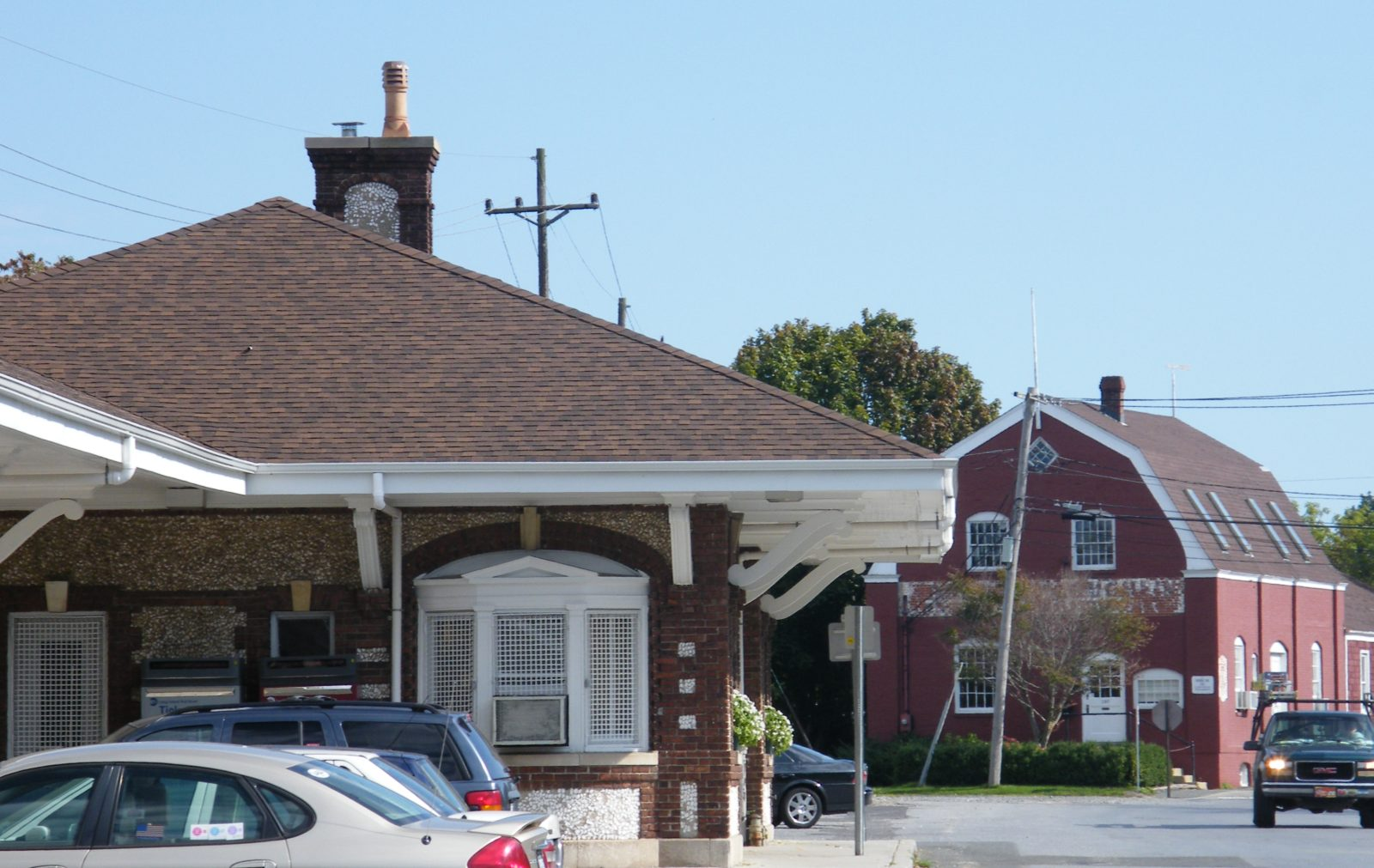
- View of the district from the Southampton Railroad Station

- Location within New York Location within the United States
- Location: N. Main St. near CR 39 and Railroad Station Plaza, Southampton, New York
- Coordinates: 40°53′45″N 72°23′27″W
- Area: 20 acres (8.1 ha)
- MPS: Southampton Village MRA
- NRHP reference No.: 86002730
- Added to NRHP: October 2, 1986

The North Main Street Historic District is a historic district that was listed on the National Register of Historic Places in 1986.

It includes the Southampton (LIRR station), along with North Main Street itself between Railroad Plaza and just south of Suffolk CR 39.

== See also ==
- Beach Road Historic District
- Southampton Village Historic District
- Wickapogue Road Historic District
