= Foster-Meeker House =

Historic house in New York, United States

- U.S. National Register of Historic Places
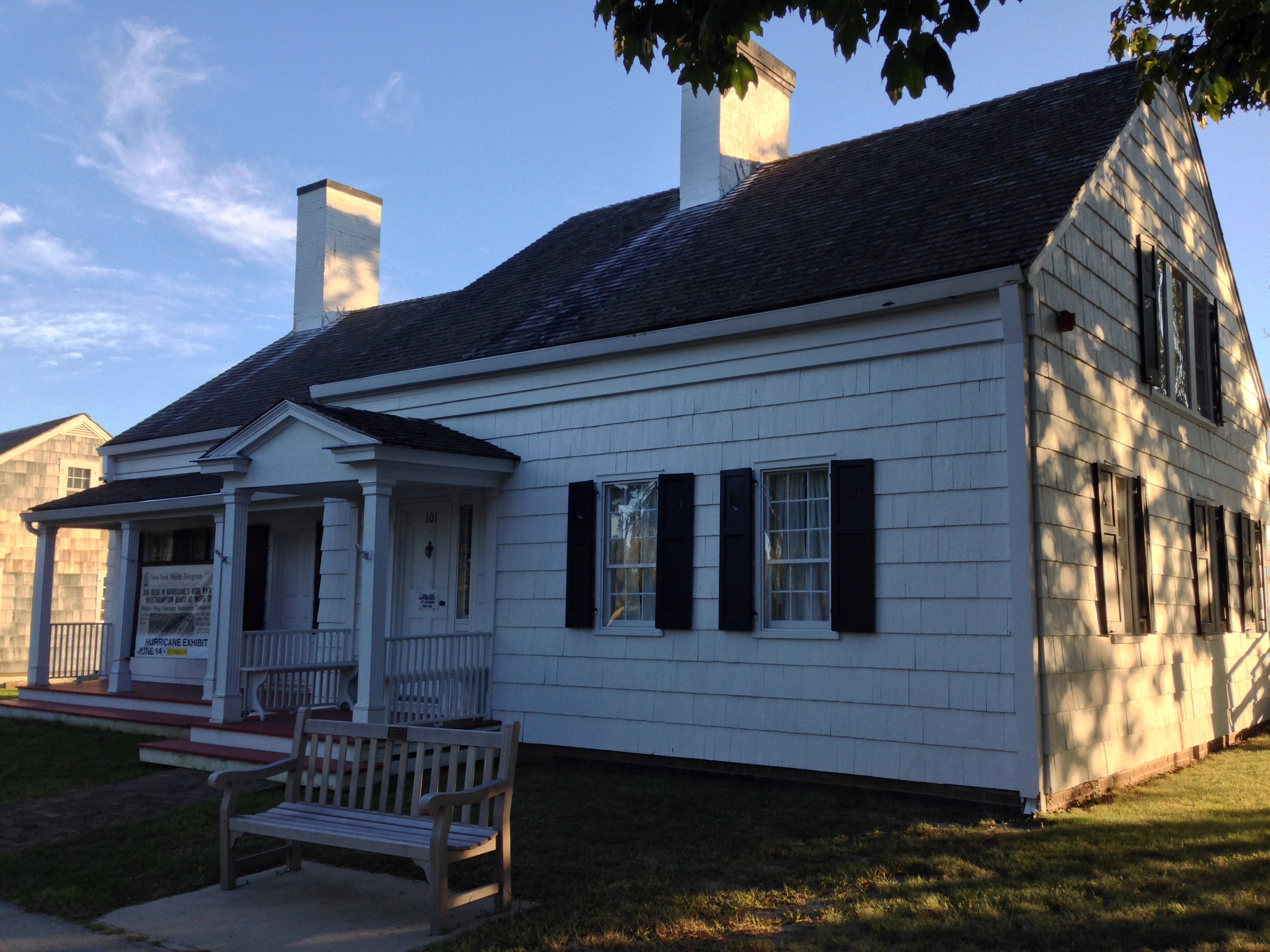

- Location within New York Location within the United States
- Location: 101 Mill Rd., Westhampton Beach, New York
- Coordinates: 40°48′44.43″N 72°38′36.41″W
- Area: 0.9 acres (0.36 ha)
- Built: 1750
- NRHP reference No.: 09000656
- Added to NRHP: August 26, 2009

Foster-Meeker House is a historic home located at Westhampton Beach in Suffolk County, New York. It was built about 1750 and is a classic Long Island, Cape Cod-type dwelling. It is a one-story, five-bay, center-door dwelling whose compact massing is characteristic of mid-18th century construction. It was acquired by the Westhampton Beach Historical Society in 2008 and moved to its present location to prevent demolition.

It was added to the National Register of Historic Places in 2009.
