= Crowther House =

Historic house in New York, United States

- U.S. National Register of Historic Places
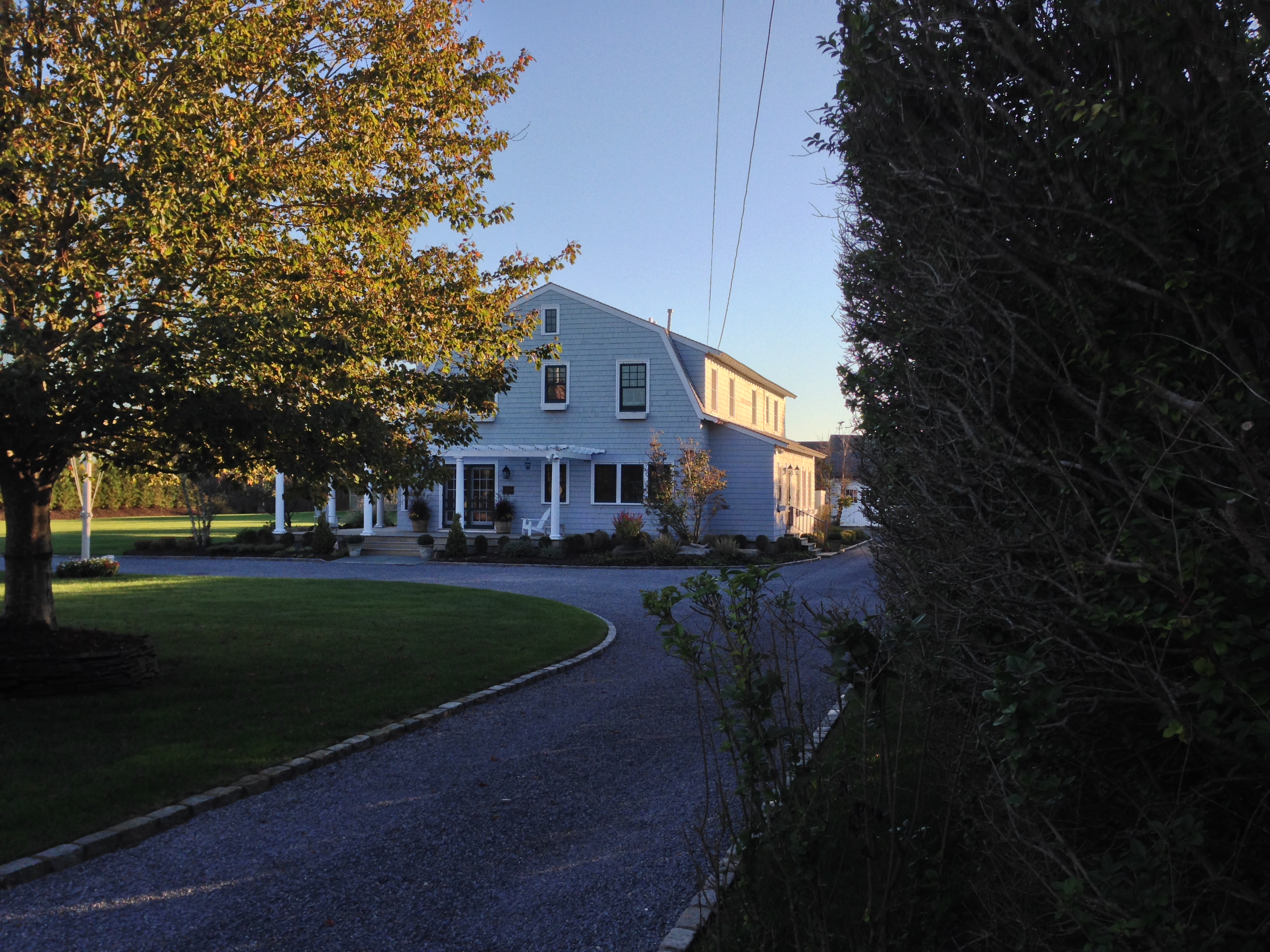

- Location within New York Location within the United States
- Location: 97 Beach Lane, Westhampton Beach, New York
- Coordinates: 40°48′16″N 72°38′3″W
- Area: 1.5 acres (0.61 ha)
- Built: 1910
- Architectural style: Shingle Style, Vernacular Shingle
- NRHP reference No.: 85000630
- Added to NRHP: March 21, 1985

Crowther House is a historic home located at Westhampton Beach in Suffolk County, New York. It is a large, two-story wood-frame house in the Shingle Style and built in 1910. It features a gambrel roof with long shed dormers. Also on the property is a detached garage.

It was added to the National Register of Historic Places in 1985.
