= William Merritt Chase Homestead =

Historic house in New York, United States

- U.S. National Register of Historic Places
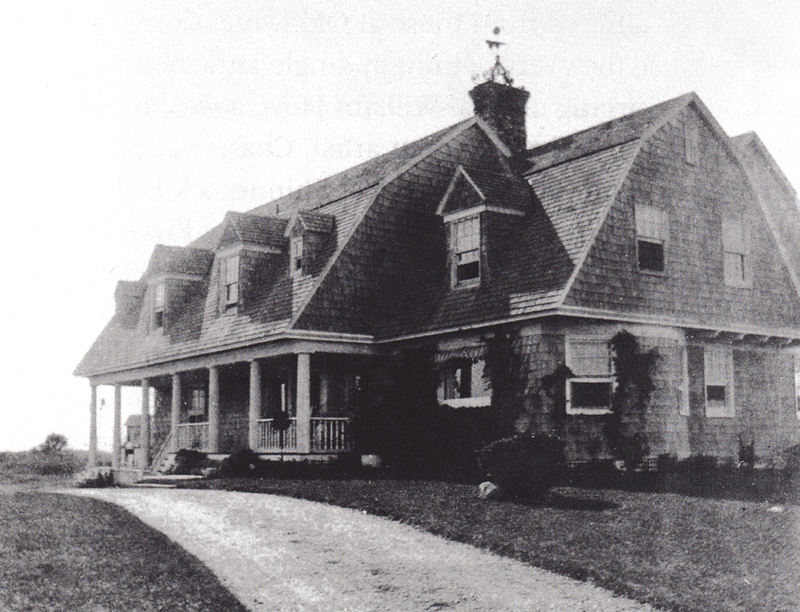
- 1895 photograph of the Chase Homestead

- Location within New York Location within the United States
- Location: Canoe Place Road, Shinnecock Hills, New York
- Coordinates: 40°53′15″N 72°28′38″W
- Area: 2.3 acres (0.93 ha)
- Built: 1892
- Architect: McKim, Mead & White
- NRHP reference No.: 83001808
- Added to NRHP: June 16, 1983

William Merritt Chase Homestead is a historic home located at Shinnecock Hills in Suffolk County, New York.

== History ==
It was built as a residence and studio for artist William Merritt Chase (1849–1916) in 1892 by the prominent architectural firm of McKim, Mead, and White. It is a 2 1/2-story frame structure sheathed in wood shingles that have weathered to a muted, sun-bleached brown. Four gable dormers and three eyebrow windows (added in 1917) project from the gambrel roof. A rear laundry room, porch, and bathroom were added in 1920. Also on the property is a 1-story wood-frame barn.

The house was the subject of one of Chase's own paintings in 1893. It was added to the National Register of Historic Places in 1983.
