= Capt. C. Goodale House =

Historic house in New York, United States

- U.S. National Register of Historic Places
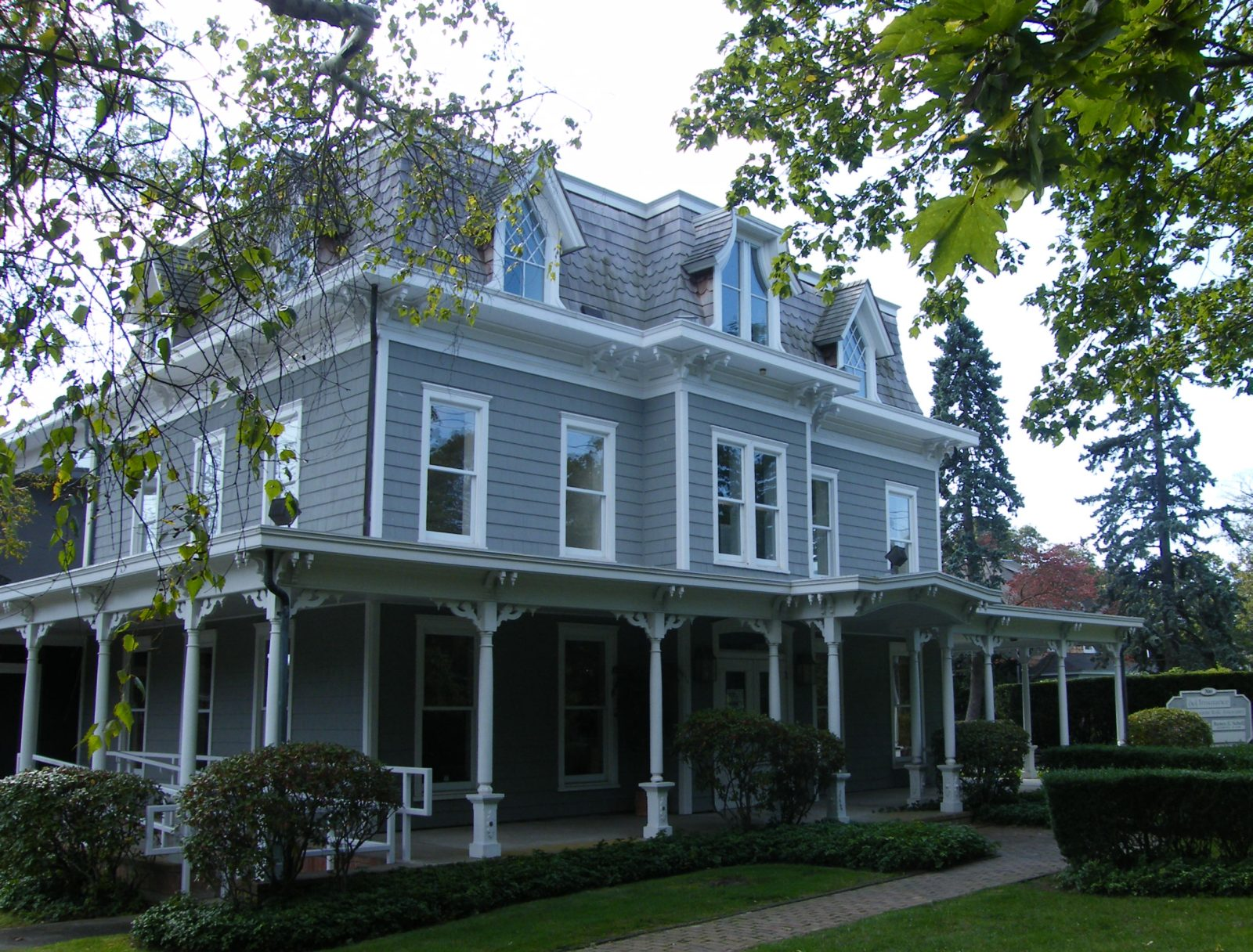
- Capt. C. Goodale House, October 2008

- Location within New York Location within the United States
- Location: 300 Hampton Rd., Southampton, New York
- Coordinates: 40°53′29″N 72°22′51″W
- Area: 1.9 acres (0.77 ha)
- Built: 1875
- Architectural style: Second Empire
- MPS: Southampton Village MRA
- NRHP reference No.: 86002725
- Added to NRHP: October 2, 1986

Capt. C. Goodale House is a historic home located at Southampton in Suffolk County, New York. It was built in 1875 and is a large 2 1/2-story, five bay residence with an original 2-story (flat roofed) rear wing and smaller period wing. It features a central entrance pavilion, mansard roof, and wraparound porch. It is an example of Second Empire architecture. Also on the property is a contributing privy.

It was added to the National Register of Historic Places in 1986.
