= T. Gaillard Thomas =

American gynaecologist (1831–1903)

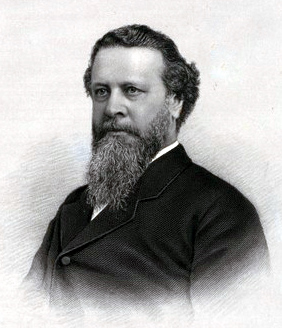
Thomas in 1880

Theodore Gaillard Thomas (November 21, 1831 – February 28, 1903) was an American gynæcologist, born in Edisto Island, S. C., and educated in Charleston. He studied in Europe, principally in Paris and Dublin, in 1853-55, and began the practice of his profession in New York. He was a lecturer in New York University (1855–63), and professor in the Columbia University College of Physicians and Surgeons, New York City (1863–1889, where he held the chair of gynæcology when he retired. Thomas was the first to perform and publish an account of vaginal ovariotomy (1870). He wrote Diseases of Women (Philadelphia, 1868), which passed through six editions in English, and was translated into French, German, Spanish, Chinese, and Italian. He died at Thomasville, Georgia in 1903.

== Terms ==
- Thomas pessary — A form of uterine pessary

Dorland's - 1938

== See also ==
Southampton summer colony
