= Beach Road Historic District =

Historic district in New York, United States

- U.S. National Register of Historic Places
- U.S. Historic district
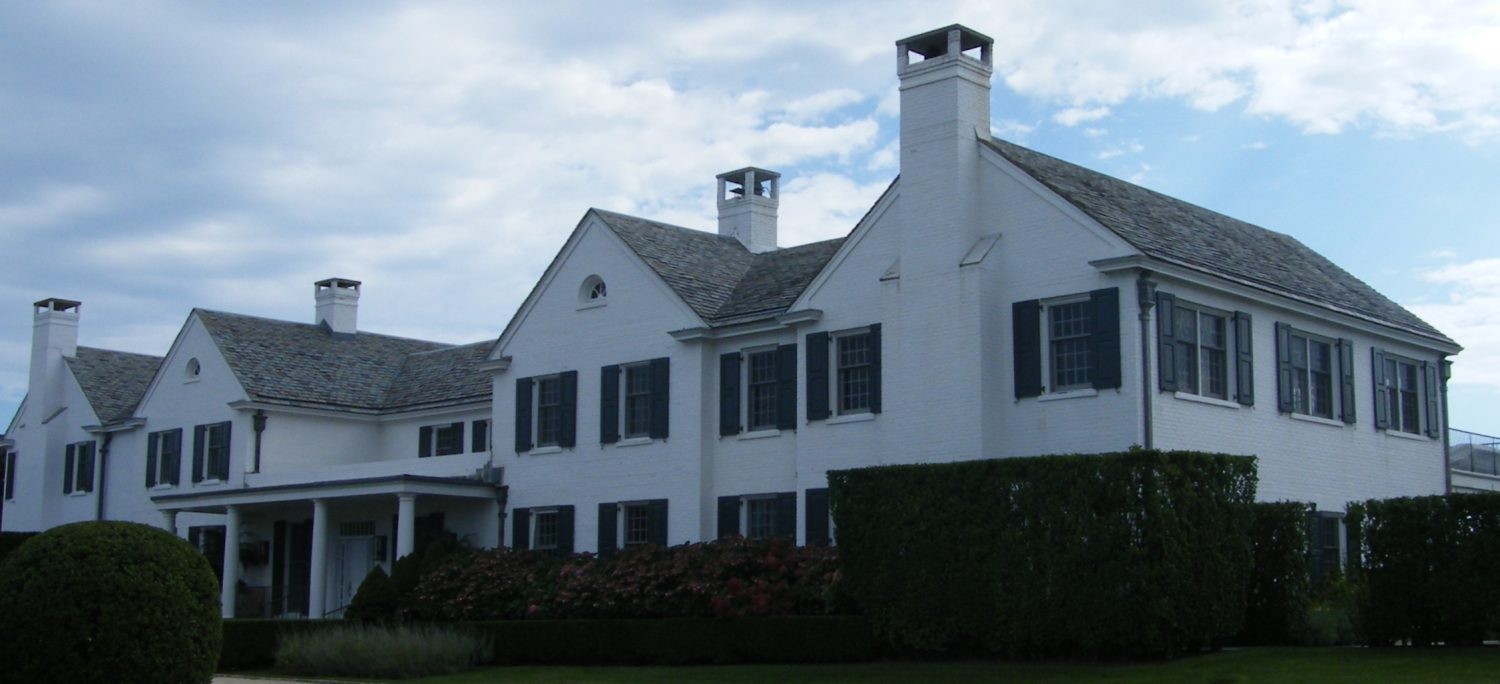
- 600 Beach Road, October 2008

- Location within New York Location within the United States
- Location: Between Shinnecock and Halsely Neck Rds. on Beach Rd. at Barrier Beach, Southampton, New York
- Coordinates: 40°51′44″N 72°25′3″W
- Area: 45 acres (18 ha)
- Architect: Cross & Cross, et al.
- Architectural style: Late 19th and 20th Century Revivals
- MPS: Southampton Village MRA
- NRHP reference No.: 86002723
- Added to NRHP: October 2, 1986

Beach Road Historic District is a national historic district located at Southampton in Suffolk County, New York. The district has nine contributing buildings. They are large mansions that are centerpieces of their individual estates. Each mansion is in a different architectural style popular in the early 20th century. They were originally built, as summer estates by some of America's most prominent and wealthy families, including the Mellons, Duponts, and Ladds.

It was added to the National Register of Historic Places in 1986.

== See also ==
- North Main Street Historic District
- Southampton Village Historic District
- Wickapogue Road Historic District
