= Southampton Village Historic District =

Historic district in New York, United States

- U.S. National Register of Historic Places
- U.S. Historic district
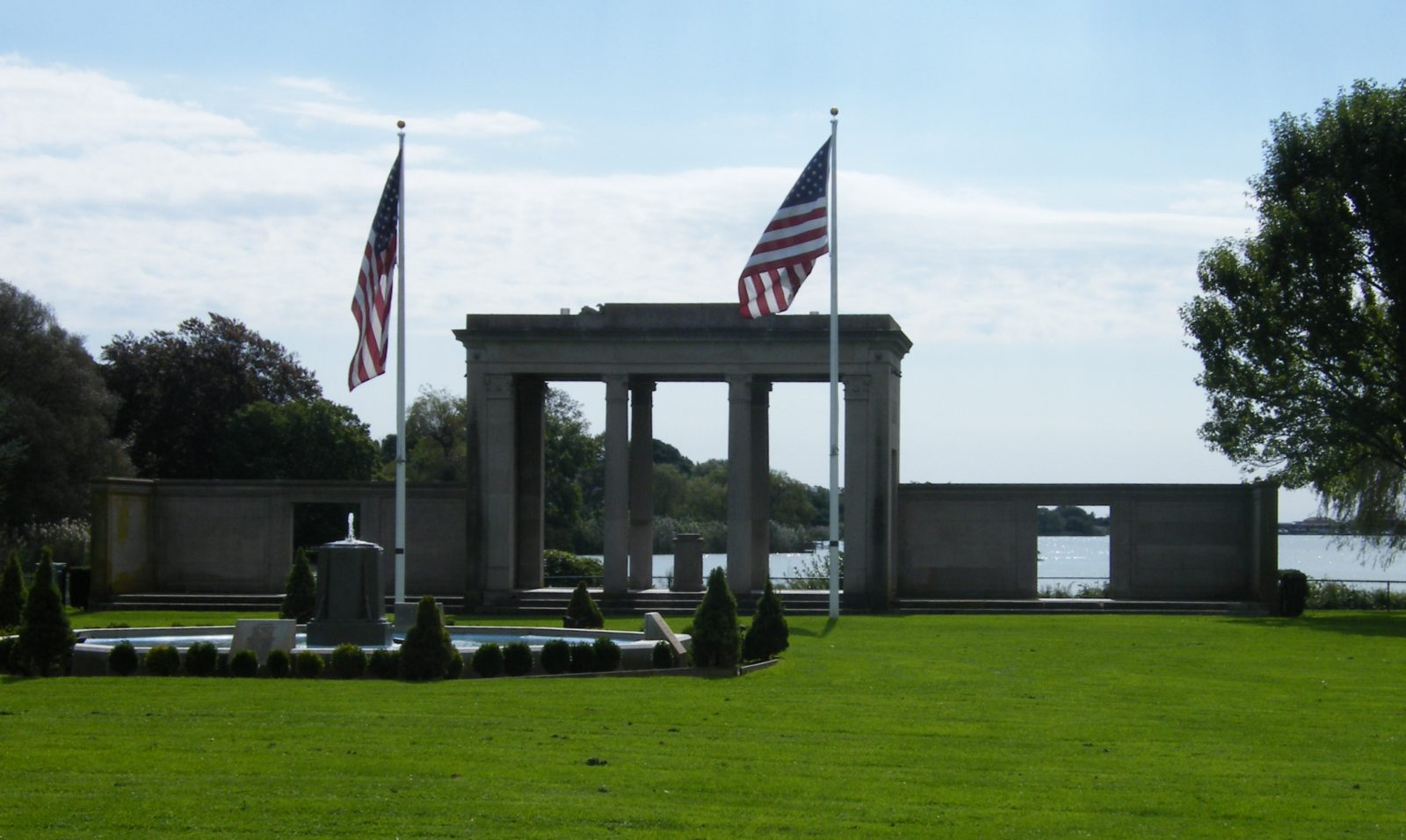
- Agwam Park, October 2008

- Location within New York Location within the United States
- Location: Roughly bounded by Hill and Main Sts., Old Town Rd., Atlantic Ocean, Coopers Neck and Halsey Neck Lns., (original); Roughly, along Rogers St., Lewis St. and Meeting House Ln. on E side of existing district (increase); Southampton, New York
- Coordinates: 40°52′37″N 72°23′35″W
- Architect: McKim, Mead & White; Et al. and unknown
- Architectural style: Mid 19th Century Revival, Late 19th And 20th Century Revivals, Late Victorian (original); Colonial Revival, Bungalow/Craftsman, Queen Anne (increase)
- MPS: Southampton Village MRA
- NRHP reference No.: 86002726 (original); 93000239 (increase)
- Added to NRHP: April 25, 1988 (original); April 12, 1993 (increase)

Southampton Village Historic District is a historic district in Southampton, New York, in Suffolk County.

It was listed on the National Register of Historic Places in 1988, and its boundaries were increased in 1993 by what was termed the Lewis Street Expansion Area.

It includes the James L. Breese House which is separately listed on the National Register.

== See also ==
- Beach Road Historic District
- North Main Street Historic District
- Wickapogue Road Historic District
