= Southampton (village), New York =

Southampton, New York
- Village; Town Seat of Southampton
- Incorporated Village of Southampton
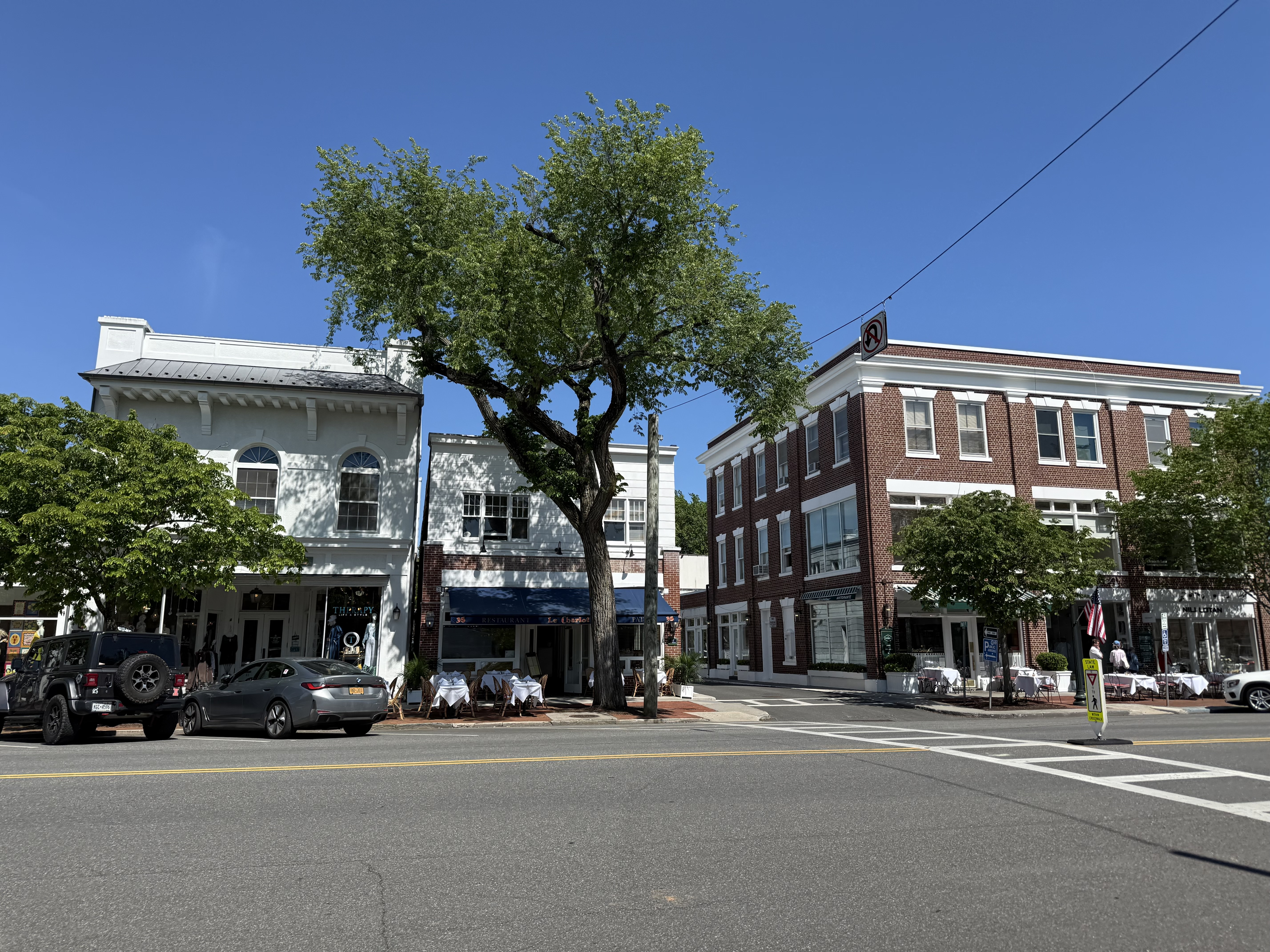
- Downtown Southampton in 2026

- Seal
- Etymology: Earl of Southampton
- Location on Long Island Location within the state of New York Location within the contiguous United States
- Coordinates: 40°53′7″N 72°23′43″W
- Country: United States
- State: New York
- County: Suffolk
- Town: Southampton
- First Settled: 1640
- Incorporation: 1894

Government
  - Mayor: William Manger

Area
  - Total: 7.43 sq mi (19.24 km^{2})
  - Land: 6.52 sq mi (16.88 km^{2})
  - Water: 0.91 sq mi (2.36 km^{2})
- Elevation: 26 ft (8 m)

Population (2020)
  - Total: 4,550
  - Density: 698.1/sq mi (269.52/km^{2})
- Time zone: UTC-5 (Eastern (EST))
  - Summer (DST): UTC-4 (EDT)
- ZIP Codes: 11968-11969
- Area codes: 631, 934
- FIPS code: 36-68462
- GNIS feature ID: 0965893
- Website: www.southamptonvillage.org

Southampton is an incorporated village in the Town of Southampton in Suffolk County, on the South Fork of Long Island, in New York, United States. The population was 4,550 at the 2020 census, an increase of 46.3% from the 2010 census a decade earlier.

The Incorporated Village of Southampton serves as the Town Seat of the Town of Southampton, and is the oldest and largest of communities in the summer colony known as The Hamptons.

== History ==
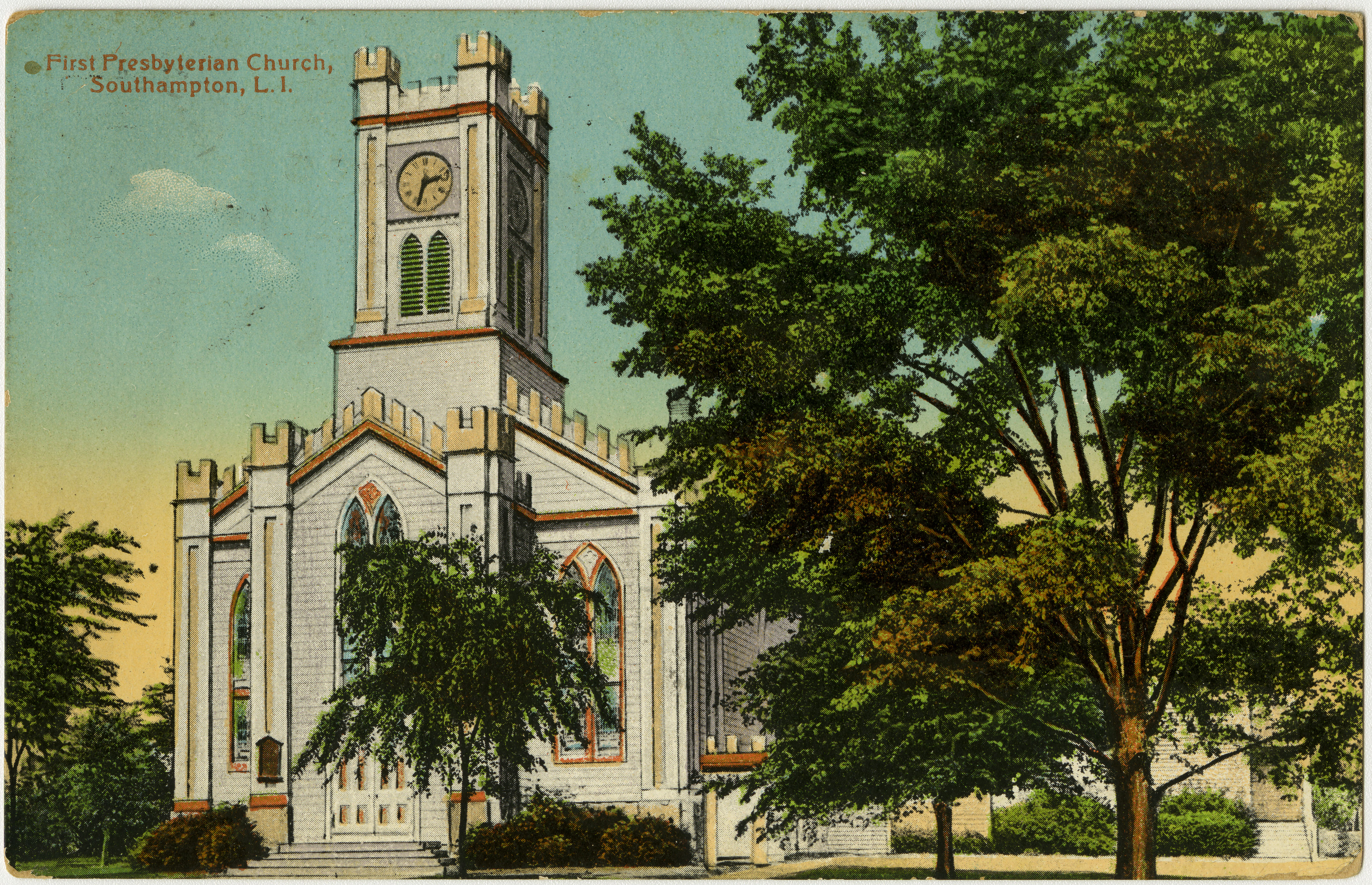
First Presbyterian Church, Main Street, Southampton, New York

Southampton, settled in 1640 and incorporated as a village in 1894, historically began with a small group of English settlers who set sail from Lynn, Massachusetts, and landed on June 12, 1640, at what is now known as Conscience Point. It is the oldest English settlement in the state of New York and is named after the English Earl of Southampton.

The Shinnecock tribe welcomed the arrival of the white settlers in 1640 and not only gave them land to live on, "Olde Towne", but also shared with the settlers their knowledge of planting corn and fertilizing it with fish, growing crops, digging clams and scallops from nearby bays and trapping game. During the 18th and 19th centuries, fishing, farming (especially potatoes and the local sweet corn) and duck raising were the predominant industries.

The early settlers, with the help of a resident Shinnecock Indian guide, were led over an old woodland trail that is now North Sea Road to an ideal spot for their first settlement. There, at the head of what today is Old Town Pond, they constructed their first homes. The Shinnecock Reservation, established in 1701, is one of the oldest Native American reservations in the United States.

A property called the Halsey House was a homestead by pioneer Thomas Halsey in 1640. A rare "first period" house was built in 1660 when Main Street, in the pioneer hamlet of Southampton, was first laid out. Its owner, Thomas Halsey, was one of the original families who bought property from the Shinnecocks in 1640. It is one of the oldest English-type frame houses in the state.

=== Summer Colony ===
Theodore Gaillard Thomas, a New York City physician is regarded at the founder of the resort community, also termed the Summer Colony, of Southampton. He convinced a number of his wealthy clients about the beauty and potential restorative nature of the rural environment of Southampton. His efforts to develop this resort community began in 1863. He proved very successful at establishing what grew into a very prominent and affluent community of summer residents. Thomas and his friends ultimately established many of the leading institutions in Southampton including the St. Andrews Dune Church, the Shinnecock Golf Club, the Meadow Club, the Southampton Beach Club and The Parrish Art Museum (now located in Water Mill, NY).

Over time, several of the other villages and hamlets in what has become called the Hamptons increasingly became a haven for affluent summer season vacationers. Southampton Village, which hosted the earliest summer community of socially prominent residents and was arguably the center for upper class Americans, grew larger and faster than the others. Southampton has served as home to members of the Ford, Du Pont, Morgan, Atterbury, Woolworth and Eisenhower families.

=== 21st century ===
Southampton Village is regarded as one of the premier summer resort areas in the country. The community of summer residents occupy the top echelon of American social, political and financial circles.

Accordingly, real estate is extremely expensive in the village, particularly in the southern half of the Village, the Estate Section. The Estate Section, which contains the majority of the homes for the very affluent residents, lies directly north of the Atlantic oceanfront and extends to Hill Street. Particular streets of note in the area include Ox Pasture Road, Halsey Neck Lane, Coopers Neck Lane, First Neck Lane, and South Main Street. The homes around Lake Agawam, referred to by Thomas as "the very center of our Summer Colony", are particularly noteworthy for their architectural pedigree and historical provenance.

The oceanfront roads—Gin Lane and Meadow Lane—are generally the most expensive roads in the village. Meadow Lane in particular has been called Billionaire Lane, and cited as having among the most expensive residential real estate in the country.

Southampton Village is also notable for its large number of private housing associations and private roads. While few are actually gated, these sub-communities which include the Murray-McDonnell compound, Pheasant's Close and Olde Towne contain dozens of expensive homes. Similarly the Fordune enclave (technically in Water Mill but primarily accessed from Wickapogue Road, the western boundary of Southampton Village), contains the historic Ford mansion as well as over fifty large estates, and is one of the largest and most prestigious private communities in the Hamptons.

Other areas in the village house the relatively large population of year-round residents. The village has the most diverse population in the Hamptons, including relatively large numbers of African Americans, Asians and Hispanics, both in percentage terms and absolute numbers. As it is the largest, most densely populated community in the Hamptons and the commercial and administrative center of the Town, there is a wider range of neighborhoods and types of housing in Southampton. This includes condominiums, single family houses, apartment buildings as well as the aforementioned estates closer to the ocean.

The Shinnecock Indian Reservation borders the village on its southwestern border. Shinnecock Hills Golf Club one of the oldest and most prestigious golf courses in the country, borders the village on its northwest corner. The Art Village, a summer art school started by William Merritt Chase and funded by early residents of the Southampton Summer Colony, is still in existence, though now it is entirely private residences.

There are several working farms and agricultural preserves in the village. Most of those properties are located in the Estate Section, particularly in the Wickapogue Road Historic District.

Southampton Village boasts well regarded ocean beaches including Cooper's Beach, which was featured as New York's representative beach in a 2026 ranking of U.S. states by the number of natural beaches. In 2010, it was listed as "America's top beach", according to the annual list of the best American beaches compiled by Stephen Leatherman, AKA Dr. Beach.

== Geography ==
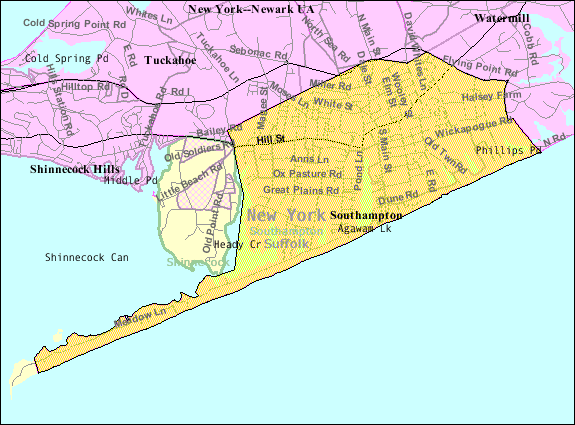
U.S. Census map of Southampton

According to the United States Census Bureau, the village has a total area of 7.2 square miles (18.7 km^{2}), of which 6.4 square miles (16.6 km^{2}) is land and 0.81 square miles (2.1 km^{2}), or 11.03%, is water.

The village gained territory between the 1990 census and the 2000 census; the Southampton CDP that existed in 1990 was deleted and most of its territory went to two adjacent CDPs.

== Demographics ==
Historical population
Census	Pop.	Note	%±
1870	943		—
1880	949		0.6%
1900	2,289		—
1910	2,509		9.6%
1920	2,891		15.2%
1930	3,737		29.3%
1940	3,818		2.2%
1950	4,042		5.9%
1960	4,582		13.4%
1970	4,904		7.0%
1980	4,000		−18.4%
1990	3,980		−0.5%
2000	3,965		−0.4%
2010	3,109		−21.6%
2020	4,550		46.3%
U.S. Decennial Census

=== 2017 American Community Survey ===
According to US Census estimates as of March 2017, there were 3,193 people in the village. The population density was 498.9 inhabitants per square mile (192.6/km^{2}). The racial makeup of the village was 74.5% White, 16.7% Black or African American, 0.4% Native American, 3.60% Asian, 0.03% Pacific Islander, 4.40% from other races, and 0.90% from two or more races. Hispanic or Latino of any race were 22.5% of the population.

In the village, the population was spread out, with 16.2% under the age of 19, 1.7% from 18 to 24, 12.4% from 19 to 34, 39.8% from 35 to 64, and 29.9% who were 65 years of age or older. The median age was 55.2 years. The Village's residents were estimated to be 46% male and 54% female.

Also, as per the 2015 Census Data estimates, the median income for a household in the village was $96,250 and the median income for a family was $109,674. Twenty two percent of the households in the Village earned over $200,000.

As per the 2000 Census, there were 1,651 households, out of which 21.9% had children under the age of 18 living with them, 42.1% were married couples living together, 12.1% had a female householder with no husband present, and 40.5% were non-families. 34.2% of all households were made up of individuals, and 15.4% had someone living alone who was 65 years of age or older. The average household size was 2.36 and the average family size was 2.97.

=== Census 2000 ===
As of the census of 2000, there were 3,965 people, 1,651 households, and 982 families residing in the village. The population density was 626.7 inhabitants per square mile (242.0/km^{2}). There were 2,936 housing units at an average density of 464.0 units per square mile (179.2 units/km^{2}). The racial makeup of the village was 80.38% White, 12.94% Black or African American, 0.83% Native American, 1.59% Asian, 0.03% Pacific Islander, 1.97% from other races, and 2.27% from two or more races. Hispanic or Latino of any race were 9.05% of the population.

Out of a total of 1,651 households, 21.9% had children under the age of 18 living with them, 42.1% were married couples living together, 12.1% had a female householder with no husband present, and 40.5% were non-families. 34.2% of all households were made up of individuals and 15.4% had someone living alone who was 65 years of age or older. The average household size was 2.36 and the average family size was 2.97.

In the village the population was spread out with 19.5% under the age of 18, 7.3% from 18 to 24, 24.8% from 25 to 44, 27.2% from 45 to 64, and 21.1% who were 65 years of age or older. The median age was 44 years. For every 100 females there were 93.6 males. For every 100 females age 18 and over, there were 91.6 males.

The median income for a household in the village was $54,030, and the median income for a family was $61,016. Males had a median income of $40,729 versus $36,875 for females. The per capita income for the village was $37,015. About 1.3% of families and 6.2% of the population were below the poverty line, including 2.6% of those under age 18 and 3.9% of those age 65 or over.

== Government ==
As of July 2023, the Mayor of the Village of Southampton is William "Bill" Manger Jr.

From July 2019 through July 2023, the Mayor was Jesse Warren. At the time of his election, the then-37-year-old became the village's youngest mayor ever.

=== Village police ===
This area is policed by the Southampton Village Police Department.

== Historic districts ==
- Beach Road Historic District
- North Main Street Historic District
- Southampton Village Historic District
- Wickapogue Road Historic District

== Notable residents ==
Many wealthy and influential people have homes in the "estate section" of the village, the area immediately north of the Atlantic Ocean front. Southampton has historically been home to prominent residents including members of the Ford, Du Pont, Eisenhower, Vanderbilt and Morgan families. Today, the village is itself home to approximately half of the billionaires who have residences in the eight hamlets and villages that constitute the Hamptons.

Other notable residents include:

- Tim Bishop, former U.S. Representative for New York's 1st congressional district
- Elizabeth Bogart, 19th-century poet
- Aby Rosen, real estate mogul
- Ian Schrager, hotelier
- Tory Burch, fashion designer, business woman, and philanthropist
- Brooke Shields, actress
- Amanda Clark, Olympic sailor
- Pyrrhus Concer, First African American whaler to reach restricted Japan and Southampton Village ferryboat operator
- Ansel Elgort, actor
- Michael J. Fox, actor
- Paul Gibson, Major League Baseball pitcher
- Grenville Goodwin, anthropologist
- Jehiel H. Halsey, lawyer and politician
- Nicoll Halsey, U.S. Representative
- Silas Halsey, U.S. Representative
- Andre Johnson, NFL football player
- Calvin Klein, fashion designer
- David H. Koch, businessman
- Henry Kravis, financier
- Edward Mellon architect
- Steven Mnuchin, financier and US Treasury Secretary
- J. P. Morgan, financier
- Roy Lichtenstein, painter
- Adebayo Ogunlesi, financier and founder of Global Infrastructure Partners
- John Paulson
- Lee Radziwill
- Felix Rohatyn, financier who saved New York City from bankruptcy in the 1970s
- Wilbur Ross, billionaire investor and US Commerce Secretary
- William Salomon
- Arthur Ochs "Punch" Sulzberger Sr., former publisher of The New York Times
- Chuck Scarborough, longstanding news anchor
- Jean Shafiroff, philanthropist and socialite
- George Soros, business magnate, investor, and philanthropist
- Kate Spade
- Howard Stein, financier
- Howard Stern radio personality
- Carlos Eduardo Stolk, diplomat, business magnate
- A. Alfred Taubman, real estate developer and philanthropist
- Foots Walker, NBA basketball player
- Tom Wolfe, author and journalist

== Image gallery ==
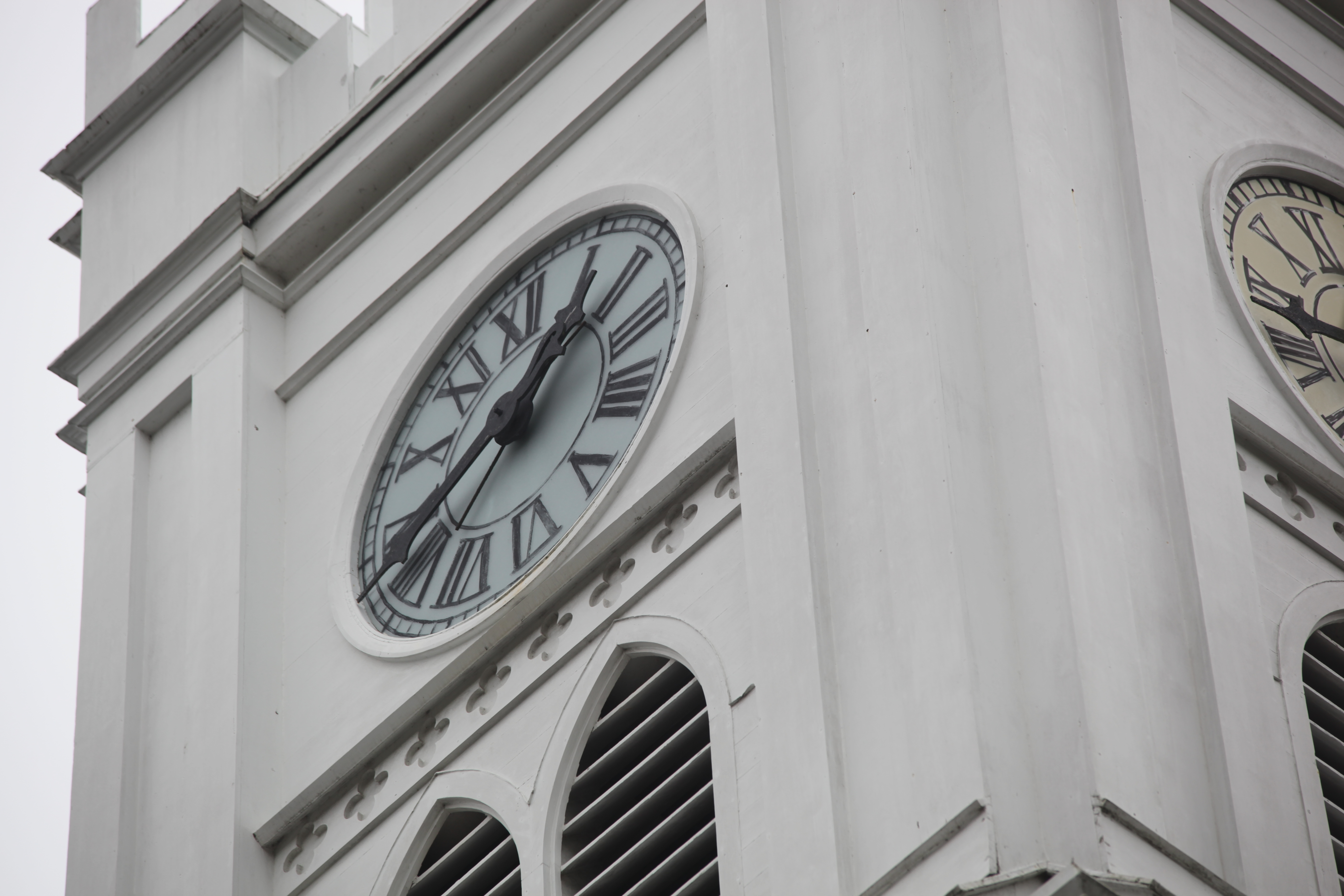
First Presbyterian Church – Oldest Presbyterian church in America was established in 1640 by Puritans from Lynn, Mass. Clock tower on wood gothic church built in 1843 and enlarged in 1895.

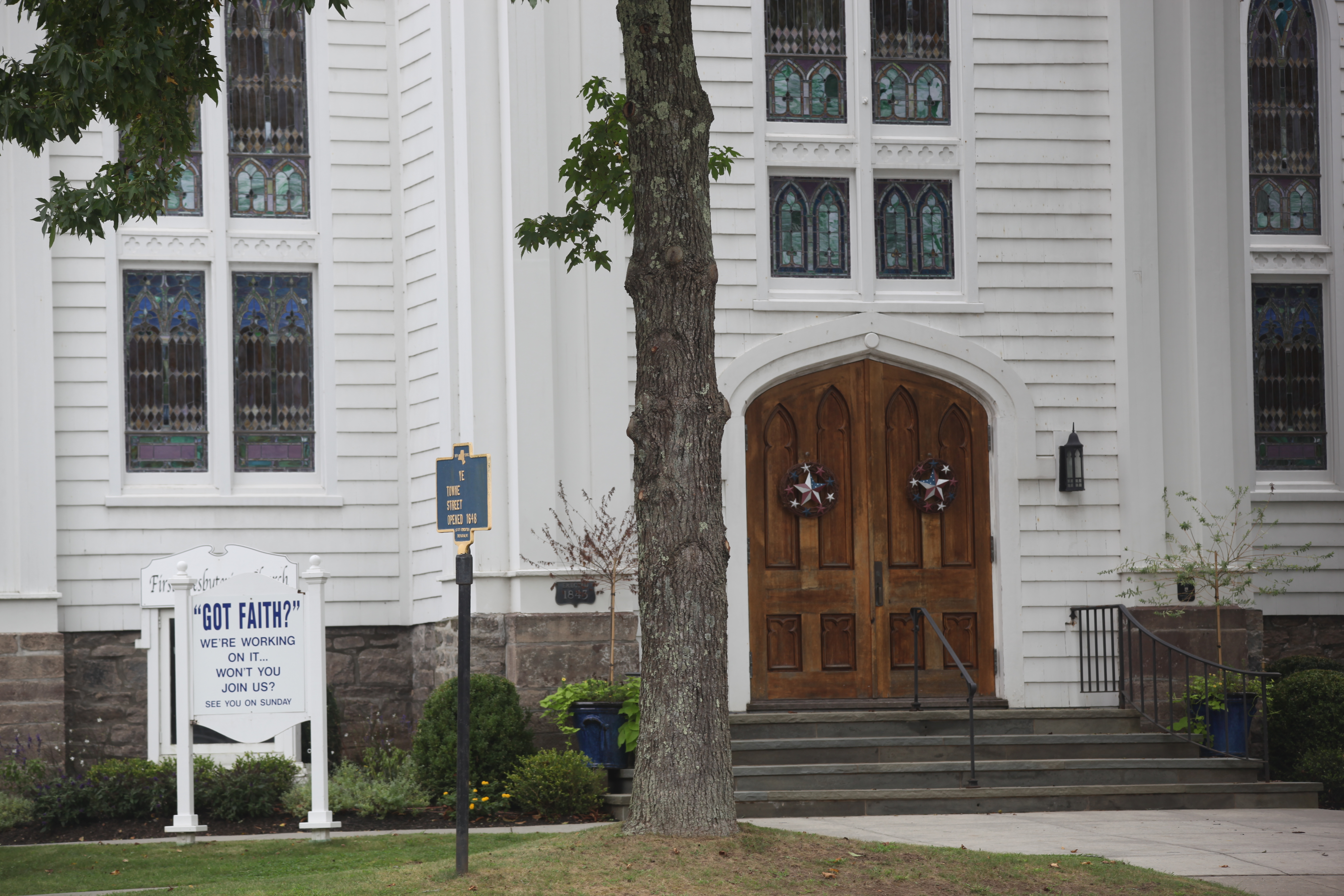
First Presbyterian Church – Southampton Village on Main St.

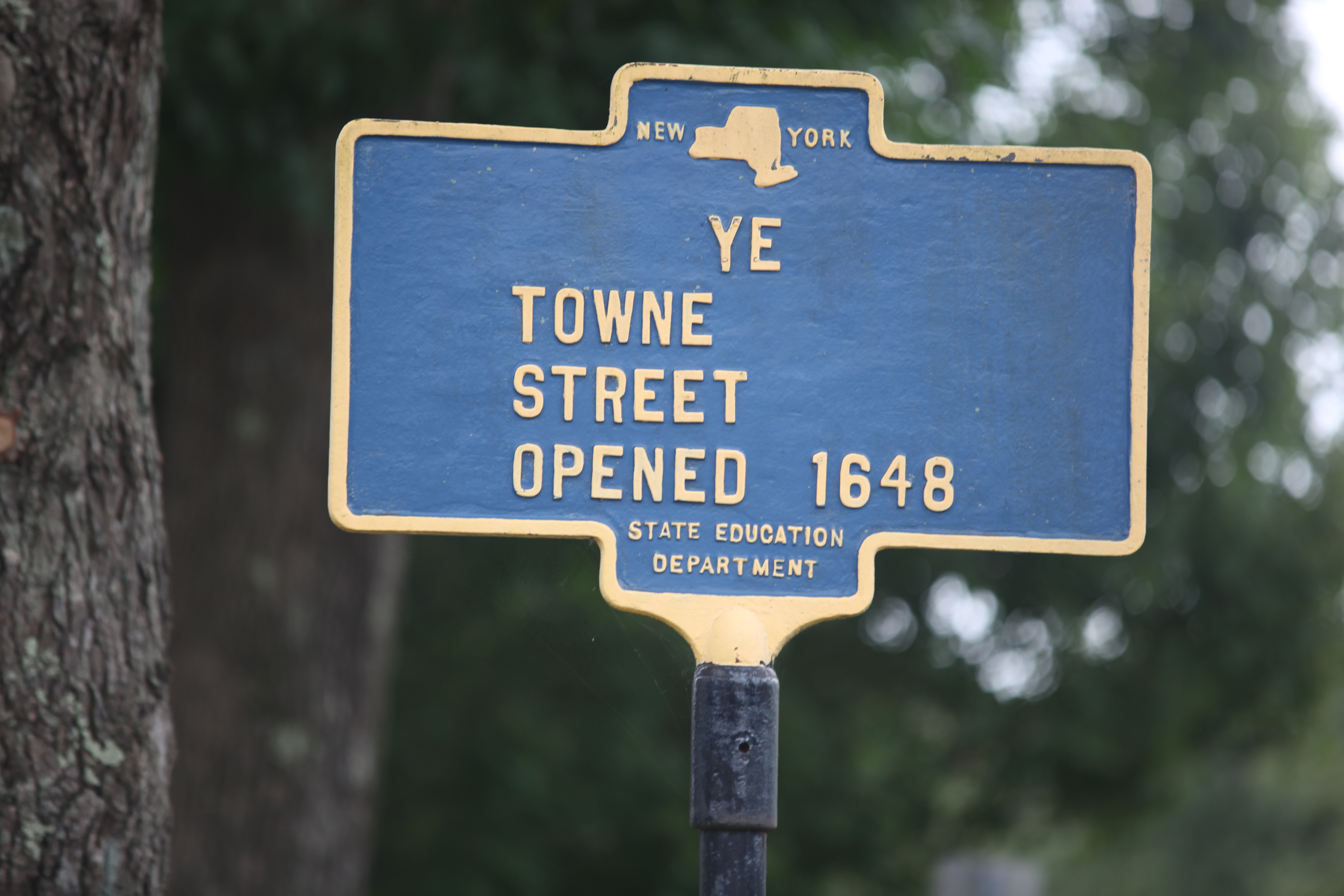
Southampton Village on South Main St. 2 main st Plaque

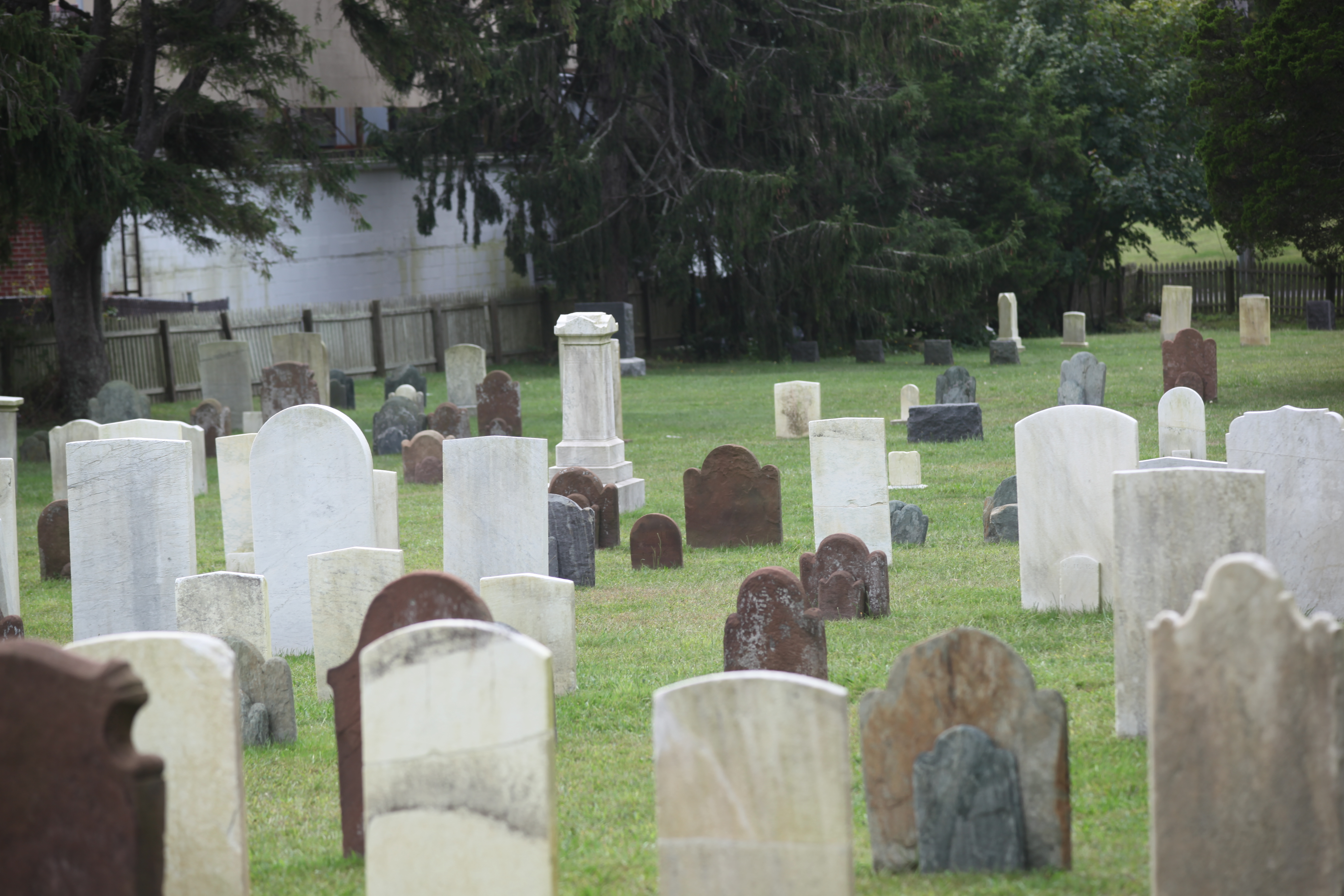
North End Graveyard, it contains the graves of many veterans of the revolutionary war.

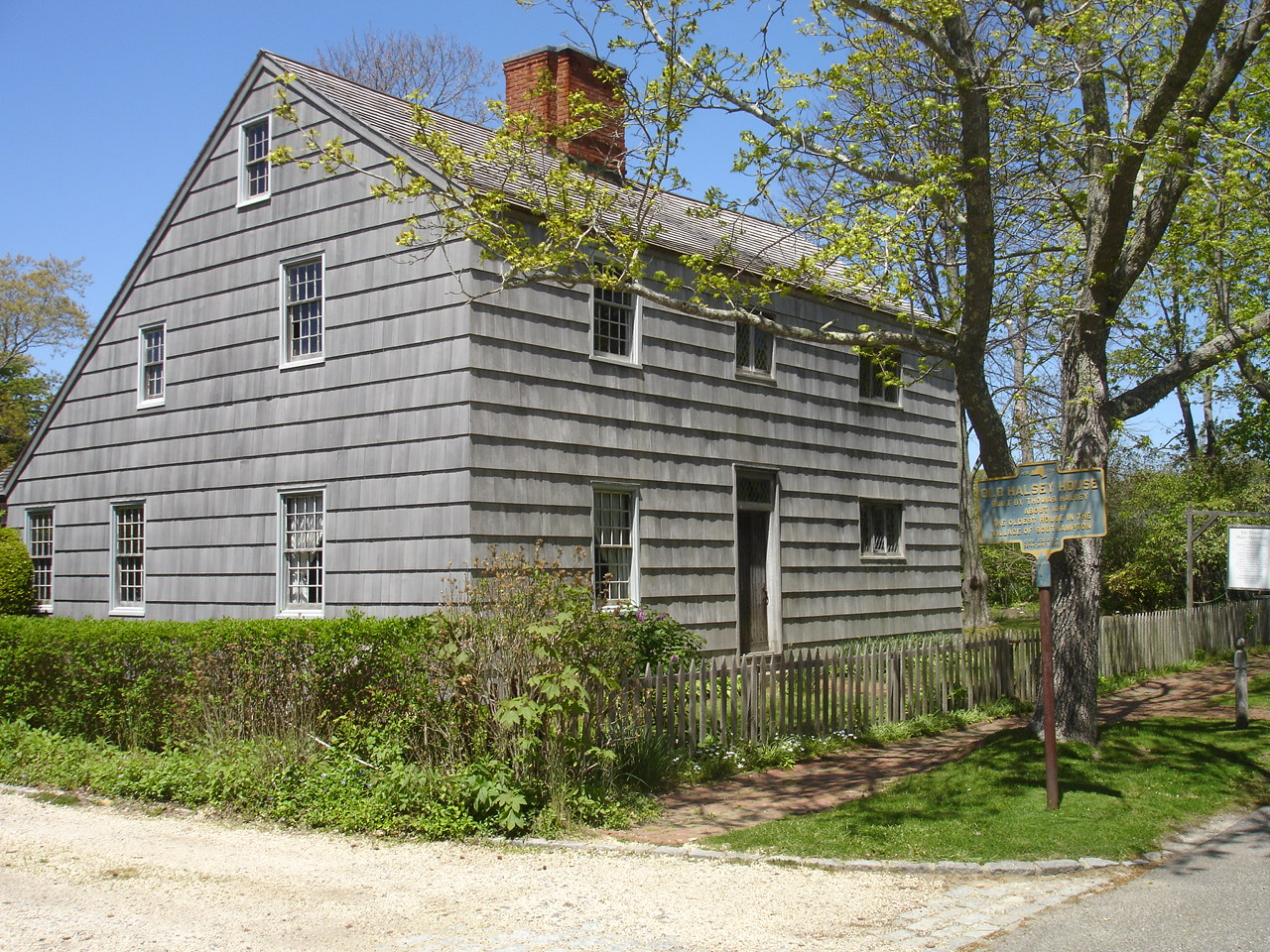
The Old Halsey House in the spring of 2011

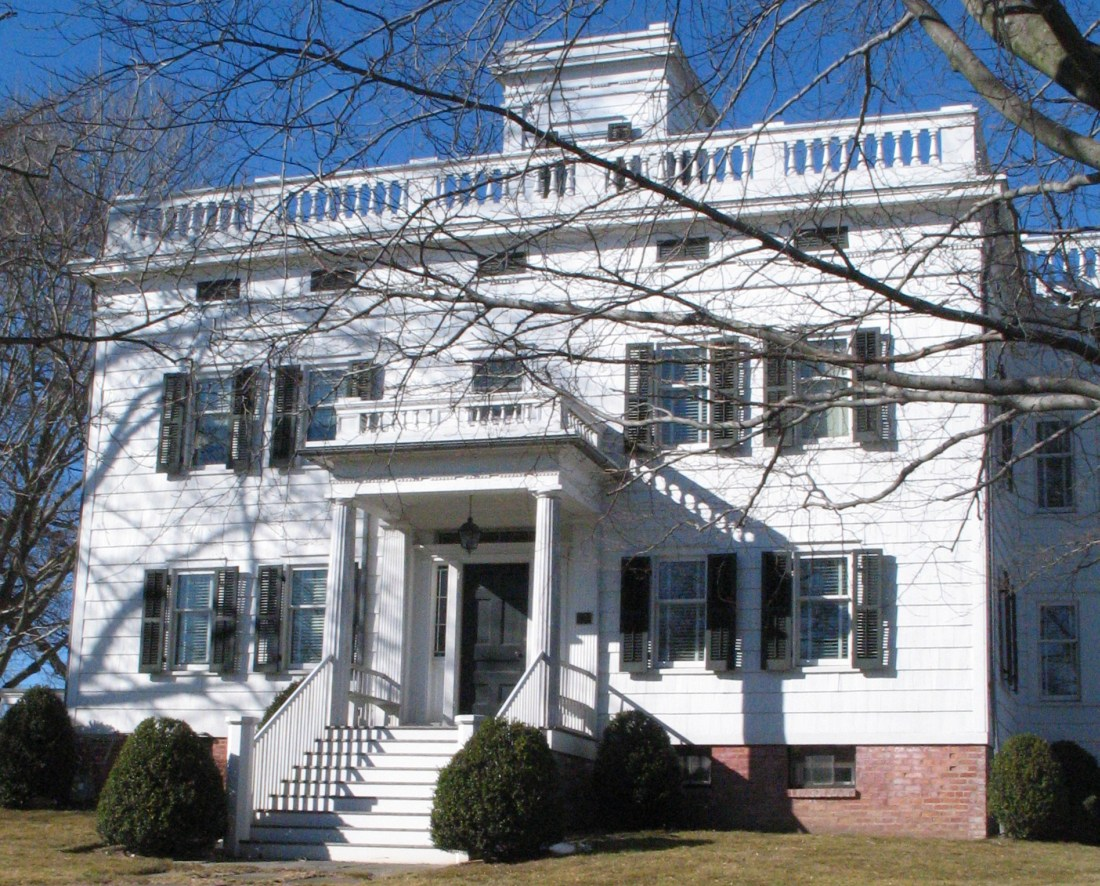
Mercator Cooper house in Southampton. The house is now used by the town library.
