= Horsford (surname) =

Horsford is a surname, and may refer to:

- Sir Alfred Horsford (1818–1885), British Army officer
- Anna Maria Horsford (born 1948), American actress
- Cornelia Horsford (1861–1944), American archaeologist
- Cyril Horsford (1876–1953), British surgeon
- Derek Horsford (1917–2007), British Army officer
- Eben Norton Horsford (1818–1893), American scientist
- Jerediah Horsford (1791–1875), American politician
- Sir John Horsford (1751–1817), British soldier
- Mary Gardiner Horsford (1824–1855), American poet
- Sonya Douglass Horsford, American academic
- Steven Horsford (born 1973), American politician
- Tamla Horsford (died 2018), American murder victim
- Walter Horsford (died 1898), English murderer
