= Sylvester Manor =

- U.S. National Register of Historic Places
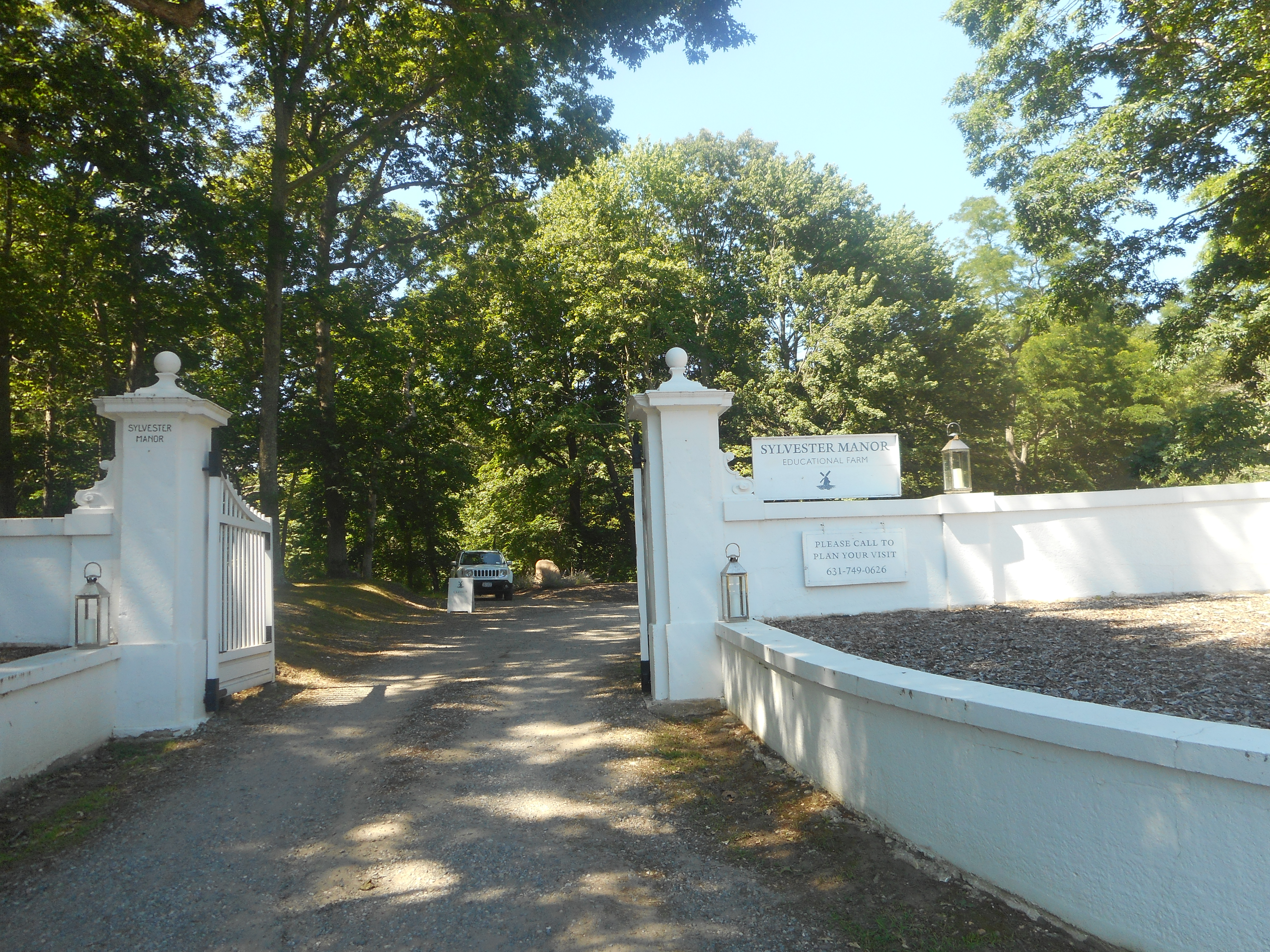
- The gateway to Sylvester Manor

- Location within New York Location within the United States
- Location: Shelter Island, New York, USA
- Coordinates: 41°04′49.4″N 72°20′28″W
- Built: c. 1737
- NRHP reference No.: 15000178
- Added to NRHP: April 28, 2015

Sylvester Manor is a historic manor on Shelter Island in Suffolk County, New York, USA.

== History ==
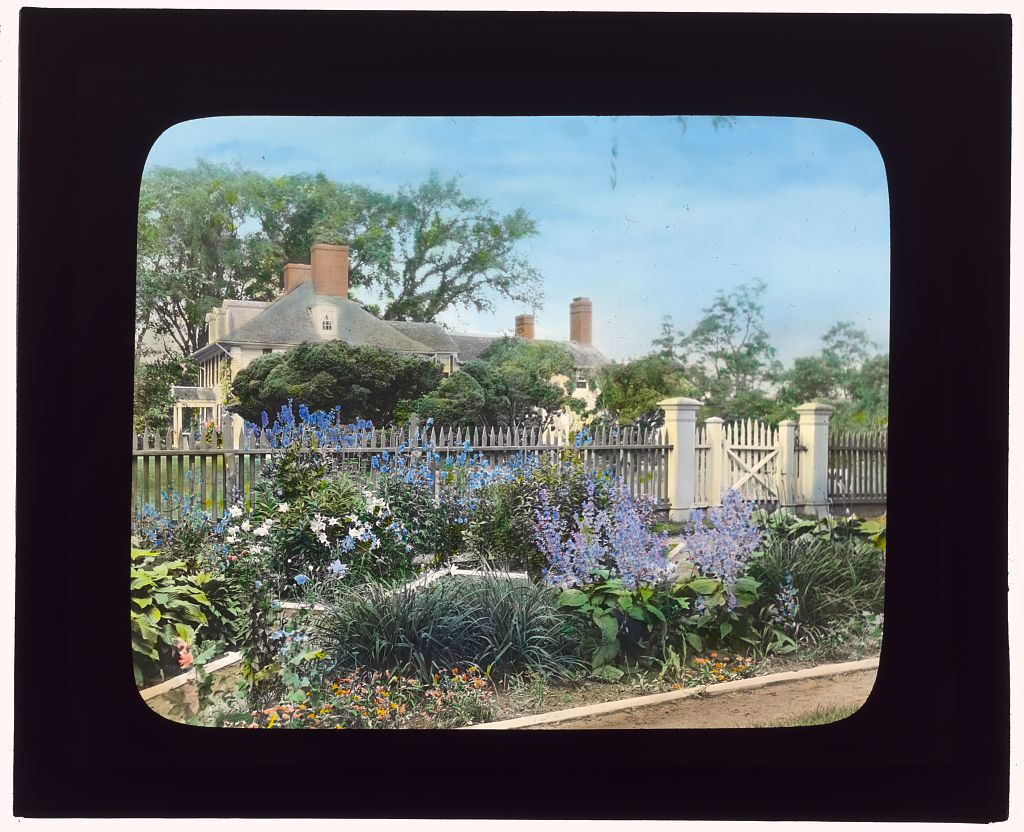
Circa 1915 postcard of the manor

The land, spanning 8,000 acres on Shelter Island, was acquired by English-born colonist Nathaniel Sylvester in the 17th century. Sylvester and his brother owned two plantations in Barbados and over 200 enslaved Africans. When he died in 1680, the estate and 23 enslaved people were inherited by his descendants.

The manor on the estate was built in 1737 for Nathaniel Sylvester's grandson, Brinley Sylvester. Enslaved Africans and European indentured servants built it. The last enslaved person was freed in 1820. The grounds include a cemetery of unmarked graves for enslaved people.

Later, the manor was inherited by Mary Gardiner Horsford, the wife of renowned Harvard University professor Eben Norton Horsford after her mother brought it back into the family. They entertained often, one of their guests being Henry Wadsworth Longfellow. After her death, he married her sister, Phoebe Dayton Gardiner, with whom he had a fifth daughter, Cornelia Horsford.

In recent years, it was the home of heiress Alice Fiske. More recently, it was inherited by an 11th generation descendant, Bennett Konesni. With his uncle, Eben Fiske Ostby, he co-founded the Sylvester Manor Educational Farm with the help of the Peconic Land Trust.

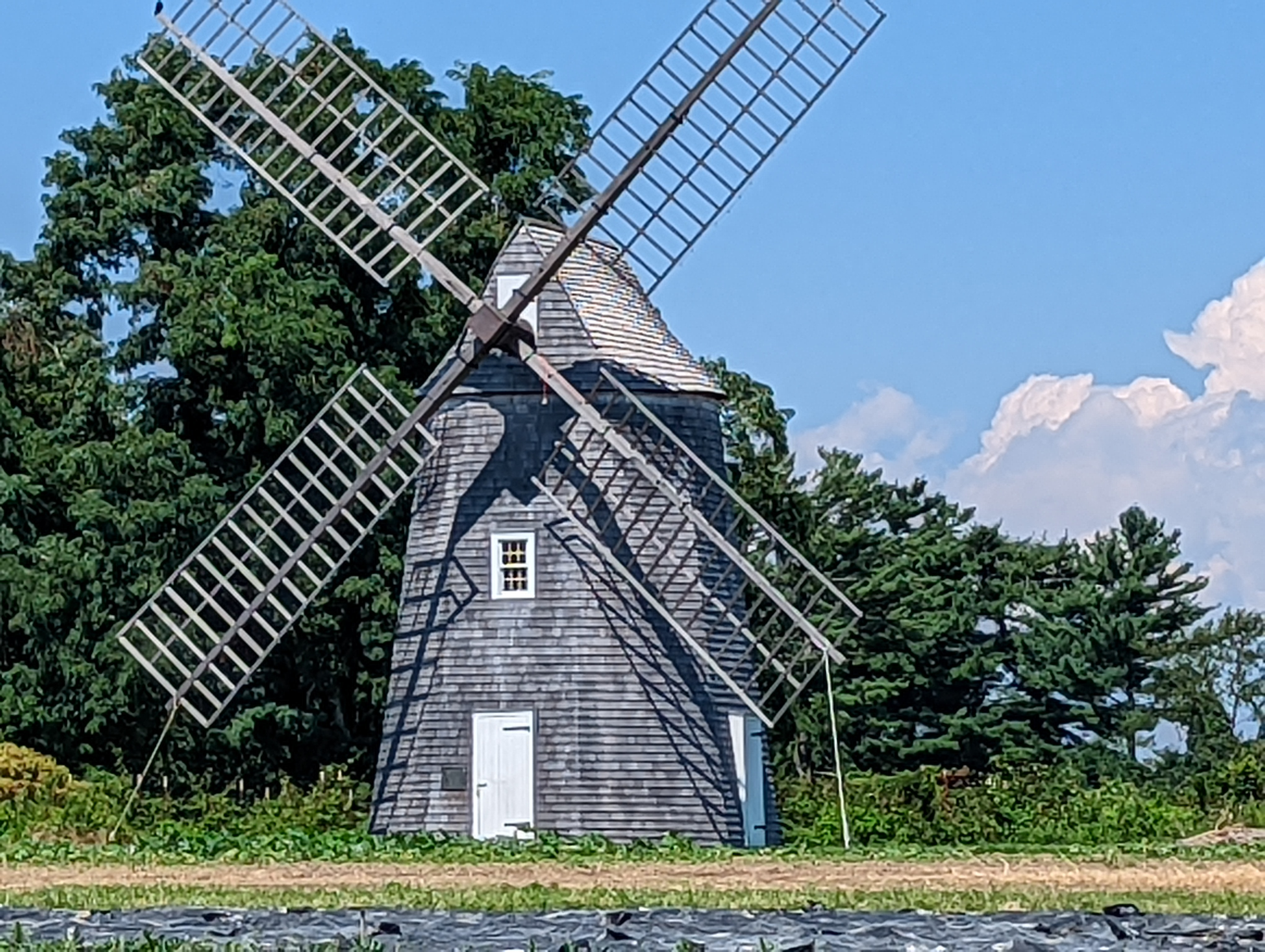
Shelter Island Windmill 20220820 170332666

== Architectural significance ==
The manor has been listed on the National Register of Historic Places since April 28, 2015.

== See also ==
- Shelter Island Windmill
- Orient windmills
- Aquebogue Windmill

== Bibliography ==
- Mac Griswold. The Manor: Three Centuries at a Slave Plantation on Long Island (New York City: Farrar, Straus & Giroux, 2013).
- Katherine Howlett Hayes. Slavery before Race Europeans, Africans, and Indians at Long Island's Sylvester Manor Plantation, 1651-1884 (New York City: NYU Press, 2013).
