= Nathaniel Sylvester =

Anglo-Dutch Sugar planter and merchant (1610–1680)

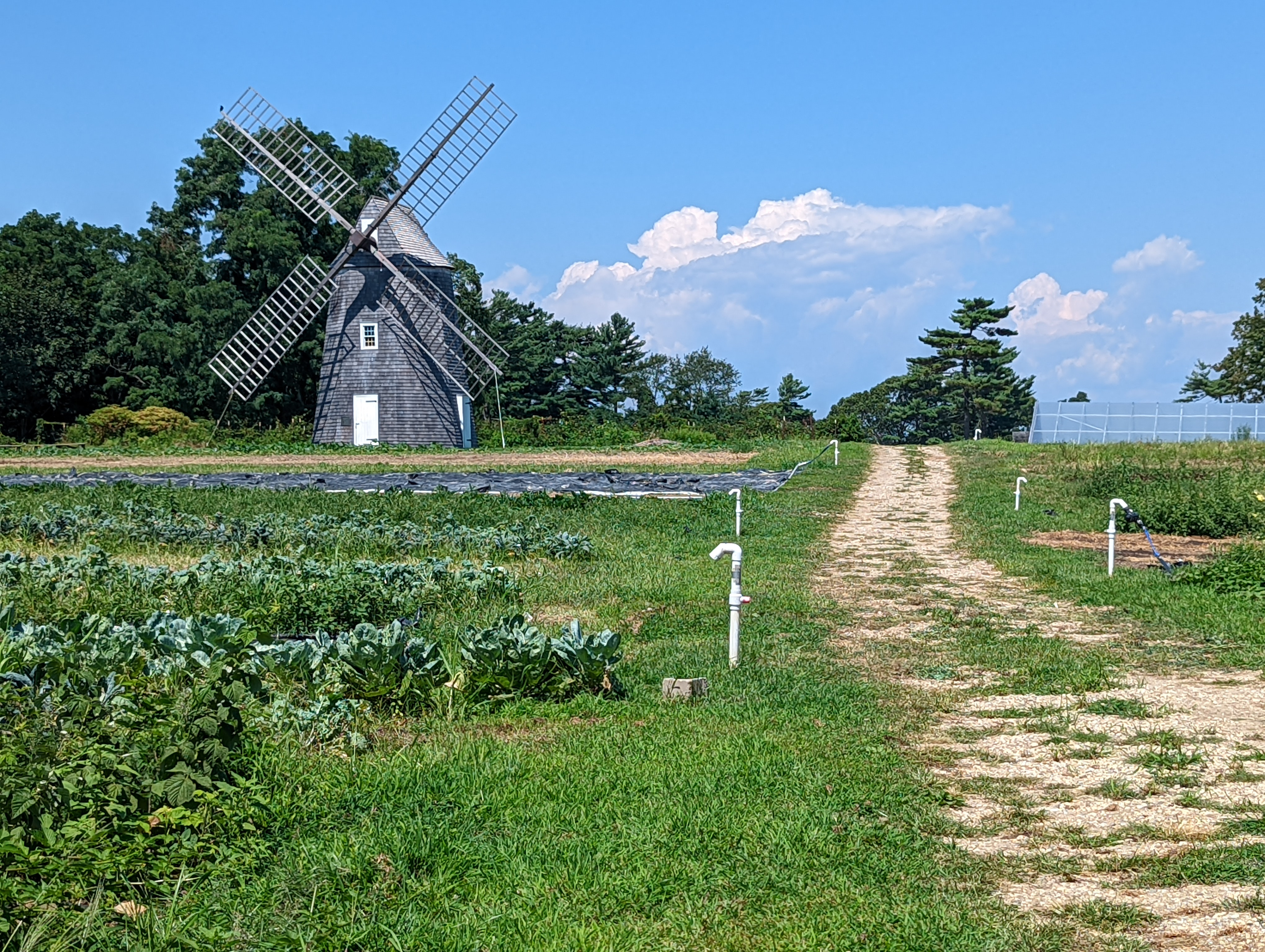
- Born: 1610; England
- Died: 1680 (aged 69–70)
- Occupations: Sugar planter, merchant
- Spouse: Grisell Brinley
- Relatives: William Coddington (brother-in-law)

Nathaniel Sylvester (1610–1680) was an Anglo-Dutch sugar merchant, enslaver, and the first European settler of Shelter Island.

== Early life ==
Nathaniel Sylvester was born in 1610 in England. His family lived in exile in Holland before he emigrated to English America during the English Civil War and Anglo-Dutch War.

== Career ==
In June 1651, with his brother, Constant, and partners Thomas Middleton and Thomas Rouse, he purchased the whole of Shelter Island first from a non-resident Englishman and then again the following year from the Manhanset Indians, whose sachem, or chief, was called "Yoki." Nathaniel was the only one of the partners who lived on a Shelter Island; he eventually bought out his partners' shares. The Shelter Island enterprise involved barrel-making, using the stands of local white oak for shipping the West Indies tobacco, sugar, molasses and rum back to England. The family enslaved Africans, along with employing Native Americans and others, to help run the plantation, the largest such operation in the north.

== Personal life ==
Coat of Arms of Nathaniel Sylvester

Between 6 July (date of marriage jointure) and 8 August 1653 (date of letter mentioning his changed condition because of marriage), he married Grizzell Brinley, daughter of Thomas Brinley, one of the Auditors General of the Revenues for Charles I, and later for Charles II. Grizzell was a younger sister of Anne Brinley, who in England had married Governor William Coddington of Rhode Island in January 1650. When the Coddingtons returned to Rhode Island in mid-1651, Grizzell came along as a ward of Coddington. Grizzell and Anne's brother, Francis, would join his sisters in the New World, fleeing Cromwell's England and establishing the American Brinleys in Newport, RI, and Boston, Mass. Another Brinley sister, Mary, would marry Nathaniel's brother, Peter Sylvester. The Sylvesters were friends with Quaker founder George Fox, whom he entertained on at least one occasion on Shelter Island. They offered a place of refuge for several of the persecuted early Quakers in New England when it was dangerous to do so. Sylvester died in 1680.

== Legacy ==
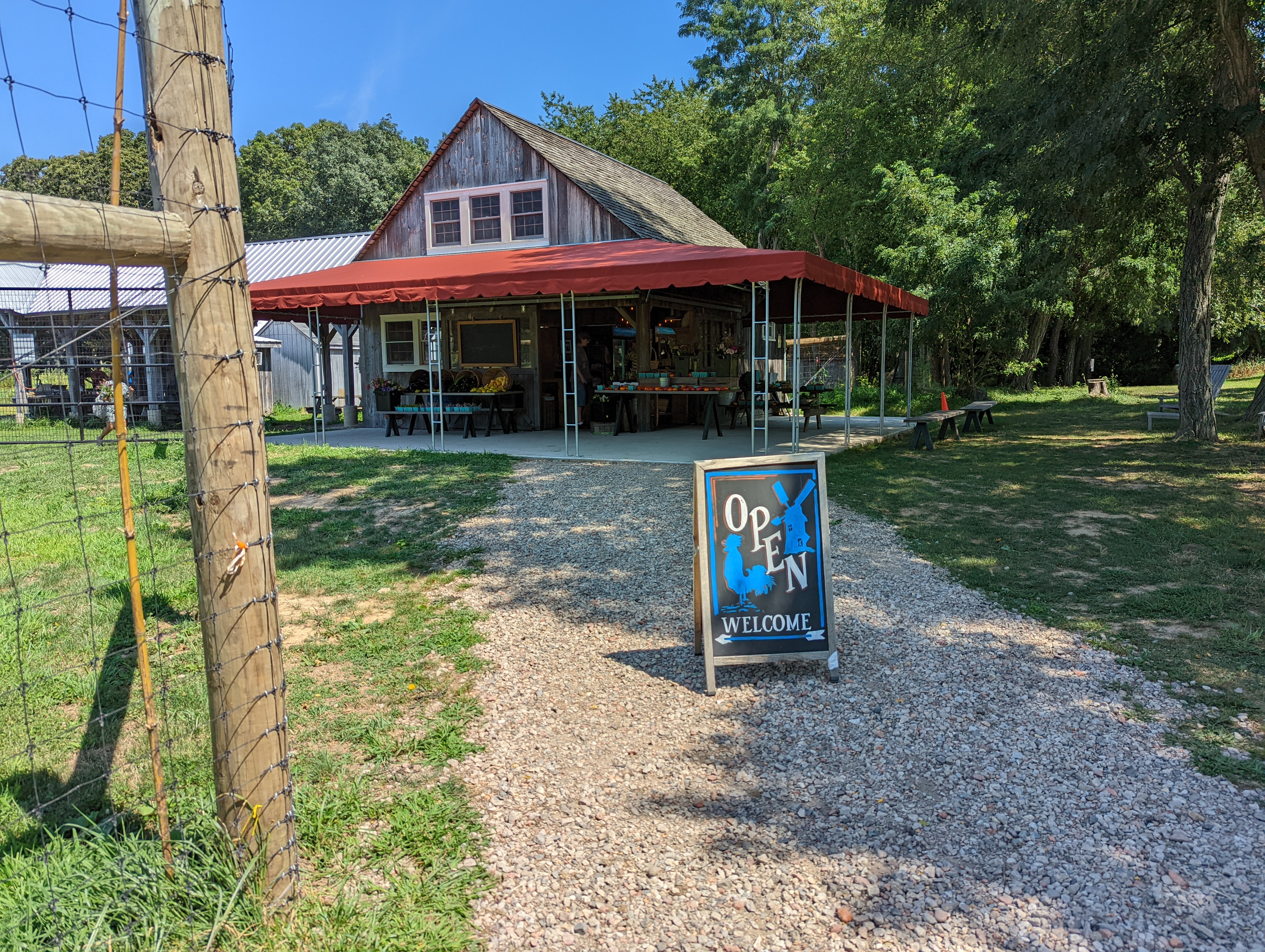
Sylvester Manor Farmstand 20220820 171804690

His grandson, Brinley Sylvester, replaced the existing home and built Sylvester Manor on Shelter Island in 1737, which remained standing and stayed in the family until 2006. Master Millwright Nathaniel Dominy V (1770–1852) was the architect and builder of the windmill that was a significant part of the plantation history from 1810-1824. In the 19th century, Eben Norton Horsford, a Harvard professor and chemist who made a fortune with his invention of baking soda, married into the family. His first wife, Mary L'Hommedieu Gardiner, had the windmill moved to its current location north of Manwaring Road. She was responsible for creating the gardens at the manor. After her early death, Horsford married her younger sister, Phoebe Dayton Gardiner. Their mother, Mary Catherine L'Hommedieu Gardiner, had repurchased the manor for the family in 1827 at a public auction. One of the largest plantations in the north, it was home to many enslaved people from the Caribbean along with Native Americans and indentured persons. Its burial ground was the recipient of a Guggenheim grant in 2004 to study the history of Long Island. An 11th generation descendant, Eben Otsby, and his nephew, Bennet Konesni, turned it into a non-profit educational farm.

A contemporary archaeological dig from 1999 to 2005, called the Sylvester Manor Project, a project overseen by the University of Massachusetts Boston, seeks to shed light on the Sylvester estate as it existed in the 17th and 18th centuries.
