= Shelter Island Windmill =

- U.S. National Register of Historic Places
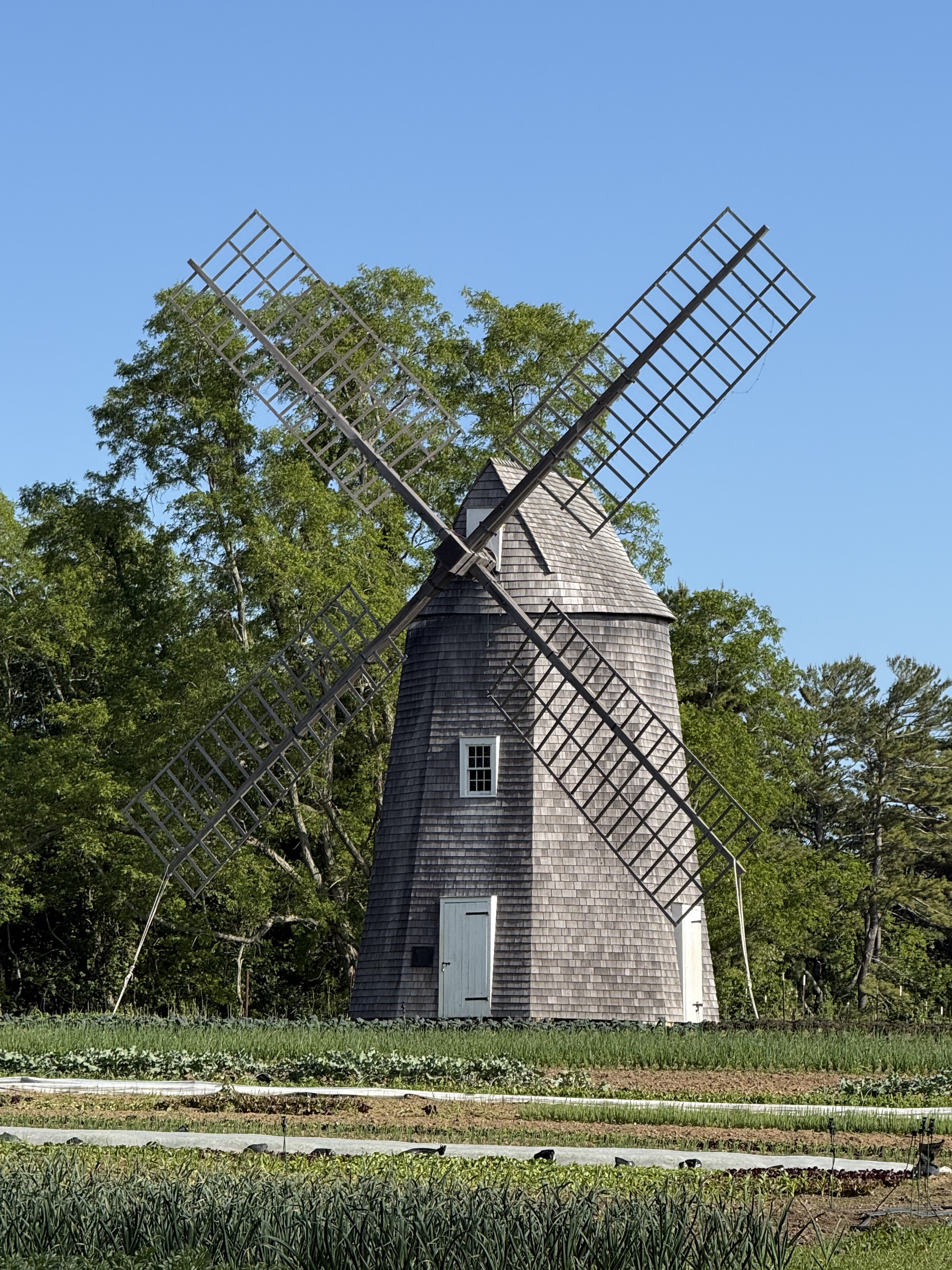
- Shelter Island Windmill in June 2026

- Location within New York Location within the United States
- Location: Shelter Island, New York, USA
- Coordinates: 41°4′33″N 72°20′8″W
- Area: 1 acre (0.40 ha)
- Built: 1810
- Architect: Dominy, Nathaniel V
- MPS: Long Island Wind and Tide Mills TR
- NRHP reference No.: 78001917
- Added to NRHP: December 27, 1978

Shelter Island Windmill is an historic windmill north of Manwaring Road in Shelter Island, Suffolk County, New York. It was built in 1810. Master Millwright Nathaniel Dominy V (1770–1852) was the architect and builder of the windmill. The windmill has been on Shelter Island since 1840 and at its current location since 1926 on the Sylvester Manor farm.

== History ==
The Old Red Mill that was formerly in Southold on the Peconic River now rests on the Sylvester Manor property on Shelter Island. The Old Red Mill at the mouth of Jockey Creek was an impressive structure that stood out from other mills in the area. Its tall, slender design and octagonal shape made it a unique landmark in the community. The mill's rotating dome and arms created a distinctive sound that could be heard from a distance, adding to its mystique.

According to Dr. J. G. Huntting, Dick Albertson was the man who operated the mill, and he was known for his skill and dedication to the craft. Despite competition from other mills, including the water mill at Peconic, Albertson managed to keep the Old Red Mill in business.

The Old Red Mill was then bought for $200 in 1840 by Joseph Congdon of Shelter Island, and it was then transported across Peconic Bay in pieces by an ox team and barge. Between 1840 and 1841, the Dutch windmill was reassembled and became operational in the latter year. For the next 38 years, the mill was used by various owners for grinding purposes. However, it stood still for nearly 40 years until it was revived during World War I by Miss Cornelia Horsford, who owned it at that time. After the war, it was no longer used and was eventually purchased in 1926 by Sylvester Fiske. Fiske moved the windmill from its original location near the center of town to his estate, Sylvester Manor, in Shelter Island, where it remains to this day.

== Legacy ==
The Shelter Island Windmill (Sylvester's Mill) is one of eleven surviving 18th and early-19th century wind-powered gristmills on Long Island. The mill was built in 1810 at Southold for a company whose partners were Benjamin Horton, Nathaniel Overton, Moses Cleveland, Barnabas Case and Joseph Halliock. It operated year-round grinding wheat, buckwheat, corn, rye, meslin and provender for locals. Partner Moses Cleveland, a carpenter, performed routine maintenance and repairs on the mill during its heyday 1821–1823.

The windmill was purchased in 1840 by Joseph Congdon and moved to Shelter Island where it stood at the center of the village, near the library and high school. Lore was that the mill was moved to Shelter Island to replace another which had burnt, there was no need for a new grist-mill by 1840. Congdon, who was a miller, operated the windmill until about 1855 when it was sold to Smith Baldwin. The mill ceased to operate sometime before 1879 when Lillian Horsford, purchased it to preserve it as an antique. The mill was put back in operation during 1917–1918 to provide meal and flour for the inhabitants of the Island during the food conservation period of the First World War. In 1926 Miss Cornelia Horsford moved the mill to the grounds of Sylvester Manor, where it remains today.

== NRHP ==
It was added to the National Register of Historic Places in 1978. It is a part of the Sylvester Manor's educational farm.

== See also ==
- List of windmills in New York
- Orient windmills
