= Norumbega Tower =

Stone tower in Weston, Massachusetts

Coordinates: 42°21′12.20″N 71°15′43.6″W

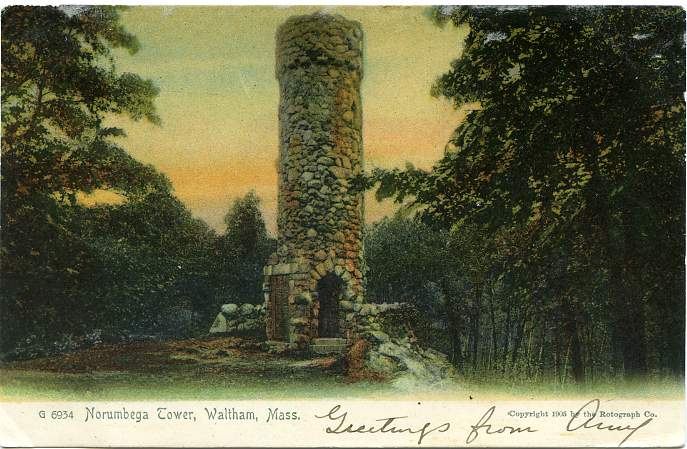
A postcard with art depicting the Norumbega Tower

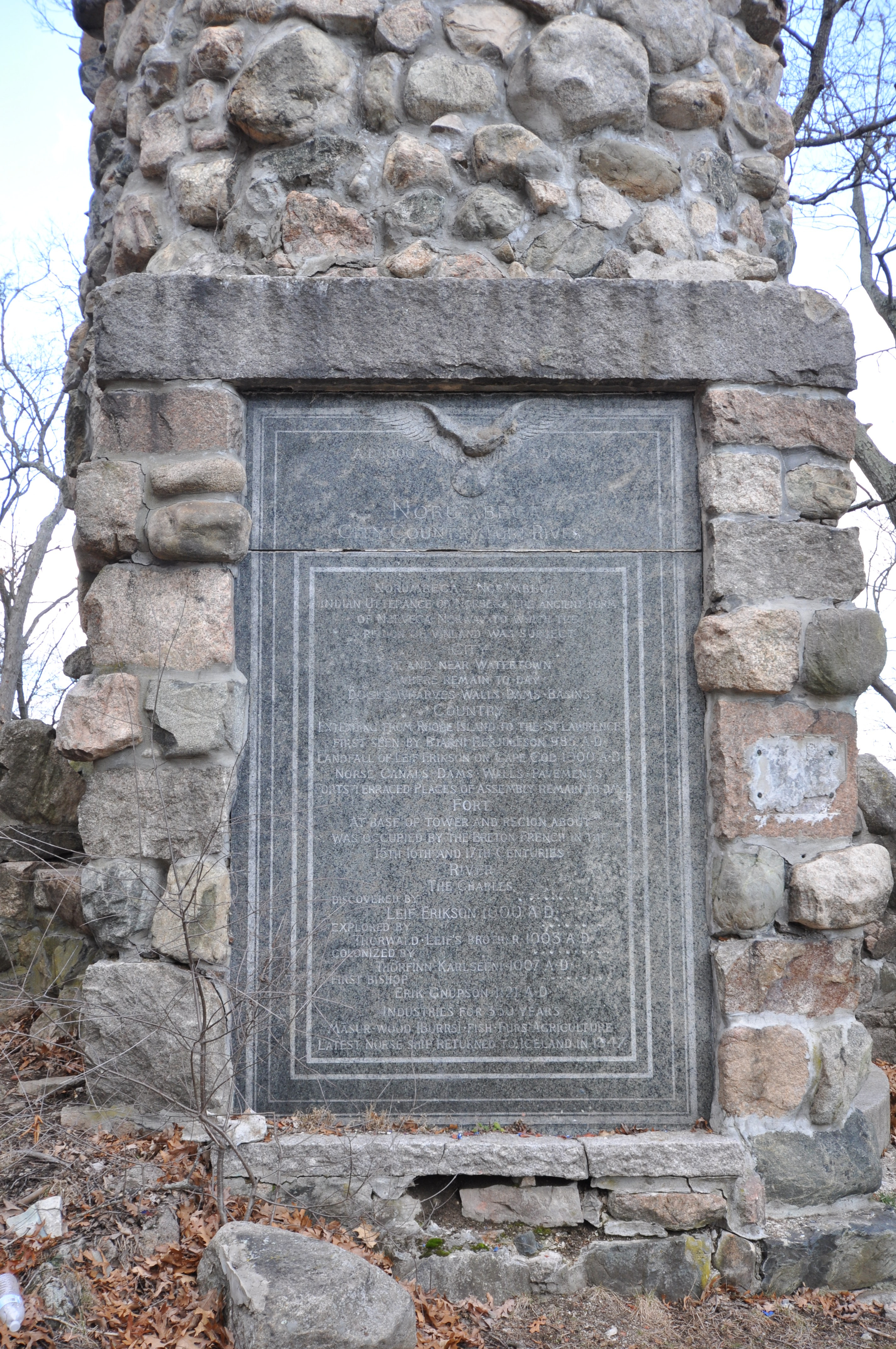
Closeup view of the plaque at the base of the tower. Transcription available here.

The Norumbega Tower is a stone tower erected by Eben Norton Horsford in 1889 to mark the supposed location of Fort Norumbega, a legendary Norse fort and city. It is located in Weston, Massachusetts at the confluence of Stony Brook and the Charles River. The tower is approximately 38 feet (12 m) tall, composed of mortared field stones with a spiral stone staircase. There is no evidence, archaeological or otherwise, to support the assertion that there were Norse settlements anywhere in New England.

Eben Norton Horsford was convinced that the Eastern Algonquian word 'Norumbega', which has been taken to mean the general region that is now coastal New England, was derived from 'Norvega', meaning Norway. A prominent stone plaque on the tower relates to Norse explorers from the Icelandic sagas. Horsford believed Norumbega to be Vinland, which he had no physical evidence to prove. The construction of the tower was accomplished four years before Horsford's death.

Horsford's beliefs and tower influenced the naming of Norumbega Park, a well-known recreational complex located across the river in Newton that operated from 1897 to 1964. The addition of the tower also altered the way Americans viewed Norse history and its impact on North America.
