= Norumbega =

Mythical country in North America

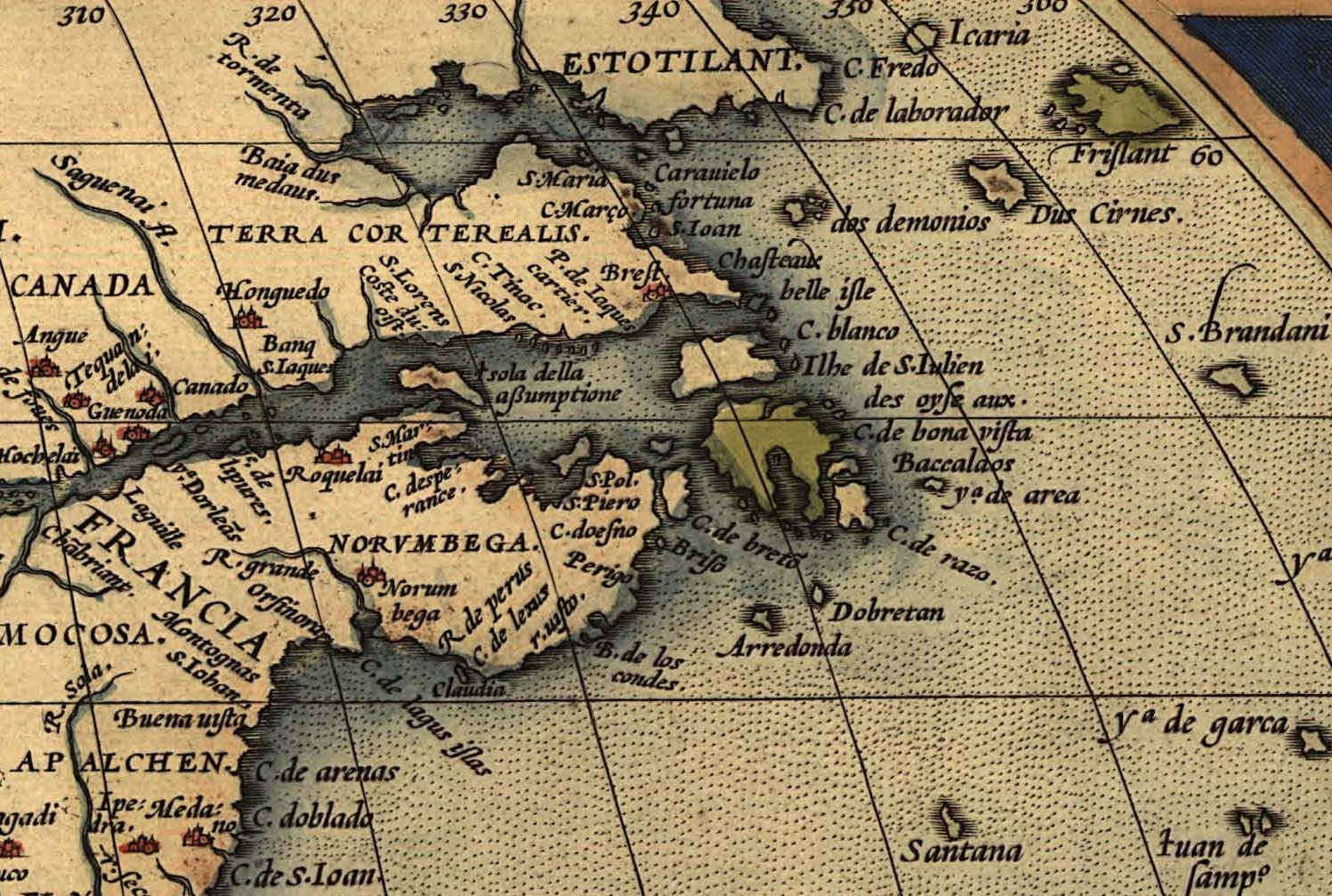
Part of Abraham Ortelius' atlas from 1570, showing "Norvmbega" among other somewhat mythical names for various areas as well as several phantom islands

Norumbega, or Nurembega, is a legendary settlement in northeastern North America which was featured on many early maps from the 16th century until further European colonization of the region. It was alleged that the houses had pillars of gold and the inhabitants carried quarts of pearls on their heads.

== Etymology and spelling ==
The word "Norumbega" was originally spelled Oranbega in Giovanni da Verrazzano's 1529 map of America, and the word is believed to derive from one of the Algonquian languages spoken in New England. It may mean "quiet place between the rapids" or "quiet stretch of water". In 1542, Jean Allefonsce reported that he had coasted south from Newfoundland and had discovered a great river. It often appeared on subsequent European maps of North America, lying south of Acadia in what is now New England. In 1598, Marquis de La Roche de Mesgouez was appointed lieutenant-general of Newfoundland, Labrador, and Norumbega. Norumbega was described as "an ambiguous location that includes what is now Maine and the Maritimes" in the 2020 book History of the Canadian Peoples: Beginnings to 1867.

Samuel de Champlain searched for Norumbega in 1604 and believed he had found Allefonsce's river in the form of the Penobscot, which he called "the great river of Norumbega". He sailed as far as the rapids at what is now Bangor, Maine, but finding only villages, his and subsequent maps deleted reference to Norumbega as a town, region, or even river. Most historians have subsequently accepted the Penobscot region as Allefonsce's source for Norumbega, though the matter was hotly contested by some nineteenth century antiquarians, who argued that the name should be identified with their own river or region.

The town of Bangor, Maine, commemorated the legend during the nineteenth century, naming their municipal hall "Norumbega Hall". In 1886, inventor Joseph Barker Stearns built a mansion named "Norumbega Castle", which still stands on US Route 1 in Camden, Maine, overlooking Penobscot Bay. During the late 19th century, Eben Norton Horsford associated the name and legend of Norumbega with supposed Norse settlements on the Charles River, and built the Norumbega Tower at the confluence of Stony Brook and the Charles River in Weston, Massachusetts, where he claimed Fort Norumbega was located. In honor of Horsford's generous donations to Wellesley College, a building named Norumbega Hall was dedicated in 1886 and celebrated in a poem by John Greenleaf Whittier. Presently, the myth is commemorated by such place names as Norumbega Mountain (formerly Brown Mountain) in Acadia National Park.
