= Hobbs Brook Basin Gate House =

- U.S. National Register of Historic Places
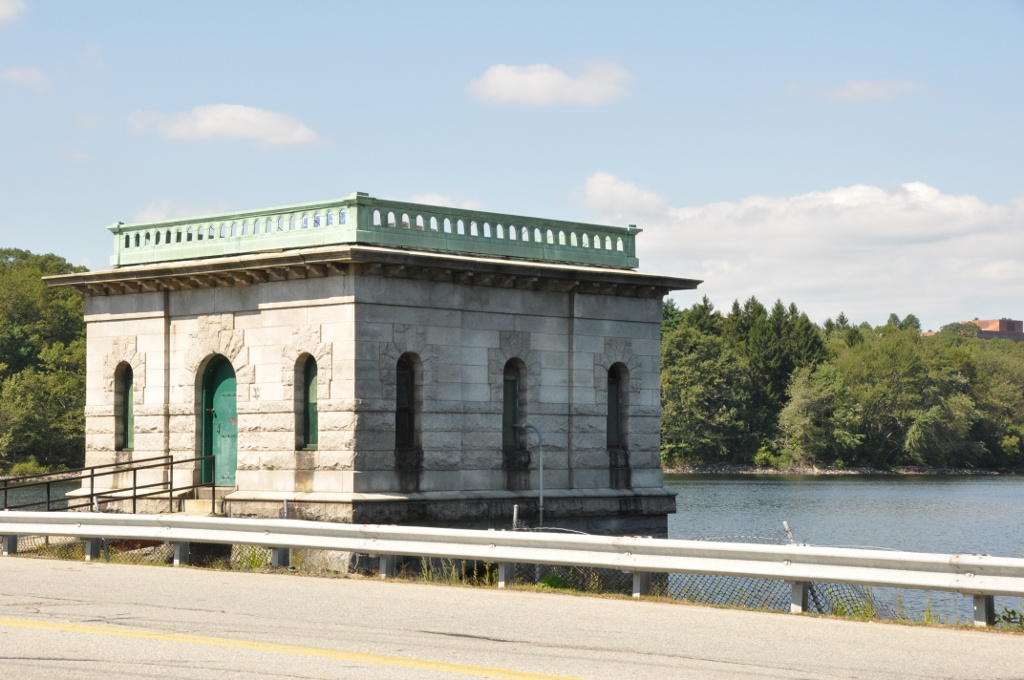

- Location within Massachusetts Location within the United States
- Location: Off Winter St. at mouth of Hobbs Brook, Waltham, Massachusetts
- Coordinates: 42°23′55″N 71°16′25″W
- Built: 1897
- Architect: Marshall N. Stearns
- MPS: Waltham MRA
- NRHP reference No.: 89001524
- Added to NRHP: September 28, 1989

The Hobbs Brook Basin Gate House is a historic waterworks gatehouse off Winter Street at the mouth of Hobbs Brook in Waltham, Massachusetts. The gatehouse forms part of the water supply system of Cambridge, Massachusetts, was built in 1894–95, and was placed in service in 1897. The building, designed by Marshall N. Stearns, is a single-story granite-faced structure standing on a granite platform that is accessed from Winter Street via a wooden bridge. It has narrow arched openings, and is topped by a flat roof with a bracketed cornice and copper balustrade.

The building was listed on the National Register of Historic Places in 1989.

== See also ==
- National Register of Historic Places listings in Waltham, Massachusetts
