= Stony Brook (Charles River tributary, Weston) =

Stream in Massachusetts, USA

Coordinates: 42°22′41.9″N 71°16′57.9″W

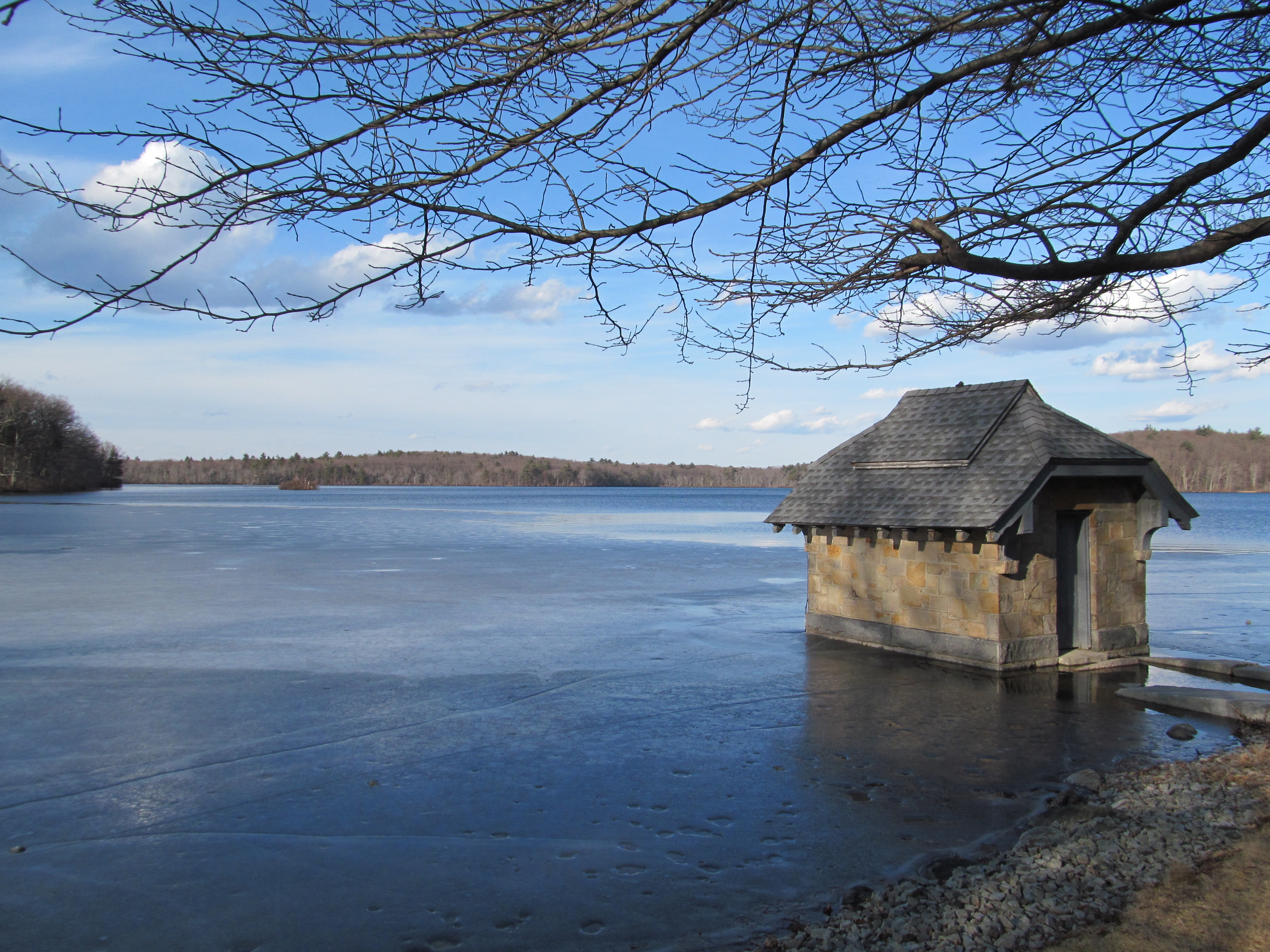
Sandy Pond (Flint's Pond)

Stony Brook is a stream largely running through Lincoln and Weston, Massachusetts, then forming the Weston/Waltham boundary, and emptying into the Charles River across from the Waltham/Newton boundary. It has two tributaries, Cherry Brook and Hobbs Brook, and its watershed includes about half of Lincoln and Weston as well as parts of Lexington and Waltham. Since 1887, it has been the water supply for Cambridge, along with the Hobbs Brook Reservoir.

== History ==
As early as 1662, water flowing into the Charles River helped spark business enterprise. Various water mills have been erected at the mouth of Stony Brook. A corn mill was built in January of 1679-80. A paper mill was built in about 1780 that was later purchased by the Boston Manufacturing Company in 1798 and converted into a cotton mill. In about 1802, another mill was built on Stony Brook to manufacture wrapping paper

In the late 19th century, Eben Norton Horsford identified the mouth of Stony Brook as the location of a supposed Norse city, Norumbega, and commissioned the Norumbega Tower, which carries a long inscription describing the supposed city.

There are three large ponds, all artificial, in the Stony Brook watershed: the Cambridge Reservoir (Hobbs Pond), the Stony Brook Reservoir (Turtle Pond), and Flint's Pond (also known as Sandy Pond).

In 1887, on the site of Turtle Pond, the city of Cambridge completed construction of the Stony Brook Reservoir Dam, where Stony Brook joins the Charles, as part of its water supply. Stony Brook Reservoir has a drainage area of 23.57 square miles (61.0 km^{2}) and an available storage capacity of 354,000,000 US gallons (1,340,000 m^{3}) (1087 acre-feet). In 1910, Hobbs Pond was dammed to become the Cambridge Reservoir. Its drainage area is 7.25 square miles (18.8 km^{2}) and its storage capacity is 2,338,000,000 US gallons (8,850,000 m^{3}) (7178 acre-feet). Flint's Pond (also known as Sandy Pond) was dammed to become the reservoir for the town of Lincoln; the DeCordova Museum is on its southeast bank.

== See also ==
- Hobbs Brook Basin Gate House
- Stony Brook (Merrimack River)
