= Cyril Horsford =

British surgeon

Cyril Horsford FRCS
- Born: Cyril Arthur Bennett Horsford; 25 January 1876; Saint George Basseterre, Saint Christopher
- Died: December 16, 1953 (aged 77); London, England
- Education: Bedford Modern School
- Alma mater: University of Edinburgh
- Occupations: Surgeon and Physician
- Known for: Laryngologist to the Royal College of Music, the Royal Choral Society and the Royal Society of Musicians

Cyril Arthur Bennett Horsford FRCS (25 January 1876 – 16 December 1953) was a British surgeon who was a leading authority on the anatomy and physiology of the throat. A passion for music led him to publish a work for singers, Why Voices Fail, after which he was much sought after by the leading singers of his day. He later became Laryngologist to the Royal Choral Society, the Royal College of Music and the Royal Society of Musicians.

== Life ==
Cyril Arthur Bennett Horsford was born in 1876, the son of the Hon. Samuel Horsford of St Kitts in the West Indies. He was educated at Bedford Modern School and the University of Edinburgh graduating with an MB ChB in 1898. He graduated with an MD in 1902, and was elected FRCS in the same year.

Horsford served as clinical assistant at the Throat Hospital in Golden Square and was registrar at the Central Throat and Ear Hospital (1905–13). He later set up private practice on Harley Street. In 1912 he wrote a medical paper entitled ‘Why voices fail’ following which he attracted many singers to his practice on Harley Street. Such was his success that he became laryngologist to the Royal College of Music, the Royal Choral Society and the Royal Society of Musicians. He regularly lectured on the medical aspects of voice production.

Horsford's later hospital appointments included the posts of honorary surgeon to the Princess Beatrice Hospital in Kensington and honorary surgeon in charge of the ear, nose and throat department of the St Pancras Dispensary.

Horsford married Edith Louise (née Sayers), the adopted daughter and ward of the late Miss Lascelles-Jones. He died on 16 December 1953 and was survived by his wife, a daughter and son.

== Selected papers ==
- Why Voices Fail
- An Original Method of Facilitating Intralaryngial Operations
- The Epiglottic Suture - Its value in Indirect Laryngoscopy
- Cancer of the Larynx
