= Orient windmills =

Windmills in New York

The Tide Mill at Southold, erected in the 1640s by Thomas Benedict, was the first mill on Long Island's east end at Southold. It's uncertain how long it lasted until the Reeve and Vail windmills.

== Mill four ==
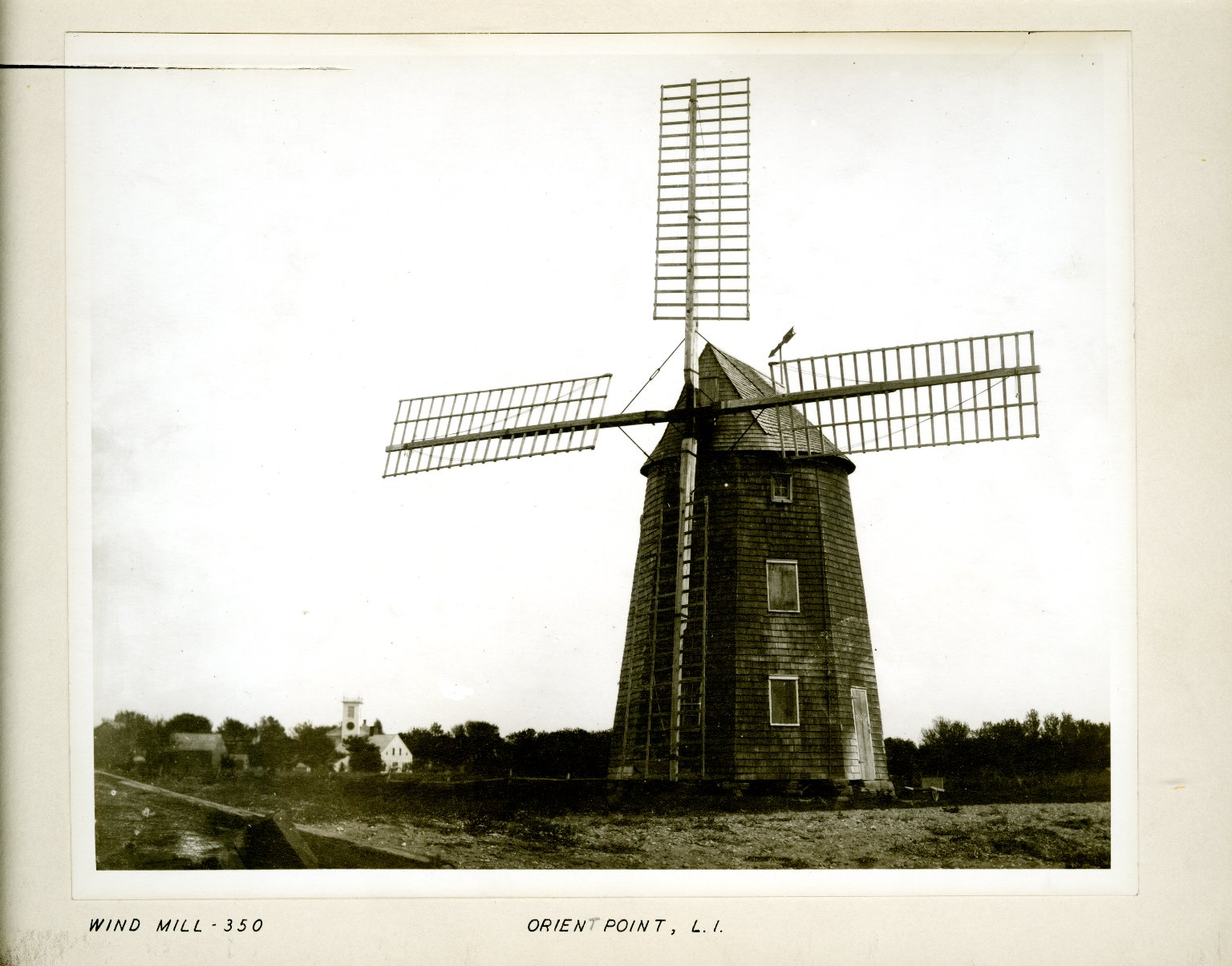
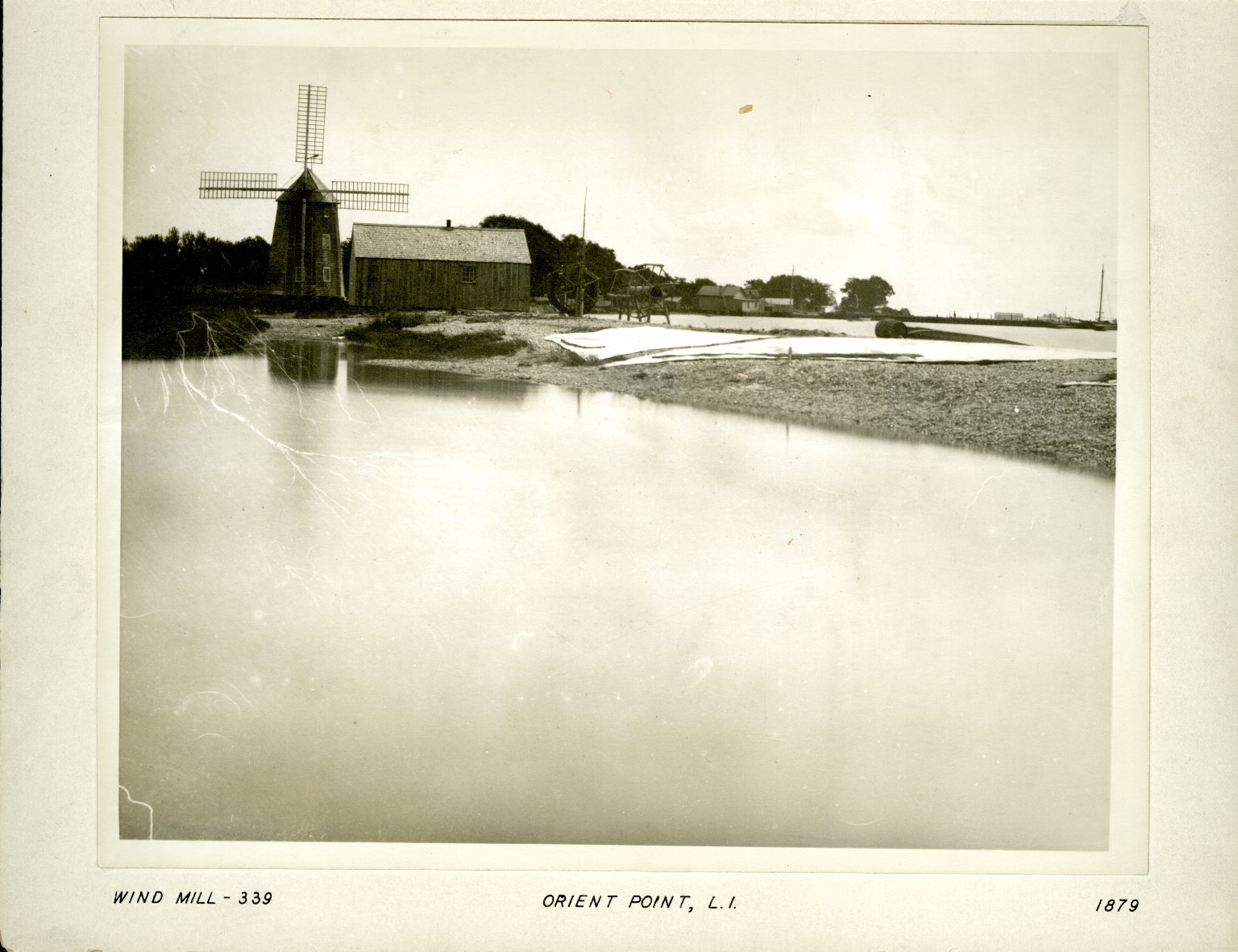
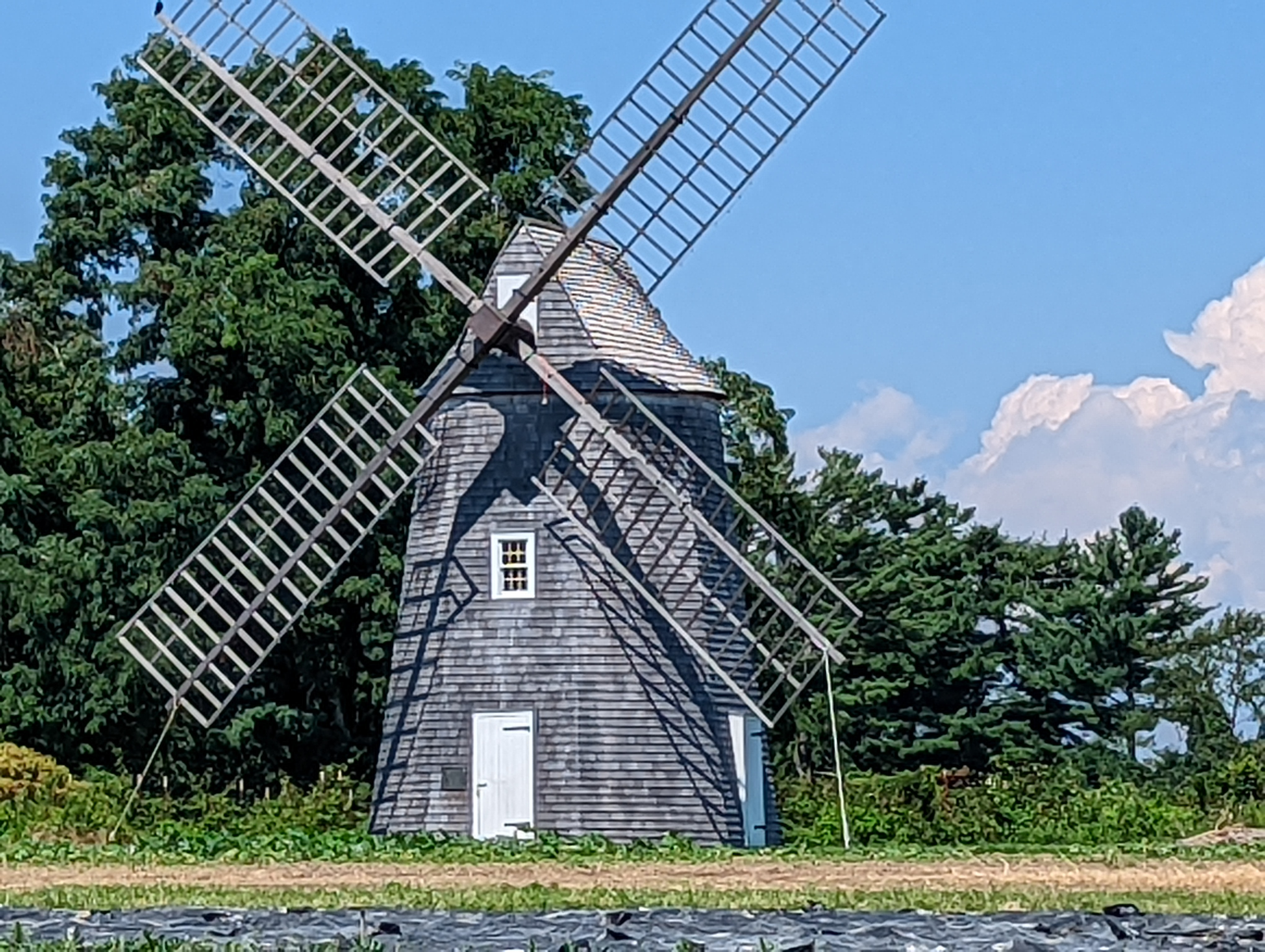
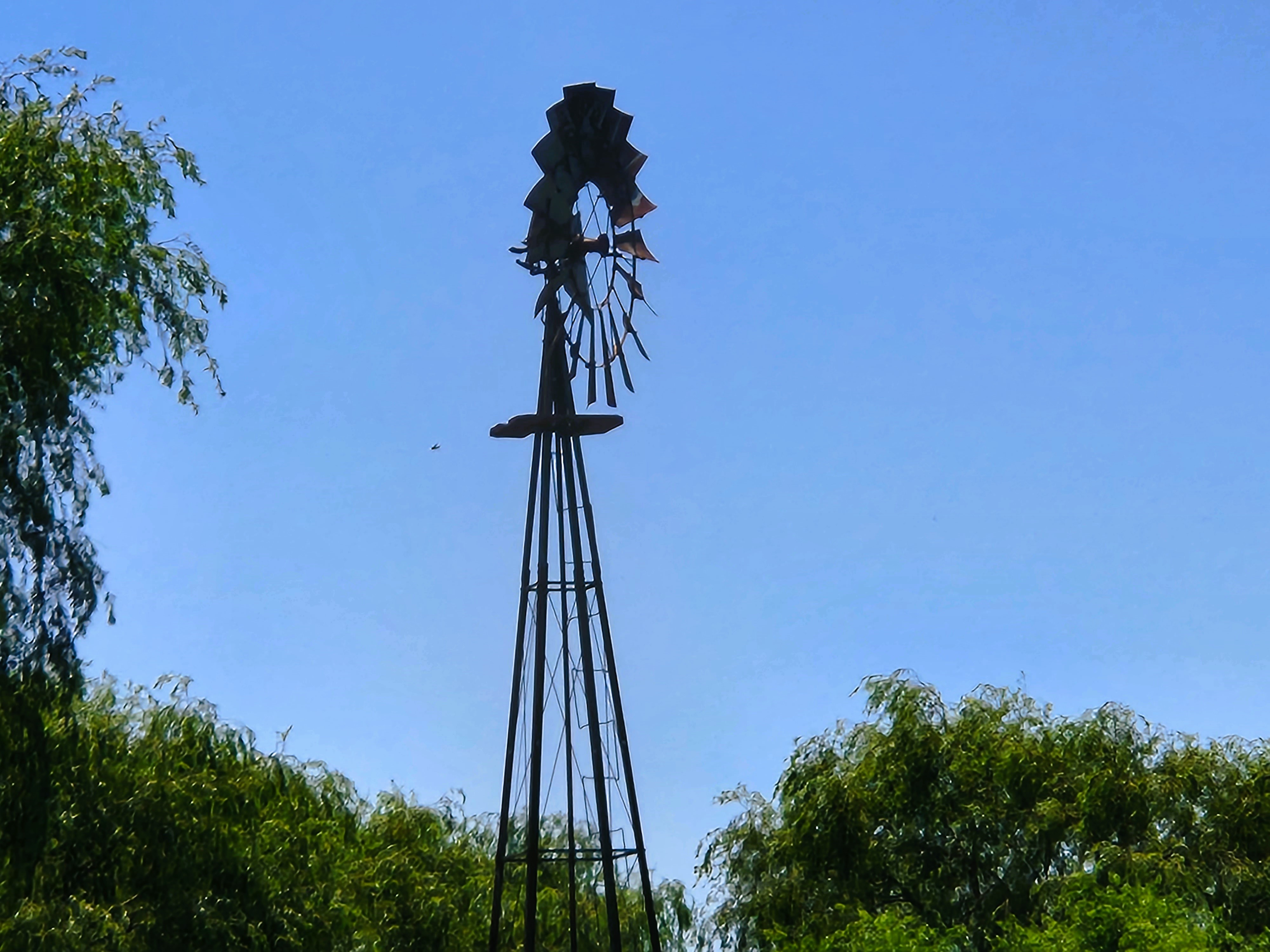
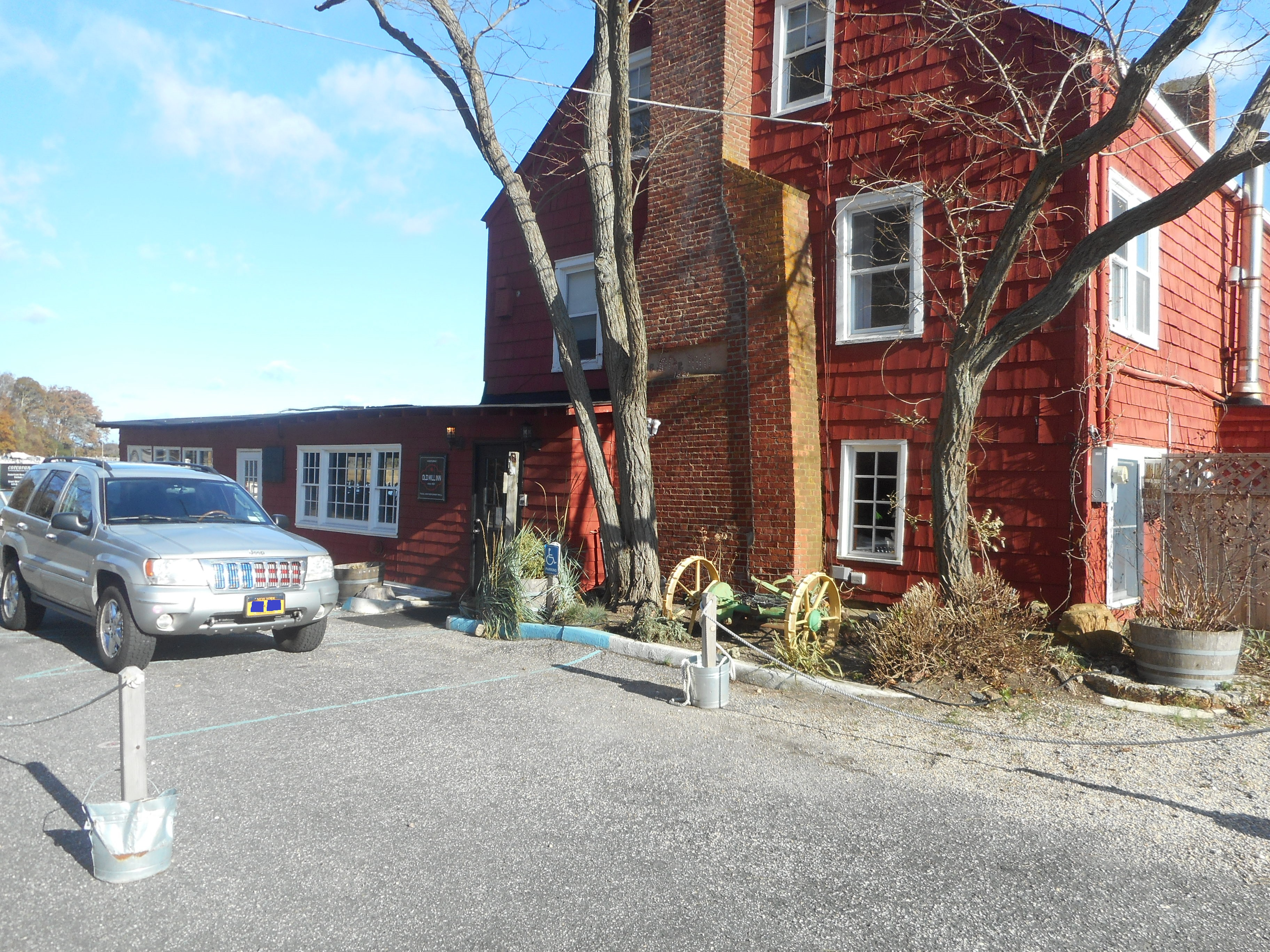
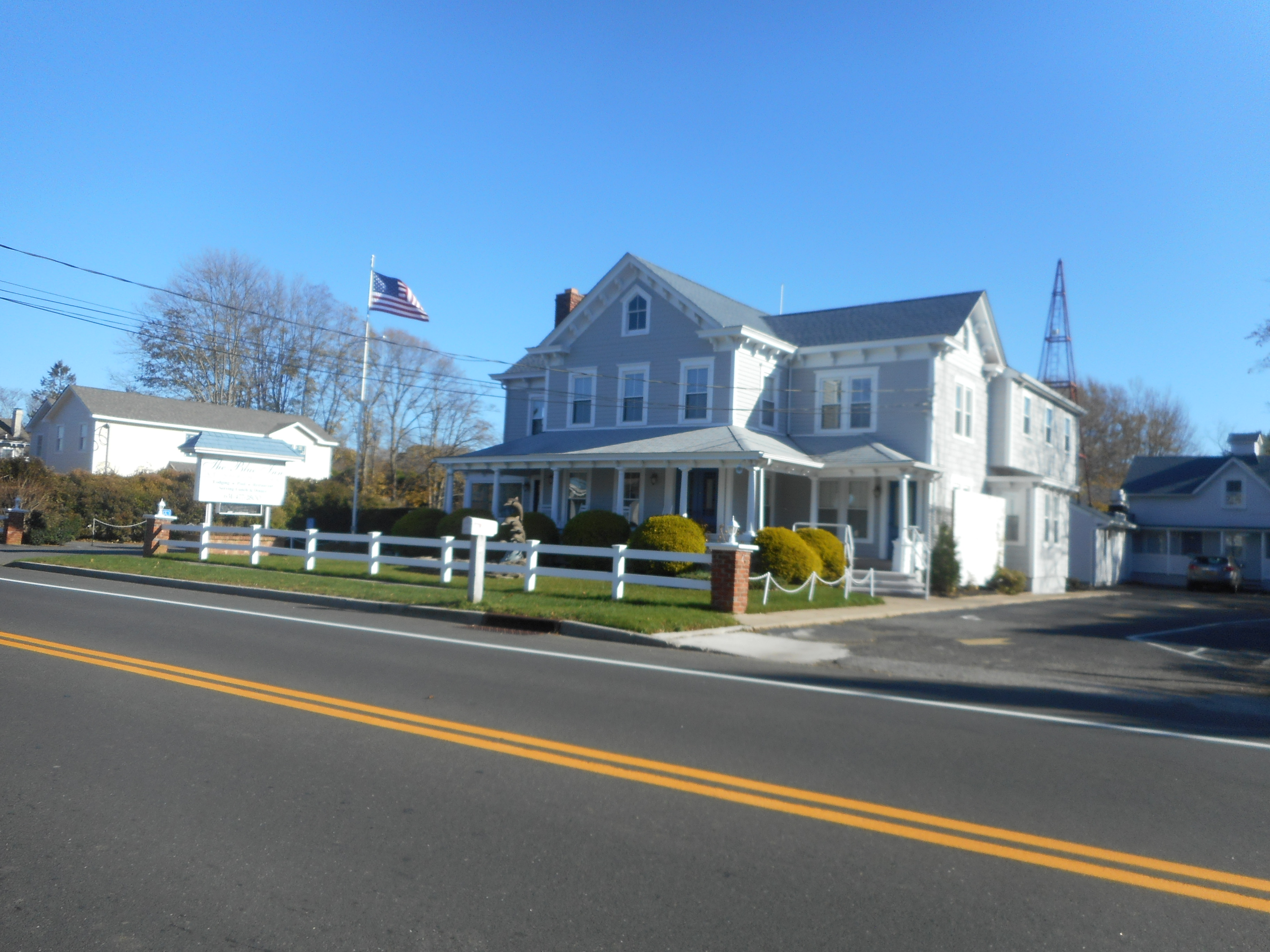
Long Island windmills. Top left: Windmill, Orient Point, 1887-1882. George Brainerd BPL collection. Top right: Millpond and Windmill, Orient Point. Middle left: Shelter Island windmill. Middle right: Windpump at Harbes farm, Jamesport, New York. Bottom left: Old Mill Inn, Mattituck, New York. Bottom right: Windpump at the Blue Inn, Marion New York.

Amon Taber built the fourth Orient windmill, located just west of the Orient Old Wharf on the waterfront, for Noah Tuthill in 1760. This mill was also used for grinding grain and replaced an earlier windmill.

== Mill five ==
Nathaniel Dominy V built an English style windmill on the Southold village green which was operated by the Terry Family.

== Mill VI ==
Dominy V also built the Shelter Island Windmill. It stands today at Sylvester's educational farm.

== Windpumps ==
The use of windmills and water powered gristmills to pump water has a long history on Long Island's North Fork, dating back to the early days of agriculture in the region. A Tuthill descendant recalls working on an American Style Windpump Windmill in 1904. Donald Tuthill estimated that the windpump was last used in the 50's. It was restored in 1985 to working order and the farm has been placed on the NRHP

The North Fork's flat terrain and consistent sea breezes made it an ideal location for windmills, and many were built in the 19th and early 20th centuries. They were typically made of wood, with canvas or wooden blades that could be adjusted to capture the wind. The windmill would turn a shaft that was connected to a pump, which would draw water from a well and distribute it to the fields through a system of pipes. The rise east of Greenport where the hamlet of East Marion lay in 1879 hosted a windmill visible from the bay.

== Other mills ==
A windmill was restored in Aquebogue that is a copy of the 1804 "Pantigo" smock mill.

The Tidal mill in Mattituck, NY was built in 1821. It was originally a grist mill, which was later converted into a tavern in 1902, and subsequently transformed into a seafood restaurant. The restaurant closed its doors in April 2017.

The Great Western Mill, situated on Pine Neck in Southold on the George W. Phillips lot east of Mill Hill (now known as Willow Hill), was a distinctive windmill with its iron sails and unique features. Although initially equipped with iron sails, an incident involving strong winds led to their replacement with more traditional canvas sails. Hampton Young and George W. Phillips played significant roles in running the mill, but ownership changed hands over time. In 1839, Hampton Young, Ira Corwin, George W. Phillips, and Giles Wells of Southold jointly purchased the mill. They made the remarkable decision to relocate the mill from New Jersey to Eastern Long Island. To accomplish this, the mill was disassembled into sections and transported through Long Island Sound to Southold Harbor.

Joshua Horton built a sawmill and a windmill at East Marion.

== Historic Marker ==
As many as 40 windmills and 27 tidal mills once dotted the length of Long Island.

A Historic Marker in Southold lists a good number of them. The Beers map of 1873 in the collection of the New York Public Library show at Mattituck and Peconic Village entries for G.M. (Grist Mill) at Mattituck inlet and Goldsmiths inlet, and a Sorghum Mill near Mattituck lake. On the Orient side the map shows in Orient Harbor, D.B. Horton, G.Mill.

== See also ==
- List of windmills in New York
