= Cornelia Horsford =

American archaeologist

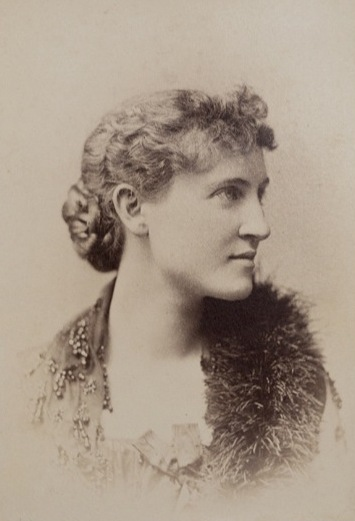

Academic work
- Discipline: Archaeology

Cornelia Conway Felton Horsford (1861–1944) was an American archaeologist and writer whose work focused on the Norse settlement of Vinland and other possible traces of early Norse exploration and settlement of North America, especially in Massachusetts. Her work was largely a development of earlier research carried out by her father, Eben Norton Horsford.

== Biography ==
Cornelia "Nellie" Conway Felton Horsford was born in Cambridge, Massachusetts, on September 25, 1861. Her father was the American chemist and amateur archaeologist Eben Norton Horsford, and her mother was his second wife, Phoebe Dayton Gardiner (the sister of his first wife, Mary L'Hommedieu Gardiner). Horsford's home was the historic Sylvester Manor, and she was educated at private schools in Cambridge and Boston.

Eben Horsford spent the fortune he had made by reformulating baking powder on attempting to prove that the Icelandic explorer Leif Erikson had settled somewhere along the Charles River. Before he died in 1893, he asked his daughter to carry on his work, and she continued excavations he had begun in an area of Cambridge known as Gerry's Landing, where she turned up the remains of a large house that she believed had belonged to Erikson's successor, Thorfinn Karlsefni. She gave her first presentation on this subject at a meeting of the American Association for the Advancement of Science (AAAS) in 1898, a year after she was made a Fellow of the society. She also spent time editing and publishing her father's writings, especially the short manuscript Leif's House in Vinland, which was issued in book form paired with Horsford's own essay "Graves of the North Men".

Horsford organized several overseas archaeological expeditions, including one to Iceland (1895) and several to Britain (1895, 1896, and 1897). Later in her career, she turned to looking for ruins of Norse settlements in North America similar to those already known in Iceland and Greenland. Her publications on the subject of Norse explorers in North America ranged from two books to articles in nonspecialist magazines such as Popular Science Monthly and National Geographic. Like other writers on the subject of Norse explorations in North America, she sometimes drew far-fetched conclusions from the scanty available evidence, concluding, for example, that the Huron and Iroquois peoples were descended in part from Norse settlers. Due to a continuing lack of substantive artefacts, the theory that the Norse explorers had settled along the Charles River went from controversial to unsustainable in Horsford's own lifetime, and serious scholars interested in the subject looked elsewhere in North America for such traces.

Horsford was a member of various antiquarian societies, such as the Icelandic Antiquarian Society and the Colonial Dames of Massachusetts. She was active in the AAAS for two decades and served on its General Committee in 1905–07.

Some of Horsford's correspondence is in the archives of the Rensselaer Polytechnic Institute Library and in the Franz Boas collection of the American Philosophical Society in Philadelphia. Other papers, including artworks, are held by Fales Library and Special Collections at New York University.

== Selected publications ==
=== Books ===
- Dwellings of the Saga Time in Iceland, Greenland, and Vineland (Washington, DC: Judd & Detweiler Printers, 1898)
- An Inscribed Stone (Cambridge, MA: J. Wilson & Son, 1895)

=== Articles ===
- "Graves of the North Men" (1893)
- "Vinland and its Ruins: Some of the Evidence that Northmen were in Massachusetts in Pre-Columbian Days" (1899)
