= Mary Gardiner Horsford =

American poet

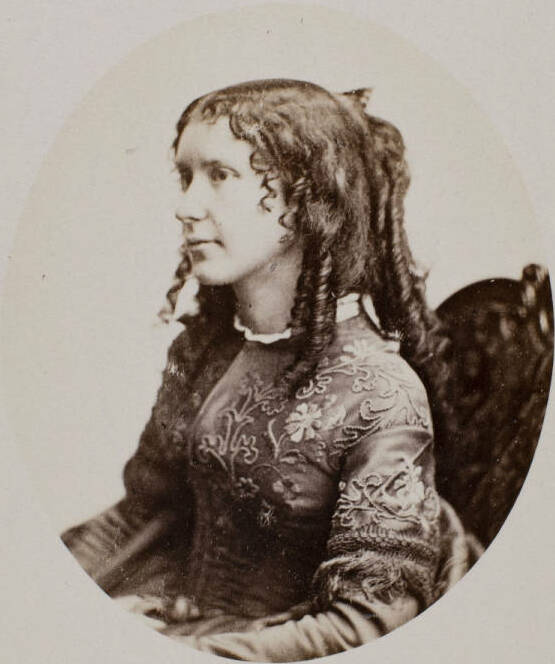
- Born: Mary L'Hommedieu Gardiner; September 27, 1824; New York City, New York, United States
- Died: November 25, 1855 (aged 31)
- Spouse: Eben Norton Horsford (m. 1847)

Mary Gardiner Horsford (born Mary L'Hommedieu Gardiner; September 27, 1824 – November 25, 1855) was an American poet and the wife of chemist Eben Norton Horsford.

Mary L'Hommedieu Gardiner was born in New York City, the daughter of Samuel Smith Gardiner and Catherine L'Hommedieu. She was a descendant of Lion Gardiner and a cousin to Julia Gardiner Tyler.

In 1840, she began a three-year course of education at Albany Female Academy. It was there that she met her future husband, Eben Norton Horsford, who was then a teacher. Her father, cautious of the young teacher's financial prospects, denied permission for the marriage until Horsford had attained the Rumford Chair of Physics, and the couple were married on August 4, 1847. They lived at Sylvester Manor, which had descended through her mother's family.

Her career as a poet began in her youth and continued during her marriage. She wrote for The Knickerbocker, Godey's Lady's Book, and other periodicals. Her poem "My Native Isle," commemorating her longtime home of Shelter Island, New York, was among those anthologized in Henry Wadsworth Longfellow's collection Poems of Places. In 1855, she published the collection Indian Legends and Other Poems. The book received favorable reviews. Godey's Lady's Book promoted the collection as a "volume of pearls from the heart-fountain of one of our sweetest American poetesses." The North American Review praised the "grace and style and flowing versification" of the poems, as well as the "earnestness of tone and the purity of Christian sentiment which are their leading characteristics." The poems have retroactively attracted criticism for repeating "familiar stereotypes, both horrific and romantic" in their tacit approval of manifest destiny.

Mary Gardiner and Eben Horsford had four daughters: Lilian, Mary Katherine, Gertrude Hubbard (married Andrew Fiske), and Mary Gardiner (married Supreme Court justice Benjamin Robbins Curtis). In the autumn of 1855, months after the birth of her youngest daughter, Mary Gardiner Horsford developed a cold which soon became tetanus or lockjaw. She died on November 25, 1855. The North American Review opined that her sudden death lent her poetry "a new and melancholy significance." The Boston Transcript eulogized her, saying that "her poems have been much admired for their easy and correct versification and for their simple but beautiful imagery."

In 1857 Mary's widower, Eben Norton Horsford, married Mary's sister, Phoebe Dayton Gardiner, and with her had one daughter, Cornelia Horsford.
