= Namskaket =

Former village in Massachusetts

Coordinates: 41°47′30.39″N 70°00′58.06″W

Namskaket (also Naamskeket, Naemschatet, Namskeket, Naumskachett) was a Nauset village on or near Namskaket Creek in Barnstable County, Massachusetts, near the modern border between Brewster and Orleans.

Native Americans sold the site to English colonists in 1644.

It is now a village in Orleans.
