= Walter Horsford =

English farmer executed for murder

- Born: April 1871; United Kingdom
- Died: 28 June 1898 (aged 27); Cambridge Prison, England, United Kingdom
- Cause of death: Execution by hanging
- Occupation: Farmer
- Conviction: Murder
- Penalty: Death

Walter Horsford (April 1871 – 28 June 1898) was a murderer executed in June 1898 for poisoning his cousin Annie Holmes with strychnine. He was the first person to be executed in Cambridge, England, following the end of public executions, and a dedicated building was constructed for his hanging. His conviction was notable for relying solely on circumstantial evidence. He was suspected of three other murders using the same method.

== Murder of Annie Holmes ==
In 1897 Horsford, aged 26, was a well-off farmer living in Spaldwick. He was in an intimate relationship with his cousin, Annie Holmes, a widow with three children. In October of that year, Horsford married another cousin of his, Bessie Mash. Shortly after this marriage, Holmes left Spaldwick and lodged in an inn in St Neots. In December she wrote to Horsford claiming she was pregnant.

On 7 January 1898 Holmes received a postal packet from Horsford, and went to bed. An hour later her daughter heard Holmes screaming and found her in agony. Holmes died within a few minutes of a doctor arriving. At an inquest the following day Horsford stated he had not written to Holmes nor seen her since she left. When medical evidence pointed to strychnine poisoning, the police searched her bedroom and found two packets. One contained 30 grains of strychnine with the words "one dose, take as told" and the other was empty with "take in a little water, it is quite harmless" written on it. On 10 January Horsford was arrested for perjury at the inquest, and later that day further arrested for murder.

The trial took place on 2 June 1898. At the trial it was stated that the impression of handwriting on the packages could be traced on a blotter on a desk in Horsford's home. Horsford had also purchased strychnine from a local chemist on 28 December 1897, claiming he was overrun with rats, and signed the register with his name.

The jury did not retire but returned a guilty verdict immediately after the judge's summing up. Horsford was sentenced to death and executed on 28 June in Cambridge prison.

== Other murders ==
Horsford was suspected of three other murders. The first was his former fiancée Fanny James who died in 1890 after claiming she had become pregnant, and after receiving a letter from Horsford. According to her family her symptoms were consistent with strychnine poisoning. However the inquest at the time recorded a verdict of death through eating a hearty meal. The second was a "girl from Peterborough" with whom he had been intimate, and who died after receiving a letter from him. The third case involved a man with the surname James who was a relative of Fanny James. Horsford supplied the usual beer to a group of men after working a day threshing wheat. He took James aside and gave him an extra quart, and he died in agony later that night. The inquest verdict recorded death from sunstroke, apparently without seeing the body.

== See also ==
- List of serial killers by country
