= Eben Norton Horsford =

American chemistry professor (1818–1893)

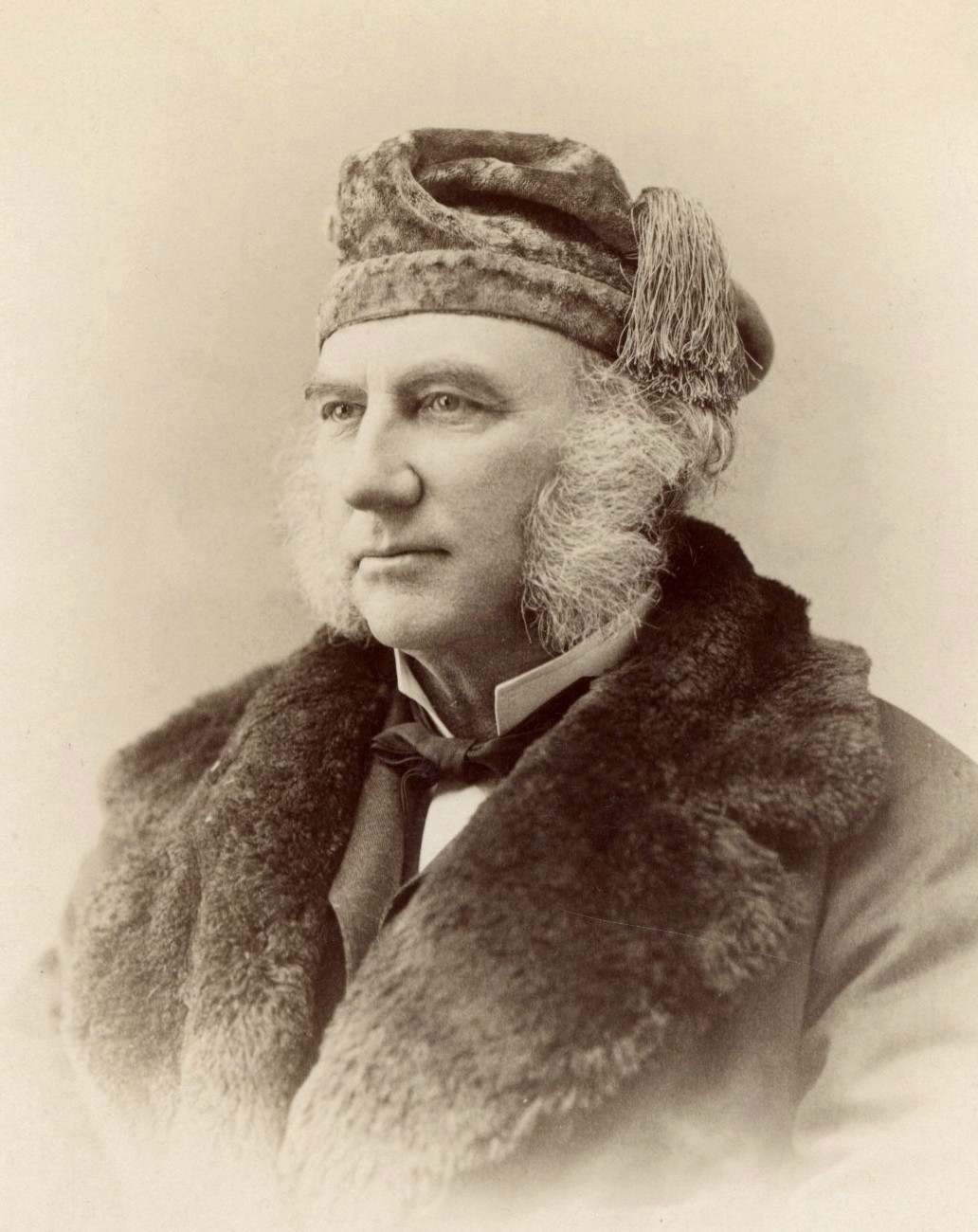
- Horsford c. 1860
- Born: July 27, 1818; Moscow, New York, United States
- Died: January 1, 1893 (aged 74)
- Known for: Glycocoll; Baking powder Viking research
- Spouses: Mary L'Hommedieu Gardiner (m. 1847; died 1855) Phoebe Dayton Gardiner (m. 1857)
- Children: Cornelia Horsford; Lilian Horsford
- Scientific career
- Fields: Chemistry
- Workplaces: Albany Female Academy; Lawrence Scientific School

Eben Norton Horsford (July 27, 1818 – January 1, 1893) was an American scientist who taught agricultural chemistry in the Lawrence Scientific School at Harvard from 1847 to 1863. Later he was known for his reformulation of baking powder, his interest in Viking settlements in North America, and the monuments he built to Leif Erikson.

== Life and career ==
Horsford was born in Moscow, New York, located in the Genesee River valley, to Jerediah Horsford and Maria Charity Norton. "At home he showed a certain inventive or mechanical skill, great ability in sketching, and unbounded interest in collecting specimens from the rich fossil deposits on the family farm." In 1837 Eben met James Hall working on the New York State Natural History Survey. Eben was of such service that Hall wrote Amos Eaton, effectively recommending him for scholarship. He instructed in perspective drawing at the school in Troy, New York, county seat of Rensselaer County.

In 1838 Horsford was awarded Bachelor of Natural Science in Engineering from Rensselaer School and took up teaching mathematics and natural history at Albany Female Academy. At some point he met Mary L'Hommedieu Gardiner of Shelter Island, New York, a student, and she became the object of his affection, but her father disapproved of the relationship on the grounds that Horsford's income was insufficient to support a family.

Seeking advancement, Horsford twice, for six weeks, taught chemistry at Newark College (Newark, Delaware). In 1842 he attended an event of the American Association of Geologists and Naturalists, and thereafter took up a study of Justus von Liebig's Organic Chemistry. Soon he was advocating Liebig's views on agricultural chemistry. He decided to study with Liebig at the University of Giessen in Germany, and departed October 10, 1844. After he qualified to work in Liebig's lab in October 1845, he took up the analysis of nitrogen content of grains, an index of their nutritive value as fodder. In February of the following year he began quantitative elemental analysis of "sugar of gelatin", then called glycocoll. Previous attempts at this analysis by Mulder and Bossingault had yielded unwieldy giants; Horsford's result was $\ce{C4H5NO3 ,}$ not exactly right.

Henry Darwin Rogers had been the leading candidate for the Rumford Chair of Physics until John White Webster got involved. Rogers had been tarnished by association with Vestiges of Creation, and as recommended by Webster, Horsford in Germany visited laboratories and industrial plants before returning from Liebig's lab. Since Rogers and George B. Emerson had charged Webster with incompetence, and challenged his Harvard position, Webster was keen that Horsford take the Rumford Chair rather than Rogers. On January 30, 1847, Horsford was elected unanimously by Harvard Corporation.

With his new position, Horsford obtained permission from Mary's father and they were wed on August 4, 1847. Two years after Mary's death in 1855, Horsford married Phoebe Dayton Gardiner (August 15, 1826 – October 8, 1900), Mary's sister. Horsford had four daughters by Mary and one daughter, Cornelia Horsford, by Phoebe.

The new university president was Edward Everett, and Abbott Lawrence had come forward to finance a new scientific school at Harvard. But the funds for Horsford’s lab were consumed by heating costs and salaries for a janitor and assistants. In April 1854 Horsford realized that the demands put upon him were unreasonably onerous and he wrote the Corporation: "The necessity of the elementary instruction made it my fortune to be oppressed pecuniarily and professionally. In attempting to do what seemed to be required, I was compelled almost to lose sight of the objects which as a scientific man I had placed before myself."

Horsford taught chemistry and conducted research at the Lawrence Scientific School at Harvard for 16 years. For textbooks, the same ones that were used in Germany were also followed at Harvard (and Yale): Heinrich Will's Outlines of the course of Qualitative Analysis followed in the Giessen Laboratory (1847), and Remigius Fresenius's Instruction in Chemical Analysis (quantitative) (1846). His publication included such topics as phosphates, condensed milk, fermentation, and emergency rations.

In 1849, he was elected as a member to the American Philosophical Society.

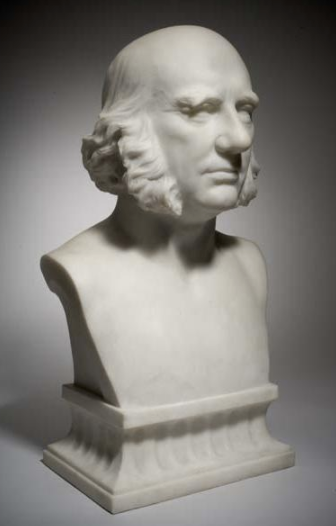
Anne Whitney, Eben Norton Horsford, 1890, Davis Museum, Wellesley College

A generous supporter of higher education for women, Horsford became president of the board of visitors of Wellesley College, and donated money for books, scientific apparatus, and a pension fund to the college. He enjoyed remarkable success through his development of processes for manufacturing baking powder and condensed milk. In seeking patents for his inventions, Horsford was assisted by Charles Grafton Page, a patent solicitor who had previously worked at the US Patent Office.

Professor Eben Norton Horsford created the Shelter Island Public Library in Shelter Island, New York in 1885. He donated 280 volumes for the first library, which was initially housed in a closet in the Old Store, a building that functioned as a post office, telegraph station, and local meeting place. After the store burned down in 1891, a new library for more books donated by Professor Horsford was built on a nearby lot donated by his daughter Lilian, and his daughter Cornelia became the library's first president.

=== Baking powder ===
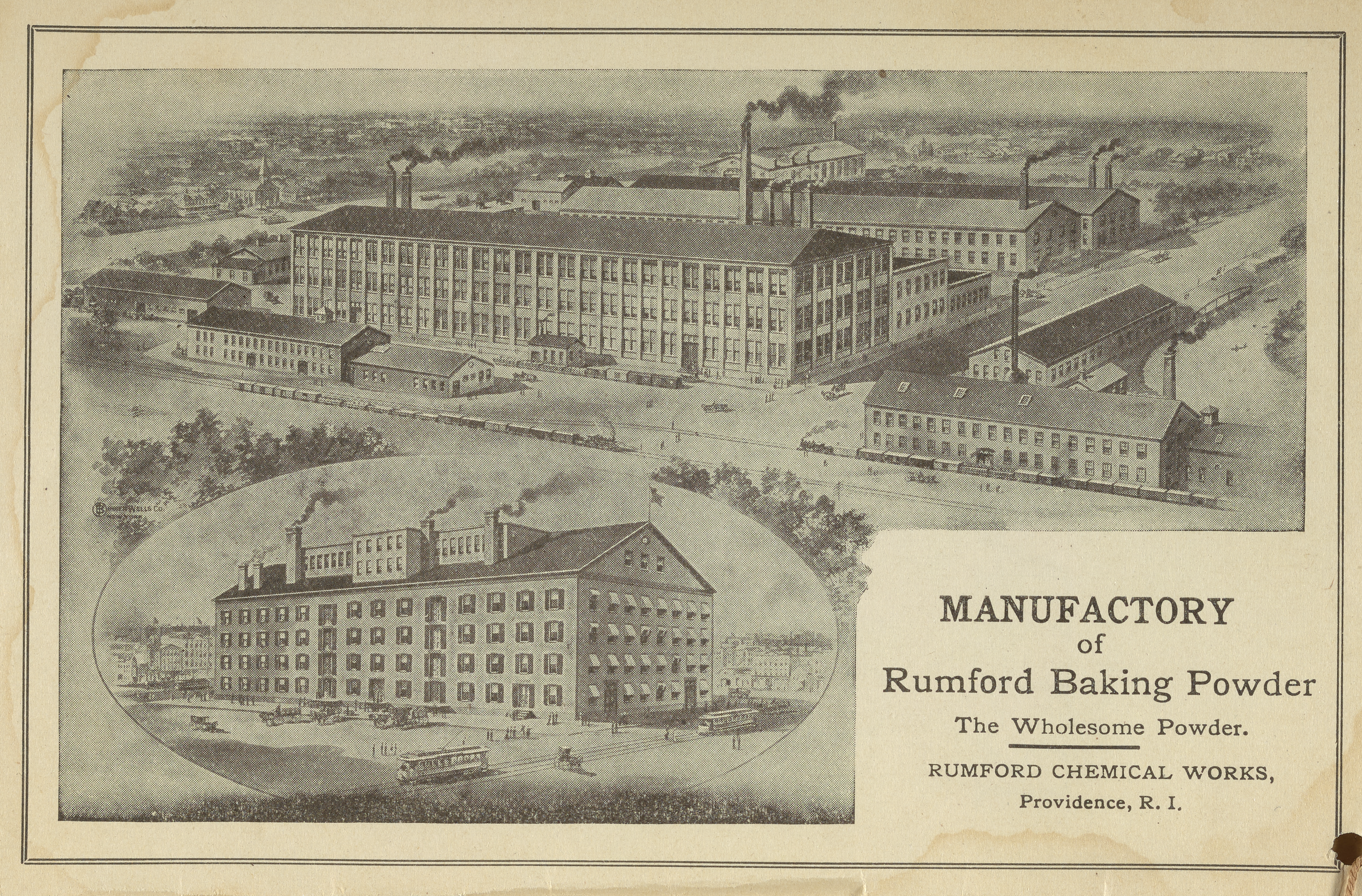
Manufactory of Rumford baking powder, ca.1910

Baking powder had contained baking soda and cream of tartar. Horsford replaced the cream of tartar with the more reliable calcium biphosphate (also known as calcium acid phosphate and many other names). He did this a little earlier than August Oetker. In 1854, Horsford, with partner George Wilson, formed the Rumford Chemical Works. They named it after the title of Horsford's position at Harvard.

Horsford obtained patents for the production of calcium biphosphate as well as other chemicals. The creation of a commercially successful baking powder was the basis of his wealth, enabling him to pursue personal and philanthropic interests in later life. Horsford's development of baking powder was designated a National Historic Chemical Landmark in 2006.

The Horsford Cookbook, 1877

The Horsford 1887 almanac and cook book, 1887

The Rumford Cook Book, 1910

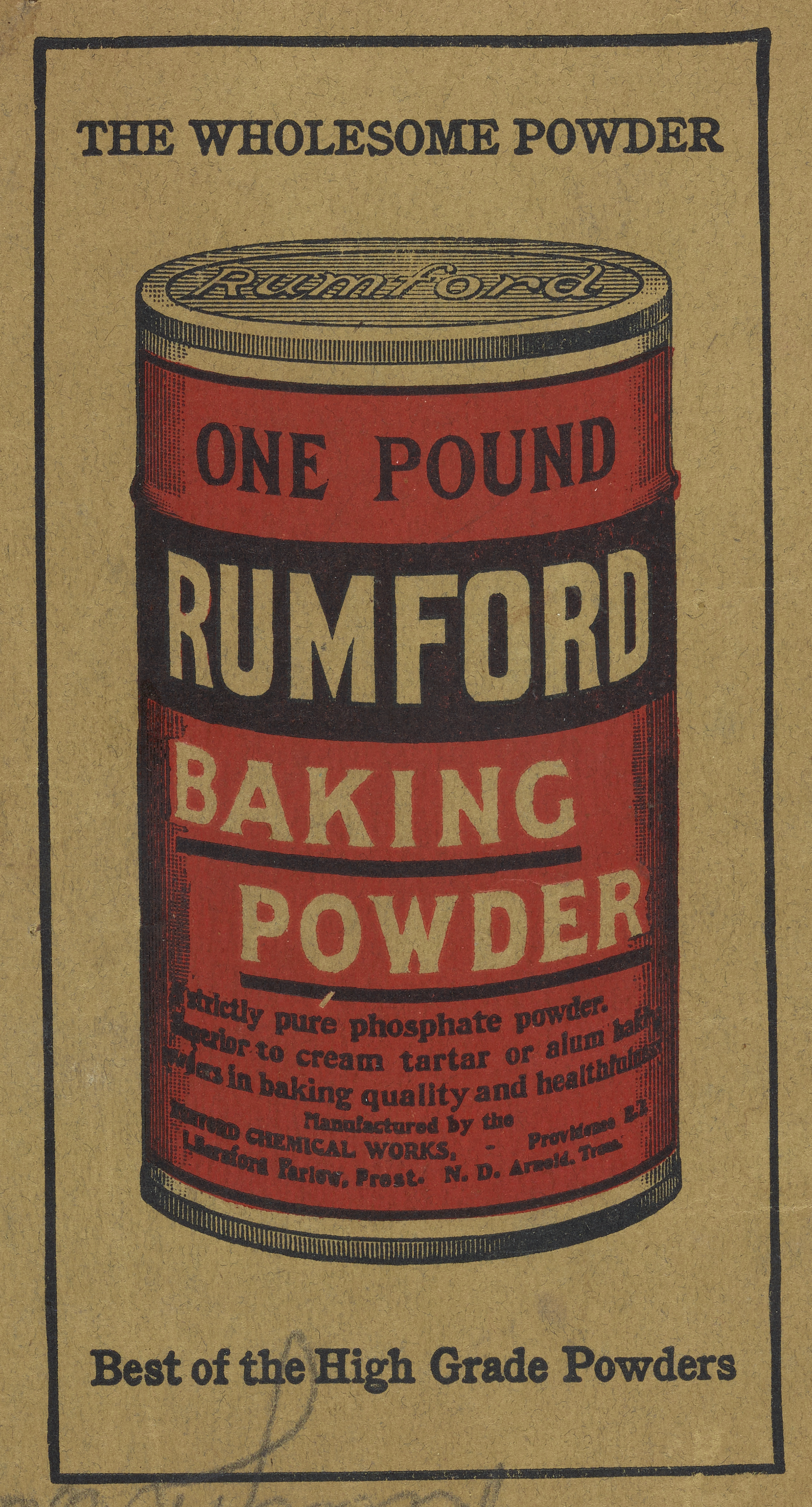
The Rumford Cook Book, 1910, back cover

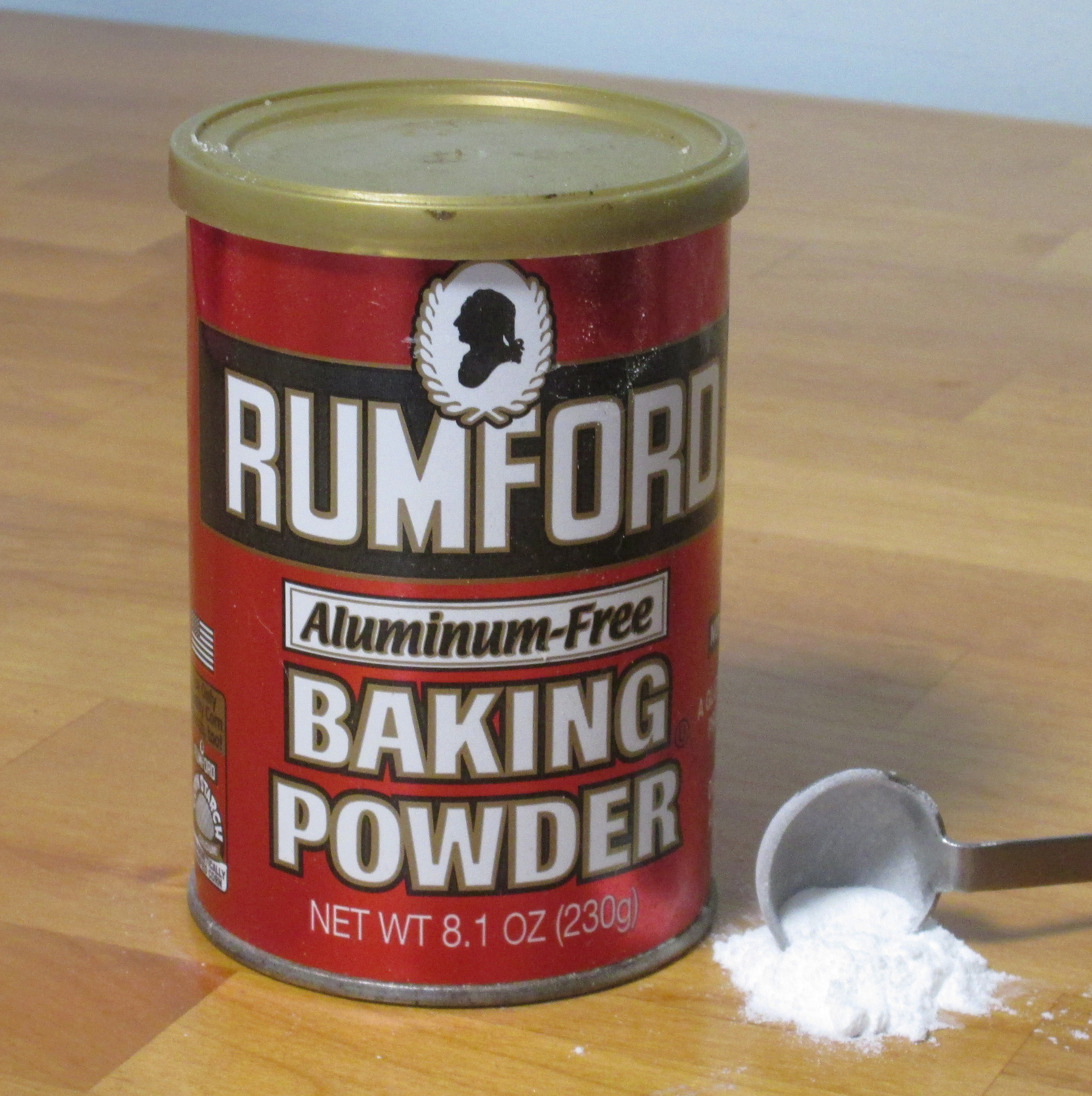
Rumford Baking Powder

=== Vikings ===
Horsford became interested in the theory that the Vikings, specifically Leif Ericson, had visited North America, and set out to prove it. He connected the Charles River Basin to places described in the Norse sagas, invented Old Norse etymologies for Algonquian place-names like Naumkeag, Namskaket, and Amoskeag, and claimed to have found Viking archaeological remains. Robin Fleming wrote that these included an assertion that he found "an elaborately engineered system of Viking waterways throughout Boston, constructed to support the industrial efforts of the Norse settled in New England, who produced, for three centuries, thousands of tons of wooden drinking cups." Horsford had a plaque documenting all this placed on Memorial Drive near Mount Auburn Street in Cambridge, Massachusetts. A few miles upstream, at the mouth of Stony Brook, he had Norumbega Tower built marking the supposed location of Norumbega, a Viking fort and city, complete with its Althing and America's first Christian bishop. He also commissioned a statue of Leif Ericson that stands on Commonwealth Avenue in Boston. The professor wrote a series of books, articles, and pamphlets about the Vikings' visits to Massachusetts. After his death, his daughter Cornelia Horsford took up the cause. Their work received little support from mainstream historians and archeologists at the time, and even less today.

In honor of Horsford's generous donations to Wellesley College, a building named Norumbega Hall was dedicated in 1886 and celebrated by a poem by John Greenleaf Whittier.

== Selected works ==
- 1846: Analyses of Grains and Vegetables (Distinguishing the nitrogenous from the non-nitrogenous ingredients, for the purpose of estimating their separate values for nutrition.) Includes On Ammonia found in Glaciers and Action and Ingredients of Manures.
- 1847: Glycocoll (gelatine sugar) and some of its products of decomposition, The American Journal of Science and Arts Series 2, 3:369–381 via HathiTrust
- 1848: (editor) Liebig's Researches on the Chemistry of Food and the Motion of the Juices in the Animal Body, Lowell Massachusetts
- 1850: Connection between the atomic weights and the physical and chemical properties of barium, strontium, calcium and magnesium, and some of their compounds, American Journal of Science and Arts, series 2, volume 9, New Haven
- 1850: Relation of the chemical constitution of bodies to taste
- 1852: A Discussion of the Explosion of Burning Fluid which Took Place at Salem
- 1860: Chemistry: Theoretical, Practical and Analytical, as applied and relating to arts and manufacture
- 1860: Chemistry volume 2: Fuel to Zinc
- 1860: Problems in Physics, from Ausgaben auf der Physik by Fliedner
- 1864: The Army Ration
- 1869: The Theory and Art of Bread-making: A New Process Without the Use of Ferment
- 1875: Report on Vienna Bread
- 1887: (editor) Zeisberger's Indian Dictionary : English, German, Iroquois, Algonquin, Cambridge Massachusetts
- 1889: The Problem of the Northmen, John Wilson and Son.
- 1890: The Discovery of the Ancient City of Norumbega, Houghton, Mifflin.
- 1890: The Problem of the Northmen, Houghton, Mifflin.
- 1891: The Defenses of Norumbega, Houghton, Mifflin.
- 1892: The Landfall of Leif Erikson, A.D. 1000, and the Site of his Houses in Vineland, Damrell and Upham.
