= List of libraries owned by Sony =

Content libraries and catalogs

This is a list of content libraries and catalogs owned by Sony.

== Content libraries ==
=== Sony Pictures Entertainment ===
- Delphi Productions library
- Rastar library (excluding films owned by third-party companies)
  - Rastar Features library
  - Rastar Films library
  - Rastar Pictures library
- Madison Gate Records discography
- Home entertainment and television rights to the FilmDistrict film library (under license from Content Partners LLC)
- Sony Pictures Entertainment Japan
- Sony Pictures Motion Picture Group
  - Columbia Pictures film library (excluding films owned by third-party companies or owned in the public domain)
    - Ghost Corps film library
    - Weintraub Entertainment Group library
  - 3000 Pictures film library
  - Matt Tolmach Productions film library (excluding Dark Harvest, owned by Metro-Goldwyn-Mayer)
  - Screen Gems film library
    - Screen Gems cartoon library (excluding cartoons in the public domain)
    - Screen Gems television library (excluding the pre-1969 Hanna-Barbera library, owned by Skydance Corporation via Warner Bros.)
  - Sony Pictures Animation library (excluding KPop Demon Hunters and Fixed, owned by Netflix)
  - UPA library
  - Sony Pictures Classics library (excluding the 1990s Castle Rock Entertainment films, owned by Skydance Corporation via Warner Bros.)
  - Sony Pictures Home Entertainment
    - Sony Pictures Kids Zone library (excluding programs produced by Sunbow Entertainment and the rest of Sony Wonder, owned by Studio 100)
    - Kartoon Studios (7% stake)
      - Genius Brands Music discography
      - Kartoon Channel programming library
      - Baby Genius library
      - Stan Lee Universe library
      - A Squared Entertainment LLC library
      - Stan Lee Comics LLC library (60%)
      - Wow Unlimited Media library
        - Mainframe Studios library
        - Frederator Networks
          - Frederator Studios library
            - Frederator Films
          - Channel Frederator Network programming library
            - StashRiot library
            - Cartoon Hangover library
            - Frederator Flux
              - The Leaderboard Network programming library
              - Cinematica programming library
              - MicDrop programming library
              - Atomo Network programming library (joint venture with Ánima)
          - Frederator Books library
          - Thirty Labs library
        - Ezrin Hirsh Entertainment library
    - Big Picture Productions library
  - Sony Pictures Worldwide Acquisitions
    - Destination Films library
    - Stage 6 Films library
    - Triumph Films library (excluding the Epic Productions and Vision PDG libraries, owned by Metro-Goldwyn-Mayer).
    - Affirm Films library
      - Affirm Television library
      - Great American Pure Flix library (shared ownership with Great American Media)
  - TriStar Pictures film library (excluding the Carolco Pictures library, owned by StudioCanal (outside of Cliffhanger, which is still owned by TriStar in the U.S.) and films owned by third-party companies)
    - TriStar Productions library
  - Crunchyroll, LLC library (shared ownership with Sony Music Entertainment Japan's Aniplex)
    - Crunchyroll UK and Ireland library
    - Crunchyroll Store Australia library
    - Crunchyroll EMEA library
      - Crunchyroll SAS library
      - Crunchyroll SA library
      - Crunchyroll GmbH library
    - Crunchyroll Studios library
    - Crunchyroll Games library
    - Crunchyroll Store library
      - Right Stuf library
      - Nozomi Entertainment library
      - 5 Points Pictures library
      - Lucky Penny Entertainment library
      - RightStufAnime.com library
        - Mobile Suit Gundam library (in conjunction with Sunrise, Inc.)
        - Select Eleven Arts library (in conjunction with Eleven Arts) (other titles released by Shout! Factory)
        - Ponycan USA library (in conjunction with Pony Canyon)
        - Aniplex of America library (in conjunction with Aniplex of America)
  - Peanuts Worldwide library (80%) (stake owned with Sony Music Entertainment Japan, and 20% owned by Charles M. Schulz Creative Associates)

=== Television ===
- Sony Pictures Television
  - Adelaide Productions library
  - Gemstone Studios library
  - TriStar Television library
  - TOY Productions library
  - Tandem Productions library
  - ELP Communications library
    - Worldwide television distribution rights to the Embassy Pictures catalogue
  - Coca-Cola Telecommunications library (except for the '80s syndicated The Price is Right and Card Sharks by Mark Goodson Productions, which are owned by Fremantle North America)
    - Colex Enterprises library
  - Spelling-Goldberg Productions library (majority)
  - 2waytraffic library
    - 2waytraffic International library
  - Sony Pictures Television Nonfiction library
    - 19 Entertainment library
    - Sharp Entertainment library
    - B17 Entertainment library
    - The Intellectual Property Corporation library
    - Trilogy Films library
    - This Machine Filmworks library
    - Maxine Entertainment library
  - Bad Wolf library (excluding third-party television series)
  - Barry & Enright Productions library (post-1971 only)
  - Blueprint Television library
  - Barris Industries library
  - Culver Entertainment library
  - Electric Ray library
  - Eleventh Hour Films library
  - Eleven library
  - Embassy Row library
  - Fable Pictures library
  - Floresta (excluding third-parties, television series and films)
  - Huaso library
  - Human Media library
  - Lean-M library
  - Merv Griffin Enterprises library (except Dance Fever and The Merv Griffin Show, which are owned by Merv Griffin Entertainment)
  - Left Bank Pictures library
  - Palladium Fiction library
  - Playmaker Media library
  - Rastar Television library
    - Rastar Productions library
  - Satisfaction Group library (20%)
  - Sony Pictures Television Kids library
    - Chorion library
  - Stellify Media library
  - Stewart Television library (except the '70s The $25,000 Pyramid, which is owned by CBS)
  - Stolen Picture library
  - Teleset library
    - Teleset Mexico
  - Toro Media library
  - The Whisper Group library
- Aniplex library
  - A-1 Pictures library
  - CloverWorks library
  - Aniplex (Shanghai) Ltd. library (51%)
  - Boundary Inc. library
  - Myriagon Studio library
  - Peppermint Anime GmbH library (joint venture with Peppermint GmbH)
  - Quatro A Inc. library
  - Rialto Entertainment Inc. library
- Worldwide television distribution rights to the Revolution Studios and Morgan Creek Entertainment film libraries (under license from Content Partners LLC)

=== Music ===
- Sony Music Group
  - Sony Music Publishing
    - 4 Star Records discography
    - APM Music
      - Sonoton discography
      - Bruton Music discography
      - Cezame Music discography
      - Hard and Kosinus discography
    - Bleeding Fingers Music discography
    - Challenge Records discography
    - EMI Music Publishing discography
    - EMI Production Music discography (excluding music in public domain)
    - Extreme Music discography
    - Hickory Records discography
    - KPM Music
    - Remote Control Productions discography
  - Sony Music Entertainment
    - Columbia Records discography (excluding music in public domain)
      - Startime International discography
    - Epic Records discography
      - Alamo Records discography
      - Bad Boy Records discography
      - Freebandz discography
      - Ariola discography
      - Deutsche Harmonia Mundi discography
      - So So Def Recordings discography
      - Volcano Entertainment discography
    - Kemosabe Records discography
    - Legacy Recordings discography
      - Bell Records discography
      - BMG Heritage Records discography
      - Colpix Records/Colgems Records discography
      - J Records discography
      - Windham Hill Records discography
      - LaFace Records discography
      - Zomba Group of Companies discography
        - Battery Records discography
        - Jive Records discography
        - Jive Electro discography
        - Scotti Brothers Records discography
        - Zoo Entertainment discography
      - Buddah Records discography
      - Kama Sutra Records discography
      - Philadelphia International Records discography
      - Work Group discography
    - The Orchard discography
      - Blind Pig Records discography
      - Frenchkiss Records discography
      - RED Distribution discography
      - Shrapnel Records discography
      - TVT Records discography
    - RCA Records discography
      - RCA Inspiration discography
        - Fo Yo Soul discography
        - GospoCentric Records discography
          - B'Rite Music discography
        - Quiet Water Entertainment discography
        - Verity Records discography
    - Arista Records discography
    - Ultra Music discography
    - Sony Masterworks
      - Masterworks Broadway discography
      - Milan Records discography
      - Okeh Records discography (excluding musics on public domain)
      - Portrait Records discography
      - Sony Classical Records discography
    - Sony Music Australia discography
    - Sony Music Brasil discography
      - Amigo Records discography
      - Phonomotor Records discography
      - Som Livre discography
      - Austro Music
      - SLAP
      - Soma
      - Diretoria Funk
      - Inbraza
      - Sigem
    - Sony Music Canada discography
      - Ratas Music Group discography
    - Sony Music China discography
    - Sony Music France discography
    - Sony Music Entertainment Hong Kong discography
    - Sony Music Entertainment Poland discography
    - Sony Music India discography
    - Sony Music Indonesia discography
    - Sony Music Latin discography
    - Sony Music Mexico discography
    - Sony Music Nashville discography
      - Arista Nashville discography
      - Columbia Nashville discography
        - RCA Records Nashville discography
      - Provident Label Group discography
        - Essential Records discography
        - Flicker Records discography
        - Provident Films discography
        - Reunion Records discography
          - Beach Street Records discography
    - Sony Music Philippines discography
    - Sony Music Taiwan discography
    - Sony Music Thailand discography
      - Bakery Music discography
      - Sony BEC-TERO Music discography
    - Sony Music UK discography
      - Above Board library
      - Black Butter Records discography (49%)
      - Columbia Records UK discography
      - Dream Life Records discography
      - Insanity Records discography (joint venture with Insanity Group)
      - Magic Star discography
      - Ministry of Sound discography
      - Music for Nations discography
      - RCA Label Group UK discography
      - Relentless Records discography
      - Since '93 discography
      - Sony Commercial Group discography
      - Sony Music Legacy UK discography
      - Sony Music Nashville UK discography
      - United Records discography
    - Sony Music Entertainment Japan
      - Aniplex Music discography
      - Ariola Japan discography
      - Epic Records Japan discography
      - Ki/oon Music discography
      - Peanuts Worldwide library (80%) (stake owned with Sony Pictures, and 20% owned by Charles M. Schulz Creative Associates)
        - Fitz Beat discography
        - Haunted Records discography
        - Ki/oon Records2 discography
        - NeOSITE discography
        - Siren Song discography
        - Trefort discography
      - M-On Entertainment, Inc. discography
        - Music On! TV programming
      - Sacra Music discography
      - Sony Creative Products Inc. discography
      - Sony DADC Japan Inc. discography
      - Sony Music Artists Inc. discography
      - Sony Music Communications Inc. discography
      - Sony Music Direct (Japan) Inc. discography
      - Sony Music Labels Inc. discography
      - Sony Music Marketing Inc. discography
      - Sony Music Associated Records discography
      - Sony Music Publishing discography
      - Sony Music Records discography
        - gr8! Records discography
        - Mastersix Foundation discography
        - N46Div discography
        - Niagara Records discography
        - VVV Records discography

=== Sony Interactive Entertainment ===
- Audiokinetic library
- Bungie game library (excluding the Halo franchise, owned by Microsoft via Xbox Game Studios and Oni owned by Take-Two Interactive)
- Gaikai library
- PlayStation Productions library
- PlayStation Studios
  - Bluepoint Games game library
  - China Hero Project game library
  - Unties library
  - Dimps game library (joint venture with Bandai Namco)
    - Safari Games library
  - Firesprite game library
    - Fabrik Games library
  - Firewalk Studios library
  - ForwardWorks game library
  - Guerrilla Games library
  - Haven Studios game library
  - Housemarque game library
  - Insomniac Games library (with some exceptions)
    - Insomniac North Carolina library
  - Media Molecule game library
  - Naughty Dog game library (with some exceptions)
    - ICE Team game library
  - Nixxes Software game library (with some exceptions)
  - PlayStation Talents game library
  - Polyphony Digital game library
  - SCEE R&D game library
  - Bend Studio game library (excluding games distributed by Accolade, owned by Atari SA)
  - Team Asobi game library
  - London Studio game library
  - Malaysia Studio game library
  - San Diego Studio game library
  - San Mateo Studio game library
  - Santa Monica Studio game library
  - Savage Game Studios library
  - Sucker Punch Productions game library
  - Valkyrie Entertainment game library (with some exceptions)
  - Visual Arts game library
  - XDev game library (with some exceptions)
- SN Systems library
- Aniplex game library
  - ANIPLEX.EXE library
  - Lasengle game library

== See also ==
- List of assets owned by Sony
- List of Sony Pictures Television programs
