= Michael Hirsh (producer) =

Canadian animation producer (born 1948)

- Born: 8 February 1948 (age 78); Brussels, Belgium
- Occupations: Television producer, businessman
- Years active: 1971-present
- Employer(s): Nelvana (1971-2000); Corus Entertainment (2000-2002); Cookie Jar Group (2004-2012); DHX Media (2012-2015); Ezrin Hirsch Entertainment (2015-2016); Wow Unlimited Media (2016-2022); Kartoon Studios (2022-2023)

Michael Hirsh (born February 8, 1948) is a Canadian television producer and author. He co-founded Nelvana, a Toronto-based animation and entertainment studio, in 1971 with partners Patrick Loubert and Clive A. Smith; the company produced several animated shows including Beetlejuice, Franklin, Babar, The Magic School Bus, Rock & Rule, the Care Bears movies, and Donkey Kong Country, among others.

After Corus Entertainment's acquisition of Nelvana in 2000, Hirsh became the CEO of Cookie Jar Group, which produced numerous children's shows, among them being Arthur, Johnny Test, and Strawberry Shortcake. When Cookie Jar was acquired by DHX Media (now WildBrain), Hirsh became the Executive Chairman of the company, the largest supplier of kids' programming to online streaming services, as well as a leader in production and licensing and merchandising for children. Three years after the acquisition by DHX Media, Hirsh left the company to serve as CEO and chairman of WOW! Unlimited Media from 2015 to December 2023.

In 2024, Hirsh wrote his memoirs which were published by Sutherland House. Animation Nation is a frame by frame account of how creative talent and entrepreneurial zeal built a global cartoon empire.

== Early life ==
Hirsh was born in Brussels, Belgium. At the age of three his family emigrated to Toronto, Ontario, Canada. Both of his parents were Holocaust survivors, his mother hidden by nuns and his father was liberated on a Death March from a concentration camp.

At 13, Hirsh's family moved to New York where he attended the Bronx High School of Science. He started making experimental films after cutting high school classes to watch American underground cinema. Hirsh continued his studies at Antioch College in Yellow Springs, Ohio where he pursued filmmaking. Hirsh transferred to York University's Glendon College in the autumn of 1966 where he met his future business partners Jack Christie and Patrick Loubert.

== Career ==
=== Early career ===
Hirsh's first feature film co-directed and co-produced with Jack Christie, Voulez Vous Coucher Avec God? was inspired by political turmoil and took over six years to make. The satirical film shed light on topics such as fundamentalist religion, politics, racism, and sexism.

Hirsh, working with animator Marc Chinoy and college friends Patrick Loubert, Jack Christie, and Peter Dewdney made five alphabet inspired animated shorts for PBS's Sesame Street, learning the basics of animation as they went along. One episode of Drop-In was based on the history of the Canadian Whites, inspiring Hirsh to learn more about the comics published during the Second World War. Hirsh contacted John Ezrin, the most successful publisher of the Canadian Whites at the time. Tired of storing them, Ezrin sold the comics and rights to Hirsh and Loubert for $3,500.

In regard to the Canadian Whites, he co-authored a book and tv Documentary with Patrick Loubert called The Great Canadian Comics(book published by Peter Martin Associates 1971, documentary commissioned by CBC Telescope, 1971 and a National Gallery of Canada travelling exhibition.

=== Nelvana ===
In 1971, Hirsh, Loubert and Clive A. Smith founded Nelvana Limited, a new company with a focus on animation and a goal of creating a Canadian studio. The company got its name from Canadian/First Nations female comic book hero Nelvana of the Northern Lights, one of the comic books they acquired from John Ezrin known as the Canadian Whites.

In 1977, Nelvana released A Cosmic Christmas, an animated sci-fi Christmas television special distributed in the U.S. and Canada that caught the attention of George Lucas who watched the special and contacted Nelvana while they were working on a Halloween special, titled The Devil and Daniel Mouse.

Lucas hired Nelvana to help produce a cartoon for the Star Wars Holiday Special that was broadcast on CBS on 17 November 1978. The cartoon introduced Boba Fett, the iconic Star Wars character. Years later, the cartoon became available to watch again in 2021 on Disney+.

Later, Nelvana partnered with Lucasfilm and expanded the Star Wars franchise once again with Star Wars: Droids featuring the continuing adventures of R2-D2 and C-3PO and Ewoks, two Saturday morning series.

In 1983, Nelvana released its first animated film Rock & Rule featuring original music by Debbie Harry, Lou Reed, Iggy Pop, Cheap Trick and funk group Earth, Wind and Fire. The film was distributed by MGM/UA and Orion.

In 1983, Nelvana produced The Care Bears Movie, which was distributed by The Samuel Goldwyn Co, and broke the record for an animated movie not produced by the Disney Studio. The film won the Golden Reel Award that year in Canada.

In 1987, Hirsh acquired the rights for Babar from The Clifford Ross Company and produced 65 half-hours for HBO, CBC and broadcasters all over the world. The series was produced with Europe-based Ellipse and led to the joint venture studio Le Studio Ellipse. Together with Ross, Nelvana licensed merchandising for Babar and honoured the event with a party that featured an elephant on the mezzanine floor at FAO Schwartz in New York City.

In 1988, Nelvana and Scholastic Corporation produced a direct-to-video series of The Video Adventures of Clifford the Big Red Dog based on the 1962 book. The company's fourth live-action series, T. and T., premiered in 1988 on Canada's Global network. The show starred Mr. T of The A-Team fame, playing a former boxer named T.S. Turner. The station was syndicated in the US. Nelvana faced bankruptcy when the show's original U.S. distributor, Qintex Entertainment (formerly Hal Roach Studios) was going out of business. In six weeks, they were saved when they found a replacement for their US distribution. In 1989, Hirsh produced the animated Beetlejuice series based on the Tim Burton motion picture and won its first Emmy.

Hirsh specialized in working with publishers and authors to adapt their books including Maurice Sendak's Little Bear, Joanna Cole's The Magic School Bus, Franklin the Turtle, The Neverending Story, Pippi Longstocking, Cadillacs and Dinosaurs, Miss Spider's Tea Party, Max & Ruby, The Berenstain Bears, and the British comic strip Rupert Bear. Nelvana had self-made successes of its own during the 1990s, such as Stickin' Around, Dog City (with The Jim Henson Company) and Ned's Newt (with TMO-Loonland). Working with great comedians, Nelvana produced the animated versions of Roseanne Barr's Little Rosey and Jim Carrey's Ace Ventura Pet Detective.

In 1994, Nelvana went public on the Toronto Stock Exchange (TSX) working with RBC's Bruce Rothney and George Dembroski. As a public company Nelvana was able to raise enough funding to dramatically increase the production levels Nelvana could take on. It also financed the acquisitions of Kids Can Press, Windlight Studio, and Klutz.

The company's first two computer-animated shows, Donkey Kong Country (Fox Kids) and Rolie Polie Olie premiered on the US Disney Channel in 1998. Rolie Polie Ollie went on to win many awards, including seven Emmy Awards.

In 1998, Nelvana entered into an agreement with U.S. network CBS to program a new Saturday morning animation block for the 1998-99 television season, which would be branded as CBS Kidshow. The block would feature six new series based on children's book properties, and all were to comply with the U.S. governments educational programming guidelines. In April 1998, Nelvana entered into an agreement with ITV franchise Scottish Television to co-produce these new series and hold distribution rights to them in the United Kingdom. In August 1998, Nelvana acquired Kids Can Press, publishers of the Franklin and Elliot Moose children's books upon which the Franklin and Elliot Moose were based. This turned them into an "integrated company" in which Kids Can's subsequent publications would begin with Nelvana's franchising of those works.

In 1999, Nelvana agreed to produce the PBS stations' first Saturday morning block of animated programming which would launch in the autumn of 2000. The programs that formed the PBS Kids Bookworm Bunch were all based on children's books: Corduroy (by Don Freeman), Elliot Moose (by Andrea Beck), Timothy Goes to School (by Rosemary Wells), Seven Little Monsters (by Maurice Sendak), George Shrinks (by William Joyce), and Marvin the Tap-Dancing Horse (by Betty and Michael Paraskevas). In addition, Nelvana produced a weekday-morning series for the PBS network: Jan and Stan's Berenstain Bears.

By the end of the 1990s, Nelvana was the leading independent animation company in North America with more shows on US TV than any other network. The company also dominated the global market through that same period.

=== Corus sale ===
In September 2000, Corus Entertainment bought Nelvana for $544 million. The company saw the purchase as being a complement to its children's TV networks, including YTV and Treehouse. Corus already owned 6% of Nelvana, and took on the company's $75 million debt.

While at Corus, Hirsh worked on Beyblade, Nelvana's biggest hit during his time. Broadcast on YTV and Cartoon Network, the Japanese anime based on a line of spinning-top toys generated billions of dollars of toy sales from a toy deal with Hasbro that Nelvana negotiated.

Hirsh worked on Max & Ruby, based on books by Rosemary Wells, a preschool series about two anthro sibling rabbits Two years after the sale, Hirsh left Nelvana.

=== Cookie Jar Group ===
After winning an auction in 2004, Hirsh and former Nelvana president Toper Taylor working with Toronto's Dominion Private Equity Partners (now Birch Hill) and Omers acquired Quebec-based CINAR for more than $190 million. Two weeks after its purchase, on 29 March, CINAR was renamed to Cookie Jar based on a suggestion by author Huck Scarry.

Prior to the acquisition, CINAR was facing serious legal trouble. With new leadership, Hirsh and team were able to resolve many of the company's legal and public affairs.

The first series produced by Cookie Jar after Hirsh's acquisition was Busytown Mysteries based on the book series created by Richard Scarry and Doodlebops. Hirsh began developing Doodlebops with co-creator Carl Lennox after agreeing to do a music show with Head of CBC Kids Cheryl Hassan. US broadcaster Disney Channel bought the show after positive test screenings. With the support of Disney, Hirsh and Taylor were successful in bringing Feld Entertainment in to organize a musical tour of the show's characters across the U.S. and Canada. The Doodlebops went on to be a hit show, inspiring appearances at Walt Disney World and American nationwide tours for two years.

Caillou, an animated television show for preschoolers, was one of the properties inherited through CINAR. Hirsh facilitated settling a lawsuit between CINAR and Caillou's author and illustrator, Christine L'Heureux and Helene Desputeaux. At the time, Caillou was successful on PBS in the US and a hit in merchandising and publishing in every country such as Turkey, Spain, and Brazil.

Other properties inherited included Arthur, a major hit on PBS, CBC, and the BBC. Cookie Jar continued to produce Arthur, resulting in six Emmy Awards. Cookie Jar faced a turning point when Warner Bros. auctioned off the rights to produce Johnny Test. The highly-rated comedy created by Scott Fellows (writer of Nickelodeon) and produced by Cookie Jar lasted six seasons and was a global hit for broadcasters around the world including Cartoon Network, Teletoon (since bought by Cartoon Network) and Netflix.

On 20 June 2008, Cookie Jar Group announced a deal to acquire DIC Entertainment from CEO Andy Heyward. On 23 July 2008, the acquisition was completed, and eventually DIC was folded into Cookie Jar's entertainment division. Through that acquisition Cookie Jar also acquired Copyright Promotions Licensing Group (now WildBrain CPLG). Cookie Jar now had more than 6,000 half-hours of programming as well as rights to several children's brands.

During the 2008 financial crisis, Cookie Jar's team was desperately looking for new ways to generate money to combat the onset of financial hardships they were facing. Hirsh and Taylor focused their efforts on selling Cookie Jar's library of kids shows to streaming platforms. Noticing the increasing popularity of streaming services, Hirsh and team started digitizing their library of children's shows. Hirsh began selling off shows to global streamer Netflix in 2010. Netflix acquired properties such as Calliou, Johnny Test, and Doodlebops.

By 2012, Cookie Jar (now DHX Media) was the largest supplier of kids cartoons to Netflix and other streaming platforms.

Acquisition by DHX Media

On 20 August 2012, DHX Media (now WildBrain) announced that they would acquire Cookie Jar Group for $111 million; the purchase made DHX the world's largest independent owner of children's television programming. The acquisition was completed on 22 October 2012.

Season 6 of Johnny Test was produced by Cookie Jar under the auspices of DHX Media after the merger, and the studio officially closed down after said series concluded its run on 25 December 2014.

Hirsh stayed on after the merger as Executive Chairman and worked on projects like Supernoobs, Dr. Dimensionpants, and Ella the Elephant. Hirsh also developed a new Inspector Gadget series for Netflix.

In 2017, after seeing success in streaming, Hirsh and Taylor negotiated a deal with YouTube for their SVOD (Subscription Video on Demand) service and launched ten channels in multiple languages across their platform. Despite a rocky start, Hirsh felt YouTube would be a successful place for Cookie Jar's library. Together with Michael Donovan and Steven DeNure, Hirsh focused on building a proprietary cartoon business on YouTube using the company's vast library. When Hirsh left DHX they had become the world's leading independent animation company.

=== WOW Unlimited Media Inc. ===
After leaving DHX, Hirsh met with Randy Lennox and agreed to create another kids' entertainment company. Enlisting Bob Ezrin and Neil Chakravarti, the group thought they would have better results combining several existing companies to create one new one. Hirsh brought CGI animation studio Rainmaker Entertainment (now Mainframe Studios) with US television and animation producer Fred Seibert's company, Frederator Studios and Frederator Networks. This would be the beginning of WOW! Unlimited Media. Hirsh oversaw hit television programs including Castlevania, Bee and Puppycat, Madagascar: A Little Wild, and Octonauts.

In 2022, Hirsh together with Chakravarti and CFO John Vandervelde sold WOW! Unlimited to Genius Brands (now Kartoon Studios) led by CEO Andy Heyward, for $53 million. Heyward and Hirsh have enjoyed a long history starting with the production together of Inspector Gadget, followed by Hirsh's acquisition of DIC led by Heyward and finally Genius Brand's acquisition of WOW! Unlimited.

Hirsh served as CEO and chairman for the holding company, with Seibert as Chief Creative Officer and CEO of Frederator. Hirsh left WOW! in December 2023.

=== Floating Island Entertainment ===
In 2014, Michael Hirsh founded Floating Island Entertainment, where he continues to serve as CEO and Executive Producer.

== Personal life ==
Hirsh has been with his wife since 1973. They have one son and live in Toronto.

As the child of two Holocaust survivors, Hirsh visited Auschwitz in 2015 on the suggestion of Eli Rubenstein to celebrate the 70th Anniversary of the camp's liberation. In 1995, Hirsh's father, Jack Hirsh, testified about his wartime experience to an interviewer from Spielberg-founded Shoah Foundation.

Both of Hirsh's grandfathers and step-grandmother died in the camps, while his maternal grandmother suffered from PTSD as a result of the war. Hirsh credits his success to his parents' resilience and strength.

=== Awards ===
A number of productions that Michael has been involved with have been nominated for or won awards. For their work on shows including Beetlejuice, Babar, Little Bear, Rupert, Franklin, Rolie Polie Olie and The Adventures of Tintin, Hirsh and his colleagues have received awards such as Daytime Emmys and Geminis.
