= Oh Yeah! Cartoons =

American animation showcase series on Nickelodeon

- Genre: Animation; Comedy; Variety; Cartoon series
- Created by: Fred Seibert
- Presented by: Various schoolchildren; Kenan Thompson; Josh Server
- Voices of: Tom Kenny; Grey DeLisle; Tara Strong; Kevin Michael Richardson
- Theme music composer: Bill Burnett
- Country of origin: United States
- Original language: English
- No. of seasons: 3
- No. of episodes: 34 (101 segments) (list of episodes)

Production
- Executive producers: Fred Seibert; Larry Huber
- Producer: Bill Burnett
- Running time: 23 minutes
- Production companies: Frederator Incorporated; Nickelodeon Animation Studios

Original release
- Network: Nickelodeon
- Release: July 19, 1998 – August 30, 2002

Related
- The Fairly OddParents; ChalkZone; My Life as a Teenage Robot; Random! Cartoons

Oh Yeah! Cartoons is an American animated anthology series that aired on Nickelodeon. Created by Fred Seibert, it was produced by Nickelodeon Animation Studios in association with Frederator Incorporated (Note: Per the Nicktoons logo at the end of each episode: "Produced at the Nickelodeon Animation Studios, Burbank, California.") and aired as part of Nickelodeon's Nicktoons lineup. In the show's first season, it was hosted by a variety of schoolchildren, and the second season was hosted by Kenan Thompson of All That and Kenan & Kel, and later Josh Server of All That in the third and final season. Bill Burnett composed the show's theme music.

In terms of total volume, Oh Yeah! Cartoons remains TV's biggest animation development program ever. Giving several dozen filmmakers the opportunity to create 96 seven-minute cartoons, the series eventually yielded three dedicated half-hour spin-off shows produced by Frederator: The Fairly OddParents, ChalkZone, and My Life as a Teenage Robot.

Nickelodeon's Oh Yeah! featured in its first season a total of 39 brand new seven-minute cartoons, surpassing the number of new cartoons and characters on any other single network. In its full run, Oh Yeah! Cartoons featured and produced 96 cartoons.

Many of the animated shorts were created by cartoonists who later became more prominent, including Bob Boyle, Bill Burnett, Jaime Diaz, Greg Emison, John Eng, Thomas R. Fitzgerald, John Fountain, Antoine Guilbaud, Butch Hartman, Larry Huber, Ken Kessel, Alex Kirwan, Steve Marmel, Seth MacFarlane, Zac Moncrief, Carlos Ramos, Rob Renzetti, C. Miles Thompson, Byron Vaughns, Pat Ventura, Vincent Waller, and Dave Wasson.

Many of its animators featured had worked two years earlier on Cartoon Network's What a Cartoon!, produced in the same concept by Hanna-Barbera and Cartoon Network Studios, which was also created by Seibert while he was president of that historical studio. Seibert created Random! Cartoons as a sequel anthology. While originally intended as a fourth season of Oh Yeah! Cartoons, it ended up being made as another show. Random! Cartoons aired on Nicktoons from 2008 to 2009.

== Legacy ==
Oh Yeah! Cartoons is the second Frederator short cartoon incubator. Frederator Studios has persisted in the tradition of surfacing new talent, characters, and series with several cartoon shorts "incubators," including (as of 2016): What A Cartoon! (Cartoon Network, 1995), The Meth Minute 39 (Channel Frederator, 2008), Random! Cartoons (Nickelodeon/Nicktoons, 2008), Too Cool! Cartoons (Cartoon Hangover, 2012), and GO! Cartoons (Cartoon Hangover, 2017). These laboratories have spun off notable series like: Dexter's Laboratory, The Powerpuff Girls, ChalkZone, Johnny Bravo, Cow and Chicken, My Life as a Teenage Robot, Courage the Cowardly Dog, The Fairly OddParents, Nite Fite, Fanboy & Chum Chum, Adventure Time, Bravest Warriors, Rocket Dog, and Bee and PuppyCat.

== Episodes ==
Season	Segments	Episodes	Originally released		Hosted by
Season	Segments	Episodes	First released	Last released	Hosted by
1	38	13	July 19, 1998	October 18, 1998	N/A
2	39	13	September 18, 1999	December 18, 1999	Kenan Thompson
3	24	8	March 23, 2002	August 30, 2002	Josh Server

== Similar shows ==
- Random! Cartoons (Nicktoons)
- Disney's Raw Toonage (CBS)
- What a Cartoon! (Cartoon Network)
- Shorty McShorts' Shorts (Disney Channel)
- KaBlam! (Nickelodeon)
- Short Circutz (YTV)
- The Cartoonstitute (Cartoon Network)
- DC Nation Shorts (Cartoon Network)
- Liquid Television (MTV)

== See also ==
- Spike and Mike's Festival of Animation
- Liquid Television
- Disney's Raw Toonage
- What a Cartoon!
- KaBlam!
- Cartoon Sushi
- Funpak
- Exposure
- Eye Drops
- VH1 ILL-ustrated
- Nicktoons Film Festival
- Shorty McShorts' Shorts
- Wedgies
- Random! Cartoons
- The Cartoonstitute
- Off the Air
- Nickelodeon Animated Shorts Program
- Too Cool! Cartoons
- Cartoon Network Shorts Department
- TripTank
- Disney XD Shortstop
- Go! Cartoons
- Love, Death & Robots
