= Random! Cartoons =

Television series

- Genre: Animation; Comedy; Variety; Cartoon series
- Created by: Fred Seibert
- Theme music composer: The Bunker New York
- Country of origin: United States
- Original language: English
- No. of seasons: 1
- No. of episodes: 13 (39 segments)

Production
- Executive producers: Fred Seibert; Larry Huber
- Producer: Kevin Kolde
- Running time: 21 minutes
- Production companies: Frederator Incorporated; Nickelodeon Animation Studios

Original release
- Network: Nicktoons
- Release: December 6, 2008 – December 20, 2009

Related
- Oh Yeah! Cartoons; Fanboy & Chum Chum; Adventure Time; Bravest Warriors

Random! Cartoons is an American animated anthology series that aired on Nicktoons. Much like Oh Yeah! Cartoons, it was created by Fred Seibert and produced by Frederator Incorporated and Nickelodeon Animation Studios. It premiered on December 6, 2008, and ended on December 20, 2009.

== Production ==
Series creator Fred Seibert ordered 13 half-hour episodes (39 7-minute segments) for the series, which was originally announced in 2005 as the fourth season of Oh Yeah! Cartoons. Production on the series started in 2005 and ended in 2007. Originally slated to air on Nickelodeon by the end of 2007, it was later halted for release in 2008 on the separate Nicktoons Network channel. The shorts were first released on air and online individually in January 2007.

Unlike Oh Yeah! Cartoons, there is no host. On January 10, 2006, ASIFA-Hollywood hosted an advance screening of six shorts as well as a Q&A session with the filmmakers at the Nicktoons Studios in Burbank, California. Two of the shorts were selected to become television series and one of the shorts was selected to become a web series. Those shorts were Adventure Time, The Bravest Warriors and Fanboy. Adventure Time began airing as a full-length series on April 5, 2010, on Cartoon Network. The Bravest Warriors, under the new name Bravest Warriors, began airing on November 8, 2012, on Cartoon Hangover. Fanboy, under the new name Fanboy & Chum Chum, began airing as a full-length series on November 7, 2009, on Nickelodeon. Animation historian Jerry Beck created on the short for the series Hornswiggle, which was originally conceived as a Terrytoons short featuring one of its characters, Sidney the Elephant. However, it was retooled due to, at the time, licensing issues from its parent company Viacom.

== List of episodes ==
No.	Title	Created by	Cast	Series/Short	Original release date
1a	"Solomon Fix"	Doug TenNapel	Rob Paulsen as Solomon Fix; John DiMaggio as Mumpy; Maurice LaMarche as Klemp; Elijah Runcorn as Ned; Doug TenNapel as Chipmunk #1 & 2	Short	December 6, 2008
A teddy bear named Solomon Fix is assigned to protect a child named Ned, only that the child finds him lame.
1b	"MooBeard the Cow Pirate"	Kyle A. Carrozza	Billy West as MooBeard / Value Guy; Erica Luttrell as Sailor Bird / Road Show Announcer; Dave "Gruber" Allen as Darkblade of Fire; Kyle A. Carrozza as Ungus the Unpleasant / Cow Eating Gentleman	Short	December 6, 2008
Cow pirate MooBeard and his companion Sailor Bird search for the treasure of the lost island of Hookamookapookalap.
1c	"Two Witch Sisters"	Niki Yang	S. Scott Bullock as Dorothy / Hummingbird; Dee Bradley Baker as Carrot / Seymour; Candi Milo as Bee; Niki Yang as Baby Rabbit	Short	December 6, 2008
Twin witch sisters cause magic-induced havoc at a park.
2a	"The Finster Finster Show!: Store Wars"	Jeff DeGrandis	Billy West as Finster 1 Charlie Adler as Finster 2 Tress MacNeille as Finsters' Mom	Short	December 7, 2008
The Finsters battle anthropomorphic frozen chickens in the supermarket.
2b	"Adventure Time"	Pendleton Ward	Zack Shada as Penn; John DiMaggio as Jake / Ice Clops; Paige Moss as Princess Bubblegum; John Kassir as Ice King / Fire Element; Dee Bradley Baker as Lady Rainicorn / Snow Golem; Pendleton Ward as Abraham Lincoln / Old Man	TV series	December 7, 2008
In this precursor to what would become the critically acclaimed full-length series, Finn (known as "Pen" in the short) and Jake battle the Ice King to save Princess Bubblegum.
2c	"Mind the Kitty"	Anne Walker Farrell	Dee Bradley Baker as the Duck/Tabby; Jeff Bennett as Punky; Rodger Bumpass as Lemurman; Lynne Maclean as Tabby's Mom	Short	December 7, 2008
Three teens have to babysit a psychotic kitten girl.
3a	"Ivan the Unbearable"	Andrew Dickman	Jeff Doucette as Ivan the Unbearable/Olaf; Maurice LaMarche as Bjorn/Working Troll #1; Tress MacNeille as Ma; Andrew Dickman as Filthy Viking/Working Troll #2	Short	December 13, 2008
A clumsy Viking gets hiccups that causes destruction.
3b	"Boneheads"	Hiroshi Chida	John Kassir as Bone/Soldier Flies; Dee Bradley Baker as Roccos/Audrey/Antarctic Bull Snail/Rex; Hadley Hudson as Striker (uncredited)	Short	December 13, 2008
Roccos and Bone search for babanas.
3c	"Tiffany"	Adam Henry	Jessie Flower as Peggy; Colleen Villard as Tiffany; David Busch as Dad/Jockey/Racetrack Announcer	Short	December 13, 2008
A doll must help her friend overcome a fear of horses.
4a	"Call Me Bessie!"	Diane Kredensor and Dana Galin	Audrey Wasilewski as Bessie; Fred Stoller as Al; Dee Bradley Baker as Senor Swampy/Turkey/Dolphins	Short	December 20, 2008
A cow enrolls her elephant friend in a scuba-diving class... but her friend does not want to go!
4b	"Teapot"	Greg Eagles	Greg Eagles as Teapot/James Brown Clock/Silkbone/Blind Guy/Body Guard; Cathy Lewis as Bouche; Hilda Boulware as Mother's Voice; Chara Hammonds as Video Vixen#1 & 2 deMann as Announcer	Short	December 20, 2008
Two African-American kids who are fans of rap music are going to meet a famous rapper.
4c	"Hornswiggle"	Jerry Beck	René Auberjonois as Hornswiggle/Apeman #2; Jeff Bennett as Zan-Tar/Apeman #1; Maurice LaMarche as Birdsdorf, Apeman #3; Cheryl Chase as Nurses #1 & 2	Short	December 20, 2008
A crazy rhino meets his hero, Zantar. He tries to help but physically hurts him.
5a	"Hero Heights"	Raul Aguirre Jr. and Bill Ho	Jessica DiCicco as Smart Alec/Plasma Tot; Annie Mumolo as Strikeout; Hynden Walch as Olympia/Ms. Chic; Raul Aguirre as Razorklaw; Becky Thyre as Electricia; Karen Malina White as Mindy 500	Short	December 27, 2008
In a town where everyone's a superhero, two best friends fight over the new girl in town.
5b	"Yaki & Yumi"	Aliki Theofilopoulous	André Sogliuzzo as Yaki/Contest Judge; Candi Milo as Yumi/Octopus Dude; Aliki Theofilopolous as Sweet Little Girl/Fortune Fish/Kid #1	Short	December 27, 2008
A bat and a dragon participate in a dance competition.
5c	"Gary Guitar"	Bill Plympton	Lloyd Floyd as Gary Guitar; Becky Poole as Vera Violin; Stephen Largay as Danny Drum	Short	December 27, 2008
A guitar tries to make the perfect picnic for his girlfriend, a violin.
6a	"Krunch and the Kid"	Adam Henry	Kevin Michael Richardson as Krunch/Rastamon/Alarm Clock/Announcer; Colleen Villard as Skippy/Little Girl/Some Kid; Mark Hamill as Frank; Karen Henry as Perky Tour Guide	Short	January 3, 2009
A monster named Krunch has trouble performing on a TV show after his pet frog dies.
6b	"Bradwurst"	Angelo Di Nallo and Jason Plapp	Tom Kenny as Bradwurst/Jerry; Raphael Sbarge as Willy; Jeff Bennett as Charlie; J. P. Manoux as Gus	Short	January 3, 2009
A grumpy sausage sabotages his friends' party.
6c	"Dr. Froyd's Funny Farm"	Bill Burnett and Jaime Diaz	Robert Cait as Dr. Froyd; Nika Futterman as Lulu; Candi Milo as Nurse Duckett; Charlie Adler as Bossy LeCow/Raging Bullfrog	Short	January 3, 2009
Dr. Froyd needs someone to test out a science experiment, but none of the animals on his funny farm want to.
7a	"The Bravest Warriors"	Pendleton Ward	Charlie Schlatter as Chris; Tara Strong as Beth; Dan Finnerty as Wallow; Rob Paulsen as Danny; Polly Lou Livingston as Slippy Napkins; Noah Nelson as Professor Brain Dog 7	Web series	January 10, 2009
Four human teens, Chris, Beth, Wallow and Danny, save the brain dogs from the tickle monster in outer space.
7b	"Giovanni and Navarro, The Dangerous Duck Brothers: Saps at the Wheel"	Pat Ventura	Jim MacGeorge as Giovanni; Chuck McCann as Navarro; Jeff Bennett as Dog	Short	January 10, 2009
Two ducks want to break a dangerous record.
7c	"Sparkles and Gloom"	Melissa Wolfe and Anne Walker Farrell	Kari Wahlgren as Sparkles/Mom/Leprechaun; Jessica DiCicco as Gloom/Fuzzy Animal; Kevin Michael Richardson as Dad / Announcer / Zit / Applause Fish; Annie Mumolo as Pixie / Little Prince / Munchie	Short	January 10, 2009
Sparkles and Gloom, two daughters of a handsome prince and an evil witch, have their powers switched before the talent show at the Geevil School, the good and evil school, where good and evil are best friends.
8a	"The Infinite Goliath"	Erik Knutson and Mike Gray	Kevin Michael Richardson as Infinite Goliath/Hondo/Mechaneck; Alanna Ubach as Roger/Mrs. Abbott/Samantha; S. Scott Bullock as Mr. Abbott/Dr. Carnage/Timmy	Short	January 17, 2009
The Infinite Goliath, a super villain released on parole, moves into a neighborhood.
8b	"Kyle + Rosemary"	Jun Falkenstein	Wil Wheaton as Kyle/Sir Horace; Jentle Phoenix as Rosemary/Lunarella; Alexander Polinsky as Harold/Elf; Charlie Schlatter as Willy/Gnome/Martin/Dwarf; Aliki Theofilopoulous as Crimson	Short	January 17, 2009
A geek and a goth who play MMORPG games must break their shells to be together.
8c	"Garlic Boy"	John R. Dilworth	Gary Littman as Garlic Boy; Gerrianne Raphael as Garlic Boy's Mom; Erik Bergmann as Garlic Boy's Dad; Betsy Beutler as Parsley; Lloyd Floyd as Fungus; John R. Dilworth as Twin #1/Twin #2	Short	January 17, 2009
An anthropomorphic garlic with a healing tonic wants to do good for folks.
9a	"Flavio"	Mike Milo	Rob Paulsen as Flavio; Robert Costanzo as Bossman; Stephen Stanton as Mr. Frank; John Mariano as Leonardo da Vinci/Mayor	Short	January 24, 2009
An Italian goat wishes to be an inventor.
9b	"SamSquatch"	Adam Muto	Max Burkholder as SamSquatch; Daran Norris as Conrad Conard; Dee Bradley Baker as Nessie, Karl, Momsquatch; Ja'net DuBois as Mom	Short	January 24, 2009
A cryptid hunter finds a Bigfoot named SamSquatch.
9c	"Girls on the Go!: First Date"	Aliki Theofilopoulous	Danica McKellar as Kat; Frankie Ingrassia as Tess; Quinton Flynn as Spencer Applebaum/Spencer Spencerson/Student; LaTonya Holmes; Aliki Theofilopoulos	Short	January 24, 2009
Katerina Metropolis is a hopeless romantic teenager who daydreams about meeting the perfect boy. But how will she manage after she winds up on the worst date of her life?
10a	"Victor the Delivery Dog"	Niki Yang	E.G. Daily as Victor/One-Eyed Bird/Co-Worker #1; Jennifer Hale as Victor's Mom/Express Mail/Co-Worker #3; S. Scott Bullock as Gi/Raffe/Co-Worker #2; Fred Tatasciore as Mr. Papier	Short	January 31, 2009
Victor has to make deliveries before dinnertime.
10b	"Bronk and Bongo: Losing Patients"	Manny Galán and Alan Goodman	Steve Purnick as Bronk/Dinosaur; Joel McCrary as Bongo/Skeleton; Adam Busch as Jerry/Orderly; Jeff Bennett as Patient/Geezer/Workman; Manny Galan as Angry Erik; Alan Goodman as Ted Strawberry Head	Short	January 31, 2009
Bronk and Bongo are a couple of dogs who are mistaken to be world-famous German doctors in this madcap, zany romp.
10c	"Thom Cat"	Mike Gray	Jim Meskimen as Thom Cat/Neighbor John/Stumpy; Annie Mumolo as Melissa/Rusty/Patch	Short	January 31, 2009
A talking cat helps a troubled girl from a bully.
11a	"Sugarfoot"	Erik Knutson	Charlie Schlatter as Sugarfoot; Dee Bradley Baker as Socko and Delivery Man; Jennifer Hale as Ms. Penelope	Short	April 4, 2009
A boy who is a fan of cowboys and dinosaurs goes to a field trip to a museum with both of his interests while dealing with a bully.
11b	"Dugly Uckling's Treasure Quest"	Guy Vasilovich	John Kassir as Dugly Uckling/Kung Pao Bunny; Carlos Alazraqui as Quiggins/Bobblehead; James Sie as Narrator/Monkeybutt	Short	April 4, 2009
Dugly Uckling and his ragtag crew are out to solve the mystery of the Golden Bobblehead. Battling their way through the swamp, jungles, and killer mosquitoes, they come to a place where only Dugly's nonsensical logic can save the day.
11c	"Dr. Dee & BitBoy"	Jun-Kyo Seo, Kong-Yo Kang, and Larry Huber	Phil Nee as Dr. Dee/Bomba; Brett Pels as Zero (Bitboy)/Flower Wicky/Shop Owner; Jennie Kwan as Myang Myang (Bitgirl)/Edu; Maurice LaMarche as Pickle Cop/Elecaptain Sam/Dog Catcher; Charles Kim as Black Violet; Lloyd Sherr as Narrator	Short	April 4, 2009
Two kids and a scientist in a dog suit stop a corporation from creating a donut addiction.
12a	"Super John Doe Junior"	Lincoln Peirce	Jim Connor as Super John Doe; John Zee as Mayor; Marc Graue as Anchorman; Betsy Foldes as Mom; Kimberly Brooks as Super John Doe, Jr. David Shaughnessey as Blimey; Sandy Fox as Robin; Andy Morris as Evil Butthead	Short	April 11, 2009
The son of a superhero, who has no powers, decided to take his dad's place and fight against his nemesis.
12b	"6 Monsters"	Fred Seibert and Alan Goodman	Jeff Bennett as Grandpa/Gaillard; Chuck McCann as Buck; John DiMaggio as Roy; Nika Futterman as Cathy; Teresa Ganzel as Lulu	Short	April 11, 2009
Adventures of six monsters in middle school presented in different styles of animation (traditional, CGI, Flash, and digital ink and paint).
12c	"Ratz-A-Fratz"	Jim Wyatt and Karl Toerge	Jess Harnell as Crank/Man at Cookie Nook; June Foray as Mall Walker/Old Man #1/Man at Garbage Can; Debi Derryberry as Pop Singer/Teen at Cookie Nook; Scott Fresina as Urban; Jim Wyatt as Cyrus; Don Cameron as Swuawk/Old Man #2	Short	April 11, 2009
Three hungry rats must escape a security guard.
13a	"Lance & Zoopie: Squirly Town"	Doug TenNapel	Stephen Root as Lance; Bobcat Goldthwait as Zoopie; Keone Young as Flashback Lance & Zoopie	Short	August 16, 2009
A sly hyperactive squirrel takes his germaphobe strait-laced friend on an adventure to clear his aching head.
13b	"Fanboy"	Eric Robles	David Hornsby as Fanboy; Nancy Cartwright as Chum-Chum; Don LaFontaine as Announcer; Jeff Bennett as Fanman, Lenny; Kevin Michael Richardson as The Ice Monster	TV series	November 28, 2009
Two kids in superhero costumes purchase their favorite drink and end up creating an ice monster.
13c	"HandyCat: Bees-ness As Usual"	Russ Harris and G. Brian Reynolds	Rob Paulsen as Handycat/Drillbit; June Foray as Woman	Short	December 20, 2009
On their first day on the job, a handyman feline and his dog try to get rid of some pesky bees in hoping for a second job.

== Legacy ==
Random! Cartoons is the third Frederator Studios short cartoon shorts "incubator" for Nickelodeon. Frederator has persisted in the tradition of surfacing new talent, characters and series with several cartoon shorts "incubators," including (as of 2016): What a Cartoon! (Cartoon Network, 1995), Oh Yeah! Cartoons (Nickelodeon, 1998), Nicktoons Film Festival (Nickelodeon/Nicktoons, 2004), The Meth Minute 39 (Channel Frederator, 2008), Random! Cartoons (Nickelodeon/Nicktoons, 2008), Too Cool! Cartoons (Cartoon Hangover, 2012), and GO! Cartoons (Cartoon Hangover, 2016). These laboratories have spun off notable series like: Dexter's Laboratory, The Powerpuff Girls, Johnny Bravo, Cow & Chicken, Courage the Cowardly Dog, Larry & Steve (which was the basis for Fox's own Family Guy), Kenny and the Chimp (which was the basis for Codename: Kids Next Door), Grim & Evil (which was split into Evil Con Carne and The Grim Adventures of Billy & Mandy), The Fairly OddParents, My Life as a Teenage Robot, ChalkZone, Nite Fite, Fanboy & Chum Chum, Adventure Time, Bravest Warriors, Rocket Dog, and Bee and PuppyCat.

== Filmography ==
- Fred Seibert cartoon shorts filmography
