= List of Oh Yeah! Cartoons episodes =

List of episodes of the American animated television showcase series Oh Yeah! Cartoons

This is a complete episode list for the cartoon shorts incubator showcase Oh Yeah! Cartoons, produced by Nickelodeon Animation Studios in association with Frederator Incorporated.

== Series overview ==
Season	Segments	Episodes	Originally released		Hosted by
Season	Segments	Episodes	First released	Last released	Hosted by
1	38	13	July 19, 1998	October 18, 1998	N/A
2	39	13	September 18, 1999	December 18, 1999	Kenan Thompson
3	24	8	March 23, 2002	August 30, 2002	Josh Server

== Episodes ==
=== Season 1 (1998) ===
Hosted by various school kids from Brooklyn.

No.	Title	Created by	Original release date
1a	"ChalkZone"	Bill Burnett and Larry Huber	July 19, 1998
A young boy named Rudy Tabootie discovers ChalkZone, a world made of living chalk drawings. He meets up with Snap, one of his creations, and teams up with him to defeat a monster.
1b	"Slap T. Pooch in What is Funny?"	Bill Burnett and Vincent Waller	July 19, 1998
Slap T. Pooch attempts to ask the audience how he can make himself and his cartoon funny.
1c	"Jelly's Day"	Bill Burnett and Greg Emison	July 19, 1998
When Jelly is visited by her weird cousin Hargus, she decides to take him to the beach. Coming Attraction: Cat and Milkman
2a	"The F-Tales"	Rob Renzetti	July 26, 1998
In a fairy-tale parody of The X-Files, Fauna Fox and Chic Little attempt to protect The Three Little Pigs from the Big Bad Wolf.
2b	"25-Cent Trouble / Teddy & Art"	Alex Kirwan	July 26, 1998
Little Teddy and his panting dog Art decide to spend twenty five cents on an action robot in a supermarket vending machine. Teddy and Art end up chasing the robot from mess to mess as the robot grows bigger and bigger by the minute.
2c	"Cat and Milkman"	Miles Thompson	July 26, 1998
A thirsty cat tries to steal milk from a milkman, who won't let the cat interrupt his deliveries. Coming Attraction: Jamal the Funny Frog: Mind the Baby, Jamal
3a	"Jamal the Funny Frog: Mind the Baby, Jamal"	Pat Ventura	August 2, 1998
Jamal the Frog is responsible for watching his sister Polly.
3b	"Thatta Boy"	Alex Kirwan	August 2, 1998
Cyborg kid hero Thatta Boy and his sidekick Zio team up with his girlfriend Polly to fight evil.
3c	"Hobart: The Weedkeeper"	Bill Burnett and Greg Emison	August 2, 1998
Hobart goes to extremes to impress his girlfriend Okra by buying her a puppy to replace the toaster that she walks. After chasing the escaped puppy into the septic system, Hobart comes across a crazy gremlin, a gigantic hungry tree frog, and a large mosquito. Coming Attraction: Pete Patrick, P.I.: What About Lunch?
4a	"Protecto-5000"	John Eng	August 9, 1998
Kenny, an intergalactic Protecto-5000 robot bodyguard who has been on Earth for hundreds of millions of years, takes up the position of a school janitor. He soon befriends a new student named Nadya, and protects her from the hassles that come with transferring to a new school.
4b	"Ask Edward: All About Babies"	Rob Renzetti	August 9, 1998
Dog brothers Edward and Emo, after hearing their parents consider having another child, state their own ideas about the mystery of where babies come from.
4c	"Pete Patrick, P.I.: What About Lunch?"	Vincent Waller	August 9, 1998
Kid detective Peter Patrick and talking cat sidekick Persian Puss attempt to solve the mystery of a missing dog. Coming Attraction: Max's Special Problem
5a	"Max and His Special Problem"	Dave Wasson and Chris Miller	August 16, 1998
Max, a not-so-efficient worker in a very efficient office, sneezes hard enough that his brain ejects from his head. Max then goes through a series of gags to try and reinsert his brain.
5b	"Tutu the Superina"	Bill Burnett and Sally Rousse	August 16, 1998
Tutu, a superhero ballerina, tries to stop a pair of criminals who kidnap, sell, and torment animals.
5c	"Blotto"	Byron Vaughns	August 16, 1998
In a short told through song, a drop of ink creates Blotto, who sings about the ink world he lives in and hopes to win the charms of the grouchy Dotto. Dotto is soon won over by the Balloon Goon, the villain of a comic book next to the paper she and Blotto are drawn on, and Blotto tries to free his sister from the Goon's clutches. Coming Attraction: Olly & Frank
6a	"Tales from the Goose Lady: Jack and the Beatstalk"	Dave Wasson	August 23, 1998
The Goose Lady bothers siblings Dot and Randy as her talking wand Juanito tells a version of Jack and the Beanstalk, wherein Jack is a beatnik who hopes to acquire a giant's magic coffee machine.
6b	"Twins Crimson and Those Amazing Robots"	Carlos Ramos	August 23, 1998
Rambunctious twins Bene and Beck Crimson are forced to go out and play by their mother. They suddenly discover a jungle in their backyard that is being torn down to make way for a futuristic city called Metroplex. The twins then come face to face with powerful robots, and they work together with the jungle's animals to fight back against them.
6c	"Olly and Frank"	Bob Boyle	August 23, 1998
Child prodigy Olly regularly has his love interest Daisy May stolen from him by the beefy bully Bratwurst. Hoping to get revenge on Bratwurst, Olly creates Frank, a monster with the brain and body of a dog. Olly soon finds out that training his creation is no easy task. Coming Attraction: A Cop & His Donut
7a	"APEX Cartoon Props & Novelties"	Larry Huber	August 30, 1998
A pair of cartoon villains sneak into the APEX factory, where all the great cartoon devices are made. They also, unfortunately, experience them all first hand.
7b	"A Cop and His Donut"	Rob Renzetti	August 30, 1998
A rookie cop investigates a bank robbery where his veteran partner is injured. He then ends up meeting his partner's partner: a living, talking donut. The donut and the rookie are then forced to work together to capture the bank robbers.
7c	"Enchanted Adventures"	John Eng and Bill Burnett	August 30, 1998
A knight with a transforming sword must match wits with an evil sorcerer to save his village from a plague. Coming Attraction: Super Santa: Jingle Bell Justice Note: It was originally titled "Galen and Kalibron" (Prod. Code: YEA-601).
8a	"The Fairly OddParents!"	Butch Hartman	September 6, 1998
A ten-year-old boy named Timmy Turner ends up receiving two wish granting fairy godparents named Cosmo and Wanda, and he uses them to help him get even with his bossy babysitter, Vicky.
8b	"Hobart: Deep Sea Diva"	Bill Burnett and Greg Emison	September 6, 1998
Hobart and Okra learn about the topsy-turvy life of Hobart's pet goldfish.
8c	"Super Santa: Jingle Bell Justice"	Mike Bell	September 6, 1998
The villainous Bedlam Bunny, angered at being made into something cute instead of cool, invents a ray gun that turns toys evil. It's up to Santa Claus and his wife Emma, revealed to be superheroes, to stop the bunny before his toy army overruns the city. Coming Attraction: That's My Pop: There's A Dinosaur In The House
9a	"Kitty the Hapless Cat"	Zac Moncrief	September 13, 1998
A talking cat named Kitty recounts the many, many times he's been adopted into a home, only to end up having it go horribly wrong.
9b	"That's My Pop: There's A Dinosaur In The House"	Pat Ventura	September 13, 1998
Genius Naomi tries to keep her father from finding out that a dinosaur is in the house.
9c	"Hubbykins & Sweetie Pie"	Rob Renzetti	September 13, 1998
In a silent short, Sweetie Pie grows frustrated at the antics of her careless and slovenly husband Hubbykins. When Hubby tries to get out of doing his share of the chores and go bowling, his wife snaps and chases him around the house to teach him a lesson. Coming Attraction: Hey Look!
10a	"The Man with No Nose"	Larry Huber	September 20, 1998
Urp is an alien stranded on Earth, and has spent the last 8 years being showcased as "The Man with No Nose" in a circus sideshow. He soon meets a young boy in the circus that offers to help him find a way to power his ship and return to his planet.
10b	"Youngstar3"	Miles Thompson	September 20, 1998
The Youngstar-3, consisting of Youngstar, his grandpa Old Man, and super-powered robot Shero, attempt to fight a giant fish monster that emerges from the depths of the ocean.
10c	"Hey Look!"	Harvey Kurtzman (adapted by Vincent Waller)	September 20, 1998
Two guys go on a job hunt with no experience and get into one mess after another. Coming Attraction: ChalkZone: The Amazin' River
11a	"ChalkZone: The Amazin' River"	Bill Burnett and Larry Huber	September 27, 1998
Rudy and Snap travel down a river to a mine filled with magic chalk.
11b	"Tales from the Goose Lady: Hamzel and Grandé"	Dave Wasson	September 27, 1998
The Goose Lady and Juanito return, keeping Dot and Randy awake all night by telling them a version of Hansel and Gretel, who are depicted as overweight gluttons who keep eating the innocent witch's gingerbread house.
11c	"The Feelers"	Bill Burnett	September 27, 1998
The Feelers, an all-insect rock band, are tired of performing on the streets and living in obscurity. The band's singer, Mitzi Moth, believes that getting their music to humans' ears will solve their problems, so she has the band sneak into a recording studio to hopefully have their music played on the radio. Coming Attraction: Max and the Pigeon Incident
12a	"Max and the Pigeon Incident"	Dave Wasson	October 18, 1998
After being told not to leave his office, Max goes on an adventure to chase after the pigeon who steals his pencil.
12b	"Zoomates!"	Seth MacFarlane and Butch Hartman	October 18, 1998
In this canned laughter-heavy cartoon, an animal rights activist named Helen orders the head of the local zoo to free the zoo's animals. To prove her beliefs have merit, she has three of the zoo's animals, Mark the Polar Bear, Paul the Alligator, and Warren the Ostrich, move into an apartment in the hopes that the trio can adapt to human life.
12c	"Microcops"	John Eng	October 18, 1998
Officer Jones is the microscopic product of an anti-flu capsule ingested by a sick man. When the other antibodies are captured by the flu bug making the man sick, Jones must seek out the bug and exterminate it himself. Coming Attraction: Planet Kate
13a	"Planet Kate"	Jamie Mitchell	October 11, 1998
A young girl named Kate Moon meets a quintet of extraterrestrial dogs, and ends up joining them in their search for an ancient city where their people used to live.
13b	"Fathead"	Vince Calandra	October 11, 1998
In order to pass a test of manhood, an intelligent caveboy named Fathead must steal the egg of a Tyrannosaurus rex.

=== Season 2 (1999) ===
Hosted by Kenan Thompson.

No.	Title	Created by	Original release date
1a	"ChalkZone: Rudy's Date"	Bill Burnett and Larry Huber	September 18, 1999
Snap, Rudy and his friend Penny try to gather parts to an erased formula.
1b	"Fuzzy Bunny Presents: A Kid's Life"	Ken Kessel	September 18, 1999
1c	"The Fairly OddParents: Too Many Timmys!"	Butch Hartman	September 18, 1999
Having been left alone with a demanding, "injured" Vicky babysitting him and using him as a servant, Timmy wishes up a bunch of clones to do his chores for him. However, when they scare Vicky out of her mind and chaos ensues, Timmy must wish them away.
2a	"The Fairly OddParents: Where's the Wand?"	Butch Hartman	September 18, 1999
While Timmy, Cosmo, and Wanda are playing games, Wanda's wand accidentally ends up with Vicky, who uses Wanda's wand as a prop for her fairy costume at her High School costume party, and Timmy must get back the wand since it is granting Vicky's wishes.
2b	"Magic Trixie"	Alex Kirwan	September 18, 1999
A young girl tries a magic trick with no success, but at a magic show, she outshines the magician.
2c	"Tales from the Goose Lady: The Egg Who Would Be King"	Dave Wasson	September 18, 1999
While making them missing out on their science exam, The Goose and Juanito tell Dot and Randy the story of a chicken laying a popular Humpty Dumpty instead of a golden egg.
3a	"Tales from the Goose Lady: The Little Pigs 3"	Dave Wasson	September 25, 1999
3b	"Freddy Seymore's Amazing Life"	Tim Biskup	September 25, 1999
3c	"Jamal the Funny Frog: His Musical Moment"	Pat Ventura	September 25, 1999
4a	"ChalkZone: Snap Out of Water"	Bill Burnett and Larry Huber	October 2, 1999
Snap accidentally travels outside of ChalkZone and into Rudy's classroom.
4b	"Earth to Obie"	Guy Vasilovich	October 2, 1999
Lacking attention from his parents, ten year old Obie fantasizes. In this story, Obie confronts his cereal addiction when he accompanies his mom on a trip to the grocery store.
4c	"Mina & The Count: The Ghoul's Tribunal"	Rob Renzetti	October 2, 1999
Vlad the Vampire Count is brought to court when it's found out that he's friends with a human girl named Mina.
5a	"ChalkZone: Secret Passages"	Bill Burnett and Larry Huber	October 9, 1999
Snap helps Rudy and Penny find a ChalkZone portal that leads to their school in order to retrieve the class hamster.
5b	"The Kid from S.C.H.O.O.L."	Bill Riling and Bob Boyle	October 9, 1999
Jake Slade, the top agent at Benedict Arnold High School, must stop the nefarious plot of Simon Cerebellum to become Prom King with his wide array of gadgets.
5c	"Mina & The Count: The Vampire Who Came to Dinner"	Rob Renzetti	October 9, 1999
Mina invites The Count to have dinner with her family.
6a	"The Fairly OddParents: Party of 3"	Butch Hartman	October 16, 1999
Vicky tries to get proof of Timmy having a party at his house while Mr. and Mrs. Turner are out, but fails miserably.
6b	"The Forgotten Toybox: The Curse of the Werebaby"	Mike Bell	October 16, 1999
In a parody of The Twilight Zone, the short's host, Mr. Beasley (a doll whose dialogue begins after pulling his string) anthologizes a tale of a cursed baby doll that transforms a selfish adult man named Stanley Grunt, who still acts like a baby, into a werebaby (an adult sized baby) as punishment for not acting his age.
6c	"Jelly's Day: Uncle Betty's Strange Rash"	Greg Emison and Bill Burnett	October 16, 1999
Uncle Betty comes to visit in the museum of stuff from outer space where Jelly visit, but he gets a strange rash.
7a	"ChalkZone: ChalkDad"	Bill Burnett and Larry Huber	October 23, 1999
Rudy gets creative on his dad's specials board, but his dad hates Rudy's drawings and ideas. Feeling rejected, Rudy escapes to ChalkZone. There he runs into his ChalkDad, who turns out to be just as fussy, ordering Rudy to help him by drawing his restaurant. Despite the fact that his ChalkDad hates the design, the restaurant turns out to be the hottest business in ChalkZone. After returning from ChalkZone, Rudy and his dad reconcile after his dad told him his drawings and ideas were actually brilliant and apologizes to him for being grouchy.
7b	"A Dog & His Boy"	Carlos Ramos	October 23, 1999
7c	"Mina & the Count: Playing a Hunch"	Rob Renzetti	October 23, 1999
The Count tries to hide Mina from his servant Igor.
8a	"The Fairly OddParents: The Fairy Flu"	Butch Hartman	October 30, 1999
Cosmo and Wanda have caught the fairy flu and whenever they sneeze, their magic effects everything around them. This is problem trouble for Timmy, who has been invited to a birthday party for Tootie, Vicky's younger sister. Tootie, unlike her sister, is madly in love with Timmy, worsening the situation.
8b	"Lollygaggin'"	Guy Vasilovich	October 30, 1999
Lolly discovers that her little lies have been growing in her closet and are out to haunt her.
8c	"Tales from the Goose Lady: The Tortoise and the Hairpiece"	Dave Wasson	October 30, 1999
9a	"ChalkZone: Chalk Rain"	Bill Burnett and Larry Huber	November 6, 1999
A Chinese dragon causes havoc in ChalkZone.
9b	"The Dan Danger Show"	Butch Hartman	November 6, 1999
On TV, he is brave jungle explorer Dan Danger; in real life, however, he is extremely meek and frightened of just about everything. Dan's fear of flying gets the better of him when he is sent to take a trip via airplane.
9c	"Mina & The Count: My Best Friend"	Rob Renzetti	November 6, 1999
After a bully mocks Mina after telling her class about her vampire friend, Vlad tries to teach Mina how to scare him.
10a	"The Fairly OddParents: The Temp"	Butch Hartman	November 13, 1999
Cosmo and Wanda must go to the Fairy Academy to have their Godparenting License renewed, and their drill instructor is the toughest fairy in the universe, Jorgen Von Strangle. While they are absent, Timmy gets a substitute godparent, Jeff, who can only make toys; it turns out that Jeff is a runaway elf from the North Pole.
10b	"Herb"	Antoine Guilbaud	November 13, 1999
A monster in a diaper provides a five-star meal to the entire school and wins the students' favor.
10c	"Jamal the Funny Frog: Milk Dreams"	Pat Ventura	November 13, 1999
Polly is overcome with a thirst for milk while Jamal enters her dreams to save her.
11a	"The Fairly OddParents: The Zappys"	Butch Hartman	November 20, 1999
Timmy, Cosmo, and Wanda are nominated for a Fairy World award show, but Jorgen Von Strangle, the toughest fairy in the universe, uses his power to "persuade" the judges; in a subplot, Timmy's left buck tooth is loose.
11b	"Let's Talk Turkey"	Vincent Waller	November 20, 1999
Thom Turkey he sells his way out of a hot pot by peddling processed "Phlab" meat.
11c	"Tales from the Goose Lady: Three Bears and a Blonde"	Dave Wasson	November 20, 1999
Dot and Randy are off to the Natural History Museum for a field trip, but The Goose and Juanito are at it again with a story of Goldilocks and the 3 bears where the father plans horribly to eat Goldilocks.
12a	"ChalkZone: Rapunzel"	Bill Burnett and Larry Huber	December 4, 1999
Rudy, Penny, and Snap watch a stage production of Rapunzel starring Queen Rapsheeba.
12b	"Zoey's Zoo: Lots of Ocelots"	Amy Ellyn Anderson and David Burd	December 4, 1999
An animal loving girl named Zoey tries to adopt some Ocelots but ends up getting too many.
12c	"My Neighbor Was a Teenage Robot"	Rob Renzetti	December 4, 1999
After accidentally throwing the baseball into the window of a house next door, Brad Carbunkle sends his brother, Tuck to retrieve the ball, but he meets a robot girl named XJ-9 (she calls herself "Jenny") who gives him the baseball, scaring the pants off of him. Then, he tells his brother there's a robot inside, but he doesn't believe him. Jenny belongs to a scientist named Dr. Nora Wakeman, who wants her to save the world, but she meets Brad, sneaks out, and then hangs out, but Tuck is still afraid of her.
13a	"Jelly's Day: Auntie Broth's Makeover"	Greg Emison and Bill Burnett	December 18, 1999
Jelly takes her Aunt Broth to the mall for a makeover. The only problem is no one can touch her because she laughs hysterically and people have to run for cover. So, Jelly decides to perform open brain surgery right in the salon.
13b	"Terry & Chris"	John Reynolds	December 18, 1999
Problems are caused when a boy brings in a parrot with him.
13c	"Mina & The Count: Frankenfrog"	Rob Renzetti	December 18, 1999
Mina brings a school's dissection frog back to life.

=== Season 3 (2002) ===
Hosted by Josh Server.

No.	Title	Created by	Original release date
1a	"The Fairly OddParents: Super Humor"	Butch Hartman	June 6, 2002 (Nicktoons TV)
Timmy, wanting to be a superhero, tries out superpowers.
1b	"The Boy Who Cried Alien"	Guy Vasilovich	June 6, 2002 (Nicktoons TV); August 30, 2002 (Nickelodeon)
1c	"Jamal, the Funny Frog: Dentist"	Pat Ventura	June 6, 2002 (Nicktoons TV)
2a	"Super Santa: South Pole Joe"	Mike Bell	March 30, 2002
2b	"Sick and Tired: Bug Bite"	Andre Nieves and Ric Delcarmen	March 30, 2002
Two roommates and plumbers named Sick and Tired have to retrieve a ring from their neighbor's sink, but an annoying mosquito makes the task difficult for them.
2c	"Tales from the Goose Lady: The Ugly Duck-Thing"	Dave Wasson	March 30, 2002
3a	"The Fairly OddParents: Scout's Honor"	Butch Hartman	April 6, 2002
Cosmo and Wanda try to help Timmy capture Bigfoot to earn his Squirrel Scout badge in capturing a mythical creature.
3b	"Skippy Spankerton: Hot Tamale Monster Movie Madness"	Eric Bryan and Michelle Bryan	April 6, 2002
3c	"Jamal, the Funny Frog: Beach"	Pat Ventura	April 6, 2002
4a	"Super Santa: Vegetation"	Mike Bell	April 13, 2002
4b	"Elise: Mere Mortal"	Guy Vasilovich	April 13, 2002
4c	"A Kid's Life: Picture Perfect"	Ken Kessel	April 13, 2002
5a	"The Fairly OddParents: The Really Bad Day!"	Butch Hartman	June 9, 2002 (Nicktoons TV)
For one day in a certain number of years, a fairy godparent has to be "bad," and it is Cosmo's turn to do so. However, Cosmo fails constantly at being "bad." Timmy and Wanda try to help him, enlisting help from conqueror Genghis Khan to teach him how to be bad, but soon, Cosmo plans to blow up the Earth.
5b	"Baxter & Bananas"	Zac Moncrief	June 9, 2002 (Nicktoons TV); July 12, 2002 (Nickelodeon)
5c	"Tales from the Goose Lady: The Fisherman, the Fisherman's Wife, and a Fish"	Dave Wasson	June 9, 2002 (Nicktoons TV); August 2, 2002 (Nickelodeon)
6a	"Dan Danger: Danger 101"	Butch Hartman and Steve Marmel	March 23, 2002
6b	"The Tantrum"	John Fountain	March 23, 2002
6c	"Super Santa: Naughty"	Mike Bell	March 23, 2002
7a	"Dan Danger: A Lighter Shade of Danger"	Butch Hartman and Steve Marmel	June 10, 2002 (Nicktoons TV); July 19, 2002 (Nickelodeon)
7b	"The Kameleon Kid"	Jamie Diaz and Russ Mooney	June 10, 2002 (Nicktoons TV); July 26, 2002 (Nickelodeon)
7c	"Jamal the Funny Frog: Camping"	Pat Ventura	June 10, 2002 (Nicktoons TV); August 16, 2002 (Nickelodeon)
8a	"Dan Danger: A Date with Danger"	Butch Hartman and Steve Marmel	June 10, 2002 (Nicktoons TV); August 23, 2002 (Nickelodeon)
8b	"The Semprini Triplets"	Pat Ventura	June 10, 2002 (Nicktoons TV); August 9, 2002 (Nickelodeon)
8c	"Tales from the Goose Lady: Dot & Randy's Sad Tale of Woe"	Dave Wasson	June 10, 2002 (Nicktoons TV)
