= The Amagi =

American YouTuber

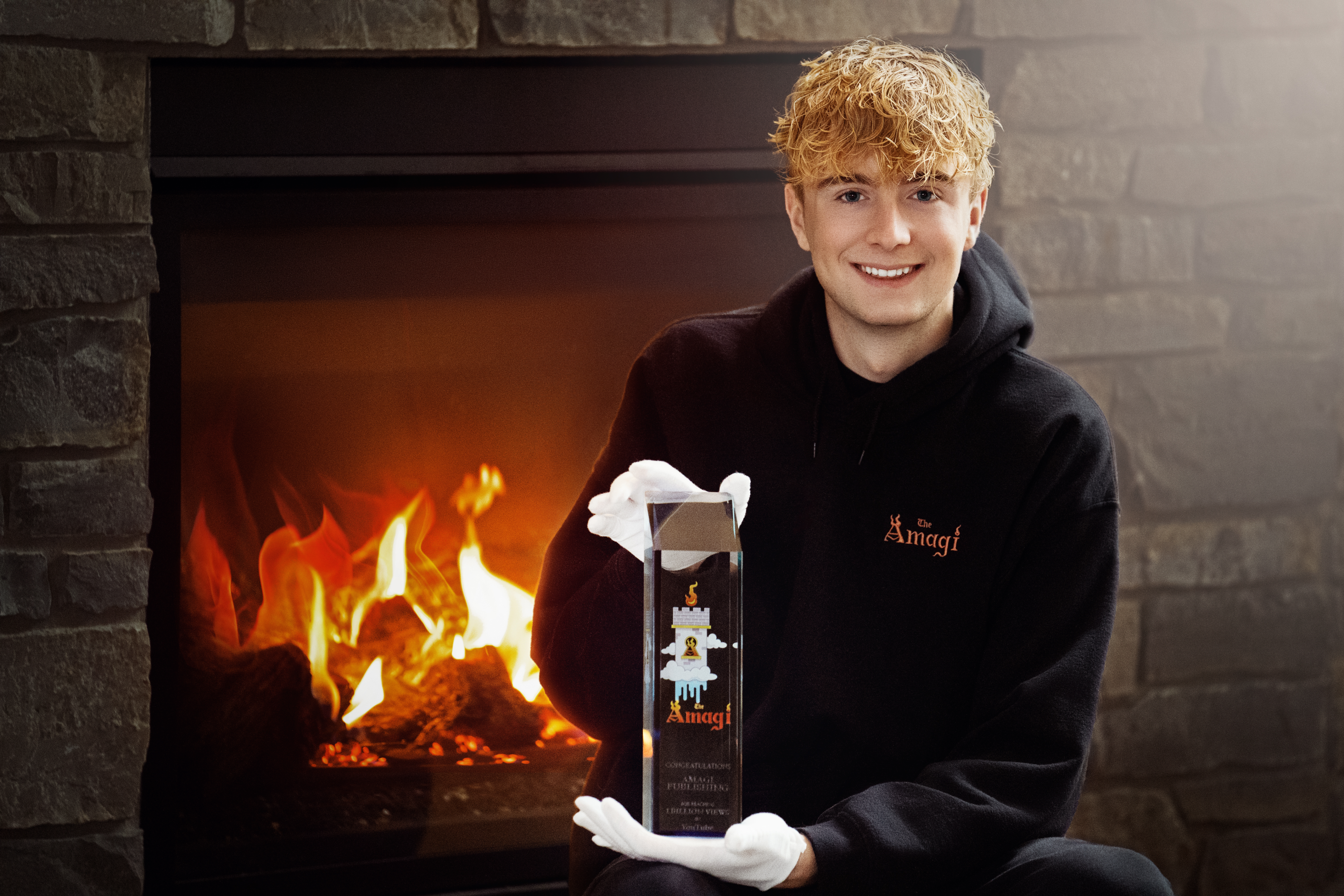
- Born: Ethan McGregor Schulteis; Hartford, Wisconsin, U.S.
- Occupation: YouTuber
- Years active: 2016–present

YouTube information
- Channels: The Amagi; ChannelFrederator; The Leaderboard; Stan Lee Presents; The Amagi Hindi
- Subscribers: 6 million (combined) (Note: Subscribers, broken down by channel: 2.07 million (The Amagi) 2.17 million (ChannelFrederator) 1.5 million (The Leaderboard) 318 thousand (Stan Lee Presents) 300 thousand (The Amagi Hindi))
- Views: 1796 million (combined) (Note: Views, broken down by channel: 569 million (The Amagi) 664 million (ChannelFrederator) 418 million (The Leaderboard) 85 million (Stan Lee Presents) 60 million (The Amagi Hindi))
- Last updated: November 16, 2024
- Website: www.amagipublishing.com

Ethan McGregor Schulteis (born August 25, 2002), known professionally as The Amagi, is an American YouTuber and entrepreneur from Wisconsin, USA. He is known for creating anime and manga-related content on YouTube. He has gained popularity for his character studies, origin stories, and discussions of various fictional abilities and societies. His work often includes analyses of popular series such as Avatar: The Last Airbender and Naruto.

Schulteis is also responsible for managing the YouTube Channels ChannelFrederator, Stan Lee Presents, and The Leaderboard. Collectively, these channels have over 6 million followers. The Amagi's channel contents are also translated into the Hindi language and posted on The Amagi Hindi channel.

== Background ==
Schulteis, was born on August 25, 2002, in Wisconsin. He attended Slinger High School, where he graduated in 2021.

== Career ==
Schulteis developed an early interest for animation, kindled by the series Avatar: The Last Airbender. At the age of 14, he created an animated show titled The Amagi, which he proposed to Nickelodeon; however, the pitch was not accepted. Subsequently, Schulteis launched a YouTube channel under the same name, which was inspired by the antagonist in his animated project.

The channel experienced a surge in popularity following the increased viewership of Avatar: The Last Airbender on Netflix in 2019. A video discussing Lavabending, a concept from the Avatar series, accumulated over one million views. During the COVID-19 pandemic, Schulteis took advantage of the heightened demand for online content, broadening his channel's scope to include a variety of anime series, which led to a substantial growth in viewership. To enhance the channel's quality, he employed a voice actor and video editor, reaching 100,000 subscribers by June 2020 and expanding to 500,000 by January 2021, partly due to content focused on the Naruto series.

By August 2021, The Amagi channel exceeded one million subscribers. As of 2024 The Amagi has more than 2 million subscribers.

=== Expansion ===
In 2022, Schulteis and his team were tasked by Channel Frederator to manage its official YouTube channel. Subsequently, he was also asked to take charge of Frederator’s live-action channel, Cinematica which has over 300,000 subscribers and 75 million views.

In 2023, Schulteis also began managing The Leaderboard, a YouTube channel with over 1.5 million subscribers, thus extending The Amagi's overall reach to more than 6 million subscribers across multiple channels. Schulteis further expanded The Amagi's reach by translating his channel's content into Hindi, leading to the creation of The Amagi Hindi channel. In April 2024, Frederator Media collaborated with Kartoon Studios to rebrand Cinematica, which is managed by Schulteis, as Stan Lee Presents. The channel now focuses on the legacy of Stan Lee, featuring content from his personal archives, digital comic books, interviews, behind-the-scenes footage, and previews of upcoming projects.
