= YouTube Next Lab and Audience Development Group =

Company based in New York City

- Formerly: Next New Networks (2007–2011)
- Founded: March 2007
- Founder: Fred Seibert; Emil Rensing; Herb Scannell; Timothy Shey; Jed Simmons
- Headquarters: New York, NY, United States
- Owner: YouTube (2011–present)
- Parent: Google LLC
- Website: www.youtube.com/nextnew

The YouTube Next Lab and Audience Development Group, founded as Next New Networks, is a company based in New York City. Next New was launched in March 2007 by founders Fred Seibert & Emil Rensing, and co-founders Herb Scannell, Timothy Shey and Jed Simmons with $8 million in funding from investors including Spark Capital. The company was the home to online television networks Barely Political, Channel Frederator, Fast Lane Daily, Pulp Secret, Threadbanger, Vsauce, and Indy Mogul, among others. Next New Network's first creative hire was filmmaker Justin Johnson.

In November 2010, the company was selected to create and launch an original daily series for AOL's homepage, "The One", as part of AOL's new video strategy.

The Next New Networks approach to programming web video brands and channels (as opposed to merely producing them) led to the creation of online video networks (called multi-channel networks, MCN's), and have inspired a number of followers including Machinima.com in Los Angeles and ChannelFlip in the United Kingdom. YouTube acquired the company on March 7, 2011, immediately adding this expertise to the platform giant. Tim Shey, Jed Simmons, and Lance Podell from the NNN management team have started the YouTube Next Lab. Founder and CEO Fred Seibert resumed as an independent producer at his Frederator Studios company and was named as a new YouTube channel partner in November 2011.

== See also ==
- List of Web television series
- Web series
- Content delivery network
- Web television
