= Too Cool! Cartoons =

- Created by: Fred Seibert
- Starring: Various voice actors
- Countries of origin: Various, primarily United States
- Original language: English
- No. of episodes: 11

Production
- Executive producer: Fred Seibert
- Producers: Kevin Kolde and Eric Homan
- Production company: Frederator Studios

Original release
- Network: Cartoon Hangover
- Release: April 4, 2013 – August 28, 2014

Related
- What a Cartoon!; Oh Yeah! Cartoons; The Meth Minute 39; Random! Cartoons; Bee and PuppyCat; Dead End: Paranormal Park

Too Cool! Cartoons is an adult animated web series on the YouTube channel Cartoon Hangover. It was created by Fred Seibert and produced by Frederator Studios. The series premiered on April 4, 2013, with the short Our New Electrical Morals. It was planned to feature 39 shorts but ended up releasing only 11 shorts.

Too Cool! Cartoons was Frederator's fifth cartoon "incubator" series over the past 21 years, featuring unique voices in short animated films, meant to introduce original characters and animation creators. The other series include What A Cartoon! (1995, with Hanna-Barbera and Cartoon Network), Oh Yeah! Cartoons (1998, with Nickelodeon), The Meth Minute 39 (2008, with Channel Frederator), and Random! Cartoons (2008, with Nickelodeon).

The series was available to view on VRV until Cartoon Hangover Select was removed from the site in December 2021.

== Description ==
Too Cool! Cartoons showcases animated shorts. The series is Frederator's fifth cartoon incubator, in which animators have their work shown on Frederator's YouTube channel Cartoon Hangover.

Too Cool! Cartoons has been a multi-national effort, with creators and artists in England, Australia, Greece, South Korea, Scotland, Japan, Canada, Sweden, and the United States.

== List of episodes ==
| Episode | Title | Creator | Director | Air Date | Cast |
|---|---|---|---|---|---|
| 101 | Our New Electrical Morals | Mike Rosenthal | Kenny Pittenger | April 4, 2013 | Fred Tatasciore, Johnny Hawkes, Audrey Wasilewski, Kari Wahlgren |
| 102 | Rocket Dog | Mel Roach | Mel Roach | May 2, 2013 | Mel Roach, Josh Lawson, Steven Blum, Kari Wahlgren |
| 103 | Ace Discovery | Tom Gran & Martin Woolley | Tom Gran & Martin Woolley | May 30, 2013 | Ako Mitchell, Hugo Harold-Harrison, Eric Meyers, Doireann Ní Chorragáin, Martin Woolley |
| 104 | Bee and PuppyCat: Part 1 | Natasha Allegri | Larry Leichliter | July 11, 2013 | Allyn Rachel, Kent Osborne, Tom Kenny |
| 105 | Bee and PuppyCat: Part 2 | Natasha Allegri | Larry Leichliter | August 9, 2013 | Allyn Rachel, Frank Gibson, Marina Sirtis |
| 106 | Doctor Lollipop | Miss Kelly Martin | Aliki Grafft | September 12, 2013 | Chris Diamantopoulos, Dee Baker, Rose McGowan, Jason Marsden, Travis Willingham |
| 107 | Dead End | Hamish Steele | Mel Roach | June 26, 2014 | Zack Pearlman, Cameron Goodman, Stefan Marks, Maria Bamford |
| 108 | Chainsaw Richard | Christopher Reineman | Tom King | July 17, 2014 | Tyler Merna, Ashly Burch, Eric Bauza, River Jordan |
| 109 | Manly | Jesse Moynihan & Justin Moynihan | Jesse Moynihan & Justin Moynihan | July 31, 2014 | Jill Bartlett, Joey Richter, Steve Agee, Roger Craig Smith |
| 110 | SpaceBear | Andy Helms | Dave Ferguson | August 14, 2014 | Rodger Bumpass, Christopher Curry, Ogie Banks, Josh Keaton |
| 111 | Blackford Manor | Jiwook Kim | Jiwook Kim | August 28, 2014 | Ashly Burch, Martin Rayner, Billy West |

== Reception ==
Laura Beck of Jezebel called Bee and PuppyCat "adorable and hilarious," and Meredith Woemer of io9 wrote, "This might be the first cartoon webseries we didn't want to end." The two-part short led to a Kickstarter campaign to raise funds for a full season; the campaign was successfully funded, raising $872,133 in November 2013 to go toward producing nine original new episodes of the series.

Robert Lloyd of the Los Angeles Times wrote that Manly was "psychedelic and melancholy," and Susana Polo of The Mary Sue called the short "weird and awesome."

== Filmography ==
Fred Seibert cartoon shorts filmography
