= Genius Products =

Defunct entertainment company

Genius Products, Inc.
- Genius Products logo used from 2007 until 2011.
- Formerly: International Trading and Manufacturing Corporation (1996-2000)
- Type: Public
- Traded as: Expert Market: GNPR
- Industry: Entertainment
- Founded: 1996; 30 years ago in San Diego, California, U.S.
- Founders: Klaus Moeller; Larry Balaban
- Defunct: 2011; 15 years ago
- Fate: Bankruptcy and Liquidation
- Successor: Kartoon Studios
- Headquarters: Santa Monica, California, U.S.
- Key people: Trevor Drinkwater (CEO)
- Products: Motion pictures, television programs

Genius Products (formerly known as Genius Entertainment) was a home entertainment company based in Santa Monica, California, United States.

The Baby Genius line was one of a number of "smart toys" that came out in response to a study book about the Mozart effect.

Genius also released DVDs for other companies, including Entertainment Rights, Classic Media, Sesame Workshop (from 2007 to 2009), ESPN, Discovery Communications, World Wrestling Entertainment, and PorchLight Entertainment.

== History ==
Genius Products Inc. was founded in San Diego, California in 1999. created by Klaus Moeller and Larry Balaban. In 2001, the video release of Baby Genius: The Four Seasons won a Kids First! award, beating Teletubbies. By 2002, AOL Time Warner was distributing Baby Genius products.

Genius Products acquired American Vantage Media (formerly Fox Lorber, Winstar TV & Video, and Wellspring Media, spun off from Winstar Communications in 2001) in early 2005. On December 5, 2005, Genius Products, Inc. announced a distribution joint venture with The Weinstein Company (TWC) called Genius Products, LLC (GPL), with Weinstein holding a 70% stake. GPL would hold the Wellspring film library, including the Fox Lorber, Winstar and American Vantage Media titles, and the bulk of GPI's assets. Weinstein Co. added distribution rights for its products combined with no cash and received a 50% cut in the distribution fee on their films. The high-profile with Weinstein helped Genius Products to open the doors to major retailers like Wal-Mart and Target. With major retailers available to Genius, other entertainment companies including ESPN and Robert Halmi Inc. had signed with them. Under Weinstein's order, the Wellspring Home Entertainment division was moved to Santa Monica, California at the end of April, dropping most of the previous staff and closing its theatrical distribution unit, while transferring theatrical distribution to TWC. TWC also arranged for direct-to-video funding from Blockbuster in exchange for exclusive rental rights. Expecting the indistinguishable dozen films to be made (possibly by a standing Romanian-based crew) under the multi-year deal would generate regular income of $1 to $2 million.

In January 2006, Pacific Entertainment, formed by Moeller and Balaban, purchased Baby Genius and other lines from Genius Products, Inc. for $3 million. The other lines were preschool brands such as Wee Worship and the Little Tikes music and DVD series. Genius Products retained exclusive U.S. distribution rights for the lines.

In April 2006, Genius Products signed a distribution agreement with Tartan USA, an American division of the British company Tartan Films to distribute its titles on DVD, taking over from TLA Releasing.

In July 2006, Genius Products signed an agreement with ESPN Inc. to distribute DVDs of ESPN programs via the ESPN Home Entertainment label.

In October 2006, Genius Products signed distribution agreements with Discovery Kids and World Wrestling Entertainment to distribute their titles on DVD.

On December 10, 2006, Genius Products signed a distribution agreement with RHI Entertainment (now known as Sonar Entertainment) to distribute its miniseries and television films on DVD.

In January and February 2007, Genius Products and The Weinstein Co. signed distribution and co-production agreements with Entertainment Rights, Classic Media and Sesame Workshop after Sesame Workshop and Classic Media's deals with Sony Wonder ended. Genius would distribute Sesame Workshop and ER/Classic Media's shows, while Weinstein Co. would work with Sesame and ER/Classic Media on current properties and for future development. At this time, Steve Bannon was the chairman of the board at Genius.

In 2009, investment firm Quadrant Management affiliate, GNPR Investments, acquired 60% of Genius Products, LLC, with TWC retaining 15% and Genius Products, Inc. holding 25%. Later that year, Genius' home video distribution rights were acquired by Vivendi Entertainment, while distribution rights to Sesame Workshop were sold to Warner Home Video.

In 2011, GPL was pushed into involuntary bankruptcy over $8.5 million in debt by World Wrestling Entertainment and two other companies.

== Distribution rights ==
- BKN International AG
- Classic Media/Entertainment Rights (2007-2009, NA)
- Discovery Communications (2006-2009)
- BFC Berliner Film Companie Distribution
- ESPN Home Entertainment
- Robert Halmi Inc.
- Pacific Entertainment (2006-2009)
- NBC News
- PorchLight Entertainment
- Rainbow Media
- RHI Entertainment (2006-2009, US)
- Sesame Workshop (2007-2009, US)
- The Weinstein Company Home Entertainment (2006-2009, NA)
- World Wrestling Entertainment (2006-2009, US)
