= Stan Lee's Mighty 7 =

Superhero team franchise by Stan Lee

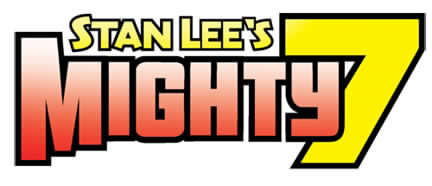
- Created by: Stan Lee
- Original work: Comic books

Print publications
- Comics: Stan Lee's Mighty 7 #1-3

Films and television
- Television film(s): Stan Lee’s Mighty 7: Beginnings

Stan Lee's Mighty 7 (SLAM 7) is a media franchise of a superhero team originally published as a Stan Lee Comics line comic book title.

== History ==
Stan Lee's Secret Super Six property of Stan Lee's POW! Entertainment was signed with Andy Heyward's DIC Entertainment on a TV series production deal in July 2003. The property is about alien super powered teens taught by Lee about humanity.

In February 2010, POW! partnered with Andy Heyward's A Squared Entertainment (now a part of Genius Brands International) and Archie Comics to create the Stan Lee Comics print and digital line starting with the retitled Stan Lee's Super Seven. In August, Super7, a toy manufacturer, sued POW! and partners over Stan Lee Comics' Super Seven. In March 2012, the first issue of the renamed "Stan Lee's Mighty 7" six issue miniseries was published. Also in 2012, A^{2} took over Archies' ownership stake in Stan Lee Comics.

In March 2013, Hub Network picked up its first work from POW, Stan Lee's Mighty 7, animated pilot movie to be aired in early 2014. By January 2014, Stan Lee Comics had the second film in production for a late 2014 release while an animated TV series was in development and expected to premier in 2015 along with the final film early that year.

The first batch of licensing deals were made in February 2014 by Genius Brands on Stan Lee Comics behalf. Black Lantern agreed to develop a video game. While Factory Entertainment has the worldwide toy license and Zak Designs has the mealtime & on-the-go products for Canada and the United States. Clothing licensees included Fame Jeans, Greensource, Adtn International, and JCorp with a targeted spring product launches.

Two more films and a TV series were planned to air on Hub Network, but due to the channel being replaced by Discovery Family; none of these productions aired. Also that month, A^{2} merged with Genius Brands with the Heywards of A2 taking over management of the post-merger Genius Brands.

== Comic book ==
Mighty 7
- Stan Lee's Mighty 7 #1 (March 2012)

Group publication information
- Publisher: Stan Lee Comics (Archie Comics)
- First appearance: Stan Lee' Mighty 7 #1 (March 2012)
- Created by: Stan Lee

In-story information
- Member(s): Strongarm; Laser Lord; High Rise; Vanisher; Hip Hop; Lady Lightning; Silver Sparrow

Stan Lee's Mighty 7

Series publication information
- Schedule: Bimonthly
- Format: Limited
- Genre: Superhero
- Publication date: March 2012

Creative team
- Writer(s): Stan Lee; Tony Blake; Paul Jackson
- Artist(s): Alex Saviuk
- Creator(s): Stan Lee

=== Publication history ===
In February 2010, the Stan Lee Comics print and digital comic book line was announced with the first title "Stan Lee's Super Seven" plan to be launched in July. Tom DeFalco was initially chosen as the main author. In the fall, animated webisodes were expected to start up. In August, Super7, a toy manufacturer, sued over Stan Lee's Super Seven for trademark infringement.

In March 2012, the first issue of renamed "Stan Lee's Mighty 7" six issue miniseries was published. The first two issues sold out. Only three issues were printed because of interest in using the concept for a possible animated series or movie trilogy. Digital issues were supposed to resume in 2014, but as of 2015 it hasn't happened.

=== Plot ===
The concept is that Stan Lee is a character in the story, as himself, who runs into two groups of aliens that he mentors to be a superhero team while he uses them to write comic books. The aliens consist of two marshals transporting five criminals that crash land on Earth. Besides Lee, a covert government agency is aware that they land with a leader of a military unit becoming an antagonist of the team.

== Animated film ==
Stan Lee's Mighty 7
- Based on: Stan Lee's Mighty 7 by: Stan Lee
- Starring: Armie Hammer; Christian Slater; Mayim Bialik; Teri Hatcher; Flea; Darren Criss; Sean Astin
- Country of origin: United States

Production
- Running time: 66 minutes
- Production companies: Stan Lee Comics; Genius Brands

Original release
- Network: Hub Network (TV)
- Release: February 1, 2014

=== Film history ===
In April 2012, Stan Lee's Mighty 7 was slated to be developed into media formats via A Squared Elxsi Entertainment LLC (A2E2). A^{2}E2 is a joint-venture between A Squared Entertainment (A^{2}) and Tata Elxsi formed in January 2011 which Elxsi ends in October 2012.

In September 2012, A^{2} signed a foreign distribution agreement with PGS Entertainment for its programming library, including the Mighty 7 pilot animated movie with a possible 26 episode pickup. Also, Gaiam Vivendi Entertainment was signed on as home video distributor and Hub Network as its world television premiere channel.

PGS Entertainment was shopping Mighty 7 as a trilogy of animated movies at MIP-TV in April 2013.

On March 16, 2013, Hub Network announced its pick up of "Stan Lee's Mighty 7" animated pilot movie. Two more films and a TV series were planned to air on Hub Network, but due to the channel being replaced by Discovery Family; none of these productions have aired as of August 21, 2015 and it is unknown if they were ever completed due to Stan Lee's death in November 2018. Also that month, A^{2} merged with Genius Brands with the Heywards of A2 taking over management of the post-merger Genius Brands.

Genius Brands International in March 2015 placed the movie's rights with:

- TF1 for pan-European, French-speaking VOD, SVOD and EST rights,
- Teletoon for Canada broadcasting rights
- Sony's Pop Channel for UK broadcasting rights
- The Movie Partnership for market representation of all UK digital rights
- Telepictures Promoter for Middle East and North Africa Arabic-speaking countries broadcast TV rights.

Beginnings premiered on February 1, 2014. On April 15, "Stan Lee's Mighty 7: Beginnings" was released on DVD and Blu-ray via Cinedigm at Walmart and Sam's Club for an initial exclusive window. The DVD had a number of Stan Lee featuring material.

=== Cast and characters ===
- Stan Lee as himself
- Armie Hammer as Strong Arm, who has super strength.
- Christian Slater as Lazer Lord, who hurls balls of laser energy.
- Mayim Bialik as Lady Lightning, who possesses super speed.
- Teri Hatcher as Silver Skylark, who flies.
- Flea as Roller Man, who rolls into a big ball and launches at high speed.
- Darren Criss as Micro, who shrinks in size.
- Sean Astin as Kid Kinergy, who possesses telekinesis.
- Jim Belushi as Mr. Cross, the leader of a covert operations military division assigned to investigate UFO sightings.
- Michael Ironside as Xanar, the leader of the warring aliens from the planet Taegon who enslave other planets and raid their natural resources."

== Stan Lee Comics ==
Stan Lee Comics, LLC
- Type: Joint venture
- Industry: Entertainment
- Founded: February 2008; 18 years ago
- Key people: Stan Lee
- Products: Comic books
- Brands: Stan Lee's Mighty 7 The Governator
- Services: licensing
- Owners: POW! Entertainment; Genius Brands

Stan Lee Comics, LLC is a comic book and licensing joint venture of POW! Entertainment and Genius Brands.

In February 2010, POW! partnered with Andy Heyward's A Squared Entertainment (now a part of Genius Brands International) and Archie Comics to create the Stan Lee Comics joint venture.

The second title announced for the imprint was The Governator on March 30, 2011 with the comic book title coming out first in 2012 as part of larger set of releases. The title was soon place on hold with the rest of the franchise in May 2011.
