= Windlight Studios =

American computer animation company

- Founded: 1993; 33 years ago
- Defunct: 1997
- Fate: Folded into Nelvana
- Headquarters: Minneapolis, Minnesota, United States

Windlight Studios was a computer animation and visual effects' company established in 1993, and based in Minneapolis, Minnesota. It was folded into the holdings of Canada's Nelvana studio in 1997. Its co-founder, Scott Dyer, became Nelvana's senior vice president in charge of production in late 2001.
