= Kartoon Studios =

American entertainment company

Kartoon Studios, Inc.
- Logo used since 2023
- Formerly: Pacific Entertainment Corporation (2006–2011); Genius Brands International, Inc. (2011–2023)
- Type: Public
- Traded as: AMEX: TOON
- Industry: Entertainment
- Predecessors: Genius Products
- Founded: 2006; 20 years ago
- Founders: Klaus Moeller; Larry Balaban; Howard Balaban; Mike Meader
- Headquarters: Beverly Hills, California, US
- Key people: Andy Heyward (chairman and CEO); Margaret Loesch (executive chairman, Kartoon Channel); Brian Parisi (CFO)
- Products: Animation; Licensing
- Revenue: ▲US$39.4 million (2025)
- Net income: ▼ −US$24.5 million (2025)
- Subsidiaries: See § Units
- Website: kartoonstudios.com

Kartoon Studios, Inc. is an American entertainment company that was formed in 2006 by Klaus Moeller, Larry Balaban, Howard Balaban and Mike Meader as Pacific Entertainment Corporation and in 2011, changed its name to Genius Brands International. In 2013, GBI initiated a 50-50 merger with A Squared Entertainment, the company of Andy Heyward and his wife Amy Moynihan Heyward, which led to them taking over the company.

== History ==
=== Background ===
==== A Squared Entertainment ====
Andy Heyward's previous company, DIC Entertainment, signed a TV series production deal in July 2003 with Stan Lee's POW! Entertainment for Stan Lee's Secret Super Six. In 2006, DIC was in development on Secret Millionaires Club with Berkshire Hathaway chairman Warren Buffett.

A Squared Entertainment (A^{2}, A Squared) was formed by Heyward and his wife, Amy Moynihan Heyward, in 2009 as an animation company. The company had an initial four-show celebrity-inspired cartoon slate to be seen on AOL starting in Q4 2009 with the last starting in 2010. The four shows would then switch from a webisode format of 26 episodes of three-to-five-minutes, to TV with 13, 22-minute shows. The slate then consisted of Secret Millionaires Club, GiGi and The Green Team (working title), Little Martha (working title) and Kosmos. Kosmos was a series to be based on Carl Sagan's life as a famous astronomer.

A^{2}'s first animated program was Secret Millionaires Club, which features an animated Buffett as a secret mentor to a group of enterprising children. Martha & Friends with Martha Stewart and Gisele & the Green Team with Gisele Bundchen were created and launched by A Square.

In February 2010, A^{2} partnered with POW! Entertainment and Archie Comics to create the Stan Lee Comics joint venture for the Stan Lee's Super Seven franchise. On December 7, 2010, A Squared launched Gisele & The Green Team webseries in conjunction with AOLkids.com and Gisele Bündchen.

In April 2012, Stan Lee's Mighty 7 was slated to be developed for other media formats via A Squared Elxsi Entertainment LLC (A2E2). A^{2}E2 was a joint-venture between A Squared Entertainment (A^{2}) and Tata Elxsi formed in January 2011 which Elxsi ends in October 2012. Also in 2012, A^{2} took over Archies' ownership stake in Stan Lee Comics.

By November 2013, A^{2} had Thomas Edison's Secret Lab in development.

==== Pacific Entertainment ====
Pacific Entertainment Corporation was founded by Baby Genius creators Klaus Moeller and Larry Balaban alongside Howard Balaban and Mike Meader in 2006. In January 2006, Pacific Entertainment purchased Baby Genius and other lines from Genius Products, Inc. for $3 million. The other lines were preschool brands such as Wee Worship and the Little Tikes music and DVD series. Genius Products retained exclusive U.S. distribution rights for the lines.

GBI licensed Baby Genius in January 2011 to Jakks Pacific's Tollytots division for a musical and early learning toy line. At Toy Fair 2012, Tollytots introduced the line with 20 products.

==== As Genius Brands ====
In December 2011, Pacific Entertainment Corporation changed its name to Genius Brands International, Inc. (GBI). Genius Brands digitized its Baby Genius book line in July 2013 via a deal with Graphicly. In November 2013, a merger between GBI and A^{2} Entertainment took place, with the Heywards of A2 taking over as top executives. Pre-merged Genius Brands CEO Klaus Moeller moved to vice president of special markets at GBI. GBI's board of directors included former California governor Gray Davis and American Greetings Corp. president-COO Jeff Weiss.

The Baby Genius video on demand subscription service launched in April 2014. GBI launched a VOD channel of children's entertainment called Kid Genius in October 2015, through Comcast's Xfinity On Demand.

In June 2014, Genius Brands agreed to license Baby Genius, Secret Millionaires Club and Thomas Edison's Secret Lab to LeapFrog Enterprises for kids' learning tablets. The first few Leap Frog tablet apps from the deal were released in December 2014, with two for both Baby Genius and Secret Millionaires Club.

GBI issued and sold 4.3 million shares of stock and warrants in November 2014 to investors and management at par $1. The raised working capital would be used for brand marketing, new property acquisition and development and the Kid Genius channel.

===== 2016–2019 =====
Penguin Young Readers and author/illustrator Anna Dewdney signed an agreement with Genius to develop animated content and manage licensing for the Llama Llama franchise in February 2016. The products, from apparel to toys, are slated to arrive in 2016.

In February 2016, Genius Brands and Sony Pictures Home Entertainment announced a multi-year marketing and distribution agreement for four existing properties plus three under development. Existing properties under the deal are SpacePop, a new original Baby Genius series, Secret Millionaires Club and Stan Lee's Mighty 7. The new Baby Genius series would be relaunched on Amazon.com in September.

The company paired for another Sony agreement in April 2016. This agreement was with Sony Music Entertainment's Legacy Recordings for the Genius Brands Music label. The label would have two age-focused imprints, for toddlers, Baby Genius, and children-to-tweens, Kid Genius.

In September 2016, GBI introduced Rainbow Rangers, a new concept that was expected to debut as a Q3 2017 special and a full series in Q2 2018.

The Kid Genius channel expanded to a small network of on demand channels with its offerings first on Comcast on Demand with a Baby Genius TV channel. The company launched Kid Genius Cartoons Plus! on Amazon Channels starting on September 28, 2017. Plus included all GBI programming plus other acquired programming. Genius Brands Network in July 2019 added content from kids gaming company Tankee to its channels.

In January 2017, Sony Pictures Home Entertainment expanded its distribution deal to all properties and took an equity stake in Genius Brands. In November 2017, the company filed with the SEC to resell 1.65 million shares of stock.

Genius issued a convertible debt round bringing in $4.5 million in August 2018 which was led by financier Robert Wolf of 32 Ventures and was oversubscribed bringing in both existing and new investors. In September 2018, Bank Lemi extended a $6 million bank facility allowing Genius to produce a second season of Llama Llama.

===== 2020–2023 =====
In May 2020, the company's stock value jumped 2000% with four announced stock sales that month, after being put on notice by NASDAQ for low share value, which might have triggered delisting. The reason for the jump was the company's announcement of the launch date of its Kartoon Channel, and Mattel's Rainbow Rangers toys gaining shelf space at Walmart in summer 2020. With the announcement of registering a stockholder stock sale on June 4, the stock broke its run up with a 13% drop. Kartoon Channel, which was a merger of its existing channels, launched on June 15, 2020, on four more platforms.

On July 6, 2020, Genius Brands acquired exclusive worldwide rights to use Stan Lee's name, physical likeness and signature from POW! Entertainment as well as licensing rights to his name and over 100 of POW's original IPs. The assets will be placed under a new joint-venture with POW!, called Stan Lee Universe, managed by Genius. Michael E. Uslan was hired to advise Genius on Lee Universe film and TV projects. Genius then arranged a publishing deal with Archie Comics for the Stan Lee Universe comic book imprint, starting with an adaptation of Kindergarten Cop.

On October 27, 2021, Genius announced they would acquire the Canada-based Wow Unlimited Media for $53 Million, allowing Genius to expand to the country. The transaction was slated to be completed in Q1 2022, pending regulatory approval. The acquisition was completed on April 7 of that year.

On January 4, 2023, Genius Brands announced that they would sell a 50% stake in the Frederator shows Bravest Warriors, Bee and PuppyCat and then-upcoming series Catbug to Toho International. The deal would allow the two companies to provide frameworks, to co-produce new content based on the properties and develop consumer product campaigns. Toho would also gain Asian distribution rights to the properties.

==== As Kartoon Studios ====
===== 2023–present =====
On June 26, 2023, Genius Brands announced that was changing its name to Kartoon Studios and would transfer its shares to NYSE American. In July 2023, Kartoon Studios partnered with VeVe to release non-fungible tokens of Stan Lee, which sold out nearly instantly. That same month, they also announced the launch of a division for animated feature films under the name Kartoon Films. The division's slate of films was said to heavily utilize artificial intelligence technology, and was slated to debut in 2024. There has not been any news about this division since its announcement.

In 2024, Kartoon Studios announced that they would create a generative AI toolkit designed for development and production of animated media, branded as Gadget A.I. (named for the titular character of Inspector Gadget), which would be only used within the company and would not be licensed out to third-parties. WildBrain (owners of the Inspector Gadget IP) made an IP infringement complaint following the announcement.

In 2026, Kartoon sold Channel Frederator Network to an undisclosed buyer.

== Units ==
=== Current ===
- Kartoon Films
- Kartoon Studios Productions (formerly A Squared Entertainment LLC)
- Kartoon Channel
- Toon Media Networks
  - Kartoon Channel (formerly Kid Genius Network)
  - Ameba TV
- Beacon Media Group
- Stan Lee Universe (joint venture with POW! Entertainment)
  - Stan Lee Comics LLC (currently only for the Stan Lee's Mighty 7 franchise)
- Wow Unlimited Media
  - Mainframe Studios
  - Frederator Networks, Inc.
    - Frederator Studios
    - Channel Frederator Network
      - StashRiot (channel is unknown)
      - Cartoon Hangover
      - Frederator Flux
        - ChannelFrederator
        - The Leaderboard Network
        - Cinematica
        - MicDrop (music division of the channel)
        - Átomo Network (Spanish-language YouTube channel joint venture with Ánima Estudios)
    - Frederator Books
    - Thirty Labs
  - Ezrin Hirsh Entertainment (EHE)
- Genius Brands Music
  - Baby Genius
  - Kid Genius
- Your Family Entertainment (32.5%)

=== Former ===
- Kid Genius Cartoon Channel
- Baby Genius TV
- Kid Genius Cartoons Plus!

== Kartoon Channel ==
Kartoon Channel
- Country: United States

Programming
- Language: English

Ownership
- Owner: Kartoon Studios

History
- Launched: October 2015
- Former names: Kid Genius Cartoon

Links
- Website: www.kartoonchannel.com

Kartoon Channel (formerly Kid Genius Channel) is a video on demand channel owned by Kartoon Studios.

The Kid Genius Channel was launched by GBI with children's entertainment in October 2015, through Comcast's Xfinity On Demand. Debra Pierson was named general manager for the channel in March 2016.

In December 2016, Margaret Loesch was named Executive Chairman of the Kids Genius Channel with Pierson promoted to channel president. The channel was added to several over-the-top media services including Roku, Apple TV and Amazon Fire, the week of February 2017.

Kartoon Channel, which is the merger of its existing channels, was announced to be launched on June 15, 2020, on four more platforms. Loesch would continue to serve as executive chair, while adding former president of Walt Disney Television David Neuman as chief creative officer of the streaming service.

=== Programming ===
Initial

- Stan Lee's Mighty 7 (Plus!)
- Where on Earth Is Carmen Sandiego?
- Dennis the Menace

Later acquired

- Eddie Is a Yeti (Plus!)
- Nancy Drew Codes & Clues
- LaGolda, a UnitedHealthcare production of a soccer bilingual animated children's series (Plus!)

Baby Genius TV

- The Adventures of Paddington Bear
- Rainbow Valley Fire Department
- Baby Prodigy
- Igloo-Gloo
- Pirates: Adventures in Art
- So! Smart
- ToddWorld
- Baby Genius Nursery Rhymes
- Baby Genius Animals

Plus!

- Inspector Gadget
- Liberty's Kids
- DinoSquad
- Carl Squared
- Heads Up
- The Day Henry Met
- So Smart!
- Baby Prodigy
- Happy Kids

== Production library ==
Title	Year(s)	Type	Production partner(s)	Distributor	Kid Genius Cartoon Channel	Notes
Gisele & The Green Team	2010–2012	Animated series	A Squared; AOL; Xing Xing Animation; Gisele Bündchen	AOLkids.com	(Plus!)	
Martha & Friends	2011	Animated series	A Squared; Martha Stewart Living Omnimedia	AOLkids.com	(Plus!)	
Martha's Magnificent Egg	2012	Animated film	A Squared; Martha Stewart Living Omnimedia	Hallmark Channel	—N/a	
Secret Millionaires Club	October 23, 2011–October 12, 2014	Animated series	Berkshire Hathaway; Bang Zoom! Entertainment; Xing Xing Animation; Hub Network	Sony Pictures Home Entertainment	initial (Plus!)	
Secret Millionaires Club	2014	Tablet apps	Leap Frog Enterprises		—N/a	Secret Millionaires Club: New Beginnings; Secret Millionaires Club: Rhythm and Responsibility
Baby Genius	December 2014	Tablet apps	Leap Frog Enterprises		—N/a	
Baby Genius	September 2015–	Animated series		Sony Pictures Home Entertainment		
Thomas Edison's Secret Lab	April 2015	Animated series	Symbiosys Technologies; Telegael; GPB	APT	initial (Plus!)	
SpacePop	2016–	Animated series	Symbiosys Technologies; Telegael	Sony Pictures Home Entertainment	initial (Plus!)	2 seasons
SpacePop	2016–	Books	Imprint (an imprint of Macmillan Children's Publishing Group)	Macmillan Publishers Services	—N/a	Not Your Average Princesses (July 2016) written by Erin Downing and illustrated by Jen Bartel; Rocking the Resistance (January 2017)
SpacePop	2018	Animated film				Not Your Average Princesses
Llama Llama	2018–2020	Animated series	Telegael	NCircle Entertainment; Netflix		Season 1: 15 30-minute episodes; Season 2: 16 11-minute episodes; Specials: 2 30-minute episodes
Llama Llama	2018–2020	Merchandising	Kids Preferred (toy)			
Rainbow Rangers	November 5, 2018–April 15, 2022	Animated series	Telegael	Nick Jr. Channel; APC Kids (EMEA distribution)		52 11-minute episodes
Rainbow Rangers	2019	Books	Imprint	Macmillan Publishers Services		
Rainbow Rangers	2019	Live touring	Gershwin Entertainment	—N/a		
Superhero Kindergarten	2021	Animated series	POW! Entertainment; Oak Productions; Telegael	Kartoon Channel		Arnold Schwarzenegger as Arnold Armstrong/Captain Courage & co-executive producer; Stan Lee as creator; Fabian Nicieza as writer; Paul Wachter, CEO of Main Street Advisors, as executive producer; 52 30-minute episodes
Shaq's Garage	2023–	Animated series	Telegael	Kartoon Channel		
Bitcoin Brigade: Adventures in Satoshi City	2026	Animated series	Bitkern	Kartoon Channel		
Hundred Acre Wood: Winnie and Friends	December 2026	Animated film		Kartoon Channel		
Hundred Acre Wood: Winnie and Friends	TBA	Animated series		Kartoon Channel		
Heroes at Large	2027	Animated film	Mainframe Studios	GFM Animation		
Silver Sentinel	2027	Animated film	Mainframe Studios	GFM Animation		
