= Channel Frederator Network =

Frederator Studios Network

- Company type: Division
- Industry: Entertainment
- Predecessor: Frederator Studios and Next New Networks
- Founded: November 2012; 13 years ago
- Founder: Fred Seibert
- Headquarters: New York City, New York, United States
- Number of locations: 1, located in Manhattan
- Key people: Kenny Ash (Network Director)
- Products: Channel Frederator; Fredbot
- Revenue: 70% (creator); 30% (network)
- Parent: Frederator Networks
- Website: channelfrederatornetwork.com channelfrederator.com

The Channel Frederator Network is an American animation, video game and pop culture multi-channel network founded by cartoon producer and serial media entrepreneur Fred Seibert and managed by Frederator Networks.

After launching Frederator Studios, Seibert spent a year as president of MTV Networks Online, realizing the potential of streaming video programming and distribution.

== History ==
The origin of the Channel Frederator Network can be traced back as early as 2005, when Seibert founded Channel Frederator, and originally launched as the "first cartoon video podcast" on November 2, 2005, distributing episodes through Apple's iTunes onto devices like the Apple iPod and the Sony PlayStation Portable (PSP). According to the launch press release, Channel Frederator's weekly episodes "will contain several short form original and vintage cartoons submitted by producers from around the world, packaged into 10 to 15 minute episodes." Tumblr founder David Karp edited the first week's episodes, created its first website, and co-designed the channel logo. The original format was three independently produced animated films separated by Adult Swim-like promos and Channel Frederator logos. Channel Frederator began distributing on the YouTube platform on February 23, 2007. The channel’s success led to his creation of Next New Networks with Emil Rensing and, eventually, a group of co-founders. Next New Networks invented the concept of the Multi-Channel Network, eventually distributing dozens of creator owned video channels and becoming one of YouTube’s top 5 view contributors. Google and YouTube acquired the company in 2010, with Seibert retaining ownership of Channel Frederator, and subsequently creating Frederator Networks as the parent company.

In 2012, Frederator Studios began producing television-quality cartoons for the Internet as part of the $100 million YouTube Original Channel Initiative, and has since produced two successful series and many successful shorts as Too Cool! Cartoons and GO! Cartoons, including Pendleton Ward's Bravest Warriors, Natasha Allegri's Bee and PuppyCat and Elyse Castro's The Summoning.

In the summer 2014, Seibert launched the Channel Frederator Network as an animation multi-channel network, eventually becoming the largest animation network on YouTube.

In 2022, Ethan Schulteis (The Amagi) began managing the Official Youtube channel of the network and later took charge of Cinematica, the live-action channel.

=== Affiliated influencers ===
Among the network’s leading channels are Jaiden Animations, Domics, FilmCow, Cartoon Hangover, and RebelTaxi.

Once part of the network, Channel Frederator handles all advertising and distribution for its channels on YouTube, promoting the show and its licensed merchandise; the network also provides on-demand consulting, and weekly events for open to all network members.

== Parent company ==
Channel Frederator is a division of Frederator Networks, which itself is part of the media holding company Wow Unlimited Media (itself a subsidiary of Kartoon Studios). Frederator Networks was founded in 2012 by Frederator Studios founder Fred Seibert to build a media company that organizes and super serves specialized audiences with online video. In addition to Channel Frederator and Cartoon Hangover, Frederator Networks also operates Frederator Books, and Frederator Studios, which produced Castlevania for Netflix, among other television series, such as Butch Hartman's The Fairly OddParents for Nickelodeon and Pendleton Ward's Adventure Time for Cartoon Network.
