= Frederator Networks =

Media company

Frederator Networks, Inc.
- Type: Subsidiary
- Industry: Digital Media
- Founded: 2012; 14 years ago
- Founder: Fred Seibert
- Headquarters: New York City, New York, U.S.
- Parent: Wow Unlimited Media (2016–present)
- Divisions: Frederator Studios; Channel Frederator Network
- Website: frederator.com

Frederator Networks, Inc. is a media company founded by Fred Seibert. It makes and distributes cartoons, often on Channel Frederator, and through its in-house animation studio Frederator Studios. It is the largest distributor of independent animation online.

On October 26, 2016, Canadian animation studio Rainmaker Entertainment acquired Frederator Networks, Inc. Rainmaker subsequently rebranded as Wow Unlimited Media. In October 2021, Genius Brands (subsequently Kartoon Studios), controlled by Andy Heyward, acquired WOW! and Frederator.

== Partnered content ==
=== Fin Punch/Personas Cetaceas ===
In February 2015, Frederator Networks acquired worldwide distribution rights to Personas Cetaceas, a Spanish language Chilean animated series, originally called Personas Cetaceas. It was renamed Fin Punch, dubbed into English, and hosted on Cartoon Hangover

=== Sony collaboration ===
In 2014, Frederator Networks and Sony Pictures Animation announced their new joint project, GO! Cartoons. Twelve, five-minute, animated shorts were planned to be viewed on Cartoon Hangover in 2016, but the series would eventually premiere on November 7, 2017. One of them will be picked to become an animated series on Cartoon Hangover.

== Operating units ==
=== Channel Frederator Network ===
Channel Frederator Network (CFN) is a YouTube multi-channel network focused specifically on animation. They have signed 1,222 YouTube creators. As of October 2017, CFN has over 1 billion monthly views. In 2022, Channel Frederator entrusted Ethan Schulteis and his team with overseeing the management of the YouTube channel.

=== Frederator Studios ===
Frederator Studios is an animation studio run by Fred Seibert, who is largely known as the executive producer of Adventure Time, The Fairly OddParents, and other animated series.

=== Frederator Digital ===
Frederator Digital is a subsidiary of Frederator Networks that creates unscripted, informational and scripted programming for streaming on the internet. It is currently producing a series of 107 Facts videos, which can be seen on Channel Frederator, Cartoon Hangover, Cinematica, The Leaderboard, and MicDrop on YouTube

=== The Leaderboard Network ===
The Leaderboard Network is a YouTube multi-channel network that focuses exclusively on video games and gaming. Its main YouTube channel, The Leaderboard, launched in April 2015 and as of 2017 has over 550,000 subscribers with over 90 million views.

=== Cinematica ===
The Cinematica Network is a YouTube multi-channel network that focuses exclusively on TV and movies. Its main YouTube channel, Cinematica, was created in August 2015. Subsequently, Ethan Schulteis was appointed to lead the channel, which now boasts over 300,000 subscribers and 75 million views.

=== Átomo Network ===
In February 2016, Frederator Networks partnered with Ánima Estudios to launch the Átomo Network, a multi-channel network exclusively for Spanish speaking YouTube animation channels.
