= Wow Unlimited Media =

Canadian animation company

Wow Unlimited Media Inc.
- Type: Subsidiary
- Traded as: TSX-V: WOW
- Industry: Animation; Media
- Founded: October 26, 2016; 10 years ago
- Headquarters: Toronto, Ontario, Canada
- Key people: Neil Chakravarti (COO and president); John Vandervelde (CFO); Michael Hefferon (president, Mainframe Studios)
- Parent: Kartoon Studios (2022–present)
- Subsidiaries: Mainframe Studios; Frederator Networks; Ezrin Hirsh Entertainment
- Website: www.wowunlimited.co

Wow Unlimited Media Inc. (stylized as WOW! Unlimited Media) is a Canadian animation and media holding company. It was formed as a result of a merger between Rainmaker Entertainment, Frederator Networks and Ezrin Hirsh Entertainment (EHE). The company is currently a subsidiary of American-based Kartoon Studios.

== History ==
On October 26, 2016, a three-way merger was announced between Rainmaker and Frederator, with the addition of EHE. On December 16 of that year, the merger was completed.

On June 7, 2017, the company announced its intent to acquire an unspecified category B specialty television service from Bell Media, later revealed by company president Randy Lennox to be Comedy Gold, to form a television channel that will carry programs targeting children and young adults. The company also entered into agreements to provide content for Bell Media's over-the-top content services (including CraveTV). In exchange for the channel, Bell Canada will acquire 3.4 million common voting shares in the company. Bell confirmed the deal in September 2017, further stating that it had agreed to provide operational services for the channel, and co-develop content.

The sale of Comedy Gold to Wow Unlimited Media was approved on July 9, 2018, and CraveTV launched "Wow! Preschool Playdate" and "Wow! World Kids" collections in September. However, on March 12, 2019, Wow issued a press release announcing an extension to the transfer of the channel's license "to pursue sponsorships and partnerships".

On July 24, 2019, a representative of Bell Support revealed that Comedy Gold would be shutting down anywhere between August 30 and September 1; Comedy Gold was ultimately shuttered on September 1, 2019. Wow would reveal in their Q2 financial report that they would have completed their acquisition of Comedy Gold's broadcast license on August 30, 2019. However, the license was revoked on February 5, 2021 before it could ever be launched.

On October 27, 2021, Genius Brands (now Kartoon Studios) announced that it had agreed to acquire Wow Unlimited Media for C$66 million (US$53 million), with the transaction is expected to close in the first quarter of 2022. The acquisition was completed on April 7, 2022.

== Assets ==
- Mainframe Studios
- Frederator Networks, Inc.
  - Frederator Studios
    - Frederator Films
  - Channel Frederator Network
    - StashRiot (channel is unknown)
    - Cartoon Hangover
    - Frederator Flux
      - ChannelFrederator
      - The Leaderboard Network
      - Cinematica
      - MicDrop (music division of the channel)
      - Átomo Network (Spanish-language YouTube channel joint venture with Ánima Estudios)
  - Frederator Books
  - Thirty Labs
- Ezrin Hirsh Entertainment (EHE)
