= Go! Cartoons =

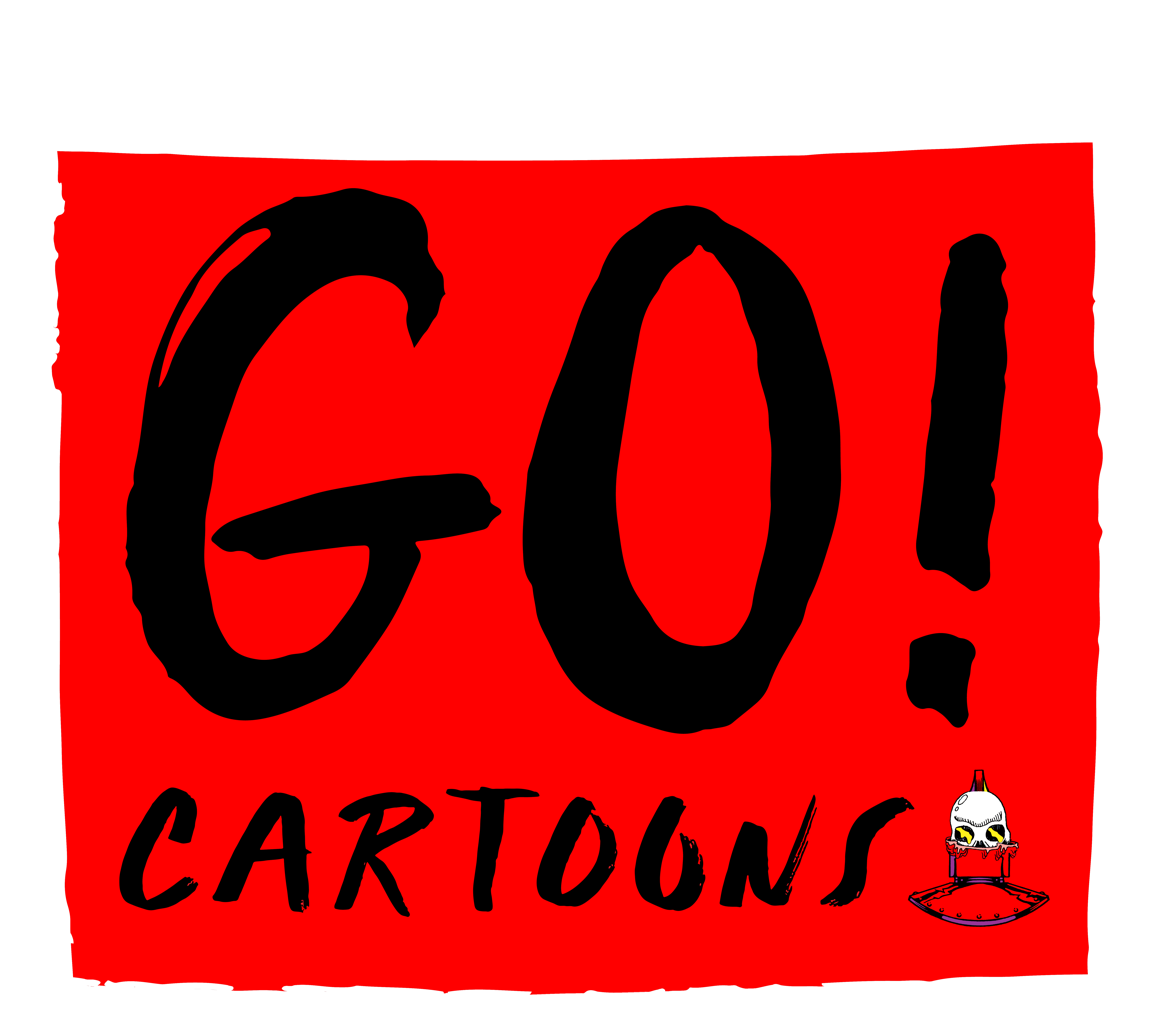
- Genre: Variety
- Created by: Fred Seibert
- Country of origin: United States
- Original language: English
- No. of episodes: 12

Production
- Executive producer: Fred Seibert
- Producers: Kevin Kolde; Eric Homan
- Running time: 5 minutes
- Production companies: Frederator Studios; Sony Pictures Animation

Original release
- Network: Cartoon Hangover
- Release: November 7, 2017 – April 10, 2018

Go! Cartoons, stylized as GO! Cartoons, is an American web series of animated shorts produced by Frederator Studios and Sony Pictures Animation. The series premiered on November 7, 2017, with the short The Summoning. It features 12 shorts, airing on VRV and Cartoon Hangover's YouTube channel. Go! Cartoons is Frederator Studios' sixth cartoon "incubator" series since 1998.

== Description ==
Go! Cartoons showcases animated shorts and is designed to find "tomorrow’s cartoon hitmakers". Each cartoon short can act as a pilot, with the most successful cartoons having an opportunity to be produced as a full series on Cartoon Hangover or elsewhere. Several animated television series have started in similar incubator-type formats, including Adventure Time and Bee and PuppyCat.

The project began in 2014 when Frederator Studios and Sony Pictures Animation called for pitches from animators around the world. Twelve five-minute shorts were produced, and one would become a limited series on Cartoon Hangover. As of September 1, 2023, none of the shorts have become a series. However, on February 7, 2025, it was announced that The Summoning will be released as a three-part graphic novel series published by Oni Press. The Summoning Volume One: The Art of the Craft was published on October 7, 2025. The Summoning Volume Two: Losing the Familiar will be published on December 8, 2026.

== List of episodes ==
| No. | Title | Directed by | Created and Written by | Storyboard by | Release date | Ref |
|---|---|---|---|---|---|---|
| 1 | "The Summoning" | Natasha Allegri | Elyse Castro | Natasha Allegri | November 7, 2017 | |
Claire the witch needs troll fat for her brew, so she ends up going on an adventure with her cat Edgar.
| 2 | "Boots" | Larry Huber | David Cowles & Alison Cowles | David Cowles & Alison Cowles | November 21, 2017 | |
Boots desires the chair discarded by her neighbor Chad, but does not want him to notice.
| 3 | "City Dwellers" | Grant Kolton | Grant Kolton | Grant Kolton | December 5, 2017 | |
Dog walkers Bruce and Biff are asked by Nina to avoid certain areas since her dog Marty is a ninja. When they get distracted by a sandwich shop, Marty goes on the loose, and they have to retrieve him.
| 4 | "Rachel and Her Grandfather Control the Island" | Jonni Peppers | Jonni Peppers | Jonni Peppers | December 19, 2017 | |
Rachel and her grandfather want to take over the island by installing surveillance equipment robots out of their trash cans, but they first have to convince the president to get rid of the law banning trash cans.
| 5 | "Nebulous" | Larry Huber | Brent Sievers | Brent Sievers | January 2, 2018 | |
A trio of space delivery folks stop by a grease planet for food.
| 6 | "Welcome to Doozy" | Kathleen Good | Kate Tsang & Jennifer Suhr | Angelica Russell | January 16, 2018 | |
Ex tries to impress her work crush Skeletim with a bento, but when it gets enchanted by her friend Lou, it becomes an out-of-control monster.
| 7 | "Both Brothers" | Larry Huber | Juris Lisovs | Juris Lisovs | January 30, 2018 | |
Brothers Tod and Klod are upset that the snow park is closed because the weather is too nice, so they tell the sun to go away. However, when the sun does just that, it gets really cold and the crowd becomes angry. The two brothers try to apologize to the sun.
| 8 | "The Bagheads: Get Trashed" | Michelle Bryan | D.R. Beitzel | Jojo Baptista | February 13, 2018 | {{[19]}} |
Paperbag-faced siblings Artemis and Elbow compete over who has to take out the trash using the rule that if their addition to the trash stack falls to the floor they lose.
| 9 | "Tyler & Co." | Gabe Janisz | Gabe Janisz | Justin Noel | February 27, 2018 | |
Tyler the Liger has a enough box tops to become the Mayor of Cereal Town, but he needs to find a way out of the house that has been locked by its upside down door to mail them in.
| 10 | "Kid Arthur" | Larry Huber | Joel Veitch & David Shute | David Shute | March 13, 2018 | |
Arthur and his friend/arch-nemesis Mordred continue their battle while trying to do a test in school.
| 11 | "Thrashin' USA" | Tom King | Rory Panagotopulos | Tom King | March 27, 2018 | |
While on his way to the skate park, skater Pau gets trapped in his grumpy next door neighbor Mrs. Tracy's house and is forced to do her skateboard arena of death by her.
| 12 | "Pottyhorse" | Damien Barchowsky & Jeff Drake | Damien Barchowsky & Jeff Drake | Damien Barchowsky | April 10, 2018 | |
Pottyhorse the town's sheriff and only toilet has to find a way to stop a poopsteorid from hitting the town.

== See also ==
- Wow Unlimited Media, a Canadian-American animation organization and Frederator Networks, Inc. holding company.
- Bee and PuppyCat, a cartoon series that started as an animated short from Frederator Studios.
