= Frederator Studios =

American animation television production studio

- Logo used as of 2009
- Formerly: Frederator Incorporated (1997–2009)
- Type: Division
- Industry: Animation
- Predecessor: Fred/Alan; Chauncey Street Productions, Inc.
- Founded: January 6, 1997; 29 years ago
- Founder: Fred Seibert
- Headquarters: New York City, New York, Burbank, California, U.S.
- Key people: Michael Hirsh (CEO); Kevin Kolde (vice president Production); Isabel Bailin (Director of Development)
- Products: Television production Film production
- Brands: Oh Yeah! Cartoons; The Fairly OddParents; ChalkZone; My Life as a Teenage Robot; Nicktoons Film Festival; Random! Cartoons; Fanboy & Chum Chum; Adventure Time; Bravest Warriors; Too Cool! Cartoons; Castlevania; Bee and PuppyCat
- Services: Traditional animation Stop-motion animation CGI animation Flash animation
- Parent: Frederator Networks, Inc. (2012–present)
- Divisions: Bolder Media (co-owned with Mixed Media Group); Frederator Books; Channel Frederator Network
- Website: frederatorstudios.com

Frederator Studios is an American television animation production studio founded by Fred Seibert in January 1997. It is a division of Frederator Networks, itself a part of Wow Unlimited Media.

Frederator and Seibert have been credited with producing various, critically-acclaimed media projects, predominantly in animation suitable for general audiences. The studio has offices in New York City and Burbank, California.

In 2016, Frederator was acquired by Canadian animation studio Rainmaker, and merged into Wow! Unlimited Media where Seibert was Chief Creator Officer; he remained at the company until August 2020. After departing, he founded a successor company, FredFilms, in February 2021.

== History ==
=== Founding and early years ===
Before Frederator, in 1983, Fred Seibert founded Fred/Alan, Inc. in New York City with his college friend Alan Goodman; in 1988, Fred/Alan partnered with Albie Hecht at Chauncey Street Productions to produce television programs for Nickelodeon, MTV, A&E, and CBS. The Fred/Alan firm closed down in 1992.

Seibert became the president of Hanna-Barbera Cartoons in 1992, and created What a Cartoon!, a showcase consisting of 48 shorts that aired on Cartoon Network. In 1996, when Time Warner merged with Turner Broadcasting (owner of Hanna-Barbera), he left the studio.

Frederator Incorporated was formed on January 6, 1997 (its first cartoons were released in 1998), and was housed at a temporary location of the Nickelodeon Animation Studios in North Hollywood, California. Frederator's debut production was the cartoon short incubator, a television series called Oh Yeah! Cartoons, which later spun off three series: The Fairly OddParents (its first official series), as well ChalkZone and My Life as a Teenage Robot, in addition to 51 original short cartoons from creators including Butch Hartman, Rob Renzetti, Tim Biskup, Larry Huber, Pat Ventura, Seth MacFarlane, and Carlos Ramos. Oh Yeah! Cartoons was based on Seibert's What a Cartoon! series of shorts from Hanna-Barbera Cartoons and Cartoon Network, which brought Hanna-Barbera its first hit series in 10 years, Dexter's Laboratory, Johnny Bravo, Cow and Chicken, I Am Weasel, The Powerpuff Girls, and Courage the Cowardly Dog. Frederator has produced a total of 16 television series, and over 200 miniseries, including webisodes. As of 2013, the company was in a producing partnership with Sony Pictures Entertainment and YouTube.

In 2002, Frederator created a joint venture for preschoolers named Bolder Media with producer Susan Miller's Mixed Media Group, Inc. They produced their first preschool series created by Bob Boyle for Nick Jr., Wow! Wow! Wubbzy!.

Frederator Studios created a television series and competition The Nicktoons Film Festival (now known as the Nicktoons Network Animation Festival) for the Nicktoons Network, which debuted October 24, 2004.

In 2004, David Karp interned at Frederator Studios at its first Manhattan location, and built their first blogging platform. In 2007, he launched Tumblr from a rented desk at Frederator Studios' Park Avenue South offices, with chief engineer Marco Arment. Seibert was one of Tumblr's first bloggers.

On November 1, 2005, Frederator launched what it called "the first cartoon podcast." Named Channel Frederator by David Karp (who also structured and edited the initial episodes), this weekly animation network features submitted films from around the world, and quickly became one of the top video podcasts on Apple Inc.'s iTunes. In quick succession, The Wubbcast was launched for pre-schoolers in January 2006, and ReFrederator featuring vintage public domain cartoons in April 2006. Channel Frederator became the model for Seibert's media company Next New Networks and reaches almost 4,000,000 video views monthly.

On June 25, 2007 Variety article announced the studio had formed Frederator Films, dedicated to creating animated feature films budgeted under $20 million. Frederator's first feature is set up at Paramount Pictures, co-produced with J. J. Abrams' Bad Robot. They have also set up their first two animated features in a first look production arrangement for Sony Pictures Animation.

=== Expansion into web animation ===
The studio produced its first original internet cartoons with independent animator Dan Meth. The Meth Minute 39 launched on September 5, 2007, featuring 39 of Meth's original character shorts. (The first cartoon was "Internet People", a video on the viral video sites YouTube and MySpaceTV that featured some popular Internet memes and internet people.) A spin-off, Nite Fite, debuted in October 2008. These series have totaled over 35,000,000 video views to date.

Random! Cartoons, the latest Frederator anthology series, began airing on Nicktoons in 2009; it spawned two TV series, Fanboy & Chum Chum and Adventure Time (the first Frederator production not for Nickelodeon and the first and only series made for Cartoon Network), as well as the web series, Bravest Warriors.

Frederator Studios became a division of parent Frederator Networks when founder Fred Seibert announced the company's new YouTube funded channel and adult production label, Cartoon Hangover in February 2012 and 18 months later started the Channel Frederator Network, a multi-channel network (MCN) dedicated to helping individual YouTube animation creators distribute and monetize their owned and operated channels. At launch, Frederator produced three animated series for Cartoon Hangover: Bravest Warriors, created by Pendleton Ward; SuperFuckers, created by James Kochalka; and Too Cool! Cartoons, an incubator featuring content from different animators. Bravest Warriors premiered on November 8, 2012 and SuperFuckers premiered on November 30, 2012.

In July 2013 as part of Too Cool! Cartoons Cartoon Hangover premiered the first part of the 10-minute short film, Bee and PuppyCat created by Natasha Allegri. Due to its popularity, in November 2013 Frederator launched a Kickstarter to fund a first season of the series, which was successful and raised $872,133 toward more episodes of the show. The project was the most funded animation and web series Kickstarter at the conclusion, and the fourth most-funded Film/Video project.

In 2013, Frederator launched a digital-only ebook company, Frederator Books. Frederator Books published its first title, "The Lieography of Babe Ruth" in March 2013.

In 2014, Frederator announced the launch of The Channel Frederator Network, a Multi Channel Network (MCN) of independently owned animation channels on YouTube. Since its start, Channel Frederator Network has generated more than one billion views, and averages more than 30 million views a month, across its network of more than 200 channels. Some of its leading channels are FilmCow (just over 1 million subscribers), Cartoon Hangover (over 1 million subscribers), and Simon's Cat (over 2,800,000 subscribers), which is YouTube's #2 animated channel. Once part of the network, Frederator handles all advertising and distribution for its channels on YouTube, promoting the show and its licensed merchandise.

As of 2016, Mexican animation studio Ánima Estudios and Frederator Studios have launched a new YouTube network, called Átomo Network, focusing on Spanish-language content.

=== Acquisition by Rainmaker; Wow Unlimited merger, and Kartoon Studios ownership ===
In December 2016, Canadian studio Rainmaker Entertainment (now, and originally known as, Mainframe) acquired Frederator Networks. Together with Ezrin Hirsh Entertainment (EHE), the three would be merged into the holding company Wow Unlimited Media, Inc.

In August 2020, it was announced Fred Seibert would resign as CEO of Frederator Studios. Michael Hirsh, co-founder of Canadian studio Nelvana, would take over.

On October 27, 2021, Genius Brands International (now Kartoon Studios) announced that it had agreed to acquire Wow Unlimited Media for C$66 million (US$53 million), with the transaction is expected to close in the first quarter of 2022. The acquisition was completed on April 7, 2022.

In January 2023, 50% of the rights to Bravest Warriors and Bee and PuppyCat was sold to Toho International.

== Filmography ==
=== Television series ===
For Nickelodeon:

- Oh Yeah! Cartoons (1998–2002) (co-produced with Nickelodeon Animation Studio)
- The Fairly OddParents (2001–2017) (co-produced with Nickelodeon Animation Studio and Billionfold Inc. for seasons 6–10)
- ChalkZone (2002–2008) (co-produced with Nickelodeon Animation Studio)
- My Life as a Teenage Robot (2003–2009) (co-produced with Nickelodeon Animation Studio)
- Fanboy & Chum Chum (2009–2014) (co-produced with Nickelodeon Animation Studio)

For Nicktoons:

- Nicktoons Film Festival (2004–2009) (co-produced with Nickelodeon Animation Studio)
- Random! Cartoons (2008–2009) (co-produced with Nickelodeon Animation Studio)
- Ape Escape (2009) (co-produced with Hawaii Film Partners, Project 51 Productions and Showcase Entertainment)

For Nick Jr.:

- Wow! Wow! Wubbzy! (2006–2010) (co-produced with Starz Media, credited as Bolder Media)

For Netflix:

- Castlevania (2017–2021) (co-produced with Powerhouse Animation, Warren Ellis Productions for seasons 3–4, Shankar Animation and Project 51 Productions)
- Bee and PuppyCat: Lazy in Space (2022) (co-produced with OLM, Inc.)

For HBO Max:

- Adventure Time: Distant Lands (2020–2021) (co-produced with Cartoon Network Studios)
- Adventure Time: Fionna and Cake (2023–present) (co-produced with Cartoon Network Studios for season 1)

Other productions

- Adventure Time (2010–2018) (co-produced with Cartoon Network Studios for Cartoon Network)
- Bravest Warriors (2017–2018) (co-produced with Nelvana for Teletoon)
- Costume Quest (2019) (co-produced with Wellsville Pictures, Double Fine Productions and Amazon Studios for Amazon Prime Video)

=== YouTube series ===
Channel Frederator:

- The Meth Minute 39 (September 5, 2007)
- Cartoon Conspiracy (April 24, 2014)

Cartoon Hangover:

- Bravest Warriors (November 8, 2012)
- SuperFuckers (November 30, 2012)
- Too Cool! Cartoons (April 4, 2013)
- Bee and PuppyCat (November 6, 2014)
- Go! Cartoons (November 7, 2017)

=== Films ===
- Globehunters: An Around the World in 80 Days Adventure (2002, produced in 2000) (co-produced with Nickelodeon Animation Studio)
- The Electric Piper (2003, produced in 2000) (co-produced with Nickelodeon Animation Studio)
- Abra-Catastrophe! (2003) (co-produced with Nickelodeon Animation Studio)
- Channel Chasers (2004) (co-produced with Nickelodeon Animation Studio)
- The Jimmy Timmy Power Hour (2004/2006) (co-produced with O Entertainment, DNA Productions, and Nickelodeon Animation Studio, the crossover three-part special with The Adventures of Jimmy Neutron, Boy Genius)
- School's Out!: The Musical (2005) (co-produced with Nickelodeon Animation Studio)
- Escape from Cluster Prime (2005) (co-produced with Nickelodeon Animation Studio)
- Wubbzy's Big Movie! (2008) (co-produced with Starz Media, credited as Bolder Media)
- Wubb Idol (2009) (co-produced with Starz Media, credited as Bolder Media)
- Wishology! (2009) (co-produced with Billionfold, Inc. and Nickelodeon Animation Studio)
- A Fairly Odd Movie: Grow Up, Timmy Turner! (2011) (co-produced with Billionfold, Inc. and Pacific Bay Entertainment)
- A Fairly Odd Christmas (2012) (co-produced with Billionfold, Inc. and Pacific Bay Entertainment)
- A Fairly Odd Summer (2014) (co-produced with Billionfold, Inc. and Pacific Bay Entertainment)

== See also ==
- Mainframe Studios
- Kartoon Studios
