= Cartoon Hangover =

Internet animation channel

- Network: YouTube

Programming
- Language: English
- Picture format: 1080p

Ownership
- Owner: Channel Frederator Network (Frederator Networks, Inc.)

History
- Launched: February 21, 2012; 14 years ago

Availability

Streaming media
- YouTube channel: CartoonHangover

Cartoon Hangover is a Frederator-operated YouTube channel and adult animation brand that launched in February 2012 as part of the YouTube Original Channel Initiative. The channel (along with Cartoon Hangover 2, Cartoon Hangover FRA, Cartoon Hangover ESP, Cartoon Hangover DEU, Cartoon Hangover POR, Cartoon Hangover NED, Cartoon Hangover ITA, and Cartoon Hangover Uncensored) is part of the Channel Frederator Network.

Frederator produced two animated series exclusively for the Internet: Bravest Warriors, created by Pendleton Ward and Bee and PuppyCat, created by Natasha Allegri. Previously, they produced SuperFuckers, created by James Kochalka. Cartoon Hangover would also host Frederator's fifth and sixth cartoon short incubators: Too Cool! Cartoons, which was planned to feature 39 shorts but ended up releasing only 11 shorts, and GO! Cartoons, a joint venture with Sony Pictures Animation that launched on November 7, 2017.

Cartoon Hangover was previously available on VRV (as "Cartoon Hangover Select") until December 2021. The YouTube channel would be inactive from 2019 until 2022, when a new trailer for Bee and PuppyCat: Lazy in Space was uploaded on August 12.

On May 11, 2023, Frederator launched the Cartoon Hangover Shots incubator program.

== Programming ==
=== Bravest Warriors ===
Bravest Warriors is an American animated series created by Pendleton Ward and directed by Breehn Burns. Fred Seibert, Burns, and Will McRobb and Chris Viscardi serve as the series' executive producers. The series follows four warriors, Chris, Beth, Danny and Wallow as they travel across space, performing various acts of bravery. The series was launched on Cartoon Hangover's YouTube channel on November 8, 2012.

The series is based on a pilot episode which originally aired as part of Random! Cartoons on Nicktoons in January 2009. The series has been dubbed in Spanish. Season 2 features several guest writers, including Invader Zim creator Jhonen Vasquez, Dinosaur Comics creator Ryan North, and creator of Nimona and She-Ra and the Princesses of Power, ND Stevenson. In February 2013, Robert Lloyd of the Los Angeles Times called Bravest Warriors his "favorite thing on the planet." The series ran for 4 seasons, but it is unknown if it will have a 5th season. On December 3, 2019, popular character Catbug will receive a spinoff series.

=== SuperF*ckers ===
SuperF*ckers is an American adult animated series created by James Kochalka and directed by Fran Krause. Based on the comic of the same name, the series was launched on Cartoon Hangover's YouTube channel on YouTube on November 30, 2012. The series also features an uncensored version. The series ran until 2013.

=== Hungover With Cade ===
Hungover With Cade is a bi-weekly show hosted by YouTuber Cade Hiser that featured updates and sneak peeks about upcoming Cartoon Hangover cartoons, merchandise, and events. The series ended after 34 episodes.

=== Bee and PuppyCat ===
Bee and PuppyCat is an American animated series created and written by Natasha Allegri, and directed by Larry Leichliter. Fred Seibert serves as the series' executive producer, with producers Kevin Kolde and Eric Homan, as well Allegri co-producing the series. The series revolves around Bee (voiced by Allyn Rachel), an unemployed slacker, when suddenly she encounters a mysterious creature called PuppyCat (voiced by the Vocaloid program Oliver). She adopts this apparent cat-dog hybrid, and together they go on an intergalactic babysitting gig to pay her monthly rent.

=== Fin Punch ===
Fin Punch was an English dub of the 2012 Chilean series Personas Cetaceas which was created by Matias Latorre and animated by Marmota Studio. It is set in a world where humans and sea mammals co-exist. The series ran for eighteen episodes and ended on a cliffhanger. The English dub ran from February 5, 2015, to April 7, 2015, on Cartoon Hangover.

=== Nite Fite ===
Originating as a skit on The Meth Minute 39 in 2007, the series was originally on Channel Frederator and ran for 22 episodes. It is available for streaming on Cartoon Hangover Select.

=== Too Cool! Cartoons ===
Too Cool! Cartoons was a cartoon anthology which featured several cartoon shorts. Of the eleven shorts produced, Bee and PuppyCat, Dead End and Rocket Dog, were picked up to be produced as full series. However, as of 2020, no further information on Rocket Dog was given since its initial announcement back in 2015 other than Frederator Studios and Studio Moshi were going to produce it.

- Our New Electrical Morals: created by Mike Rosenthal, directed by Kenny Pittenger (April 4, 2013)
- Rocket Dog: created by Mel Roach (May 2, 2013)
- Ace Discovery: created by Tom Gran and Martin Woolley (May 30, 2013)
- Bee and PuppyCat: created by Natasha Allegri (July 11, 2013; August 9, 2013)
- Doctor Lollipop: created by Kelly Martin, directed by Aliki Grafft (September 12, 2013)
- Dead End: created by Hamish Steele (June 26, 2014)
- Chainsaw Richard: created by Chris Reineman (July 17, 2014)
- Manly: created by Jesse Moynihan and Justin Moynihan (July 31, 2014)
- SpaceBear: created by Andy Helms (August 14, 2014)
- Blackford Manor: created by Jiwook Kim (August 28, 2014)

=== Super Science Friends ===
Super Science Friends is a Canadian series produced by Tinman Creative. The Super Science Friends are a team of heroes who are also scientific historical figures. It was added to Cartoon Hangover Select on March 14, 2017.

=== Ape Escape ===
Ape Escape is a 2009 Western animated adaptation of the Ape Escape franchise. It is available for streaming on Cartoon Hangover Select.

=== GO! Cartoons ===
GO! Cartoons is a 12-episode cartoon anthology series which is jointly produced by Frederator Studios and Sony Pictures Animation. As with Frederator's previous cartoon "incubators", the shorts produced act as pilots for potential full series on Cartoon Hangover or other platforms. It was originally planned to launch in Fall 2015, but eventually premiered on November 7, 2017, and can be seen on both Cartoon Hangover's YouTube and VRV channels.

=== (not)Hero ===
(not)Hero is an miniseries created by Liz Chun about a reluctant hero. It was released on Cartoon Hangover Select on February 9, 2018 (originally December 4, 2017). It became available on the Cartoon Hangover YouTube channel on June 13, 2018.

=== Shadowstone Park ===
Shadowstone Park is a miniseries created by Jason Steele (creator of Charlie the Unicorn). It premiered on December 15, 2017, on Cartoon Hangover Select.

=== Slug Riot ===
Slug Riot is a five-part miniseries created by Mike Rosenthal (creator of Our New Electrical Morals). The first episode was released on January 5, 2018, on Cartoon Hangover Select. The entire series was released on Cartoon Hangover's YouTube channel across the week of April 16, 2018.

=== Chris P. Duck ===
Chris P. Duck is a six-part miniseries created by Ralph Kidson. It premiered on March 2, 2018, on Cartoon Hangover Select. The series became available on Cartoon Hangover's YouTube channel on July 26, 2018.

=== Funny Sport Shorts ===
Funny Sport Shorts is a stop-motion animated series that premiered on Cartoon Hangover Select in July 2018.

=== The Tiniest Man in the World ===
The Tiniest Man in the World is a stop-motion animated series created by Juan Pablo Zaramella that premiered on Cartoon Hangover Select in July 2018.

=== Stan Lee's Cosmic Crusaders ===
Stan Lee's Cosmic Crusaders is an animated series created by Stan Lee that was originally released in 2016 for The Hollywood Reporter's website. The series was later uploaded to the Cartoon Hangover YouTube channel in May 2023.
