= PBS Kids Bookworm Bunch =

American preschool television block (2000–2004)

- Network: PBS Kids
- Launched: September 30, 2000; 26 years ago
- Closed: September 5, 2004; 22 years ago
- Country of origin: Canada; Hong Kong; China
- Owner: PBS; Nelvana
- Running time: 3 hours (2000–01); 2 hours (2001–04)
- Original language: English

The PBS Kids Bookworm Bunch was a Saturday morning preschool television block produced by the Canadian animation studio Nelvana that aired on PBS from September 30, 2000, until September 5, 2004. It typically aired on weekend mornings, depending on station preference and scheduling. The six animated programs that aired on the PBS Kids Bookworm Bunch were all based on children's books: Corduroy (by Don Freeman), Elliot Moose (by Andrea Beck), Timothy Goes to School (by Rosemary Wells), Seven Little Monsters (by Maurice Sendak), George Shrinks (by William Joyce), and Marvin the Tap-Dancing Horse (by Michael and Betty Paraskevas).

== History ==
In August 1999, PBS partnered with Nelvana to produce the network's first-ever animated weekend programming block. It was created to increase viewership of the preschool audience on weekends, specifically on Saturday mornings when that attention was shifted elsewhere; many PBS stations devoted their Saturday morning schedules to general audience programming, including crafting or do-it-yourself shows, meanwhile commercial networks had extensive lineups for Saturday morning cartoons. A proposed series called Junior Kroll and Company was part of original plans for the new block, but that idea was eventually canceled and replaced by Marvin the Tap-Dancing Horse. This and the other five series were all based on children's books, a theme that was inspired by a PBS-commissioned study from the University of Kansas that demonstrated the idea that children can learn to read from television programs. As part of the PBS-Nelvana agreement, PBS can place two of the shows being produced as part of this agreement onto its weekday strand. Merchandising rights for all series were handled by Nelvana while Corduroy was handled by Viacom Consumer Products and Timothy Goes to School was handled by Simple. Nelvana also held all worldwide distribution rights to all of the series being produced outside of the US.

Upon its launch on September 30, 2000, the PBS Kids Bookworm Bunch became the second preschool-oriented, Saturday morning block on broadcast television after Nick Jr. on CBS, which premiered two weeks before and replaced CBS Kidshow. Although PBS intended on the block to be broadcast on Saturdays, some stations opted to air it other days, particularly Sundays when there was less competition from other networks. The block was also broadcast on the PBS Kids Channel.

The first season of the block included six series: Corduroy, Elliot Moose, Timothy Goes to School, Seven Little Monsters, George Shrinks, and Marvin the Tap-Dancing Horse. Following the opening 15-minute Corduroy episode, each show began either 15 or 45 minutes after the hour, in an effort to discourage "channel surfing" to other competing children's animated programming. Another 15-minute Corduroy episode then ended the block, making its total runtime three hours. The PBS Kids Bookworm Bunch proved to be extremely popular in its first season, and weekend viewership increased dramatically. The first season ended on February 24, 2001, with reruns continuing until October 27, 2001.

The second season premiered on November 3, 2001, dropping Corduroy and Elliot Moose, thus shortening the block to two hours. The four remaining series (Timothy Goes to School, Marvin the Tap-Dancing Horse, Seven Little Monsters, and George Shrinks) were broadcast in traditional half-hour timeslots on the hour or half-hour. The second season ended on January 26, 2002.

Following the second season of the block, Seven Little Monsters and George Shrinks continued as standalone series, and given the success of these shows, many PBS stations carried them on their weekday schedule with new episodes starting on January 6, 2003. George Shrinks was given its own half-hour timeslot. The new episodes of Seven Little Monsters were 15 minutes in duration, instead of the original 30 minutes, and were aired immediately after The Berenstain Bears in a shared half-hour timeslot. However, several months later, Seven Little Monsters was dropped and PBS aired two 15-minute episodes of The Berenstain Bears back-to-back beginning on September 15, 2003.

Reruns of the second season of the PBS Kids Bookworm Bunch block continued airing on weekends on select PBS stations and the PBS Kids Channel through September 5, 2004. Many new programs were coming to the schedule around this time, most notably Thomas & Friends and Bob the Builder, as well as the new early-elementary block, PBS Kids Go! These new additions effectively replaced the PBS Kids Bookworm Bunch. However, many PBS stations continued airing reruns of the individual standalone series on the weekday lineup, including Seven Little Monsters until the end of 2004, George Shrinks until 2009, and The Berenstain Bears until September 8, 2025.

After the PBS Kids Bookworm Bunch block was discontinued, most of the series (with the exception of Corduroy) aired on other commercial networks internationally. In the United States, cable channel Discovery Kids aired reruns of Timothy Goes to School from 2004 until 2006, and Ion's 24-hour Qubo channel aired reruns of Elliot Moose, Timothy Goes to School, and Marvin the Tap-Dancing Horse as part of its daily programming. In Canada, BBC Kids aired reruns of George Shrinks until its closure on December 31, 2018, and YTV formerly aired reruns of Seven Little Monsters until 2005. The UK channel Tiny Pop aired reruns of Timothy Goes to School until 2017.

== Interstitial music videos ==
Music videos aired at the end of each program before the credits. These music videos featured scenes from all of the shows with musical accompaniment. Each of the songs was performed by American children's music artist Nancy Cassidy, appearing on three KidsSongs albums released between 1986 and 1992 by Klutz (purchased by Nelvana in April 2000).

=== Season 1 (2000–2001) ===
- Corduroy (first half) – "Boom, Boom, Ain't It Great to Be Crazy?" (shortened version) (Appears on the 1986 album KidsSongs 2)
- Elliot Moose – "You Gotta Sing" (Appears on the 1986 album KidsSongs)
- Timothy Goes to School – "Rig a Jig Jig" (Appears on KidsSongs 2)
- Seven Little Monsters – "La Bamba" (shortened version; Appears on KidsSongs 2)
- George Shrinks – "You Gotta Sing" (reprise)
- Marvin the Tap-Dancing Horse – "Rig a Jig Jig" (reprise)
- Corduroy (second half) – "Skidamarink" (Appears on the 1992 album KidsSongs: Sleepyheads)

=== Season 2 (2001–2002) ===
- Timothy Goes to School – "Friends Are Special" (Appears on KidsSongs: Sleepyheads)
- Marvin the Tap-Dancing Horse – "La Bamba" (extended version)
- Seven Little Monsters – "This Little Light of Mine" (Appears on KidsSongs)
- George Shrinks – "Boom, Boom, Ain't It Great to Be Crazy?" (extended version)

== Programming ==
=== Former programming ===
==== Original programming ====
The first season (2000–2001) of the PBS Kids Bookworm Bunch block ran for three hours, and the second season (2001–2002) ran for two hours.

Title	Premiere date	End date	Notes	Source(s)
Corduroy	September 30, 2000	October 27, 2001		
Elliot Moose	September 30, 2000	October 27, 2001		
Timothy Goes to School	September 30, 2000	September 5, 2004		
Seven Little Monsters	September 30, 2000	September 5, 2004		
George Shrinks	September 30, 2000	September 5, 2004		
Marvin the Tap-Dancing Horse	September 30, 2000	September 5, 2004		

==== Standalone programming ====
The most successful series from the weekend PBS Kids Bookworm Bunch block aired separately five days a week, and joined Berenstain Bears as standalone programs.

Title	Premiere date	End date	Notes	Source(s)
Berenstain Bears & Seven Little Monsters (Note: One 11-minute episode of The Berenstain Bears and one 11-minute episode of Seven Little Monsters packaged within a half-hour timeslot.)	January 6, 2003	September 14, 2003	Reruns of this 30-minute program continued on select stations until 2004.	
George Shrinks	January 6, 2003	January 23, 2003	Reruns continued on select stations until 2009.	
The Berenstain Bears (Note: Two 11-minute episodes of The Berenstain Bears packaged within a half-hour time slot.)	September 15, 2003	September 10, 2004	Reruns continued on select stations until 2025.	
