= Corduroy (disambiguation) =

Corduroy is a woven fabric.

Corduroy may also refer to:

- "Corduroy" (song), a 1994 song by Pearl Jam
- "Corduroy", a 1990 song by The Wedding Present from the 3 Songs EP and the album Seamonsters
- Corduroy (band), a London-based acid jazz band
- Corduroy (book), a children's book by Don Freeman
  - Corduroy (TV series), a PBS animated television show
- Corduroy road, or log road, a type of road
- Snow grooming, manipulated snow pattern known as corduroy
