= Ferocious beast =

Ferocious Beast may refer to:

== Beasts, characters, people, mythology ==
- Monster
- Wild animal
- Bestial beast or ferocious beast, the folkloric Brazilian centaur
- Beast of Gévaudan, a.k.a. "la bette féroce" ("the ferocious beast"), a man-eating beast that terrorized late-18th-century Francec
- Beast of Bladenboro, a.k.a. "the ferocious beast", a man-eating beast that terrorized mid-20th-century North Carolina, USA
- The Ferocious Beast, a pet-eating wolf that terrorized late-18th-century Lombardy, Italy; see Folklore of Italy
- Beast (a.k.a. "Ferocious Beast"), a character from the animated Canadian TV show Maggie and the Ferocious Beast

== Other uses ==
- The Ferocious Beast, a children's book series by Michael Paraskevas, the basis of the TV show Maggie and the Ferocious Beast
  - The Ferocious Beast with the Polka-Dot Hide, the first book in the Ferocious Beast book series by Michael Paraskevas

== See also ==
- Beast (disambiguation)
