= List of Maggie and the Ferocious Beast episodes =

Maggie and the Ferocious Beast is a Canadian animated children's television series created by Michael and Betty Paraskevas. The program was based on the 1996 book The Ferocious Beast with the Polka-Dot Hide and its sequels. The series originally aired on Teletoon in Canada.

== Series overview ==
Season	Episodes	Originally released	
Season	Episodes	First released	Last released
1	13	August 26, 2000	September 7, 2000
2	13	April 7, 2001	October 7, 2001
3	13	March 9, 2002	June 9, 2002

== Shorts (1998) ==
A series of five shorts was made in 1998, and predated the television series itself by two years.

Short no.	Title	Original air date (Teletoon)
1	"The Big Sneeze"	1998
The Beast sneezes his spots off after sniffing flowers, nearly blowing Maggie and Hamilton away.
2	"Move to the Moosic"	1998
The trio discovers "Mooville," a land of singing cows.
3	"Beach Ball Bonanza"	1998
Beast cannot play with beach balls without popping them, so Maggie gives him some socks to cover his horns.
4	"Song for a Sunset"	1998
As they are watching the sunset, Maggie and her friends make a poem about it.
5	"The Really Ferocious Beast"	1998
The Beast wants to show Maggie and Hamilton how ferocious he really is.

== Episodes ==
=== Season 1 (2000) ===
No. overall	No. in season	Title	Original air date (Teletoon)	U.S. air date
1	1	"Pack Up Your Troubles/Rub a Dub Dub/The Big Carrot"	August 29, 2000	June 7, 2000
Maggie, Hamilton and the Beast are all having an unsettling day, so they decide to send their troubles away, until they find good uses for them. The Beast has to take a bath after playing in the mud. Maggie, Hamilton and the Beast meet a rabbit named Nedley and help him pull out his gigantic carrot. Note: The Big Carrot was later adapted into a storybook.
2	2	"My One and Only Box/Spot the Spot/Recipe for Trouble"	August 26, 2000	June 6, 2000
Hamilton uses his box as a sled. Maggie, Hamilton and the Beast try to count the Beast's spots. Hamilton wants to try a new pumpkin recipe. While Maggie and the Beast get the other ingredients, Hamilton gets stuck in a giant pumpkin while digging it up.
3	3	"The Lemonade Stand/Walk the Walk/What's in a Laugh?"	August 27, 2000	June 5, 2000
Maggie, Hamilton and the Beast have a lemonade stand, but no customers walk by. Meanwhile, the Beast fakes an injury so he can get a bandage like Maggie's. While at the beach, Maggie, Hamilton and Hamilton try to walk like Sidestep the Crab, but Beast ends up ruining Sidestep's house so they make him a new one out of sand. When the Beast says that Hamilton snorts when he laughs, Hamilton is furious and stays in his box until Maggie suggests making paper hats.
4	4	"Out of Water Beast/Rain, Rain, Come and Stay!/Hamilton the Ham"	August 29, 2000	June 8, 2000
On a hot day, Maggie, Hamilton and the Beast are too tired to go to the beach, so Hamilton gets out a wading pool, but the Beast is too big to fit in it. Maggie, Hamilton and the Beast go to the Land of Umbrella Trees and one of the Beast's galoshes ends up stuck in a big puddle. While on a trip to Mooville, Maggie and the Beast dance to the music, but Hamilton cannot dance so he sings instead.
5	5	"This Little Pig/Hide and Go Beast/One, Two, Three"	August 30, 2000	June 9, 2000
Hamilton gets a cold, so Maggie and the Beast try to make him feel better. After bothering him repeatedly, they decide to write him a poem. Maggie and Hamilton try to find the Beast during a game of hide-and-seek. After many failed attempts, they decide to have hot chocolate, but the Beast smells it and decides to come out of his hiding place. Maggie, Hamilton and the Beast take care of Maggie's triplet cousins.
6	6	"What's In The Bag?/Beastly Picture/The Push-Me Popper"	August 31, 2000	June 12, 2000
Maggie packs a picnic for Beast and Hamilton, but a group of jelly beans she brought for dessert are quarreling over which of them is better. When the Beast accidentally ruins Maggie's painting of him, he tries to make another one, but it doesn't end up being a what he thought it would be. However, Maggie ends up liking the painting. The Beast accidentally breaks Hamilton's new push-me popper and Hamilton, who blames the Beast for breaking the new toy, is upset.
7	7	"Sun Spots/Say Cheese/Sailing Away"	September 1, 2000	June 13, 2000
Maggie, Beast, and Hamilton go to the beach but the Beast, who forgot to put on sunscreen, ends up with a sunburn, causing Maggie and Hamilton to predict there is a sea monster. When Maggie gives a framed picture of her and the Beast to him, Hamilton is sad when he finds out that he wasn't in the picture. After a talk with Maggie, Beast takes a picture of them. Maggie, the Beast, and Hamilton journey in a giant paper boat to discover a secret island.
8	8	"Three Little Ghosts/The King of Nowhere Land/The Big Scare"	September 2, 2000	June 14, 2000
Maggie, Hamilton and the Beast all dress up as ghosts to scare each other and they come across a fourth ghost, who is revealed to be Nedley. Hamilton wants to play King of Nowhere Land, but finds out that being king is boring. Maggie and Hamilton find the Beast afraid. He reveals that he is afraid of mice and he encounters Pippy (Rudy), who is also afraid of the Beast too. Luckily, the Beast and Pippy get to know each other and become friends.
9	9	"Hamilton's Pet/Slooow Motion/The Big Duck"	September 3, 2000	September 3, 2001
When Maggie, Hamilton and the Beast go fishing, Hamilton catches a fish and decides to keep it as a pet, but after seeing how glum the fish is, Hamilton decides to put him back in the river. During a game of Follow the Leader, Maggie, Hamilton and the Beast discover a turtle beach and decide to play Follow the Turtle. Maggie, Hamilton and the Beast come across a big duck who keeps following them and it turns out that the duck wants to give them a ride across the river.
10	10	"Flim-Flam-A Fiddle/A Beastly Garden/Spring Cleaning"	September 4, 2000	September 4, 2001
The Beast wins at checkers and Hamilton wins at croquet, so Maggie comes up with a game where there are zero winners or losers. When Maggie brings a watermelon to the Beast and Hamilton, the Beast decides to plant a watermelon garden. When Hamilton says that cleaning is fun, Maggie and the Beast try it, but they find out that it's boring.
11	11	"Mr. Shivers/Nap Time/Up, Up, and Away"	September 5, 2000	September 5, 2001
Maggie brings a magic snow globe that makes it snow when you shake it and She, Beast, and Hamilton make a snowman, which comes alive. Maggie, Hamilton and the Beast decide to take a nap, but have trouble falling asleep. On a windy day, Maggie, Hamilton and the Beast make a kite.
12	12	"Louder! Louder!/Once Upon a Time/Maggie the Mommy"	September 6, 2000	September 6, 2001
Maggie, Hamilton and the Beast play an echoing game and after doing a loud roar, the Beast loses his voice. Maggie, Hamilton and the Beast act out their favorite story, but they tell it differently. Maggie, Hamilton and the Beast play a game where Maggie is a mommy, Hamilton is her baby and the Beast is their dog.
13	13	"Hamilton's Box Car/Happy Birthday to All of Us/The Really Big Show"	September 7, 2000	September 7, 2001
Hamilton makes a race car, but he has trouble driving it and breaks it to smithereens. It's Maggie, Hamilton and the Beast's birthday, so the trio decides to celebrate their parties all at once. Maggie, Hamilton and the Beast put on a show where Hamilton does a magic trick, Maggie reads a poem and the Beast does an exotic dance with Sidestep's help.

=== Season 2 (2001) ===
No. overall	No. in season	Title	Original air date (Teletoon)	U.S. air date
14	1	"Hamilton Blows His Horn/The Big Cheese/Roll Over Archie"	April 7, 2001	January 7, 2002
Hamilton discovers a trombone, so he tries to play it, which was difficult. After realizing that he can't play, Maggie, the Beast and Rudy remind Hamilton about his singing. Maggie, Hamilton and the Beast take care of Rudy when he injures his leg and can't walk. Maggie, Hamilton and the Beast meet a Scottish dog toy named Archie. Note: Starting in this episode, Pippy's name is changed to Rudy.
15	2	"Desert Treasure/Morning in Nowhere Land/The Missing Sweater"	April 8, 2001	January 8, 2002
Maggie, Hamilton and the Beast journey through the desert to find a treasure. Along the way, they are very thirsty and meet a camel named Kalee, who takes them to a beautiful lemonade spring oasis. The Beast and Hamilton go through their morning routines before Maggie arrives. Hamilton lends Nedley his sweater, but Nedley doesn't want to give it back. Note: “Morning in Nowhere Land” is the only episode without dialogue.
16	3	"Just a Little Off the Top/Little Pig Lost/The Cecil Bunions Detective Agency"	April 21, 2001	January 9, 2002
Maggie opens up a barbershop for the Beast, Hamilton, Nedley, and Rudy. Hamilton floats away on balloons and gets lost, so Maggie and the Beast search everywhere for him. Maggie, Hamilton and the Beast become detectives after getting their Cecil Bunions detective badges. Note: Cecil Bunions is a reference to the book Cecil Bunions and the Midnight Train by Michael and Betty Paraskevas, the creators of Maggie and the Ferocious Beast.
17	4	"The Jelly Bean Express/Let's Play Croquet/Little Ducky"	April 22, 2001	January 10, 2002
Maggie, Hamilton and the Beast build a train for the Jellybean Team. The Jellybeans like it so much, but are fed up with going around in circles. So Maggie, Hamilton and the Beast decide to extend the train set to the beach. Maggie, Hamilton and the Beast play croquet, but Maggie and Hamilton lose their balls. Maggie, Hamilton and the Beast take care of a big baby duck after its egg hatched.
18	5	"Don't Dump That Junk/Soup Bowls and Roller Coasters/Rainy Day"	April 29, 2001	January 11, 2002
Maggie, Hamilton and the Beast play a game where they use a piece of junk to make them laugh. Maggie, Hamilton, the Beast and Rudy go to an amusement park, but Hamilton is nervously anxious to ride the roller coaster, so Hamilton rides in a spinning soup bowl. During a bad storm, Hamilton's box washes away in a flood.
19	6	"Guess Who's Coming to Visit/The Lonesome Traveler/The Home of the Kindly Giant"	June 10, 2001	January 14, 2002
The Beast's cousin, Reggie Von Beast, comes to visit, but Reggie turns out to be annoying and rude. Maggie and Hamilton are too busy knitting, so Beast travels on his own and comes across Turkey Town, but the turkeys won't leave him alone. Maggie, Hamilton and the Beast take the triplets to the Kindly Giant's garden, but the triplets keep wandering away.
20	7	"The Funny Smile/Guess Who I Am/House for a Mouse"	June 17, 2001	January 15, 2002
The Beast loses a tooth and thinks his smile is unsettling. The Beast keeps mimicking Hamilton so Maggie decides to play a game where they pretend to be one of their friends. Hamilton makes a gingerbread house for Rudy, but he ends up eating it.
21	8	"Nothing in the Beach Ball/Picnic Time/The New Rubber Ball"	September 8, 2001	January 16, 2002
Maggie, Hamilton and the Beast go to the beach ball factory where they find out that there's no air in them, so they enlist the help of Nedley, who works there, to find out what's wrong. Maggie, Hamilton and the Beast have a picnic but a colony of ants bother them, so they make them their own little picnic. The Beast gets a new rubber ball and tries to take extra care of it, but he later decides to give it to the triplets as their new birthday present.
22	9	"Ride 'Em Cowboy!/Right Next Door/Hamilton's Sailboat"	September 9, 2001	January 17, 2002
Maggie, Hamilton, the Beast, Nedley, Rudy and the Jellybean Team discover a cowboy village. There, they encounter a strange villain who needs a bath. Later, they celebrate by doing a square dance. The Beast wants a house of his own, so Maggie gives him his own door. Hamilton takes Maggie and the Beast sailing on his new sailboat.
23	10	"The Big Hat/The Camping Trip/The Leaning Tower of Carrot"	September 16, 2001	August 26, 2002
Hamilton makes a restaurant out of the Kindly Giant's hat until he gets caught. Maggie, Hamilton and the Beast attend a camping trip. The Beast accidentally tilts Nedley's carrot birdhouse so he, Maggie and Hamilton get a potato from the Kindly Giant's garden to prop it back up.
24	11	"Catch Me If You Can/Strings, Pumpkins, and Hats/The Missing Bass"	September 23, 2001	January 18, 2002
Maggie, Hamilton and the Beast make gingerbread man cookies, but they run away to the tall grass, making it difficult for Maggie, Hamilton and the Beast to find them. So they decide to make them a new home. Hamilton holds a contest for his friends to see who has the best collection, but everyone votes for themselves. Hamilton comes across a bass and thinks it's the Kindly Giant's violin, but it's revealed that it belongs to a jazzy cat named B.B. Katz
25	12	"Message In a Bottle/A Visit to Cake Town/Hamilton's Important Letter"	September 30, 2001	March 22, 2002
Hamilton takes Maggie and the Beast on a treasure hunt. Maggie, Hamilton, the Beast and Rudy visit Cake Town, but they get carried away and end up with stomachaches when they eat too much sweets. Hamilton finds out that the “H” symbol on his sweater is missing so Maggie and the Beast help him find it. In the end, it's revealed that Hamilton had his sweater on inside out.
26	13	"The Snow Show/School Days/The Nowhere Land Day Parade"	October 7, 2001	April 19, 2002
Maggie, Hamilton, the Beast and all of the Nowhere Land Residents go ice skating. Maggie, Hamilton, the Beast, Nedley and Rudy play school. Maggie, Hamilton and the Beast decide to put on a parade for Nowhere Land Day. Note: Only the singing parts are active in “The Snow Show”.

=== Season 3 (2002) ===
No. overall	No. in season	Title	Original air date (Teletoon)	U.S. air date
27	1	"The Beast and the Balloon/The Beast's Big Surprise/Land of the Antique Toys"	March 9, 2002	September 23, 2003
Maggie, Hamilton and the Beast go on a hot air balloon ride, but Maggie and Hamilton soon learn that the Beast is too scared of heights. The Beast decides to make his famous pancakes, to Maggie and Hamilton's dismay. Maggie, Hamilton and the Beast visit the Land of Antique Toys where they revisit Archie and meet other toys.
28	2	"Maggie's Song/The Buffle-Headed Booby/Hamilton and the Bee"	March 10, 2002	September 24, 2003
Hamilton, the Beast, Rudy and B.B. decide to sing a song for Maggie. Hamilton takes Maggie and the Beast bird watching to find a rare bird. They find him, but he doesn't like his name so they try to find another name for him. Beast comes up with Howard, which the bird likes. Hamilton dresses up like a bee to borrow honey for his tea party.
29	3	"Go to Sleep, Sheep/The Missing Spot/Blue Moon"	March 17, 2002	September 15, 2003
Maggie, Hamilton and the Beast try to help a dream sheep fall asleep. When the Jellybean Team steal one of Beast's spots, Maggie, Hamilton and the Beast use their Cecil Bunions detective badges to find it. Hamilton plants a beanstalk and climbs it where he, B.B. and the Moo Sisters sing a song for the moon. Note: “Blue Moon” is the only episode where Maggie is mentioned.
30	4	"The Beached Whale/A Flag for Nowhere Land/Desert Cactus"	March 24, 2002	September 25, 2003
A panicky Sidestep enlists Maggie, Hamilton, and the Beast's help when a baby whale washes up on the beach. Maggie, Hamilton and the Beast make a flag for Nowhere Land. Maggie, Hamilton and the Beast journey to the desert to visit Callie where they see a cactus following them.
31	5	"The Invitation/Trick or Treat/The Trade Off"	March 31, 2002	October 31, 2003
Nedley has a dinner party and thinks it's going to be fancy because of the formal invitations. It's Halloween in Nowhere Land, so Maggie, Hamilton and the Beast go trick-or-treating. Hamilton trades his kazoo for Nedley's yo-yo, but when the yo-yo is broken, Hamilton tries his best to get his kazoo back.
32	6	"Hamilton's Magic/Nedley's Circus/Chasing a Rainbow"	April 7, 2002	September 26, 2003
The Beast thinks one of Hamilton's magic tricks went wrong. When Nedley announces that he's joining the circus, Maggie, Hamilton, the Beast, Rudy, and the Jellybean Team put on their own circus for Nedley to stay. Maggie, Hamilton and the Beast try to see where a rainbow ends and they come across Mud Creek, B.B.'s hometown.
33	7	"The Ice Cream Cart/That's A-Mazing!/The Humongous Fungus"	April 14, 2002	September 16, 2003
Maggie, Hamilton, the Beast and Rudy try to make homemade ice cream, but they realize that they don't have ice. So they travel to Highest Mountain to borrow ice from Mr. Shivers. Maggie, Hamilton, the Beast and Rudy get lost in a hedge maze so the Kindly Giant helps them. Maggie, Hamilton and the Beast travel to find a giant mushroom called the Humongous Fungus.
34	8	"The Big Hole/Oh Give Me a Home/Which Way Did They Go?"	April 21, 2002	September 29, 2003
Maggie, Hamilton, the Beast and Rudy dig a giant hole. Sidestep is upset when his sandcastle is washed away, so Maggie, Hamilton, the Beast and Rudy build him a new sandcastle. Maggie, Hamilton, the Beast and Rudy try to find the triplets after they took off in their paddle car.
35	9	"Blast Off/Hamilton's Hat/The Wish Fish"	April 28, 2002	September 19, 2003
Maggie, Hamilton and the Beast pretend to blast off to Mars. Hamilton refuses to take off his favorite hat. Maggie, Hamilton and the Beast meet a fish in the well who grants wishes.
36	10	"Rudy, Rudy, Rudy/Friendship Day/The Contraption"	May 5, 2002	September 30, 2003
Rudy discovers a coconut fallen from a tree and tries to open it, but it is too heavy and Rudy gets washed away after many failed attempts. So Maggie, Hamilton and the Beast rescue him before he goes too far. Maggie, Hamilton and the Beast have a Friendship Day party, but the Beast sends cards to himself. Hamilton has Maggie and the Beast borrow items from their friends to make his contraption.
37	11	"The Chicken Ladies/Nedley Needs a Box/Tag-Along Reggie"	May 26, 2002	September 22, 2003
Maggie, Hamilton and the Beast meet two chicken sisters selling eggs. Nedley decides to move and asks Hamilton if he can borrow his box. Reggie tags along with Maggie, Hamilton and the Beast on their trip to the desert.
38	12	"Curtain Up/Icing on the Cake/Where's Maggie?"	June 2, 2002	September 18, 2003
Hamilton puts on a Cecil Bunions play. Maggie, Hamilton, the Beast and Rudy do a cooking show. The Beast and Hamilton wait for Maggie to return from a trip.
39	13	"The Bunny Slippers/The Windy Day/Nedley's Glasses"	June 9, 2002	September 17, 2003
Hamilton makes the Beast a pair of bunny slippers. Maggie's map blows away in the wind. Nedley tries on a pair of glasses and refuses to take them off.
