= Gracie Graves and the Kids from Room 402 =

1995 children's book

- Author: Betty Paraskevas
- Illustrator: Michael Paraskevas
- Language: English
- Genre: Children's literature
- Publisher: Harcourt Brace
- Publication date: September 1, 1995
- Publication place: United States
- Pages: 40
- ISBN: 978-0152003210

Gracie Graves and the Kids from Room 402 is a 1995 children's book written by Betty Paraskevas and illustrated by Michael Paraskevas. The book describes the students in Gracie Graves's classroom using rhyming poems which are accompanied by drawings. Gracie Graves and the Kids from Room 402 received mixed reviews from critics. It was adapted into an animated series, The Kids from Room 402, which ran from 1999 to 2001.

== Content ==
The book details the 28 students in Gracie Graves's classroom. Gracie and each student are described using poems which are accompanied by drawings. In the last poem, the reader is asked to choose the student with which they identify the best. Its illustration is a group picture of the students and the poem states: "Which one is me and which is you?"

According to Publishers Weekly, the children described in rhymes include "familiar targets for jokes – a kid who vomits after eating 16 Twinkies at the Halloween party; a boy who brings odiferous lunches; the girl who is a 'chubby-plus'; the math whiz whose clothes don't fit." Other examples highlighted by School Library Journal include "Anna May Johnson who...'didn't need a reason to give a kid a whack'...Ruthie Drew, who stuffs the valentine box with cards for herself...Molly and Polly McShane, twins of unequal intellect", and Ray Tupper who "tells everyone that his dad was in the CIA".

== Style ==
Gracie Graves and the Kids from Room 402 describes in rhyming verses each student in Gracie Graves's classroom as well as Gracie herself. Every character has an individual portrait to complement the poem; an illustration in black line drawings and watercolor. Through the classroom decorations or reading lists in the drawings, Betty and Michael Paraskevas make reference to their books Junior Kroll (1993) and Monster Beach (1995). R. Howard Blount Jr. of The Tampa Tribune regarded the illustrations as "cute, colorful and slightly off-the-wall".

== Background ==
Betty and Michael Paraskevas began collaborating after Michael asked Betty to write a story for him to draw an illustration based on it for Dan's Papers. Michael suggested afterwards to work on a book together. Their first book, On the Edge of the Sea, was released in 1992. Gracie Graves and the Kids from Room 402 was the ninth book they collaborated on. Harcourt Brace published it on September 1, 1995.

== Reception ==
Gracie Graves and the Kids from Room 402 received mixed reviews from critics. Booklist reviewer April Judge considered the poems to be "silly, rhyming" and amusing. She praised the drawings and classified the book as a "whimsical look into classroom life" which entices "young readers and listeners". Writing for the Telegraph Herald, Lynn Hoffmann labeled the verses "humorous" and deemed the illustrations neatly elaborate. She added that the children are "endearing, amusing or obnoxious". Scholars Miriam Martinez and Marcia F. Nash wrote in Language Arts that Betty used a "minimum of choice details" which made the classroom "as real as can be" and that "it is hard" for the reader to not respond to Betty's invitation to choose the student with which they identify the best. Book Links critics Stanley and Joy Steiner suggested that students could be inspired by Gracie Graves and the Kids from Room 402 to "write about their own experiences in school and with books". In The Horn Book Guide, Patricia Riley praised the poems for being comical, but found the children uninteresting and criticized the lack of African-American students.

Publishers Weekly wrote that the majority of the poems resemble "aborted starts to larger stories" and that nearly every verse contains "at least one awkward rhyme". The magazine concluded that the pair have "a handle on grade-school grotesquerie" and likened the book to a "kooky stranger's yearbook". Kirkus Reviews noted that the lines seldom rhyme appropriately and that the use of stereotypes reminds of "another era". In the School Library Journal, Kay E. Vandergrift was critical of the book, opining that the poems communicate a "sort of smug superiority of adults" mocking the shortcomings of children instead of "genuine childlike humor" and that it "reinforces low self-esteem in children" while "[glorifying] the worst behavior".

== Adaptation ==
Gracie Graves and the Kids from Room 402 was developed into an animated TV series titled The Kids from Room 402. It focuses on the students in Gracie Graves' classroom whom TV Guide labeled as "nine-year old eccentrics". Quebec-based CinéGroupe produced the series and Lesa Kite wrote the episodes with Cindy Begel. The Kids from Room 402 consisted of 52 episodes which aired on Teletoon in Canada and on Fox Family Channel in the United States from 1999 to 2001.

== Sources ==
- Crump, William D. (2019). Happy Holidays Animated! A Worldwide Encyclopedia of Christmas, Hanukkah, Kwanzaa and New Year's Cartoons on Television and Film. McFarland & Company. p. 330. ISBN 9781476672939.
- Erickson, Hal (2005). Television Cartoon Shows: An Illustrated Encyclopedia, 1949 Through 2003. Vol. 1. McFarland & Company. p. 473. ISBN 9780786420995.
- Judge, April (1995). "Books for Youth: Books for the Young". Booklist. 92 (7): 639.
- Martinez, Miriam; Nash, Marcia F. (1997). "Talking About Children's Books". Language Arts. 74 (3): 218. doi:10.58680/la19973207. ProQuest 196855468.
- The Horn Book Guide to Children's and Young Adult Books. Vol. 7. The Horn Book Magazine. 1997. p. 139.
- Vandergrift, Kay E. (1995). "Book Review: Preschool & Primary". School Library Journal. 41 (11): 92. ISSN 0362-8930.
