= The Kids from Room 402 =

Animated television series

- Genre: Comedy
- Based on: Gracie Graves and the Kids from Room 402 by Betty Paraskevas and Michael Paraskevas
- Developed by: Lesa Kite; Cindy Begel
- Directed by: Wade Konowalchuk
- Starring: Mindy Cohn; Tara Strong; Spencer Klein; Andrew Lawrence; Colleen O'Shaughnessey; Bryton McClure; Christopher Marquette; April Winchell; Rodger Bumpass
- Composers: Glenn Scott Lacey; Lior Rosner; Shuki Levy; Haim Saban
- Countries of origin: Canada; United States
- Original language: English
- No. of seasons: 2
- No. of episodes: 52

Production
- Executive producers: Jacques Pettigrew; Michael Lemire; Andrew Makarewicz (episodes 41–52 only); Fonda Snyder
- Producer: Louis Duquet
- Running time: 22 minutes
- Production companies: CinéGroupe; Saban Entertainment

Original release
- Network: Fox Family Channel (US); Teletoon (Canada); Fox Kids (international)
- Release: October 9, 1999 – November 29, 2001

The Kids from Room 402 is an animated series produced by CinéGroupe and Saban Entertainment that premiered on October 9, 1999 on the Fox Family Channel in the United States, and on August 29, 2000 on Teletoon in Canada. It consists of 52 half-hour episodes, the last of which aired in 2000, with reruns airing until 2005. The series was also seen in Latin America and Europe on Fox Kids, with the latter region still airing the series after the Fox Kids channels were purchased by Disney and changed their name to Jetix; Remaining on their schedule until the Jetix channels were once again rebranded as Disney XD.

The series is focused primarily on a group of elementary school students. Miss Graves, their teacher, is usually shown as an interlocutor in the issues and injustices that are inflicted upon the students, whether the dilemmas are internal or external. Each episode usually ends with a substantiated moral or lesson resulting from such aforementioned situations.

The series is based on the 40-page children's book Gracie Graves and the Kids from Room 402 by Betty Paraskevas and Michael Paraskevas (authors of Junior Kroll series and creators of Maggie and the Ferocious Beast), published in 1995. This was retitled in 2000 as simply "The Kids from Room 402" to match the series.

The animated series was story edited and developed for television by Lesa Kite and Cindy Begel, who wrote all 52 episodes.

== Characters ==
=== Kids from Room 402 ===
- Nancy Francis (voiced by Mindy Cohn) - Nancy is a redheaded girl with horn-rimmed glasses. Nancy has snobbish tendencies. She spends a lot of time trying to make herself popular. She is a good learner and a straight-A student. She always tries to fit in. She helps Jesse out a lot because he is picked on. Albeit good-natured, she is sometimes bossy. She is always trying to befriend Penny, but she is unsuccessful at that. Sometimes she ended up being "friends" with Polly McShane who she mostly dislikes. She and Jesse serve as the co-protagonists.
- Jesse McCoy (voiced by Spencer Klein/Shawn Pyfrom) - Jesse is the dumbest kid in the school, and he is often verbally picked on by his friends, including Vinnie, because his mother treats him like a baby. Whenever he has a hard task or homework to do, he usually gets out of it by telling a lie to Miss Graves or sometimes his mother, but both of them catch on and give him several punishments. Jesse is bald and wears an orange sweater with blue collar shirt underneath, and blue jeans.
- Vincent "Vinnie" Nasta (voiced by Andrew Lawrence/Pamela Adlon) - Vinnie is the prankster of the class. He is a tall Italian-American boy who likes to pull pranks on people. Even Miss Graves. Based on that, he tends to be a thorn in her side, to the point where she so often threatens to call his mother on him whenever he tries them on her. Vinnie wears a football jersey and has spiky brown hair. He is also friends with Jesse, and the two pull pranks together on some reason, although sometimes he picks on Jesse mainly due to how his mother treats him. Vinnie has an older brother named Tony, whose past school projects Vinnie often tries to pass as his own but Miss Graves always remembers having already evaluated them during Tony's time. Vinnie once lost his friends when they learned his aunt married Mr. Besser but fortunately the wedding was short-lived.
- Polly McShane (voiced by Colleen O'Shaughnessey) - Polly, a proud Lithuanian-American, is considered a "teacher's pet" in both demeanor and appearance. Polly is extremely intelligent (she is highly gifted and earned a score of 152 SD 15 - 99.97365 percentile - on the IQ test as was revealed in the episode HIQ) and has glasses, brown hair and a red and blue-striped dress. The other children, including the staff, can usually detect her presence due to her constant yodeling and obnoxious and intense disposition, especially because of her very, very loud voice. She has an obsession with spoons. She is also well known for wanting to be the life of the party and be on top of everything, and for being a gossip and tattletale to the heads of the class over other children she catches behaving badly. For all of these reasons, she is a major thorn in the flesh of everyone, especially Nancy and Miss Graves. She has a pet goat named Schnitzy.
- Penny Grant (voiced by Tara Strong) - Penny is Danish-American and one of the wealthiest girls in the entire school, as well as a very charitable and kind person. Penny is not a snob despite the common stereotype following rich kids in modern-day animation. She has blonde hair and blue eyes that helps her fit in very nicely. She is faithful and voluntarily participate to social programs in order to help other people. Also, she is intelligent, hardworking and a bright student, often earning the best results on the class. Nancy and the other girls from the class try to befriend her because of how wealthy and kind she is, but sometimes Penny doesn't even realize that she is rich, and that Nancy and the other girls are always trying to befriend her (although she doesn't despise them).
- Arthur Kenneth Van Der Wall (voiced by Christopher Marquette) - An upper-class Dutch-American boy who is usually attempting to sell abnormally extravagant goods to the other children in the class. He has auburn hair and wears a blue suit. He is smart, clever and practical but also has a very shy personality. He often tries to profit from others, but usually his plans fail.
- Freddie Fay (voiced by Bryton McClure) - Freddie is basically classified as a nerd boy in the school and he often bemoans that fact. He has glasses, black hair, wears a yellow shirt and sticks out as an easily found school nerd. He works very hard to have good results and is an A− student. Being silly is frequently mocked by the others, especially Vinnie and Jesse, or fooled by Arthur who sometimes uses him in his plans. E.g. in one episode everyone picked on him because they thought he had wet his pants, when actually the water fountain sprayed him by accident.
- Charlie (voiced by Crystal Scales) - An African-American boy who looks slightly similar to Sanjay, with dark hair and a red shirt. He often wins what Nancy should have won. In one episode, the class switched seats to fool Mr. Besser when he became a substitute teacher, and when Nancy's report was worth an A, Mr. Besser mistook her for Charlie due to the seating arrangement plans (since he knew few of the students' names except for Jesse and Vinnie, whom he often put in detention). And when Jesse got glasses that he couldn't see with, he was the swing vote between Nancy and Charlie, and, while intending to vote for Nancy, voted for Charlie by mistake because he couldn't see the names clearly.
- Jordan (voiced by Lauren Tom) - A Chinese-American girl who is very rich, but keeps that in a secret. Nancy finds out in one episode, promising Jordan to keep the secret out of fear her friends will think she's a snob. To keep them from knowing, she did not invite anyone to her house, which caused some people to think she's poor. However, when Nancy bragged so much about having a wealthy friend (without telling anyone she was referring to Jordan) her other friends started avoiding her like Jordan feared would happen to her if they knew she was wealthy.
- Gabrielle (voiced by Olivia Hack) - A girl who is usually seen with Jordan and Nancy. She mostly goes along with everything Jordan thinks or does, and although she is Nancy's friend, sometimes argues with her.
- Mary-Ellen (voiced by Colleen O'Shaughnessey) - An African-American girl who is one of Nancy's friends. Doesn't have much participation in the series.
- Tillie (voiced by Tifanie Christun) - Another of Nancy's friends, a tall girl with brown hair who is somewhat self-absorbed.
- Jenny - A girl with red glasses who doesn't have much participation in the class.
- Joey Tuna - A tall boy who is often seen sitting next to Jesse in the series. Another character that doesn't have much participation in the series.
- Don - A Chinese-American tall boy, and doesn't interact much with the others.
- Piggy McCall (voiced by Justin Jon Ross) - A slightly fat boy with glasses who is also a minor character,
- Melanie Bellanchof (voiced by Debi Derryberry) - A new student to the school, she is Mrs. Bellanchof's daughter, her parents are either divorced or split up, as Melanie comes to town to live with her mother. She doesn't like living with her and when referring to anything that she doesn't liken will say either "Don't know", "Don't care" or "Smells". At her house, she is mostly seen on the phone talking to a friend from her old school named Gloria.

=== Other kids ===
- Sanjay (voiced by Tara Strong) - An Indian-American student with dark brown hair, a maroon shirt, and speaks with an accent, who looks slightly similar to Charlie. He is often irritated by Polly.
- Zack (voiced by Sam Saletta) - The bully of the school and a recurring antagonist.

=== Adults ===
- Miss Gracie Graves (voiced by April Winchell) - Miss Gracie Graves is a really good teacher. She acts as the voice of reason, which is why most of her students go to her whenever they seek help or advice.
- Mr. Stuart Besser (voiced by Rodger Bumpass) - Mr. Stuart Besser is the incompetent principal of the school. Noted for his stupidity and overweight stature, he is often satirized, whether it be vocal or written, by his students. His negligence and ignorance serves as recurring comic relief within the television show. Mr. Besser was once married to Vinnie's aunt, much to the shock of both males (Vinnie didn't know Mr. Besser was his aunt's husband and Mr. Besser didn't know Vinnie is his wife's nephew until the two of them met during the wedding party) but the wedding ended when she learned he expected to live at her expenses. Mr. Besser was oblivious to the fact Vinnie didn't like being his nephew.
- Nurse Pitts (voiced by Lori Alan) - The school nurse. She's obsessed with illness and also talks a lot about death. The kids, as well as the teachers, are scared of her.
- Coach (voiced by Cam Clarke) - The school gym teacher.
- Roberta McCoy (voiced by Edie McClurg) - Jesse's overprotective mother. She usually treats Jesse like a baby and embarrasses him near his friends who sometimes mock him.
- Mrs. Amy Bellanchof - Melanie's mother who is a teacher attending Melanie's new school. However, as she didn't have a lesson plan, her students made a bit progress, which put her on the verge of getting fired. Although Miss Graves helped her improve her class by sharing her lesson plan, Mrs. Bellanchof dishonestly passed Miss Graves' plan as her own to win an award. In other acts that show her lack of honesty, she got custody of her daughter by lying to the judge about which parent Melanie would rather live with, and used her position at the school to have her daughter join the cheerleading squad despite Melanie trying to tell her she doesn't want to be a cheerleader. She also loses her temper easily, especially when Melanie complains and tells her she wants to go back to live with her father, pulling her hair and screaming when she is overly angry or stressed.
- Mrs. Francis (voiced by April Winchell) - Nancy's mother.

=== Cameo adults ===
- Mrs. Myerson (voiced by April Winchell) - She is a stout woman with a very pleasant and respectable disposition. She wears a pink dress and has blonde hair. She lives in a neighborhood around the school. She briefly appears a few times in the episode "Bing, Bing, Bing, and a Shot".
- Mr. Miller (voiced by Mel Brooks) - He is the pool official of a swimming pool in Miami that Nancy goes to visit. He gives her a hard time about things like hygiene. He appears in the episode "Squeezed Out".

== Episodes ==
=== Season 1 (2000) ===
No.	Title	Written, developed, and story edited by	Original release date
1	"Son of Einstein"	Lesa Kite & Cindy Begel	August 29, 2000
Jesse gets the math book with the answers to the tests by mistake and it helps him become "smart". Because of this, he wins a prize at the math competition, but finds out that he has to answer the math questions in front of the whole school. Meanwhile, Nancy pretends that she has difficulty listening so she can sit up front with Penny, but instead she is sent to see the school nurse.
2	"Welcome to Safety Corner"	Lesa Kite & Cindy Begel	September 2, 2000
Nancy returns from her vacation in Mexico with a charm bracelet and soon she becomes popular at school, but the bracelet vanishes and Nancy believes that it has been stolen. Meanwhile, Polly and Arthur are selected to be crossing guards, and Arthur immediately sets up a toll booth.
3	"The Used Gum Chewer"	Lesa Kite & Cindy Begel	September 3, 2000
Jesse becomes an outcast after Freddie tells everyone that Jesse ate a piece of chewed gum that he found under his desk. Meanwhile, the kids try to watch a part of a documentary named "Chinook from the North."
4	"The One Man Committee"	Lesa Kite & Cindy Begel	September 5, 2000
Jesse is thrilled when he is teamed up with Freddie and Polly (the smartest students of the class) to present a committee report, because he figures they'll do all of the work and he'll get the credit. Meanwhile, in order to match with her friends' fashion, Nancy buys a fur hat, but it's too big and everyone laughs at her.
5	"The Half Wit"	Lesa Kite & Cindy Begel	September 9, 2000
Jesse wants to be the funniest kid in class, so he memorizes a joke book of insults. His popularity makes him to be invited to Mary-Ellen's birthday party, but then he runs out of insults and decides to use his own stuff - with disastrous consequences. Meanwhile, Arthur loses his ring and, in order to find it, he's hired to the Lost and Found office where Polly and Mr. Besser work. He manages to get Polly to get out of his way and keep all of the lost things to himself.
6	"Shy Kidney"	Lesa Kite & Cindy Begel	September 10, 2000
Nancy is excited when she is partnered with a new boy on a trip to a museum, only to learn that he doesn't speak any English. Arthur and Freddie try to find the vacancy toilet around the museum. Jesse tries to run away from his mother who joined the trip as a chaperone.
7	"Is Your Refrigerator Running"	Lesa Kite & Cindy Begel	September 12, 2000
Jesse and Vinnie obtain a faculty phone list and use it to make prank phone calls until Mr. Besser finds out, but catches Vinnie only and makes him his helper for a week as punishment. When Jesse listens that Miss Graves wants to talk with his mother about something, he's convinced that she wants to tell his mother about phone pranks and fakes illness to stay at home and guard the phone. Meanwhile, Nancy pretends to be Polly's friend to join her and Penny in a weekend trip to the Lithuania Dance Festival.
8	"The Arthur Kenneth Vanderwall Library"	Lesa Kite & Cindy Begel	September 16, 2000
Polly becomes a junior librarian and is determined to reclaim all of the library's overdue books, driving everyone crazy in the process. Arthur collects the books from his friends and opens his own library.
9	"Free Lunch"	Lesa Kite & Cindy Begel	September 17, 2000
Arthur pretends to leave his lunch at home when he learns that the cafeteria workers give great free meals to kids who forget their lunches. Meanwhile, in order to get revenge on Zack after he bullied her, Nancy tries to learn karate.
10	"The Moocher"	Lesa Kite & Cindy Begel	September 19, 2000
The kids get tired of Jesse's constant borrowing, so he finds a new mark in Freddie and even takes his homework. Meanwhile, Nancy tells the girls that she got a boyfriend named Jeremy, but Tillie suspects that he doesn't exist.
11	"The Girl in the Plastic Bubble"	Lesa Kite & Cindy Begel	September 23, 2000
Nancy is disappointed when she finds out that Penny is paired with Tillie at the sack race during Sports Day. However, Nancy becomes worried about illness before Sports Day. Meanwhile, Jesse is told by Miss Graves to take it easy in class after he bumps his nose and has to wear a bandage, but he takes advantage of the situation and wears it longer than he needs to.
12	"Over the River and Through the Swamp"	Lesa Kite & Cindy Begel	September 24, 2000
Arthur prepares to sing a solo at the school music festival until Polly barges in and turns his song into a duet. Meanwhile, Jesse cuts pictures from a book to put them in his report about mammals, but fears that someone will find out.
13	"Pretty as a Picture"	Lesa Kite & Cindy Begel	September 26, 2000
Freddie discovers that he and Polly are wearing the same cowboy shirt on picture day, so he tries to cover his shirt. Meanwhile, Jesse forgets about the biology test and tries to study until the test.
14	"The Anti-Mucous Forming, Artery Clogging, Energy Zapping Diet"	Lesa Kite & Cindy Begel	September 30, 2000
Penny begins to eat healthy food, so Nancy decides to eat healthy food too to match with her. Meanwhile, Freddie plans to take 10 friends to Monsterland, but Jesse and Vinnie want him to take fewer kids, so they can go on more rides.
15	"All Polly All the Day"	Lesa Kite & Cindy Begel	October 1, 2000
Polly takes over reading the announcements over the school's public address system and soon starts to broadcast everyone's misdeeds. Meanwhile, Jesse stays at home for few weeks due to his ankle injury. At first, he wants to have fun, but Miss Graves decides to make him participate in the class with the help of the camera.
16	"Spoons, Spiders and Space Beasts"	Lesa Kite & Cindy Begel	October 3, 2000
Jesse and Vinnie enter a science fair when they learn that the winners get to go to Space Camp, but they are caught cheating. Nancy and Penny do a project about bugs for the science fair. Polly chooses Freddie and they make a project about spoons, which Freddie sabotages.
17	"Mercury in Retrograde"	Lesa Kite & Cindy Begel	October 7, 2000
Nancy is convinced that her bad luck is determined by the stars, so she turns to a Web astrology chart for guidance. Meanwhile, Freddie is accidentally sprayed by the water fountain, with everyone thinking that he had wet his pants.
18	"Bad Seed"	Lesa Kite & Cindy Begel	October 8, 2000
Jesse takes credit for a prank and is sent to Mr. Karl's class, where he encounters the school's toughest kids, who seem to never do any real work. Meanwhile, the school's classes prepare for a fire test, but most of class 402 sneak to the pool party at Arthur's aunt's house.
19	"There Must Be a Pony"	Lesa Kite & Cindy Begel	October 10, 2000
The girls try to avoid Polly, only to meet her in a park where she is riding a pony, which then makes them all (except Nancy) want to become friends with her. Meanwhile, Jesse tells Miss Graves that he sent his report about Tom Sawyer to his grandparents.
20	"Mrs. McCoy's Baby Boy"	Lesa Kite & Cindy Begel	October 14, 2000
Jesse loses friends when he complains about missing a turn in a volleyball game and his mother gets involved. She treats him like a baby in front of his classmates and they begin to treat him like a baby too. Meanwhile, Nancy finds out that Jordan is very rich.
21	"Eenie Meenie"	Lesa Kite & Cindy Begel	October 15, 2000
Jesse and Vinnie start using swear words at school after some tough boys curse at them for playing a babyish video game. When Polly catches them, they must stop swearing to prevent Mr. Besser and Miss Graves from contacting their parents. Meanwhile, Nancy and the girls play many games to choose the first pair to play ping-pong which all end up failing.
22	"Bing, Bing, Bing and a Shot"	Lesa Kite & Cindy Begel	October 17, 2000
Polly updates the school's medical records and discovers that Jesse didn't have all of his required shots, thus making him get six of them. Meanwhile, the girl Squirrel Team delivers cookies from door to door and the two best delivery girls will go to the Squirrel camp. Nancy tries to be the best delivery girl, so she can go to the camp with Penny.

=== Season 2 (2000–01) ===
No.	Title	Written, developed, and story edited by	Original release date
23	"The Hand That Rocks the Cradle"	Lesa Kite & Cindy Begel	October 21, 2000
Nancy and Arthur try babysitting to make extra money.
24	"The Low Sodium, Adult Swim Only, Early Bird Special Vacation"	Lesa Kite & Cindy Begel	October 22, 2000
Nancy is surprised to meet Polly when she visits her relatives in Miami.
25	"Jesse Magoo"	Lesa Kite & Cindy Begel	January 17, 2001
Jesse cheats on an eye exam, which results in him having to get glasses. Meanwhile, Nancy and Charlie compete for the best sportsmen at school.
26	"Your Body is Changing"	Lesa Kite & Cindy Begel	October 28, 2000
The kids watch a movie about the facts of life and have different reactions to it. Jesse misses most of the movie because of his mother, making him still not knowing where babies come from. Meanwhile, Polly opens a spoon hospital.
27	"I Got a Boyfriend"	Lesa Kite & Cindy Begel	January 4, 2001
Nancy becomes Vinnie's girlfriend. Meanwhile, because of his aunt having a pool party, Arthur learns how to swim, but the teacher is Polly.
28	"The Peep and the Sheep"	Lesa Kite & Cindy Begel	January 9, 2001
The kids compete in a Halloween costume contest. Jesse and Vinnie make a deal that they don't wear the Space Beast costume, but they end up breaking the deal. Nancy goes as Little Bo Peep and sees someone as a sheep, thinking that is Penny and not realizing that is actually Polly.
29	"The School Fair"	Lesa Kite & Cindy Begel	January 11, 2001
The kids compete at the school's fair to create the best booth.
30	"A Visit to Nana and Pop-Pop's"	Lesa Kite & Cindy Begel	January 18, 2001
Jesse visits his grandparents and he misses the spelling test. Meanwhile, back at school, Vinnie is sent to detention with Mr. Besser.
31	"Chi Whiz"	Lesa Kite & Cindy Begel	January 25, 2001
Nancy tries to convert her class to Feng Shui.
32	"Simon of London"	Lesa Kite & Cindy Begel	February 1, 2001
Nancy wants a haircut made by Simon from London, but she realizes that he makes the haircuts for celebrities only. Nancy gets a haircut made by Nigel the cleaner and now she looks like a poodle. Meanwhile, Polly refuses to accept anything less than a perfect grade on a school paper.
33	"The Dumb Bunny"	Lesa Kite & Cindy Begel	February 8, 2001
Jesse skips his remedial math class. Meanwhile, Polly sells commemorative spoons.
34	"A Very Nancy Christmas"	Lesa Kite & Cindy Begel	December 22, 2001
Everyone wants to get even with Nancy when she takes over as writer, director and star of the school's play about Christmas. And they plan to do so on the night of the performance.
35	"Mr. Beeser the Liver Butcher"	Lesa Kite & Cindy Begel	February 15, 2001
Mr. Besser is compelled to substitute for Miss Graves when she calls in sick. When she finds out that there was a mix-up, she decides to have a day off. Meanwhile, back at school, Vinnie does a report about Mr. Besser, the Liver Butcher. Vinnie fears that Mr. Besser will punish him when he finds out. Luckily, Vinnie wrote Mr. Besser's name wrong.
36	"The Election Show"	Lesa Kite & Cindy Begel	February 22, 2001
Polly runs for school president. When she wins the election, she decides to change all at school. Her plan backfires.
37	"The Clique"	Lesa Kite & Cindy Begel	March 1, 2001
Nancy is thrilled when she breaks into a cool clique at school. Meanwhile, Jesse receives some nifty gifts for his good behavior.
38	"The Gazotski"	Lesa Kite & Cindy Begel	March 8, 2001
Polly teaches Sanjay a dance called the Gazotski. Meanwhile, Miss Graves shares her lesson plans with Miss Bellanchof, who is at risk of being fired from the school.
39	"The Sidewalk Boys"	Lesa Kite & Cindy Begel	March 15, 2001
Nancy manages to obtain a hard-to-get press pass to see the hit group, The Sidewalk Boys.
40	"Uncle Bonehead"	Lesa Kite & Cindy Begel	March 22, 2001
Mr. Besser marries Vinnie's aunt. Meanwhile, Polly teaches a class on fire safety at school.
41	"Squirrel Girls and Boys"	Lesa Kite & Cindy Begel	September 6, 2001
Arthur is nervous when he goes camping with the Squirrel Scouts because he's afraid to change his clothes in front of the others. Meanwhile, Nancy tries to spend time with Penny, but she gets stuck with Polly instead.
42	"Don't Know, Don't Care, Smells"	Lesa Kite & Cindy Begel	September 13, 2001
Miss Graves has trouble reaching a new student who's Miss Bellanchof's daughter, Melanie Bellanchof. Meanwhile, Nancy chooses to study India for an assignment and comes to believe that she had a previous life as a Hindu princess. Polly and Jordan argue about their assignments about Lithuania and China.
43	"Don't Put Your Fingers in the Light Socket"	Lesa Kite & Cindy Begel	September 20, 2001
Polly becomes Jesse's new babysitter, and he tries to keep that as a secret from the kids at school, but they eventually find out.
44	"Squeezed Out"	Lesa Kite & Cindy Begel	September 27, 2001
Nancy becomes the center of attention soon after she joins the garden club because of her knowledge about growing vegetables, but when she returns from a trip to Miami, she discovers that she's been forgotten.
45	"By Invitation Only"	Lesa Kite & Cindy Begel	October 4, 2001
Melanie is grounded, but her mom lifts it when Melanie starts to receive numerous party invitations. Meanwhile, Vinnie draws a picture called "Two Peaks" which annoys Miss Graves, but he insists that it is only a drawing of two mountains.
46	"It Takes Your Breath Away"	Lesa Kite & Cindy Begel	October 11, 2001
Nancy suffers from asthma and she tries to keep that a secret from the kids at school.
47	"No Refunds, No Exchanges"	Lesa Kite & Cindy Begel	October 18, 2001
Jesse sings to the exchange program to copy from the exchange student. An exchange student, Lars Svenholm, from Outer Maledonia comes to Jesse. However, Lars turns out to be the same as Jesse. Jesse realizes that as a part of the exchange program, he'll have to leave to Outer Maledonia. Meanwhile, Polly opens the spoon school.
48	"The Slam Book"	Lesa Kite & Cindy Begel	November 1, 2001
Fed up with that nobody from the class likes her, Melanie decides to create a slam book and write something about someone. The girls begin to fight when they write bad things about themselves on the slam book.
49	"Schnitzy R.I.P."	Lesa Kite & Cindy Begel	November 8, 2001
Polly's goat, Schnitzy, has died, and Polly becomes very depressed. Nancy is forced to help Polly.
50	"For Whom the Bell Tolls"	Lesa Kite & Cindy Begel	November 15, 2001
After watching Amber Amberset's new music video, Nancy and the girls begin to wear rebellious clothes and the bells. The only one who isn't happy with all this is Mr. Besser. Meanwhile, to be more cool than Zack, Jesse and Vinnie decide to wear earrings. Jesse fears that he will get hurt while putting on the earrings.
51	"Believe It or Not"	Lesa Kite & Cindy Begel	November 22, 2001
Miss Graves struggles with driving Nurse Pitts to school. In order to make sure that she doesn't find out that he didn't write his report about the planets, Jesse convinces Miss Graves to become forgetful because of Nurse Pitts. Meanwhile, Nancy is frightened by the tales about Billy Woofchuck who died when he answered the phone during a rainstorm.
52	"HIQ"	Lesa Kite & Cindy Begel	November 29, 2001
Mr. Besser mistakes Jesse and Polly's scores of their IQ tests. Because of this, Jesse goes to the class for geniuses and Polly is forced to hang out with the dumb kids. The truth comes out when Jesse and Polly reveal their true school intelligences.

== Home media ==
=== Canada ===
On April 8, 2003, CinéGroupe Star released a set of three VHS tapes called "Double Trouble"/"Sacré Délire", which featured an episode each from this show and What's with Andy?, alongside a music video from the Pig City tie-in album "Reggie and the Rashers". Volume 1 featured the episode "Over the River and Through the Swamp", Volume 2 featured the episode "All Polly All The Day", and Volume 3 featured the episode "The Anti-Mucous Forming, Artery Clogging, Energy Zapping Diet". The releases were sold in separate English and French versions, respectively.
