= Contraption =

Contraption may refer to:

- a contraption; a machine, device or gadget
- Contraption, a television game show formerly broadcast on the Disney Channel
- Circus Contraption, a one-ring circus, vaudeville and dark cabaret troupe based in Seattle, Washington
- Return of the Incredible Machine: Contraptions
- "The Contraption", an episode of Maggie and the Ferocious Beast
- "The Contraption", an episode of Riders in the Sky
- "Contraptions", an episode of Blue's Clues
