= Fly High, Fly Low =

1958 Caldecott picture book

- Author: Don Freeman
- Publisher: Viking
- Publication date: 1957
- Pages: unpaged
- Awards: Caldecott Honor

Fly High, Fly Low is a 1957 picture book written and illustrated by Don Freeman. The book tells the story of two birds whose nest gets taken down. The book was a recipient of a 1958 Caldecott Honor for its illustrations.
