= Hoppy and Joe =

1999 children's book

- Author: Betty Paraskevas
- Illustrator: Michael Paraskevas
- Language: English
- Genre: Children's literature
- Publisher: Simon & Schuster
- Publication date: May 1, 1999
- Publication place: United States
- Pages: 32
- ISBN: 978-0689821998

Hoppy and Joe is a 1999 children's book written by Betty Paraskevas and illustrated by Michael Paraskevas. The book details how the friendship between brown mutt Joe and seagull Hoppy is challenged when the former's owner decides to relocate. Hoppy and Joe is a poem which is accompanied by acrylic paintings.

== Plot ==
Joe is a brown mutt who spends his summer at the beach where his owner, Gino, operates a lemon-ice stand. Along the shore, Joe comes across Hoppy, a seagull who got stuck between two rocks and as a result is one-footed. He rescues Hoppy whom he then carries around on his back, while Gino does not want Hoppy close to his stand. When Gino decides to move somewhere else, Hoppy believes that his friendship with Joe has come to an end as the latter must go with his owner. Hoppy wishes to join the two by flying over Gino's truck but realizes that this is not doable as he is injured. Joe persuades his owner to allow Hoppy to join them; Gino capitulates and the three relocate to their new beachfront property.

== Style ==
Hoppy and Joe is a poem that uses acrylic paintings to describe the plot. Publishers Weekly said that Betty and Michael Paraskevas "demonstrate their customary brand of offbeat humor" in the book. The magazine added that Michael's illustrations "brim with drollery" and that "beach-ball-bright color" streaks constitute the summery atmosphere of Hoppy and Joe. The drawings have been described as bright by Kirkus Reviews, Bonnie Fowler of the Winston-Salem Journal, and Booklist's Julie Corsaro, who also labeled them as "sand-textured". Mary Harris Russell, writing for the Chicago Tribune, indicated that Hoppy and Joe have "smart-mouthed personalities". Reviewers identified the friendship between the two characters as unlikely.

== Reception ==
Publishers Weekly said that Hoppy and Joe is "another feather in the Paraskevases' cap". Kirkus Reviews recommended the book for readers "looking for something to read at the beach, or to read when the beach is closed". Fowler wrote that they will enjoy Hoppy and Joe's "engaging personalities and loyalty to each other" and that the "illustrations perfectly accompany the tale". Corsaro thought that children will be captivated by the paintings and Hoppy's "struggle to fly south" as well as Joe's "faithful friendship".

Harris Russell praised the drawings for "conveying Hoppy's range of emotions". The Buffalo News's Jean Westmoore called Hoppy and Joe a "very funny tale of friendship" and said that Michael's drawings are "wonderful". School Library Journal reviewer Susan Pine noted that the "bold" colors work "for this silly story of three unlikely friends".
