= Marvin the Tap-Dancing Horse =

Canadian animated television series

- Genre: Animated series Fantasy
- Based on: Marvin the Tap-Dancing Horse by Michael Paraskevas; Betty Paraskevas
- Directed by: Michael Smukavic (S1); Stuart Shankly (S1); Laura Shepherd (S2)
- Theme music composer: Great Big Music Inc. (Note: A team of music composers consisting of Tom Thorney, Tim Thorney, Peter Coulman, Brent Barkman and Carl Lenox)
- Opening theme: "Marvin the Tap-Dancing Horse"
- Ending theme: "Marvin the Tap-Dancing Horse" (instrumental)
- Composer: Great Big Music Inc.
- Countries of origin: Canada; China
- Original language: English
- No. of seasons: 2
- No. of episodes: 26 (52 segments)

Production
- Executive producers: Michael Hirsh; Patrick Loubert; Clive A. Smith; James Wang; Michael Paraskevas; Betty Paraskevas
- Running time: 26 minutes
- Production companies: Nelvana Limited; Hong Guang Animation (Suzhou) Co. Ltd.

Original release
- Network: PBS Kids (United States); Teletoon (Canada)
- Release: September 30, 2000 – January 26, 2002

“Bay roan” American Quarter Horse

Marvin the Tap-Dancing Horse is a children's animated television series. Based on the book of the same name by Michael and Betty Paraskevas, who also created Maggie and the Ferocious Beast, the series is co-produced by Nelvana Limited and Hong Guang Animation, produced in association with Teletoon and PBS.

== Premise ==
The series centers on a young horse named Marvin who is part of a 1950's carnival. Some episodes include original songs to help illustrate the theme or accompany montages that carry the story forward.

== Characters ==
- Marvin (voiced by Ron Pardo) is a dancing brown American quarter horse with a black mane and a tail who performs in Fast-Talking Jack's carnival. He used to be in films and on Broadway, his first big break, although he isn't very proud of his performance in it. His hooves are tuxedo-themed and they make tapping sounds. He also wears a red bowtie around his neck. In the start of one of the episodes, it is taken off.
- Edward Larue III ("Eddy Largo") (voiced by Marlowe Gardiner-Heslin) is a 9-year-old boy. In the first episode, he looks for a job and is hired on as a gofer and all-around assistant to owner Fast-Talking Jack. He changes his name to "Eddy Largo" because he felt that his real name was apparently too lackluster.
- Diamonds (voiced by Fiona Reid) is a fancy pink African bush elephant from Kenya. She is the main attraction of the circus. She has a big cloth on her back with a big yellow star as a decoration. Her act involves balancing on an inflated beach ball. She appears in almost every episode, most notably "Dare to Dream".
- Elizabeth the Emotional Pig (voiced by Sheila McCarthy) is a pink American Yorkshire pig who walks on two legs. She is easily upset and has a tendency to moan and cry a lot. When things go right, she feels ecstatically happy. She wears a turquoise dress with two yellow lines on her skirt with buttons, collar flaps and cuffs. Her specialty is juggling, normally pineapples. She also compulsively eats corn on the cob. She appears in almost every episode, most notably "Elizabeth in Charge".
- Stripes the Tiger (voiced by Ron Pardo) is a hefty Bengal tiger from India. He is rather a little grumpy, but very kindhearted with a soft spot for "Mr. Grizzly", his torn-and-tattered stuffed bear. It's mentioned in the episode "Stripes Takes Off" that he weighs 400 pounds. His favorite meals are 32 chickens for dinner and a giant bowl of Crunchy Creatures cereal soaked for ten minutes to have the right degree of sogginess for breakfast. He also enjoys reading the newspaper. Being a tiger, most people are afraid of him, so he is often seen inside his cage.
- Fast-Talking Jack (voiced by Dwayne Hill) is the owner of the carnival and a ringmaster of the big show in which he also plays as a lion tamer for Stripes' act.
- Edna (voiced by Robin Duke) is the smart fortune teller who also makes the lemonade and lemon ice sold at the carnival. She is a stickler for using juice she hand squeezes herself. Her screechy singing voice can easily break glass. Although she isn't in many episodes, her most notable appearances are in "Eddy's Fortune" and "Edna the Singing Sensation".
- Lyman Slime (voiced by Rummy Bishop) is the sleazy owner of a clown circus, who sees Jack's carnival as unwelcomed competition. He sometimes sends his three clowns to spy on the carnival or to sabotage it.
- The Penguin's Five are a band that accompanies the acts at the performance tent, made up of five penguins (hence the name).
- Eddy's grandmother can be somewhat formidable, and has a habit of firmly tapping the floor with her cane when wanting to emphasize a point. Eddy spends the summer at her house while he works at the carnival. She still calls Eddy his real name, Edward.
- Squinty Pete is the proprietor of the Whomp-A-Weasel game in the carnival's midway.
- Mr. P. Nutty sells peanuts during the big show and around the carnival. Wears a Peanut costume featuring a huge grin. His real name is Philbert, has a high-pitched voice and professes to be a little shy.
- Lulabelle Rose is a tan mare with a light brown mane and tail with red lips and a daisy on her ear and Marvin's girlfriend. She is great at tap dancing just like him. Her only appearance is "The Importance of Being Eddy".
- Lucy is Jack's niece who appeared in the episode "Eddy's Charm". Eddy has a crush on her and is his girlfriend.
- Boris is a circus bear from Russia looking for work at the circus. He specializes in peeling peanuts and telling stories about the Russian country. He appeared in "Truth or Bear".
- Clyde is a racehorse who is Marvin's younger brother (even though he's now bigger than Marvin). He appeared in "Marvin Keeps Track". He and Marvin used to do great things together when they were young and Marvin was always the winner, but now Clyde always beats Marvin. Marvin was not pleased to see him at all because he had forgotten that about their past, but then Clyde reminded him. So if not for Marvin, Clyde never would've been a racehorse.
- Dr. Tusk is another elephant, who is a star of Diamonds and Elizabeth's favourite soap opera Animal Hospital and is Diamonds' boyfriend. He appeared in live in-person at Fast-Talking Jack's Carnival in Dare to Dream.

== Episodes ==
=== Season 1 (2000) ===
No.	Episode 1	Episode 2	U.S. airdate (PBS)
1	Eddy's Job	Elephants Almost Never Forget	September 30, 2000
2	Marvin's High Dive	Eddy's Wrong Order	October 7, 2000
3	Stripes' Sticky Situation	Stripes Takes Off	October 14, 2000
4	The New Band	Eddy's Video	October 21, 2000
5	Elizabeth's Biggest Fan	The Visit	October 28, 2000
6	Marvin's Roommate	Stripes' Dental Fuss	November 4, 2000
7	Marvin's Surprise	Eddy Learns to Dance	November 11, 2000
8	Visit to Grandma's	Gone Fishing	November 18, 2000
9	Marvin's Breakfast Jam	The Iron Claw	November 25, 2000
10	Elizabeth and the Haunted House	Marvin Horses Around	December 2, 2000
11	The Big Show	Eddy's Fortune	December 9, 2000
12	Eddy's Charm	Eddy and the Cowboy	December 16, 2000
13	When Pigs Fly	Mr. P. Nutty	December 23, 2000

=== Season 2 (2001–2002) ===
No.	Episode 1	Episode 2	U.S. airdate (PBS)
14	Now You See It...	When the Stars Come Out	November 3, 2001
15	Eddy and the Record	Marvin in the Movies	November 10, 2001
16	Marvin and Eddy in the Middle of Nowhere	Stripes' Mis-Fortune	November 17, 2001
17	Just for Kicks	Edna the Singing Sensation	November 24, 2001
18	Elizabeth in Charge	Dare to Dream	December 1, 2001
19	The Importance of Being Eddy	Eddy's Sore Throat	December 8, 2001
20	Little Olaf	Jokers Go Wild	December 15, 2001
21	Pop Goes the Weasel	Marvin's Lucky Hat	December 22, 2001
22	To Flea or Not to Flea	Eddy's Sleepover	December 29, 2001
23	Marvin Keeps Track	Diamonds' Dance Party	January 5, 2002
24	Paint Your Wagon	Truth or Bear	January 12, 2002
25	Elizabeth's Big Splash	Stripes' World Tour	January 19, 2002
26	Little Big Man	Fast Talkin' Jack's Real Class Act (final episode)	January 26, 2002

== Telecast and home media ==
In Canada, it aired on Teletoon (now Cartoon Network). In China, it aired on CCTV3. The show aired on PBS in the U.S. as a part of the PBS Kids Bookworm Bunch from 2000 until 2004. Three years later, now-defunct Qubo aired the show until 2020. In the United Kingdom, the show also aired on Tiny Pop. In the mid-2000s, Our Time Family Entertainment (a family-oriented division of anime licensing company FUNimation Productions) released the show on both VHS and DVD. The entire series was officially released onto YouTube on Treehouse TV's channel. From 2023 to 2026, the show was streaming on Tubi.

== External reference ==
- Marvin the Tap Dancing Horse Summary of the Show
- Marvin the Tap Dancing Horse Synopsis
- Nelvana: Marvin the Tap Dancing Horse Episode Guide
