= A Pocket for Corduroy =

1978 children's book by Don Freeman

- Author: Don Freeman
- Illustrator: Don Freeman
- Language: English
- Genre: Children's literature, picture book
- Publisher: Viking Press
- Publication date: 1978
- Publication place: United States
- Preceded by: Corduroy

A Pocket for Corduroy is a 1978 children's book written and illustrated by Don Freeman. It is a sequel to his 1968 book Corduroy.

== Plot ==
Lisa accidentally loses Corduroy, her teddy bear, at a laundromat. After a series of adventures, while Corduroy searches for material to make a pocket, he becomes trapped in a laundry basket until he is found the next morning by the laundromat's owner. Corduroy is reunited with Lisa, who promptly takes him home to sew a pocket onto his overalls so that Corduroy can carry a name card with him.

== Reception ==
Mary LeCompte of Common Sense Media praised the book, writing that it "has all the charm of the original with a gentle but lively plot and highly descriptive pictures." Kirkus Reviews was also generally positive.

== Adaptations ==
A Pocket for Corduroy was made into a short television movie in 1986. An American Sign Language (ASL) version of A Pocket for Corduroy was released through Scholastic Corporation/Weston Woods in 2009. This version includes the original story, artwork, voice-over, music and read along captions. The 2000 animated TV series Corduroy was based on A Pocket for Corduroy as well as its predecessor. A stage version of the two books was also produced by the Children's Theatre Company in 2018.
