= Stuart Benjamin =

American film producer

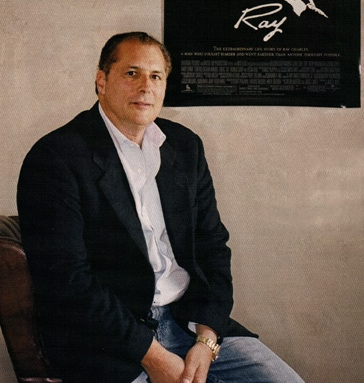
- Born: Stuart Benjamin; April 25, 1946 (age 80); Los Angeles, California, U.S.
- Occupations: Producer, basketball executive
- Children: 2

Stuart Benjamin (born April 25, 1946) is an American film and theater producer and professional basketball executive. He produced such films as Against All Odds, Ray, and La Bamba.

== Biography ==
=== Early life ===
Benjamin was born in Los Angeles. He attended North Hollywood High School where he lettered in Varsity basketball and served on the student council. He went on to graduate from the University of Southern California in 1967 with a degree in finance, where he played basketball and served as the President of Associated Men, was a Rhodes Scholar candidate, and was a recipient of the prestigious Man of Troy award. He also attended Harvard Law School, and graduated in 1970. He is the son of Gerald Benjamin, a corporate executive, and Victorine Benjamin, a housewife.

=== Career ===
He began his career in 1970 with the law firm of Wyman, Bautzer, Finell, Rothman and Kuchel. He became a partner in 1975, specializing in business, securities and entertainment litigation, as well as sports law, and was chairman of the firm's entertainment department at the time he left the firm in January 1988. From 1975 to 1978, Benjamin served on the board of directors of the Boston Celtics and received a championship ring when the Celtics won a World Championship in 1976. In 1978, Benjamin was involved in the formation of the San Diego Clippers and served on their board until 1981. While still being very proactive in his original community.

In 1971, Benjamin and director Taylor Hackford formed a production company called New Visions, Inc. Throughout most of the 70's, they produced documentaries, docu-dramas and a great number of music-concert shows. Their short film Teenage Father garnered Hackford an Oscar in 1979 for the short film. Benjamin and Hackford went on to produce several other films under the New Visions banner: Against All Odds, White Nights, La Bamba, Everybody's All-American.

Outside of New Visions, Benjamin was actively involved in the production of the highly acclaimed Testament. The film tells the story of how one small Bay Area town near San Francisco slowly falls apart after a nuclear war destroys outside civilization. Jane Alexander was nominated for the Academy Award for Best Actress for her performance. He also produced the highly acclaimed film for American Playhouse, Billy Galvin, starring Karl Malden.

In 1988, Benjamin and Hackford formed New Visions Pictures, a joint venture between New Visions Entertainment and Cineplex Odeon. Benjamin served as president and chief operating officer of New Visions Pictures from 1988 through 1991, during which time the venture produced six films: The Long Walk Home, Defenseless, Sweet Talker, Queen's Logic, Mortal Thoughts, and Rooftops. Benjamin served as the executive producer on all of these films.

As a principal in New Visions Music Group along with Taylor Hackford and Joel Sill, Benjamin has been involved in a number of sound track albums, several of which have achieved gold or platinum status. New Visions Music Group was responsible for nine number one singles.

In 1991, Benjamin formed Benjamin Productions. Together with partner Alise Benjamin Mauritzson, he produced films for both network television and cable including Betrayal of Trust for NBC, The Abduction for Lifetime Television and Sodbusters for Showtime. The company also produced Corduroy, an animated series for Viacom and the USA Network, which became a Saturday morning series on CBS, and Safe House, starring Patrick Stewart and Kimberly Williams for Showtime.

In 2000, Benjamin was involved in the formation of Crusader Entertainment, a film and motion picture company financed by Philip Anschutz, and served as Executive Vice President of the company from its formation until July 2001, when he became a consultant/independent producer to Crusader with specific responsibilities on a number of Crusader's projects. It was while he was an executive at Crusader that his pet project, The Ray Charles Story was put into development. Benjamin was first introduced to Ray Charles in the late 1980s and had tried for years to get Charles' story made into a movie. During the course of those efforts, Benjamin and Charles developed a friendship, resulting in Charles agreeing to make the picture and with Charles fully participating in its development. Benjamin produced Ray, which was released in late 2004 by Universal Pictures. The picture garnered six Academy Award Nominations including a Best Picture, which gave Benjamin his first Academy Award Nomination. The film went on to receive two Academy Awards. Benjamin also produced the soundtrack album from the movie which has sold over four million units and which has garnered Benjamin a Grammy Award. Benjamin was also one of the Executive Producers of the Ray Charles Tribute Concert which took place on October 8, 2004, at the Staples Center and was a CBS Television special. That program received a number of awards, including the prestigious NAACP Image Award.

In the fall of 2007, Benjamin successfully launched a live theatrical production based upon the life of Ray Charles, "Unchain My Heart...The Life and Music of Ray Charles"

In March 2009, Benjamin produced Louis & Keely Live at the Geffen Playhouse in Westwood, Los Angeles, California. This theatrical production, based on Las Vegas lounge act Louis Prima and Keely Smith, went on to become the longest running show in the history of the Geffen. On January 11, 2010, Benjamin and his fellow producers of the show received an Ovation Award given out by the Los Angeles Stage Alliance for Best Production of a Musical – Large Theatre.

As a music producer, Benjamin not only produced the soundtrack album for the film Ray, but also executive produced the Sam Moore comeback album, Overnight Sensational.

In addition, Benjamin was the Managing Partner of Capstone Entertainment, which was in the business of producing specialized non-theatrical projects. Those projects include a reunion of the 1960s Vince Lombardi Green Bay Packers, which aired on ESPN Classics in January 2002, and a series of Comedy Roasts with Shaquille O'Neal, shot at the MGM Grand Hotel in Las Vegas, which aired on OnDemand as Pay Per View Specials. Capstone promoted and produced a Ray Charles Holiday/Gospel Concert in December 2002 which Benjamin produced and directed. Benjamin also produced the album from that concert.

Benjamin produced an album for soul singer Tasha Taylor, who is the daughter of Johnnie Taylor, a blues and soul musician from Dallas Texas.

Benjamin is currently co-producing a Broadway play with Concord Music Group about the history and music of Stax Records. The book is written by Matthew Benjamin. In March 2016, Benjamin and Concord Music Group produced a four-week showcase in Memphis, Tennessee.

=== Personal life ===
Benjamin has two children. His son, Matthew Benjamin, is a playwright and screenwriter. His daughter, Jennifer Benjamin Teeman, is also a successful writer and was a senior editor for Cosmopolitan. Having two grandsons, Daniel Grant Teeman and Miles Teeman

== Filmography ==
=== Producer ===
- Teenage Father—1978
- Against All Odds—1984
- White Nights—1985
- Billy Galvin—1986
- La Bamba—1987
- Everybody's All-American—1988
- Rooftops—1989
- The Long Walk Home—1990
- Queens Logic—1991
- Mortal Thoughts—1991
- Defenseless—1991
- Sweet Talker—1991
- Betrayal of Trust—1994
- Sodbusters—1994
- The Abduction—1996
- Safe House—1998
- Corduroy—2000
- Ray—2004

== Music ==
- Ray Charles Celebrates a Gospel Christmas Album—2003
- Ray Soundtrack—2004
- Sam Moore Overnight Sensational Soundtrack—2006
- Musical Cast Album for "Unchain My Heart.....The Life and Music of Ray Charles—2014

== Theatre ==
- Louis and Keely Live at the Sahara—2009
- Ray Charles Live at the Pasadena Playhouse —2007
- Broadway Musical Unchain My Heart.....The Life and Music of Ray Charles—2014
