= Corduroy (TV series) =

2000 Canadian children's television series

- Genre: Children's; Animated series Cartoon; Comedy
- Created by: Betty Quan; Lin Oliver; Eduardo Soriano
- Based on: Corduroy; A Pocket for Corduroy by Don Freeman
- Developed by: Betty Quan
- Directed by: Eduardo Soriano
- Theme music composer: Ray Parker; Tom Szcezsniak
- Composer: Amin Bhatia
- Countries of origin: Canada; China
- Original language: English
- No. of episodes: 13 (26 segments)

Production
- Executive producers: Michael Hirsh; Patrick Loubert; Clive A. Smith; Tony Hwang; Lin Oliver; Stuart Benjamin; Alise Benjamin
- Running time: 11 minutes
- Production companies: Nelvana Limited; Sichuan Top Animation Co., Ltd.; Viacom Productions

Original release
- Network: PBS Kids (United States); TVOKids (Canada)
- Release: September 30, 2000 – February 24, 2001

Corduroy is a 2000 animated children's television series based on Don Freeman's 1968 children's book Corduroy and its 1978 follow-up A Pocket for Corduroy. It is the second animated adaptation of Corduroy following the 1997 VHS series The Adventures of Corduroy. The show originally aired for one season on TVOKids in Canada and PBS Kids Bookworm Bunch in the U.S. in 2000. After the final episode, repeats were aired until October 28, 2001, when it was cancelled along with Elliot Moose. The show consists of 26 10-minute stories, which were broadcast in pairs as 13 21-minute episodes. Corduroy appeared on the PBS Kids Bookworm Bunch in his own segment.

== Overview ==
The story is set in New York, USA, and follows the teddy bear Corduroy (whose personality is similar to a preschool child) and his owner and best friend Lisa, an 8-year-old schoolgirl of Jamaican heritage. Lisa lives with her mother in an unnamed big city. Corduroy's toy friends are: Buckaroo the rocking horse and Rosetta the wind-up mouse (whose personalities—like Corduroy—are also similar to a preschool child).

== Voice cast and characters ==
Adapted from end credits:

- Asa Perlman as Corduroy, Lisa's teddy bear
- Alisha Morrison (credited as Alesha Morrison) as Lisa, Corduroy's owner and human friend
- Jake Goldsbie as Marty "Moppy", Lisa's best friend and the good main character from the children's book Mop Top, and it was based by Don Freeman
- Camille James as Lisa's Mom
- Diane Fabian as Rosetta, a French-accented wind-up mouse
- Len Carlson as Buckaroo, the old rocking horse

Uncredited:

- Tony Daniels as Moppy's Dad
- Camille James as Mrs. Chau, a kindhearted Chinese lady who takes care of flowers and has a pet cat named Kit.
- Linda Ballantyne as Moppy's Mom
- Neil Crone as Greengrocer Man (Yours, Mine and Ours/Finders Keepers)
- Noah Reid as Greengrocer Boy (Yours, Mine and Ours/Finders Keepers)
- Keith Knight as Dinosaurs (1 + 1 = 2)
- Annick Obonsawin as Brown-haired boy (wearing a red school uniform) (Super Duper Market)

== Crew ==
Adapted from end credits:

- Executive Producers: Michael Hirsh, Patrick Loubert, Clive A. Smith, Tony Hwang, Lin Oliver, Stuart Benjamin, Alise Benjamin
- Supervising Producers: Stephen Hodgins, Jocelyn Hamilton, Patricia R. Burns
- Associate Producer: Marika Kocaba
- Producer: Blair Peters
- Director: Eduardo Soriano
- Assistant Director: Lyn Hart
- Post-Production Director: Laura Shepherd
- Story Editor and Developer: Betty Quan
- Voice Casting Director: Debra Toffan
- Casting administrator: Karyn Tester
- Casting Co-ordinator: Christine Geddes
- Casting Assistant: Carrie Justason
- Recording Assistants: Kerry Bones, Edmond Chan
- Production Supervisor: Ruta Cube
- Production Managers: Judy Leung, Sauching Ng
- Production Co-ordinators: Nancy Graham, Wendy Courtney
- Production Assistant: Stephen Lategan
- Script Co-ordinator: Karen Moonah
- Storyboard Artists: Paul Dedi, Dave Mah, Ken Davis, Trent Larson, Samuel To, Don Boone, John Delaney, Marvin Tabo Estropia
- Storyboard Clean-Up Artists: Sherwin Macario, Tobias Anker, Kiyoshi Kohatsu, Jenny Haskins, David Ian Philip
- Storyboard Co-ordinator: Allan Parker
- Designers: Bernard Lizon, Dave Walters, Lil Reichmann, Dan Hughes, Meagan Brown, Ryan Heshka, Stuart Wenschlag, Dallas Parker
- Design Clean-Up: Mary Leier, Victoria Goldner, John Beveridge
- F/X Designer: James M. Clow
- Design Co-ordinator: Athena Cho
- Background Artists: Peter Mong, Jamie Tainton, Susan Erlich
- Colour Stylist: Tara Miller
- Director's Notes: Mars Cabrera, Sherann Johnson
- Lip Sync: Cathy Parkes, Cathy Luker
- Layout Supervisor: Chris Minz
- Animation Supervisor: Greg Woods
- Pre-Production Supervisors: Liza Wespi, Robert Watts
- Pre-Production Editing: Jodi Reichmuth, Chad Van De Keere, Joli Rogers
- Pre-Production Assistant: Mike Thorpe
- Pre-Production Sound: Dick & Roger's Sound Studio
- Dialogue Assembly: Ken Lomas, Alex Verdecchia
- Pre-Production Checker: Steve MacVittie
- Director Post-Production: Rob Kirkpatrick
- G.M. Post-Production: Joe Scrivo
- Post-Production Manager: Nancy E. Black
- Post Audio Supervisor: Steven Cole
- Post-Production Administrator: Ann McGuire
- Post-Production Co-ordinator: Brian Marsh
- Post-Production Assistants: Chris Stearman, Michael Goldsmith, Joey Aguiar
- Picture Editor: Simon Marcroft
- Assistant Picture Editor: Mike Goodings
- Online Editor: Andy Hunter
- Mixer: John Carey
- Theme: Ray Parker, Tom Szczesniak
- Music: Amin Bhatia
- Music Supervisor: Stephen Hudecki
- Music Assistant: Helena Werren
- Music Editor: Steve Shelski
- Dialogue Editor: Simon Giles
- Sound Effect Editors: Steve Gardner, Taissa Prychodko
- Business & Legal Affairs: Suzanne L. Cross
- Educational Consultant: Miki Baumgarten

== Episodes ==
No.	Title	Original release date
1a	"Lost and Found"	September 30, 2000
Corduroy's first ride on the city subway is full of exciting sights and sounds. But when Lisa becomes distracted, and does not keep an eye out for Corduroy as she should, she and her toy teddy bear get separated. Now it's up to both Lisa and Corduroy to come up with a solution for finding each other.
1b	"Going Up"	September 30, 2000
The apartment building elevator's out of order. For an energetic kid like Lisa, this doesn't pose much of a problem. But for some other tenants, such as the elderly, new mothers, and Moppy's Dad, who twisted his ankle, the stairs are a problem. Lisa and Corduroy provide a helping hand and sturdy legs to those in need of assistance.
2a	"Good Night Corduroy"	October 7, 2000
Corduroy just can't-or won't-get to sleep. He's thirsty, his pillow needs fluffing, he's cold, now he's hot. But what Corduroy won't admit is he's afraid of the dark. Lisa helps Corduroy overcome his fear by sharing her own past nighttime worries, and how she resolved them.
2b	"Soap Flakes"	October 7, 2000
Lisa's missing scissors and a messy linen closet (caused by Corduroy and Buckaroo when they are caught by Lisa playing in it) in separate incidents, Moppy and Corduroy learn that telling lies can usually bring a whole new mess of problems.
3a	"Ice Dream"	October 14, 2000
It's the year's first snowfall, and of all things, Lisa and Corduroy are craving ice cream. Lisa's allowance is spent already, so Mom suggests Lisa use her own initiative to earn money to buy this snack. Lisa comes up with a great idea: she can clear her neighbours' sidewalks of snow!
3b	"Special Delivery"	October 14, 2000
Corduroy (who is left out at home because Lisa is at school) ventures downstairs on his own to put a card to Lisa in the lobby mailbox after she surprises him with a "thinking of you" card.
4a	"Clean Up"	October 21, 2000
The local park is so full of trash and discarded pop cans that even the poor ducks can't swim around in their pond. Lisa and Corduroy, along with their friends and neighbours, pitch in to help tidy up the park. But, as Lisa discovers, organization is the key to a successful clean up.
4b	"Music Lesson"	October 21, 2000
Lisa thinks there's only one kind of music worth listening to, hip-hop. But how can Lisa be so sure when she's never really given other styles of music a chance? By pointing out all the music heard on their very own neighbourhood block-Indian, waltz, even men playing silver spoons - Corduroy and Rosetta soon have Lisa dancing to the different rhythms of the street.
5a	"Ship Ahoy"	October 28, 2000
A picnic in the park ends up becomes something else entirely when Corduroy ends up sailing solo on Moppy's toy boat. Moppy had promised Lisa he'd take care of Corduroy and now Corduroy's missing!
5b	"Help Wanted"	October 28, 2000
Mom's in bed with a cold, so Lisa offers to make lunch. It'll be Lisa's first time preparing a meal on her own, and Mom has very clear instructions for Lisa to follow. But in the excitement of being a chef, Lisa bypasses a simple peanut butter and jelly sandwich for an improvised pasta salad, featuring a dressing made out of prune juice, in spite of Corduroy's objections to Lisa's ideas!
6a	"Flight of Fancy"	November 4, 2000
What a beautiful day for kite flying. Moppy and Lisa revel in watching their kite's soar with the breeze, until their competitive spirits rise too. They are so keen on flying their kites higher than the other's, their kite's end up stuck in a tree. Now working together, the pair constructs one kite out of makeshift parts, and Corduroy is given a soaring ride in the sky.
6b	"1 + 1 = 2"	November 4, 2000
Lisa has spent her day at school learning about dinosaurs, and now she's going to build her own dinosaur out of pipe cleaners. Corduroy decides he's going to make a dinosaur too, out of felt. When Lisa meets her pipe cleaner dinosaur in her imagination, the dinosaur is terribly cold. When Corduroy meets his felt dinosaur in his imagination, the dinosaur is terribly wobbly. But by working together, and making one dinosaur out of both pipe cleaners and felt, they construct the perfect Stegosaurus.
7a	"Cute as a Button"	November 11, 2000
Lisa loses a race to Moppy and wonders if his smart-looking sneakers are the reason why. After all, her sneakers are so plain and boring. Corduroy, meanwhile, has lost a button, and worries that Lisa won't love him as much if he doesn't look his best. Both Lisa and Corduroy discover that appearance isn't everything. What's inside counts.
7b	"Sleep Tight"	November 11, 2000
Sometimes we're ready to try something new, but it's okay if we're not, as Moppy discovers when he visits Lisa for his first-over sleepover.
8a	"Toothache"	November 18, 2000
Lisa doesn't tell Mom about her toothache, for fear a visit to the dentist's office will mean a big needle. But when Corduroy comes to Lisa about his hurt elbow, Lisa realizes the importance of asking for help when help is needed.
8b	"Mop Top"	November 18, 2000
Change isn't easy to accept. Just ask Moppy and Corduroy. Moppy is delaying a dreaded visit to the Barber's for a much needed haircut. And Corduroy worries that his new blanket means he has to give up his old, treasured blanket. Lisa finds a way to help reassure both her friends.
9a	"Art Smart"	November 25, 2000
A visit to Lisa's Mom's art gallery has Lisa, Corduroy, and Rosetta each making art. But Rosetta becomes jealous when she hears Lisa tell Corduroy she loves his sculpture. The consequences of jealousy become apparent when Rosetta accidentally damages Corduroy's sculpture, and ends up destroying her very own painting as well.
9b	"A Hot Day in the City"	November 25, 2000
Whew! What a hot day in the city! It's too late in the afternoon to take Corduroy to the beach, so Lisa decides to bring the beach to Corduroy! They transform their very own fire escape into a beach haven, using ingenuity and their imaginations to stay cool.
10a	"Yours, Mine and Ours"	February 3, 2001
A neighbourhood block party has everyone out in heritage dress, dishing up ethnic cuisine. Moppy eats his way through the party, rudely pushing ahead of line-ups, and eagerly grabbing more than his share of food samples. Not only is Lisa is disturbed by Moppy's greedy behavior, she's finding Corduroy is also being a little selfish, unwilling to share a piñata they won together in a contest.
10b	"Say Cheese"	February 3, 2001
Mrs. Cho gives Lisa a disposable instant camera, and Lisa zestfully sneaks up on her friends in the apartment building, taking snapshots of them in embarrassing poses (such as Mom in curlers and face cream). When, to her displeasure, Corduroy starts snooping around in her cedar chest, Lisa realizes she hasn't been respecting other people's privacy, and starts asking friends' permission before taking their photographs.
11a	"Once, Twice, Ice"	February 10, 2001
It's Lisa's first time trying to ice skate at the city's public rink, and she can hardly wait to try out the swirls and twirls she's seen seasoned skaters perform. But Lisa's first gig on the ice is less than graceful, and she gives up before she's ever really started. When helping teach Corduroy how to do a somersault, Lisa understands the importance of perseverance and decides to try skating again.
11b	"Sticks and Stones"	February 10, 2001
Nicknames can hurt. And Lisa and Corduroy find out while they are in during exuberant play. Lisa takes to calling Moppy "Sloppy Toppy", Moppy takes to calling Lisa "Lisa Pizza", Corduroy takes to calling Buckaroo "Stuckaroo", and Buckaroo takes to calling Corduroy a "boo-boo head".
12a	"Super Duper Market"	February 17, 2001
A visit to the supermarket has Lisa and Corduroy very excited. So excited they aren't paying attention to what's around them, as they play at the automatic sliding doors, almost drop jars of food, or practically start a shopping cart traffic jam. As Mom points out, it's better to be safe than sorry.
12b	"Party Plans"	February 17, 2001
With Buckaroo and Rosetta's help, Lisa plans a special surprise party for Corduroy-to celebrate the day she brought him home from the department store! Unaware of these party plans, Corduroy feels unwanted and abandoned, mistakenly thinking his friends have decided they don't want to play with him anymore.
13a	"Finder's Keepers"	February 24, 2001
Lisa finds a lost puppy and decides to keep him. But "finders keepers" does not always hold true, as Lisa realizes when she remembers how it felt to lose Corduroy on the subway and decides to seek the puppy's rightful owner.
13b	"Between the Covers"	February 24, 2001
Reading and hearing stories read aloud bring great joy to Corduroy and Lisa. But when Lisa is allowed her very own library card, and misplaces a book, they realize that responsibility comes with the privilege of borrowing books.

== Telecast and home media ==
All Corduroy episodes were officially released onto YouTube as of 2013 on Treehouse TV's channel.
