= The Tangerine Bear =

- Directed by: Bert Ring
- Written by: Betty Paraskevas; Michael Paraskevas
- Produced by: Mark McGroarty
- Starring: Jonathan Taylor Thomas; Jenna Elfman; Howie Mandel; David Hyde Pierce; Tom Bosley; Jon Polito; David Lander
- Narrated by: Trisha Yearwood
- Edited by: Jeff Patch
- Music by: Randall Crissman
- Production companies: Hyperion Animation; Family Home Entertainment
- Distributed by: Artisan Home Entertainment
- Release date: November 11, 2000
- Running time: 60 minutes
- Country: United States
- Language: English

The Tangerine Bear is a 2000 animated direct-to-video film produced by Hyperion Pictures for Family Home Entertainment. It was released by Artisan Home Entertainment on November 11, 2000. It was directed by Bert Ring, and is based on the 1997 book of the same name by Betty Paraskevas and Michael Paraskevas. The voice cast includes famous celebrities Tom Bosley, Jenna Elfman, Howie Mandel, David Hyde Pierce, Jonathan Taylor Thomas, Ralph Manza, and Marlon Wayans. The story is narrated and sung by country/western singer Trisha Yearwood. It was produced by Family Home Entertainment and Hyperion Pictures, and distributed by Artisan Entertainment. Entertainment Rights handled international sales of the film.

== Plot ==
A teddy bear on a conveyor belt in a toy factory is knocked over by a mouse, resulting in his mouth being sewn upside-down in a frown, unlike his brothers and sisters who are sewn with smiles on their faces. They are taken to Krolls' Department Store. The bear (Jonathan Taylor Thomas) becomes upset when all the kids eventually take all the bears except for him. Not knowing he looks different, he wonders why no one will buy him.

Soon, the bear is placed in the store's discount box with a blue monkey named Louie Blue (Marlon Wayans) and a pull-string doll in a pink dress named Dolly (Clea Montville), who are eventually bought. Then he is dumped into a chest full of old and broken junk and brought to the tiny antique shop, Winkle's Emporium. The store owner, Mr. Winkle (Tom Bosley), notices the bear and places him on his window display with Bird (David Hyde Pierce), an agoraphobic cuckoo clock, Lorelei (Jenna Elfman), a mermaid alarm clock, and Jack (Howie Mandel), a claustrophobic jack-in-the-box.

The bear's new friends warn him not to go near Winkle's nasty dog Virgil (Jon Polito), but he wants a chair to sit on so someone may notice him. He carefully gets down from the display but is chased by Virgil, creating a huge mess. Mr. Winkle finds the bear and gives him a tiny chair to sit on back on the window display. As time passes, the bear and his friends realize that the sun has turned his body orange or "tangerine". From then on the bear is called "Tangie".

One day, Virgil escapes with a gang of mischievous dogs when a customer comes into the shop. Winkle is happy after selling Lorelei to the first customer to visit his store in a long time but remains worried about Virgil. Once Winkle goes to sleep upstairs, Tangie, Bird and Jack notice Virgil freezing cold in the snow and whimpering. Jack and Bird are reluctant and refuse to help Tangie rescue Virgil at first, but after saving him, Virgil becomes loyal to his new "friends".

It's Christmas time again, and Tangie and Virgil help Bird and Jack decorate Winkle's window display with Christmas ornaments and lights. Virgil takes his friends for a wagon ride to check out River Street's other Christmas lights. However, once their trip is over, Jack, Virgil, and Bird discover that Tangie fell off the wagon on the way back to Winkle's and is missing. When Tangie tries to make it back to Winkles through the snow, he is suddenly picked up and carried back to Winkles shop by someone he believes is Santa Claus, ready to finally take him to a loving home. It is really Mr. Winkle dressed up, however, and he takes him back to the shop, to Tangie and the rest of the toys' disappointment.

The next day, a man who tells Winkle that he had lost his way in the snowstorm appears at his window. The man expresses interest in Jack and Tangie for their unusual qualities and offers Mr. Winkle $200 for them. Winkle quickly tells the man that both Jack and Tangie are not for sale, since they are "his only family". Tangie realizes how nice it is to be at "home" with his wonderful family, and learns just from that being different makes each of us special.

== Voice cast ==
- Jonathan Taylor Thomas as Tangie
- Jenna Elfman as Lorelei
- Howie Mandel as Jack
- David Hyde Pierce as Bird
- Marlon Wayans as Louie Blue
- Tom Bosley as Mr. Winkle
- Jon Polito as Virgil
- Trisha Yearwood as The Narrator
- David Lander as Theodore, Store Clerk
- Orlando Brown as Bear #2, Little Boy #3
- Jeannie Elias as Bear #1, Little Boy #2
- Martin Grey as Customer, Truck Driver
- Keith Langsdale as Stranger, Radio Announcer
- Ralph Manza as Rico, Factory Worker
- Clea Montville as Dolly
- Donna Pieroni as Mama
- Charlotte Rae as Mrs. Caruthers
- Aaron Spann as Little Boy On Santa's Lap
- Camille Winbush as Bear #3, Little Girl

== Production ==
In July 2000, it was announced Artisan Entertainment would produce and distribute The Tangerine Bear, an animated special animated by Hyperion Pictures and adapted from the children's book of the same name. Prior to release Artisan secured several promotional partners and voiced their intent on turning the film into a franchise.

== Release ==
The film was included in the UK DVD compilation "Children's Christmas Collection", where the film was featured alongside other Entertainment Rights-owned material. However, the film was heavily edited down to 22 minutes.

== Songs ==
- Looking for a Place to Belong - Trisha Yearwood
- We Gotta Get Sold, We Gotta Get Bought - The Bears
- Whatever Happened to My Smile - Amick Byram
- Oh Getting Ready for Christmas Day - Trisha Yearwood
