= Rooftops (film) =

- Theatrical release poster
- Directed by: Robert Wise
- Screenplay by: Terence Brennan
- Story by: Allan A. Goldstein; Tony Mark
- Produced by: Stuart Benjamin
- Starring: Jason Gedrick; Troy Beyer; Eddie Velez; Tisha Campbell
- Cinematography: Theo van de Sande
- Music by: Michael Kamen; David A. Stewart
- Distributed by: New Visions Pictures
- Release date: March 17, 1989
- Running time: 95 minutes
- Country: United States
- Language: English
- Budget: $7–8 million
- Box office: $2,043,889

Rooftops is a 1989 American crime and dance musical drama film directed by Robert Wise, which follows the misadventures of two homeless teenagers in Manhattan.

Rooftops was the last theatrical motion picture directed by Wise and the second of his films about poor young New Yorkers, the first being the famous West Side Story.

== Plot ==
Squeak, the main character's best friend has tagged the wrong place and a local crew of misfits seeks to teach him a lesson. A chase ensues through the streets of New York City, through abandoned buildings and on rooftops. Squeak is finally cornered before his best friend and the film's main hero, T, comes to his rescue. The rest of the film focuses on T and his group of friends, among them a reformed prostitute, a young woman, and a deaf basketball player.

T is famous among the neighbourhood for taking place in a dance called "combat" in which "combatants" attempt to force each other off of a square fighting surface through only intimidation, no contact is allowed. T falls in love with Elana and she reciprocates his feelings. T is also exposed to Capoeira, which he naturally compares to his own fighting style.

The main antagonists are a group of drug dealers who are slowly taking over the city's abandoned buildings, stringing out the local youth and establishing themselves as the law of the streets. Squeak crosses the drug dealers and pays for it with his life. The rest of the movie follows T and his friends quest for redemption at the hands of the drug dealers, and ends in a climactic rooftop battle.

== Cast ==
- Jason Gedrick as "T"
- Troy Beyer as Elena
- Eddie Velez as "Lobo"
- Tisha Campbell as Amber
- Alexis Cruz as "Squeak"
- Allen Payne as Kadim
- Steve Love as Jackie "Sky"
- Rafael Baez as Raphael
- Jaime Tirelli as Officer Rivera
- Luis Guzmán as Martinez
- Millie Tirelli as Squeak's Mother
- Robert LaSardo as "Blade"
- Jay Boryea as Willie
- Rockets Redglare as Carlos
- Edouard DeSoto as Angelo
- John Canada Terrell as Junkie Cop
- Bruce Smolanoff as "Bones"
- Paul Herman as Jimmy
- Edythe Jason as Lois
- Lauren Tom as Audry
- Stuart Rudin as Wino
- Coley Wallace as Lester
- Herb Kerr as Jorge
- Peter Lopez as "Burn"
- Kurt Lott as "Zit"
- Jed James as "X"

== Critical reception ==
The film was not well-received by critics. The film has a composite score of 10% on Rotten Tomatoes from 20 reviews. Roger Ebert opined that the film was unrealistic and sugarcoated the grim realities facing homeless teenagers.

== Soundtrack ==
The music credits included the title song "Rooftops" performed by Jeffrey Osborne, "Avenue D," performed by Etta James, featuring David A. Stewart, and Bullet Proof Heart, written and produced by Grace Jones.

Rooftops soundtrack
No.	Title	Writer(s)	Performer	Length
1.	"Avenue D"	David A. Stewart; Etta James; Richard Feldman	Etta James featuring David A. Stewart	4:28
2.	"Freedom"	Patrick Seymour	Pat Seymour	3:49
3.	"Drop"	George Chandler; Jimmy Chambers; Jimmy Helms; William Henshall	London Beat	3:51
4.	"Loving Number One"	Vince Hudson; Jude Hudson	Kisses From The Kremlin	3:50
5.	"Meltdown"	Stewart; Michael Kamen	Joniece Jamison	4:50
6.	"Rooftops"	Stewart; Seymour; Feldman	Jeffrey Osborne	3:51
7.	"Revenge (Part II)"	Stewart; Annie Lennox	Eurythmics	4:15
8.	"Stretch"	Stewart; Charlie Wilson	Charlie Wilson	4:13
9.	"Bullet Proof Heart"	Grace Jones; Chris Stanley	Grace Jones	4:25
10.	"Keep Runnin"	Robert Reed; James Avery	Trouble Funk	3:38
Total length:				41:10

== Home media release ==
Rooftops was first released on VHS and Laserdisc in 1989 by International Video Entertainment.

Platinum Disc released the film onto DVD in 2002, but the DVD was in full screen and did not contain any bonus material. That DVD has since been discontinued.

The current DVD is a double feature release with A Midsummer Night's Rave.
