= On the Edge of the Sea =

1992 children's book

- Author: Betty Paraskevas
- Illustrator: Michael Paraskevas
- Language: English
- Genre: Children's literature
- Publisher: Dial Books
- Publication date: September 8, 1992
- Publication place: United States
- Pages: 32
- ISBN: 978-0803711303

On the Edge of the Sea is a 1992 children's book written by Betty Paraskevas and illustrated by Michael Paraskevas. Using rhymes and acrylic paintings, the book describes a boy's dream of living in a sand castle by the sea.

== Plot ==
In the book, a boy narrates his dream of living in a sand castle on the shore. He begins his day by watching the sun rise and greeting his friends who have come to spend the day at the beach. They relax under the sun, play in the waves, and fly kites, while he serves them food. He later recalls how beach balls fill up the sky and how an iceberg was approaching the beach. At evening time, everyone leaves while he retreats to his castle. He climbs up the castle to greet the moon but in doing so, a breeze blows his hat away and he trips over the edge and falls; while falling, his mother wakes him up from the dream. At the end, the narrator, as an adult, fondly thinks of the dream and questions why he never found his hat.

== Background and style ==
Michael Paraskevas worked as an illustrator for magazines including Time and Sports Illustrated. In addition, his beach paintings were displayed at Giraffics Gallery in East Hampton, New York. His mother, Betty, wrote the book's rhyme while using some of his paintings. Newsday's Eileen Swift indicated that the book cover is "everyone's nostalgic memory of sun, sand, beach and sand castles of long ago". The events of On the Edge of the Sea are described using acrylic paintings in "clear" and "glowing" tones and rhyming couplets. Publishers Weekly thought that the style was inspired by "the joyful naivete of folk art and the whimsy of such surrealists as Rene Magritte".

== Reception ==
Swift said that On the Edge of the Sea is a "catchy rhyming tale". Rosemary Black of the New York Daily News called the book's illustrations "dazzling" and noted that the book is "one of the most refreshing ways to soak up the sun". In the Pittsburgh Post-Gazette, Karen MacPherson wrote that with On the Edge of the Sea, the reader enjoys "a lovely summer day at the beach" and that the ending has a "powerful emotional punch".

Publishers Weekly praised Michael's paintings for being "a genuine pleasure" and labeled On the Edge of the Sea a "thoroughly winning debut". Writing for the School Library Journal, Joy Fleishhacker deemed the poem uninventive and said that the artworks have a "repetitive layout". She concluded that since "neither verbal nor visual images" are exceptionally memorable, "this day at the beach" is "easy to forget". Both Publishers Weekly and Fleishhacker were ambivalent towards Betty's lyricism.
