= Corduroy (book) =

1968 children's picture book by Don Freeman

- Cover art
- Author: Don Freeman
- Illustrator: Don Freeman
- Cover artist: Freeman
- Language: English
- Genre: Children's literature, picture book
- Publisher: Viking Press
- Publication date: 1968
- Publication place: United States
- Media type: Hardcover
- Pages: 32
- ISBN: 0-590-30907-2
- Preceded by: N/A
- Followed by: A Pocket for Corduroy

Corduroy is a 1968 children's book written and illustrated by Don Freeman, and published by The Viking Press. Based on a 2007 online poll, the US National Education Association listed the book as one of its "Teachers' Top 100 Books for Children." It was one of the "Top 100 Picture Books" of all time in a 2012 poll by School Library Journal. The book is about the titular character, a sentient teddy bear, in a department store whose name refers to the corduroy outfit he is wearing.

== History ==
Don Freeman explained that he had an idea of writing a story taking place in a department store, in which a character wanders around after the doors close. He wanted the storyline to portray a difference between the luxury of such department store and the simple life most people live, at the same time highlighting basic values. The bear's name was derived from another children's book by Freeman, Corduroy, the Inferior Decorator, which tells about a boy driving his parents crazy by painting on their apartment's walls. The book was never published, but Freeman reused the boy's name when writing Corduroy. Secondly, it has been reported that the name Corduroy had been a nickname for his son, Roy.

The book was rejected when first sent to Freeman's publisher, The Viking Press. The writer then sent it to a number of other publishers, who also provided him with negative feedback. Freeman presented the book once again to The Viking Press and was finally given a chance.

Don Freeman wrote a sequel, A Pocket for Corduroy, in 1978 but died before it was published. In 2006, children's book author B. G. Hennessy published Corduroy Lost and Found as a sequel to Don Freeman's earlier works. A special 40th anniversary edition of Corduroy was released in 2008. Actress Viola Davis wrote a sequel, Corduroy Takes a Bow, which was published by Penguin Random House on September 4, 2018.

== Plot ==
A teddy bear in overalls named Corduroy is displayed in the toy section of a large department store. Every day, he hopes that someone will buy him and keep him as their own. One day, a young girl arrives at the store with her mother and spots the bear. She is eager to buy him, but her mother refuses to spend more money and points out that the bear is missing a button on his overalls. The girl and her mother leave.

That night, when the shoppers and employees have gone, Corduroy decides to find the missing button himself and goes on a trip around the department store. He marvels at an escalator, which he takes to the furniture section of the department store. Corduroy marvels at the furniture and crawls onto a bed, where he sees one of the mattress's button-like tufts and thinks it is his missing button. Corduroy pulls on it with such force that he topples off the bed and accidentally knocks over a lamp. A security guard hears the crash and rushes to the scene, finding Corduroy, whom he returns to the toy section.

Early the next day, the girl comes back with money she had found in her piggy bank. She introduces herself as Lisa and buys Corduroy. At home, she sews a button onto Corduroy's overalls, after which Lisa and Corduroy hug, acknowledging how they are glad to have found a friend.

== Adaptations ==
- Corduroy was made into a short live-action movie in 1984 by Weston Woods and Evergreen/Firehouse Productions. The movie was also released on DVD in 2003.
- In 1997, a direct-to-video animated series, The Adventures of Corduroy, was produced, which ran until 1999.
- In 2000, another animated Corduroy TV series was produced in Canada, which ran on PBS Kids until 2001.
- On November 14, 2016, it was announced that Tim Story will direct a film adaptation of the story for CBS Films, and Walden Media will co-develop the project with Jack and Kate Angelo writing the script.
- A stage adaptation was produced by Children's Theatre Company in 2018.

== See also ==
- 1968 in literature
