= Betty Paraskevas =

American writer (1929–2010)

- Born: Rita E. Paraskevas; April 8, 1929; Linden, New Jersey, U.S.
- Died: April 7, 2010 (aged 80); Southampton, New York, U.S.
- Education: Douglass Residential College
- Occupations: Writer; lyricist
- Notable work: Maggie and the Ferocious Beast; Marvin the Tap-Dancing Horse; The Kids from Room 402; The Tangerine Bear
- Spouse: Paul Paraskevas (m. 1956; died 2001)
- Children: 2, including Michael

Rita E. "Betty" Paraskevas (April 8, 1929 – April 7, 2010) was a New York-based writer and lyricist best known for her work on Maggie and the Ferocious Beast, adapted into an animated television series and produced by the Canada-based studio Nelvana Limited.

== Early life, career and death ==
Born in Linden, New Jersey, Paraskevas attended the Douglass Residential College and majored in chemistry. Before becoming a children's author, she worked for many years as a playwright and lyricist on Broadway, working with producer Harry Rigby on shows such as Sugar Babies and No, No, Nanette.

She married Paul Paraskevas in 1956, with whom she had twins Judith and Michael. The couple relocated to Roselle Park, New Jersey where they raised the children. Paul died in 2001.

Betty Paraskevas moved to Southampton in the mid-1980s. Her collaborations with Michael began in the early 1990s when Michael – already a successful illustrator – encouraged her to write a story which he could then illustrate. They produced On the Edge of the Sea, which was published by Dial Books in 1992. Their second book, also written by her, was Junior Kroll. Published in 1993, it led to their first series. The pair produced over 20 books, three of which were turned into television series and aired on networks such as Nickelodeon.

Paraskevas died on April 7, 2010, from complications due to pancreatic cancer; in Southampton, New York, one day before her 81st birthday.

== Bibliography ==
With Michael Paraskevas, unless otherwise noted

- On the Edge of the Sea (Dial Books, 1992)
- Junior Kroll (HMH Books for Young Readers, 1993)
- Shamlanders (Harcourt Children's Books, 1993)
- The Strawberry Dog (Dial Books, 1993)
- Junior Kroll and Company (Harcourt Brace & Company, 1994)
- A Very Kroll Christmas (Harcourt Children's Books, 1994)
- Gracie Graves and the Kids from Room 402 (Harcourt Children's Books, 1995) — adapted into The Kids from Room 402
- Cecil Bunions and the Midnight Train (Harcourt Children's Books, 1996)
- The Ferocious Beast with the Polka-Dot Hide (Harcourt Children's Books, 1996) — adapted into Maggie and the Ferocious Beast
- The Tangerine Bear (HarperCollins Children's Books, 1997) — adapted into The Tangerine Bear
- Hoppy and Joe (Simon & Schuster Children's Publishing, 1999)
- Maggie and the Ferocious Beast: The Big Scare (Simon & Schuster Children's Publishing, 1999)
- The Big Carrot: A Maggie and the Ferocious Beast Book (Simon & Schuster Children's Publishing, 2000)
- On the Day the Tall Ships Sailed (Simon & Schuster Children's Publishing, 2000)
- Nibbles O'Hare (Simon & Schuster Children's Publishing, 2001)
- Marvin the Tap-Dancing Horse (Simon & Schuster Children's Publishing, 2001) — adapted into Marvin the Tap-Dancing Horse
- The Green Monkeys (Paraskevas Gallery, 2002)
