= Maggie and the Ferocious Beast =

Canadian animated children's television series (2000-2002)

- Genre: Fantasy; Comedy
- Created by: Michael Paraskevas; Betty Paraskevas
- Based on: The Ferocious Beast with the Polka-Dot Hide by: Michael Paraskevas; Betty Paraskevas
- Developed by: Betty Quan
- Directed by: Jamie Whitney; Stuart Shankly (season 3)
- Voices of: Kristen Bone; Stephen Ouimette; Michael Caruana
- Opening theme: "Maggie and the Ferocious Beast in Nowhere Land" performed by Isabella Molley
- Country of origin: Canada
- Original language: English
- No. of seasons: 3
- No. of episodes: 39 (117 segments) (list of episodes)

Production
- Executive producers: Michael Hirsh; Patrick Loubert; Clive A. Smith; Michael Paraskevas; Betty Paraskevas
- Producer: Sally Han (season 3)
- Editors: Stephanie Duncan (season 1); Ian Newport (season 2); Martin Jefferson (season 3)
- Running time: 22 minutes
- Production company: Nelvana Limited

Original release
- Network: Teletoon
- Release: August 26, 2000 – June 9, 2002

Maggie and the Ferocious Beast is a Canadian animated children's television series created by Michael and Betty Paraskevas. The program was based on the 1996 book The Ferocious Beast with the Polka-Dot Hide and its sequels, which were also written by the Paraskevas. The show started off as a series of shorts aired on Nick Jr. and Teletoon in 1998. Two years later, the first full-length episode was first premiered on Nick Jr. on June 5, 2000, in the U.S. until premiering on Teletoon on August 26 of that same year in Canada. The show aired for three seasons, airing its final episode on June 9, 2002.

== Premise ==
A redheaded 5-year-old girl named Maggie creates her own map of an imaginary world known as Nowhere Land that, in reality, takes the characters nowhere. She imagines that the characters Beast and Hamilton Hocks are her best friends.

== Episodes ==
Season	Episodes	Originally released	
Season	Episodes	First released	Last released
1	13	August 26, 2000	September 7, 2000
2	13	April 7, 2001	October 7, 2001
3	13	March 9, 2002	June 9, 2002

== Characters ==
=== Main ===
- Maggie (voiced by Kristen Bone) is a 5-year-old girl with red hair (who later turns 6 years old) and the human protagonist of the show. She is Hamilton's and the Beast's best friend, who is very adventurous. They both look up to Maggie very much and always turn to her for advice. Maggie is the leader of the group and is always there to be the compassionate voice of reason to her dear friends.
- The Beast (voiced by Stephen Ouimette) appears ferocious, but is actually very gentle and kind. He is a big yellow dog-like creature, with big red removable spots, and three horns on his head; he's half-bear, half-pig, half-cow, half-elephant, with a human's head. His catchphrase is "Great googly moogly!", which he says numerous times per episode including towards the end of the opening sequence of the series. In the episode "Hide and Go Beast", it is shown that he is allergic to pollen. The Beast likes pretty much any kind of food, especially Hamilton's cooking. He even likes taking baths. He often wears multicolored galoshes which he pronounces as "Goo-lashes". Hamilton often corrects his pronunciation, but he does not believe him. Maggie and Hamilton are his best friends.
- Hamilton Hocks (voiced by Michael Caruana) is an anthropomorphic pig who can be kind of bossy and quite fussy, but he does have a warm heart. He lives inside a handheld cardboard box which he likes, is the best cook in Nowhere Land, and is a total-clean freak. Hamilton's most prized possessions are his handsome "H" sweater and his cardboard box, which also happens to be his home. In the episode "Hamilton the Ham", he has a great talent for singing. His catchphrase is "Hoo-wee!" Maggie and the Beast are his best friends.

=== Recurring ===
- Rudy (voiced by John McGrath) is a cheese-loving mouse who lives in a large wheel of cheese in a part of Nowhere Land called Cheese Town. It is revealed in one episode that Rudy's hat and boots don't come off because they are glued to him. This character started off with the name Pippy, but was renamed by the writers soon after.
- Nedley (voiced by Dwayne Hill) is a white rabbit who speaks in many rhymes. He says rhymes almost all through every episode that he appears in, but sometimes he talks normally a little before starting his rhyme again. Nedley lives in a rabbit hole next to his carrot patch in Nowhere Land.
- The Moo Sisters are the three cows who live in a part of Nowhere Land called Mooville. They all love to sing together and do it very often. They are sisters and their names are Millicent, Mavis and Marge.
- Mr. Moon is the only non-human and non-animal character in the episode "Blue Moon". He appears as a very grumpy character because people say he is made of green cheese even though it hasn't been proven.
- The Kindly Giant is the one who is not at all scary but instead kindhearted. The others are scared at first, but they soon get used to him and they sometimes go to him for advice or a favor. He refers to Maggie, Hamilton and the Beast as little ones. He owns a garden full of healthy food, from which he always lets the ever-hungry Beast wolf down a giant blueberry or two. His face is never shown, and he only appears in a few episodes. He is very big and strong. Even the Beast seems small compared to the giant. The Kindly Giant lives in an area of Nowhere Land where all the fruits and vegetables are giant-sized. Normally, only his shoes and ankles are seen because of his largeness.
- The Dream Sheep are white sheep that make baa sounds. They are occasionally up in the clouds.
- The Jellybean Team are a group of seven colored jellybeans. There is a red one, an orange one, a yellow one, a purple one, a black one and two green ones. They are very small, of course, but have big personalities. They also tend to argue with each other a lot because they each think they are more important than the others.
- The Triplets (all voiced by Julie Lemieux) are Maggie's baby cousins. Their names are Zack, Max & Oscar.
- Big Duck is a large duck with white feathers who lives in the water. She appears in the series' theme song.
- Reggie Van Beast (voiced by Dan Chameroy) is the Beast's cousin. His coloring is the inverse of the Beast's, being red with yellow spots rather than yellow with red, and he wears a monocle. Unlike the Beast, Reggie is rather stuck up and very rude, and he never really seems to enjoy anything that the Beast and his friends want to do. He also often speaks in rhymes, just like Nedley. His name is based on the character Reggie Van Gleason played by Jackie Gleason
- B. B. Katz is a tiger known for playing jazz music through his large bass. He lives within Mud Creek. His name is based on legendary blues musician, B. B. King.
- Mr. Shivers is a talking snowman who lives in the Nowhere Land mountain.
- Archie (voiced by Michael Caruana) is a Scottish-accented toy Scottish Terrier. He was introduced in the episode "Roll Over Archie", in which he tends to be hyperactive — much to the others' annoyance — resulting to him being turned off. However, considering their actions a bit hard, they turn him back on and apologize, admitting their annoyance. Archie's owner is unknown.

== Production ==
Maggie and the Ferocious Beast was produced by Nelvana Limited and with the participation of Teletoon, and directed by Jamie Whitney. Stuart Shankly entered as the director in season 3.

The show premiered in 2000 and aired its final episode in 2002.

== Telecast and home media ==
In Canada, the show aired on Teletoon (now known as "Cartoon Network Canada") and later Treehouse TV. In the U.S., prior to its Canadian premiere, the show aired on Nickelodeon as part of the preschool-aimed Nick Jr. programming block. On April 7, 2003, repeats began airing on Noggin. It continued to air on Noggin after its rebrand to Nick Jr. until October 30, 2010, when the show was pulled from its lineup. Qubo, which had been airing repeats of Marvin the Tap-Dancing Horse (another show created by the Paraskevas) on and off since its launch on January 8, 2007, picked up the show by May 28, 2018, and aired repeats until this channel gave out all operations on February 28, 2021, due to Scripps' acquisition. In the early 2000s, Columbia TriStar Home Entertainment released the show on VHS and DVD. Phase 4 Films' Kaboom! Entertainment in Canada and Shout! Factory in the U.S. released the show as well. Currently, the show is available for streaming on Tubi.

== Reboot ==
On March 18, 2021, it was announced that a revival was in the works. The 2D-animated reboot will be titled The Ferocious Beast Show and will be produced by US-based Frederator Studios. Production was scheduled to start in late 2021 for a 2022/2023 release. The show was co-created by Michael Paraskevas and his wife Maria Bruno, with Michael Hirsh as a producer. However as of 2026, there hasn't been any updates.
