= Don Freeman =

American artist

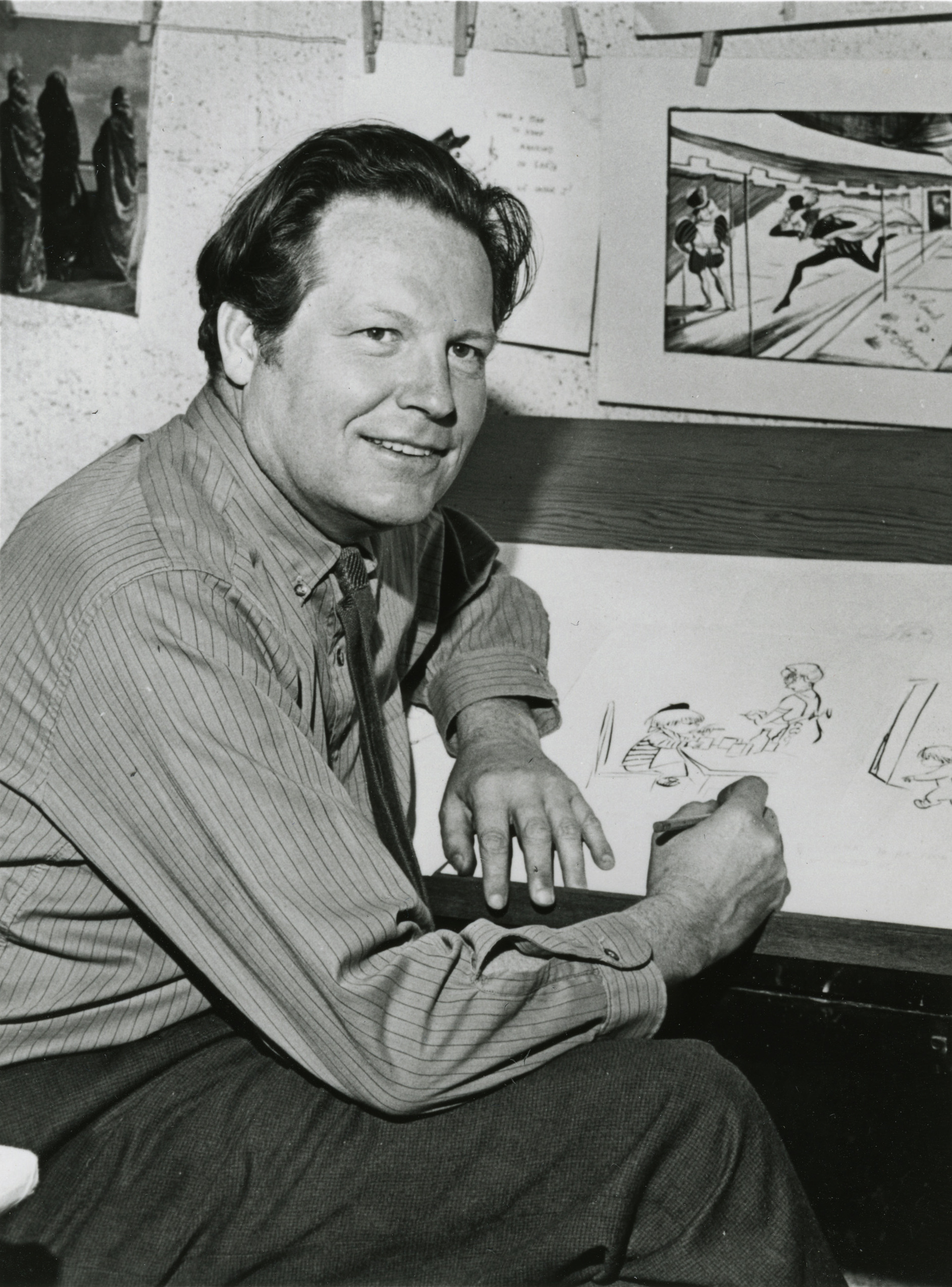
- Freeman at work c. 1954
- Born: August 11, 1908 San Diego, California
- Died: February 1, 1978 (aged 69) New York City
- Areas: Cartoonist, Penciller
- Notable works: Corduroy

Don Freeman (August 11, 1908 – February 1, 1978) was an American painter, printmaker, cartoonist, and an illustrator and writer of children's books. He was active from the 1930s to the 1970s and often used Times Square as the backdrop of his memorable works.

== Early life ==
Freeman was born in San Diego, California. He attended high school in St. Louis, and moved to New York City in late 1928. He studied at the San Diego School of Fine Arts and, after graduation, he earned passage to New York by playing the cornet with a ship's orchestra. He arrived at the city days before the stock market crash of 1929 and earned money as a dance band musician. He enrolled at the Art Students League of New York where he studied graphic design and lithography under John Sloan, Harry Wickey, and Kathryn E. Cherry.

== Career ==
Frequent subjects of Freeman's included Broadway theater, politics, and the circus. Freeman was known for carrying a sketchbook with him wherever he went. His images depicted New York City, and the faces of the people he observed on the streets, in the theaters, and in the subways. They often included images of showgirls, Bowery Boys, drunks, apple sellers, window washers and numerous citizens of the city that were down on their luck. Freeman was also a jazz musician and the brother of hotel entrepreneur Warren Freeman.

As Freeman's career progressed, he lightened his palette and depicted more upbeat subjects. In 1951, he began illustrating children's books. His wife, Lydia, who was also an accomplished artist, authored some of the books Freeman illustrated. The Freemans eventually moved to Santa Barbara, California, where they spent the remainder of their lives.

Don Freeman was first introduced to children's literature when William Saroyan asked him to illustrate several books. These include Human Comedy, which is considered one of his best-known works. However, his greatest influence came from the artist Honoré Daumier. Freeman studied many of Daumier's works, particularly his caricatures. He also owned a large collection of books on the artist.

Throughout Don Freeman's career, he was the writer and illustrator of more than 20 children's books. He is best known for his publication of Corduroy. Although he came up with many of his ideas on his own, his wife Lydia Freeman contributed greatly to his success; she co-wrote two books with him, Chuggy and the Blue Caboose and Pet of the Met. She was very influential on her husband's work, as he relied on her for inspiration for his pieces. He would read his work aloud to her as well as any children around in order to gain feedback on a particular piece. Lydia too became a well-known artist in her later life. In his autobiography Come One, Come All!, Don humorously admits that of the two, she was the better (watercolor) artist.

"Simplicity is the essence of children's-book stories, not simple-mindedness", Don Freeman once stated when speaking to an audience that was interested in writing, illustrating, and publishing children's books.

When Freeman lived in New York City during the 1930s, 1940s, and early 1950s, he was an illustrator of city life in the tradition of Social Realism. His subjects included actors, actresses, and manual laborers. His cartoons and other illustrations appeared regularly in the New York Herald Tribune, The New York Times, The Christian Science Monitor, and Theater Magazine.

From 1936 to 1968, Freeman self-published Don Freeman's Newsstand. It was published as a quarterly magazine for its first decade and then irregularly. The tagline read "Signs of the Times in Lithographs." The periodical documented the daily life in New York City during and after the Great Depression and during the Second World War and featured articles by many well known writers and personalities of the time. In later volumes, Freeman illustrated life in post-war Los Angeles. The journal contained original lithographs.

In 1976, Freeman was recognized by the City of New York for his body of work portraying the city. The New York Daily News reported on the Citation from Mayor Abraham D. Beame, which was presented to Freeman at the opening of a one-man retrospective exhibition. In a measure of Freeman's national fame, The Christian Science Monitor covered the 1976 exhibition, as well as a 1978 retrospective, both of which showcased Freeman's drawings, oils, prints, and his limited-edition self-published periodical, Don Freeman's Newsstand.

In 2018, Freeman's work was featured in "A City for Corduroy", an exhibit at the Museum of the City of New York.

== Selected works ==
- It Shouldn't Happen (Harcourt, Brace, 1945), 212 pp., LCCN 45-7182;
- Come One, Come All! (Rinehart, 1949) – "drawn from memory by Don Freeman", LCCN 49-11554
- Chuggy and the Blue Caboose, written by Don and Lydia Freeman (Viking, 1951)
- Pet of the Met, Don and Lydia Freeman (1953)
- Beady Bear (1954)
- Mop Top (1955)
- Fly High, Fly Low (1957), 1958 Caldecott Honor recipient
- The Night the Lights Went Out (1958)
- Norman the Doorman (1959)
- Space Witch (1959)
- Cyrano the Crow (1960)
- Come Again, Pelican (1961)
- Ski Pup (1963)
- Dandelion (1964)
- The Turtle and the Dove (1964)
- A Rainbow of My Own (1966)
- Angelenos, Then and Now (LA City School District, 1966), LCCN 78-301016
- The Guard Mouse (1967)
- Add-a-line Alphabet (1968)
- Corduroy (1968)
- Quiet! There's a Canary in the Library (1969)
- Tilly Witch (1969)
- Forever Laughter (1970)
- Hattie the Backstage Bat (1970)
- Penguins, of All People (1971)
- Inspector Peckit (1972)
- Flash the Dash (1973)
- Paper Party (1974)
- The Seal and the Slick (1974)
- Will's Quill (1975)
- Bearymore (1976)
- Chalk Box Story (1976)
- A Pocket for Corduroy (1978)
- Gregory's Shadow (Viking, 2000)
- Manuelo the Playing Mantis (2004)
- Earl the Squirrel (2005)

The two Corduroy books by Freeman (1968 and 1978) were also issued in one volume as All About Corduroy (1998). Other writers and illustrators have extended the series "based on the character created by Don Freeman".

=== As illustrator only ===
- Diedrich Knickerbocker's History of New-York, written by Washington Irving (The Heritage Press, 1940), LCCN 40-31939; original, 1809
- My Name Is Aram, by William Saroyan (Harcourt, Brace, 1940), collection
- The Human Comedy, by William Saroyan (Harcourt, 1943)
- The White Deer, by James Thurber (1945) – "illustrated by the author and Don Freeman" LCCN 45-35191
- The Saroyan Special: selected short stories, by William Saroyan (Harcourt, 1948)
- Bill Bergson Lives Dangerously, by Astrid Lindgren (Viking, 1954); original, 1951, Swedish
- Mike's House, Julia L. Sauer (1954)
- Ghost Town Treasure, Clyde Robert Bulla (1957)
- This For That, Ann Nolan Clark (Golden Gate Junior Books, 1966), OCLC 276516
- Joey's Cat, Robert J. Burch (1969)
- Edward and the Night Horses, Jacklyn Meek Matthews (Golden Gate Junior Books, 1971), LCCN 78-141156
- Monster Night at Grandma's House, Richard Peck (1977)
- Dinosaur, My Darling, Edith Thacher Hurd (Harper & Row, 1978)
- The Day Is Waiting, Linda Z. Knab (Viking, 1980)

=== Wordless Novels ===
- Skitzy: the Story of Floyd W. Skitzafroid, (Self-Published, 1955)
- Great Shakes, (Self-Published, 1955; Republished by Taotime Verlag, 2021, ISBN 978-3-906945-28-6)
