= Michael Paraskevas =

American illustrator and cartoonist (born 1961)

- Born: January 28, 1961 (age 65); New Jersey, U.S.
- Education: School of Visual Arts
- Occupations: Illustrator, cartoonist, animator
- Years active: c. 1985–present
- Notable work: Maggie and the Ferocious Beast; Marvin the Tap-Dancing Horse; The Kids from Room 402; The Tangerine Bear
- Spouse: Maria Bruno
- Mother: Betty Paraskevas
- Website: www.michaelparaskevas.com

Michael Paraskevas (born January 28, 1961) is an American illustrator, cartoonist, and animation producer best known for co-creating along with his mother Betty in the Canadian animated children's television series Maggie and the Ferocious Beast. The show was based on the 1996 book The Ferocious Beast with the Polka-Dot Hide and its sequels, all of which were also created by the Paraskevases. Together, they authored 20 children's books. and created three animated series: Maggie and the Ferocious Beast, Marvin the Tap-Dancing Horse, and The Kids from Room 402. They also produced and created The Tangerine Bear as a direct-to-video Christmas special.

Michael Paraskevas's illustration work has appeared in magazines all over the world, including Time, Sports Illustrated, Newsweek, Town & Country, Esquire, The Washington Post, and The New York Times.

== Biography ==
Paraskevas graduated from the School of Visual Arts (SVA) in 1984. Studying illustration and journalism, he received his MFA from SVA in 1986.

The Paraskevas strip Junior Kroll ran weekly for ten years in Dan's Papers in Bridgehampton and New York. Junior Kroll also ran as a monthly feature for five years in United Airlines' Hemispheres magazine. Paraskevas's Green Monkeys is currently running in Dan's Papers as a weekly comic strip and is soon to be syndicated.

Until her death in 2010, Betty and Michael owned and operate The Paraskevas Gallery in Westhampton Beach.

== Bibliography ==
With Betty Paraskevas, unless otherwise noted

- On the Edge of the Sea (Dial Books, 1992)
- Junior Kroll (HMH Books for Young Readers, 1993)
- Shamlanders (Harcourt Children's Books, 1993)
- The Strawberry Dog (Dial Books, 1993)
- Junior Kroll and Company (Harcourt Brace & Company, 1994)
- A Very Kroll Christmas (Harcourt Children's Books, 1994)
- Gracie Graves and the Kids from Room 402 (Harcourt Children's Books, 1995)
- Cecil Bunions and the Midnight Train (Harcourt Children's Books, 1996)
- The Ferocious Beast with the Polka-Dot Hide (Harcourt Children's Books, 1996)
- The Tangerine Bear (HarperCollins Children's Books, 1997)
- Hoppy and Joe (Simon & Schuster Children's Publishing, 1999)
- Maggie and the Ferocious Beast: The Big Scare (Simon & Schuster Children's Publishing, 1999)
- The Big Carrot: A Maggie and the Ferocious Beast Book (Simon & Schuster Children's Publishing, 2000)
- On the Day the Tall Ships Sailed (Simon & Schuster Children's Publishing, 2000)
- (solo) L.A. Times (Paraskevas Gallery, 2001)
- Nibbles O'Hare (Simon & Schuster Children's Publishing, 2001)
- Marvin the Tap-Dancing Horse (Simon & Schuster Children's Publishing, 2001)
- The Green Monkeys (Paraskevas Gallery, 2002)
- The Green Monkeys in the Hamptons (Paraskevas Gallery, 2012)
- (solo) The Green Monkeys' Daily Comics: The Daily Adventures of Spider and Flytrap (Kindle Edition, 2014)
- (solo) Mr. Moon (Crown Books for Young Readers, 2016)
- (solo) The Green Monkeys Making America Green Again (Kindle Edition, 2017)

== Animation ==
=== Television series ===
- Maggie and the Ferocious Beast (Nelvana and Nickelodeon) — co-creator, writer, producer
- Marvin the Tap-Dancing Horse (Nelvana and PBS) — co-creator, producer
- The Kids from Room 402 (CineGroupé and Fox Family Channel) — co-creator, producer

=== Television specials ===
- The Tangerine Bear (Hyperion and ABC) - writer, creator, producers
