= Fionna and Cake =

Fionna and Cake may refer to:

- Fionna Campbell and Cake the Cat, television series characters, see also list of Adventure Time characters
- Adventure Time: Fionna and Cake, an animated series and spin-off of Adventure Time
- "Fionna and Cake" (episode), television series episode of Adventure Time
- "Fionna and Cake and Fionna", television series episode of Adventure Time season 9
- Fionna and Cake, comic book series of the Adventure Time franchise
