= Bad Little Boy =

- Adventure Time episode
- Episode no.: Season 5 Episode 11
- Directed by: Larry Leichliter (Note: Director); Adam Muto (Note: Creative director); Nick Jennings (Note: Art director)
- Written by: Cole Sanchez; Rebecca Sugar
- Story by: Patrick McHale; Adam Muto; Kent Osborne; Rebecca Sugar; Pendleton Ward
- Production code: 1014-110
- Original air date: February 18, 2013
- Running time: 11 minutes

Guest appearances
- Madeleine Martin as Fionna; Roz Ryan as Cake; Donald Glover as Marshall Lee the Vampire King; Neil Patrick Harris as Prince Gumball

Episode chronology
← Previous "Little Dude"	Next → "Vault of Bones"
- Adventure Time season 5

"Bad Little Boy" is the eleventh episode of the fifth season of the American animated television series Adventure Time. The episode was written and storyboarded by Cole Sanchez and Rebecca Sugar, from a story by Sugar, Patrick McHale, Adam Muto, Kent Osborne, and series creator Pendleton Ward. The show follows the adventures of Finn (Jeremy Shada), a human boy, and his best friend and adoptive brother Jake (John DiMaggio), a dog with magical powers to change shape and grow and shrink at will. In this episode, Marceline (Olivia Olson) tells the Ice King (Tom Kenny) a fan fiction involving her genderswapped form Marshall Lee (Donald Glover).

"Bad Little Boy" originally aired on Cartoon Network on February 18, 2013. It serves as a sequel to the third season episode "Fionna and Cake", and sees the return of characters Fionna (Madeleine Martin) and Cake (Roz Ryan), genderswapped forms of Finn and Jake. Glover and Neil Patrick Harris guest star as other genderswapped characters. The episode was a ratings success, being viewed by 3.1 million viewers. In addition, it garnered mostly positive critical reviews.

== Plot ==
Fionna and Cake go after Doctor Prince for stealing the Enchiridion when he is caught by the Ice King (Tom Kenny) and forced to return it and leave. When the Ice King introduces himself to Fionna and Cake, Slime Princess interrupts the scene, revealing it as part of a story told by the Ice King, and that she and several others are being forced to listen to it. As the Ice King deflects their criticisms, Marceline the Vampire Queen (Olivia Olson) comes out of invisibility and shows herself to the Ice King while unlocking the princesses from captivity. She tells him that she had been listening to his story for a couple of hours and claims that she could tell a better story involving the characters of Fionna and Cake. She begins her tale with Fionna and Cake at their Tree Fort, playing a game that involves hurling an axe at an apple resting on the head of BMO (Niki Yang).

Prince Gumball interrupts their game and invites Fionna on another "mission". Suddenly, a blurry figure rushes past them, and they hear knocking on the roof of the Dome. When Fionna, Cake, and Gumball approach the roof, they find Marshall Lee the Vampire King, who invites Fionna and Cake to a party held by Lumpy Space Prince. At the party, Marshall Lee sings a song to Fionna, to which Fionna sings along. When Fionna is pulled away to talk to Marshall Lee, Cake takes over the song. In their discussion, Marshall Lee asks Fionna why she wants to spend so much time with him. This leads to playful fighting between them, followed by actual pushing and shoving, until Cake breaks up the two. After Marshall Lee verbalizes his inherently evil nature, he grabs hold of Cake and takes her to the nearby graveyard guarded by an army of beatboxing skeletons.

After Fionna defeats the skeletons, she approaches Marshall Lee, who turns into a batlike monster. When he impales himself on a spear sticking out of the top of the tomb he is standing on, he returns to his vampire form wounded. As she mourns over him, he asks Fionna to admit that she is in love with him. Angered, she demands that he stop playing with her emotions and be honest for how long he has to live. Jolted, Marshall Lee reveals that the wound is fake and tells her that she is the "realest person" he has ever met. Fionna, ecstatic, punches him in the face playfully before going in to attack him more. Marceline ends her story. While the princesses are satisfied, the Ice King voices that he prefers his version instead. When the rest disagree, he throws them out. Later, he goes to his basement containing gigantic ice sculptures of Fionna and Cake, telling that, one day, he will reach them.

== Cast ==
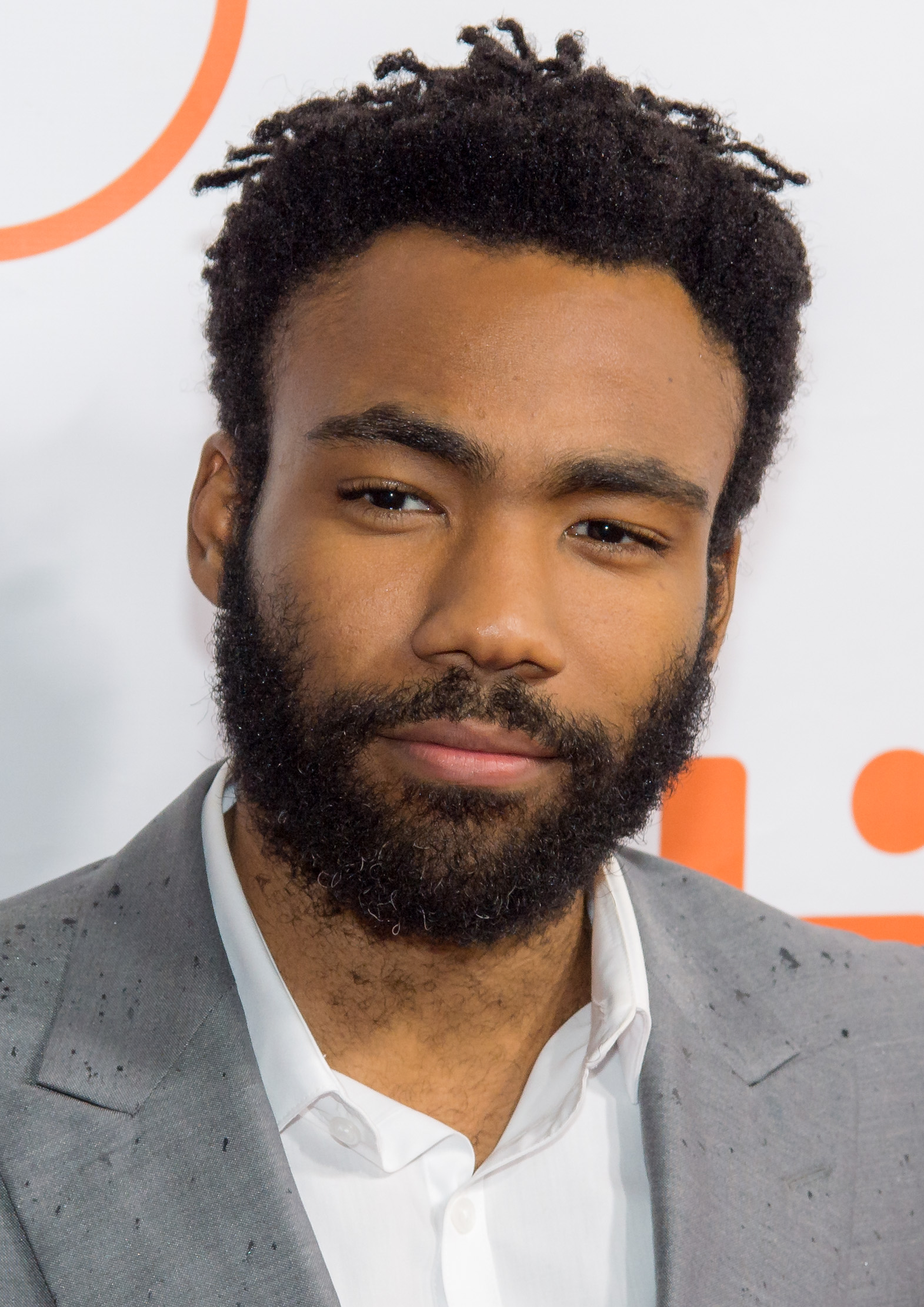
The episode guest starred Donald Glover as Marshall Lee the Vampire King

Taking place in a fan-fictional, genderswapped universe, "Bad Little Boy" likewise features genderswapped versions of the inhabitants of Ooo. A list of the major characters featured in the episode follows:

- Fionna (Madeleine Martin), a genderswapped Finn, is a brave and adventurous girl, who throughout the episode runs into conflict with Marshall Lee.
- Cake (Roz Ryan), a genderswapped Jake, is sarcastic and boisterous but also Fionna's loyal friend. Much like Jake, she possesses the power to stretch her body into a myriad of convoluted shapes.
- Marshall Lee the Vampire King (Donald "Childish Gambino" Glover), a genderswapped Marceline, is a half-demon vampire king, who, through the episode, teases Fionna by trying to convince her that she has a crush on him.
- Lumpy Space Prince (Pendleton Ward (Note: He would later be voiced by Peter Serafinowicz in the sixth season episode "The Prince Who Wanted Everything".)), a genderswapped Lumpy Space Princess, who has the personality exact same as his Ooo counterpart.
- Prince Gumball (Neil Patrick Harris), a genderswapped Princess Bubblegum, who appears to harbor some sort of grudge against Marshall. His appearance in the episode is limited.

== Production ==
"Bad Little Boy" was written and storyboarded by Cole Sanchez and Rebecca Sugar, from a story by Sugar, Patrick McHale, Adam Muto, Kent Osborne, and series creator Pendleton Ward. Martin and Ryan respectively return as Fionna and Cake—genderswapped versions of Finn and Jake introduced in the eponymous ninth episode of the third season. The characters were at first designed by Natasha Allegri out of fun, but Ward suggested they have their own episode. It was a success, but during the nine-month production schedule he only considered it an experiment. After the success, the writers had to pause and reflect whether a sequel should come from "a personal fire, something to give it real worth", or from audience demand; Ward considered the former reason mostly followed. He praised Sanchez and Sugar for their work as "turbo-talented writers and drawers".

The episode introduces Marshall Lee, voiced by Donald Glover (of Community fame). (Note: He was previously featured in Regular Show, another Cartoon Network show, along with several other rappers.) His character delivers a performance in both melody and spoken word. Regarding his role, Ward said, "Donald is the bomb. He's got awesome funny chops and singing chops and we spotlight all his chops in the episode. I was super stoked when he came in, and he's told me he's super stoked to have worked on it, which makes me extra stoked". Harris (of How I Met Your Mother fame), guest stars as Prince Gumball, also introduced in "Fionna and Cake".

== Broadcast and reception ==
"Bad Little Boy" first aired on February 18, 2013, on Cartoon Network. The episode was watched by 3.1 million viewers, receiving a Nielsen rating of 0.7 for adults in the 18- to 49-year-old demographic. According to TV by the Numbers, it was the 26th most-watched cable television episode of its air date. The broadcast followed the release of an iOS game titled Fionna Fights featuring Fionna and Cake, as well as a Fionna and Cake DVD including 16 episodes from various seasons. (Note: A screener of "Bad Little Boy" was also included in the DVD for critics.)

Critical reception was generally positive. In Entertainment Weekly, Darren Franich graded it an A−, designating it as a "brilliant sci-fi", "fantasy", and "musical mash-up". He highlighted the "passion, betrayal, a spoken-word interlude, and a beatboxing skeleton" as contrasting the 11-minute running time. Oliver Sava of The A.V. Club gave it the same grade, writing that because of the short running time, "Fionna and Cake's episodes are filled with what makes this show great". He said that it reflects a shift from "the sunny whimsy" of the early seasons to "the darker, melancholic elements" as it "further explores the history of Ooo". Geekadelphia writer Dan Tabor gave a more mixed review, calling the exchange between the world of Fionna and Ooo "a bit too much" and made it "seem a bit unfocused". He lauded the songs, which he felt were similar to the original Fionna and Cake episode, and ultimately opined that it was "still enjoyable". AXS contributor Justin Cecil listed Glover's song in the episode as his tenth best work. Krutika Mallikarjuna picked out twelve of the most "what the fuck" moments of the episode for a list article in BuzzFeed.
