= Adventure Time: Side Quests =

American animated television series

- Release poster
- Genre: Science fantasy; Adventure; Surreal comedy
- Based on: Adventure Time by Pendleton Ward
- Developed by: Nate Cash
- Showrunner: Nate Cash
- Voices of: John DiMaggio; Sasha Knight; Hynden Walch; Tom Kenny; Olivia Olson; Niki Yang
- Music by: Matthew Janszen
- Opening theme: "Adventure Time" performed by The Moldy Peaches
- Ending theme: "Island Song (Come Along With Me)" performed by The Moldy Peaches
- Country of origin: United States
- Original language: English
- No. of seasons: 2
- No. of episodes: 40

Production
- Executive producers: Nate Cash; Fred Seibert; Sam Register
- Running time: 11 minutes
- Production companies: Cartoon Network Studios; FredFilms

Original release
- Network: Hulu; Disney+
- Release: June 29, 2026 – present

Related
- Adventure Time franchise

Adventure Time: Side Quests is an American animated television series developed by Nate Cash and produced by Cartoon Network Studios. The series is set during the early seasons of the animated series Adventure Time.

The first season of Adventure Time: Side Quests debuted in the United States on Disney+ and Hulu on June 29, 2026. A second season was released on October 2, 2026.

== Premise ==
Set during the early chronological timeline of the Adventure Time universe, the series focuses on the childhood of Finn the Human and chronicles the early development of his brotherly bond with his magical dog, Jake the Dog. Shifting away from the heavy, multi-season serialization found in later franchise projects like Adventure Time: Fionna and Cake, Side Quests is constructed around lighter, self-contained, and standalone episodic stories akin to the early seasons of the original show. The narrative follows the duo completing odd jobs, interacting with cloud people, exploring the Land of Ooo, and engaging in playful confrontations with classic villains like the Ice King.

== Cast ==
- John DiMaggio as Jake the Dog
- Sasha Knight as Finn the Human
- Hynden Walch as Princess Bubblegum
- Tom Kenny as Ice King
- Olivia Olson as Marceline
- Niki Yang as BMO

== Production ==
=== Development ===
The project was originally greenlit and publicly announced by Warner Bros. Animation at the 2024 Annecy International Animation Film Festival as part of an expansion of the Adventure Time intellectual property under Cartoon Network Studios. Longtime original Adventure Time director and storyboard artist Nate Cash was attached to develop the concept as showrunner and executive producer. At the 2025 iteration of the festival, a work-in-progress draft of the series' introductory title sequence was screened for attendees.

In May 2026, Cartoon Network officially unveiled the series' production staff and core voice cast. Victor Courtright and Niki Yang were confirmed as the primary animation directors, with Nick Cross serving as art director and Darrick Bachman managing the script workflow as story editor. In July 2026, a second season was announced, also consisting of 20 episodes.

=== Casting ===
The series features the return of the vast majority of the original program's principal voice actors reprising their legacy roles, including John DiMaggio, Tom Kenny, Hynden Walch Olivia Olson, and Niki Yang. Because the series focuses explicitly on Finn the Human's early childhood, actor Sasha Knight was cast to voice the young Finn the Human, succeeding Jeremy Shada who voiced the adolescent and adult versions of the character across previous media entries.

=== Music ===
The musical score for Side Quests is composed by Matthew Janszen, who previously collaborated with showrunner Nate Cash on the Warner Bros. animated series Tiny Toons Looniversity. The series' new opening theme song consists of a reimagined rendition of the theme song from the original series, performed by the American anti-folk band The Moldy Peaches.

== Episodes ==
Season	Episodes	Originally released
1	20	June 29, 2026
2	20	October 2, 2026

=== Season 1 (2026) ===
No. overall	No. in season	Title	Directed by	Written and storyboarded by	Story by	Original release date
1	1	"Bros & Arrows"	Victor Courtright	K Pakiz and Matthew Yang	Nate Cash and Bryan Caselli	June 29, 2026
2	2	"Dandy Bug"	Victor Courtright	K Pakiz and Matthew Yang	Nate Cash, Jesse Moynihan, and Spencer Rothbell	June 29, 2026
3	3	"Cursed Words"	Victor Courtright	Victor Courtright	Emiko Sawanobori, Nate Cash, and Meghan Lands	June 29, 2026
4	4	"Rescue Princess"	Niki Yang	Pendleton Ward and Niki Yang	Emiko Sawanobori, Nate Cash, and Darrick Bachman	June 29, 2026
5	5	"Smell Detective"	Rose Feduk	Katie Aldworth and Rose Feduk	Jessica Combs and Niki Yang	June 29, 2026
6	6	"Golden Gals"	Niki Yang	Megan Fisher, Nicolette Wood, and Niki Yang	Niki Yang and Jessica Combs	June 29, 2026
7	7	"Dummy Princess"	Rose Feduk	Charlie Bryant and Rose Feduk	Jesse Moynihan	June 29, 2026
8	8	"Son of the Goblin Queen"	Victor Courtright	K Pakiz and Matthew Yang	Victor Courtright and Bryan Caselli	June 29, 2026
9	9	"All You Can Eat"	Victor Courtright	Megan Fisher and Nicolette Wood	Jesse Moynihan and Jessica Combs	June 29, 2026
10	10	"Let It Roll"	Rose Feduk and Katie Aldworth	K Pakiz and Matthew Yang	Darrick Bachman and Ben Crouse	June 29, 2026
11	11	"Joey Waffles"	Niki Yang	K Pakiz and Matthew Yang	Nate Cash, Emiko Sawanobori, and Darrick Bachman	June 29, 2026
12	12	"Island of Shame"	Victor Courtright	Jesse Moynihan, Katie Aldworth, and Victor Courtright	Bryan Caselli	June 29, 2026
13	13	"The Candy Spirit"	Niki Yang	K Pakiz and Matthew Yang	Darrick Bachman and Jessica Combs	June 29, 2026
14	14	"Game Night"	Katie Aldworth	Megan Fisher and Nicolette Wood	Emiko Sawanobori	June 29, 2026
15	15	"Punchy"	Katie Aldworth and Rose Feduk	Katie Aldworth and Jesse Moynihan	Tom Herpich	June 29, 2026
16	16	"Key Quest"	Rose Feduk	Charlie Bryant and Erin Kim	Niki Yang and Bryan Caselli	June 29, 2026
17	17	"Love Bugs"	Niki Yang	Katie Aldworth and Mark Galez	Jessica Combs	June 29, 2026
18	18	"Re-Run Dungeon"	Niki Yang	Megan Fisher, Nicolette Wood, and Victor Courtright	Darrick Bachman and Ben Crouse	June 29, 2026
19	19	"The Prophecy"	Rose Feduk and Katie Aldworth	Charlie Bryant, Erin Kim, and Victor Courtright	Bryan Caselli	June 29, 2026
20	20	"Car Wars"	Niki Yang	Charlie Bryant and Erin Kim	Darrick Bachman and Dani Michaeli	June 29, 2026

=== Season 2 (2026) ===
No. overall	No. in season	Title	Directed by	Written and storyboarded by	Story by	Original release date
21	1	"Death Fiction"	Katie Aldworth	K Pakiz and Matthew Yang	Nate Cash and Darrick Bachman	October 2, 2026
22	2	"Alpha Dog"	Victor Courtright	Nick Edwards and Jesse Moynihan	Bryan Caselli	October 2, 2026
23	3	"The Chore Wheel"	Niki Yang	Erin Kim and Jesse Moynihan	Darrick Bachman, Nate Cash, Victor Courtright, and Rose Feduk	October 2, 2026
24	4	"Tiny Negs"	Katie Aldworth	K Pakiz and Matthew Yang	Nate Cash and Darrick Bachman	October 2, 2026
25	5	"Freelancers"	Victor Courtright	K Pakiz and Matthew Yang	Bryan Caselli	October 2, 2026
26	6	"Sunshine Kingdom"	Niki Yang	Megan Fisher and Nicolette Wood; Drew Green (additional storyboards)	Tom Herpich	October 2, 2026
27	7	"Toad Wrestlers"	Victor Courtright	Charlie Bryant, Erin Kim, and Victor Courtright	Megan Fisher, Jessica Combs, and Darrick Bachman	October 2, 2026
28	8	"Righteous Dude"	Rose Feduk	Megan Fisher and Nicolette Wood	Victor Courtright and Darrick Bachman	October 2, 2026
29	9	"Head Hunted"	Niki Yang	K Pakiz and Matthew Yang	Bryan Caselli	October 2, 2026
30	10	"Text-Based Journey To Donut Palace"	Niki Yang	Nick Edwards and Jesse Moynihan	Somvilay Xayaphone, Darrick Bachman, and Nate Cash	October 2, 2026
31	11	"Wedgie Tree"	Niki Yang	Nick Edwards and Jesse Moynihan	Dani Michaeli and Darrick Bachman	October 2, 2026
32	12	"The Notorious Pup Gang"	Niki Yang	Charlie Bryant and Erin Kim; Jason Dwyer (additional storyboards)	Jesse Moynihan	October 2, 2026
33	13	"Storm Rider"	Katie Aldworth	Katie Aldworth, Drew Green, Somvilay Xayaphone, and Bert Youn	Nate Cash, Darrick Bachman, and Jessica Combs	October 2, 2026
34	14	"Curse Of The Unread"	Katie Aldworth	Graham Falk; K Pakiz and Matthew Yang (additional storyboards)	Darrick Bachman and Jessica Combs	October 2, 2026
35	15	"The Zipline"	Victor Courtright	Megan Fisher and Nicolette Wood	Darrick Bachman	October 2, 2026
36	16	"Sweet Tooth"	Victor Courtright	Charlie Bryant and Erin Kim	Jesse Moynihan, Rob Renzetti, and Darrick Bachman	October 2, 2026
37	17	"Tiny Adventure Time"	Katie Aldworth	Megan Fisher and Nicolette Wood; Joan Ford (additional writing)	Darrick Bachman and Nate Cash	October 2, 2026
38	18	"Escape From The Baby Kingdom"	Victor Courtright	Charlie Bryant, Victor Courtright, and Erin Kim	Nate Cash and Darrick Bachman	October 2, 2026
39	19	"The Morrow Bird"	Niki Yang	Megan Fisher and Nicolette Wood	Darrick Bachman	October 2, 2026
40	20	"Ice Choir"	Victor Courtright	Megan Fisher and Nicolette Wood	Darrick Bachman, Rob Renzetti, and Jessica Combs	October 2, 2026

== Release ==
Adventure Time: Side Quests released on June 29, 2026, on Disney+ and Hulu in the United States, and was released internationally on Cartoon Network and HBO Max on October 5, 2026. A second season was released on October 2, 2026.
