= Roz Ryan =

American actress

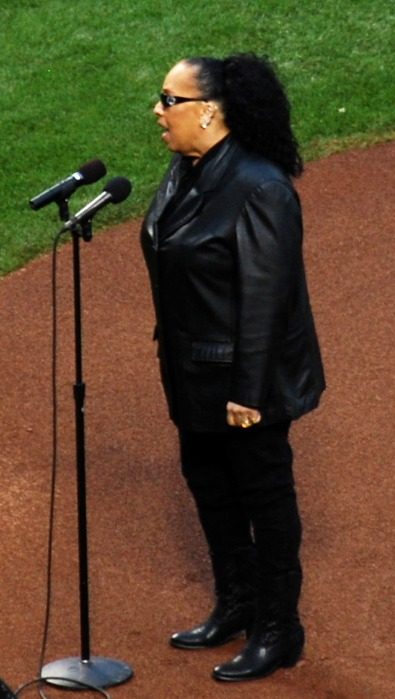
- Ryan singing the national anthem at Citi Field in 2011
- Born: Rosalyn Bowen; Detroit, Michigan, U.S.
- Occupations: Actress; singer; comedian
- Years active: 1978–present
- Website: www.rozryan.com

Roz Ryan (born Rosalyn Bowen) is an American actress, singer and comedian who has worked for productions in film, television, and Broadway theatre for over 40 years. Ryan's first role on Broadway was in Ain't Misbehavin', a Fats Waller-influenced musical revue that debuted in 1978. She is well known for her part in the television show, Amen, for her character Amelia Hetebrink, for being the voice of Thalia, the Muse of Comedy in the 1997 Disney animated film, Hercules, and for guest starring on the Disney Channel sitcom, K.C. Undercover as Grandma Gayle.

== Life and career ==
Ryan was born Rosalyn Bowen in Detroit, Michigan, the daughter of Gertrude and Thomas Bowen, who worked for the Board of Education. She is a 1969 graduate of Mackenzie High School. A year later, she recorded the Stax/Volt 45, "You're My Only Temptation." For 13 years, Ryan worked as a nightclub singer in Detroit before a friend suggested she audition for Ain't Misbehavin, a Broadway musical revue featuring the music of Fats Waller. Her audition was successful, and she was on stage only 10 days later. Ryan continued to star in numerous Broadway musicals including the Tony Award-winning Chicago, for which she holds the record of longest tenure for the character Matron "Mama" Morton. Other plays Ryan has appeared in are A Christmas Carol, Dreamgirls, One Mo' Time, and the 2006 revival of The Pajama Game.

In television and film, Ryan is better known for her roles as Amelia Hetebrink on Amen, Mrs. Dixon on Good News and Flo Anderson on All About the Andersons. She also guest starred on an episode on Barbershop. She was the voice of Thalia, the Muse of Comedy in Disney's animated film Hercules and Hercules: The Animated Series. She is the voice of Bubbie the whale in the 2008 animated television series The Marvelous Misadventures of Flapjack. She had roles in the films I Think I Love My Wife, The Invention of Lying and Waiting for Forever. She voices Kick's teacher Ms. Fitzpatrick in the animated series Kick Buttowski: Suburban Daredevil. She was the voice of Witch Lezah in The Looney Tunes Show. She has also played Jake's female feline counterpart Cake in the Adventure Time episodes "Fionna and Cake", "Bad Little Boy", "The Prince Who Wanted Everything", and "Five Short Tables"—and voiced the character in the spin-off series Adventure Time: Fionna and Cake. She has also starred in TVOne's The Rickey Smiley Show.

She most recently starred on Broadway in Scandalous: The Life and Trials of Aimee Semple McPherson. In late May 2016 Ryan begun her 13th run in Chicago as Matron "Mama" Morton.

== Broadway stage ==
- Scandalous: The Life and Trials of Aimee Semple McPherson (2012)
- The Pajama Game (2006)
- One Mo' Time (2002)
- Chicago (1996–2019)
- Dreamgirls (1981–1985)
- Ain't Misbehavin' (1978–1981)

== Filmography ==
=== Film ===
Year	Title	Role	Notes
1997	Hercules	Thalia, the Muse of Comedy (voice)	
1997	The Brave Little Toaster to the Rescue	Computer Parts / Additional voices (voice)	Direct-to-video
1998	Went to Coney Island on a Mission from God... Be Back by Five	Nurse	
1999	Hercules: Zero to Hero	Thalia (voice)	Direct-to-video
1999	Nikita’s Blues	Mildred	Short film
2007	I Think I Love My Wife	Landlady	
2007	Divine Intervention	Mother Candice	
2007	Whatever Lola Wants	Postal Worker	
2009	Steppin: The Movie	Roz	
2009	The Invention of Lying	Nurse Barbara	
2010	Waiting for Forever	Dorothy	
2015	Hello, My Name Is Doris	Nurse Patty	

=== Television ===
Year	Title	Role	Notes
1986–91	Amen	Amelia Hetebrink	Main role, 110 episodes
1997	Sparks	Loretta	Episode: "Rehearsal of Fortune"
1997–98	Good News	Hattie Dixon	Main role, 22 episodes
1998	Beyond Belief: Fact or Fiction	Sister Louise Pittman	Episode: "Kirby/Dust/Malibu Cop/A Joyful Noise"
1998	The Journey of Allen Strange	Merle	Episode: "The Truth About Lies"
1998–99	Hercules	Thalia (voice)	Recurring role, 24 episodes
2000	Buzz Lightyear of Star Command	Madam President (voice)	Recurring role, 7 episodes
2001	Danny	Chickie	Main role, 9 episodes
2002–07	Kim Possible	Wade's mom / Park Ranger (voice)	Episodes: "Crush", "Monkey Fist Strikes", "Mother's Day" and "The Cupid Effect"
2003–04	All About the Andersons	Florence "Flo" Anderson	Main role, 16 episodes
2004	Half & Half	Josephine Baylor	Episode: "The Big Practice What You Preach Episode"
2004	Lilo & Stitch: The Series	Dr. Gladys (voice)	Episode: "Spike: Experiment 319"
2005	JAG	Loretta McKee	Episode: "Unknown Soldier"
2005	Barbershop	Mae	Episodes: "Madonna Is a Ho", "Family Business" and "Debates and Dead People"
2008	The Bobby Lee Project	Aunt Viola	Television film
2008–10	The Marvelous Misadventures of Flapjack	Bubbie (voice)	Main role, 44 episodes
2010–12	Kick Buttowski: Suburban Daredevil	Ms. Fitzpatrick (voice)	Recurring role, 6 episodes
2011–13	The Looney Tunes Show	Witch Lezah (voice)	Recurring role, 12 episodes
2011–17	Adventure Time	Cake (voice)	Recurring role, 5 episodes
2012	Let's Stay Together	Mrs. Galloway	Episode: "All Juice, No Seeds"
2012	Scooby-Doo! Mystery Incorporated	Gorgeous G (voice)	Episode: "The Night the Clown Cried II: Tears of Doom!"
2012	General Hospital	Esther Love	Episode: "1.12632"
2012–14	The Rickey Smiley Show	Aunt Sylvia	Main role, 22 episodes
2014	Teen Titans Go!	Cyborg's Grandma Voice (voice)	Episode: "Grandma Voice"
2014	Bee and PuppyCat	Temp Bot No. 3 (voice)	Episode: "Cats"
2015	Mickey Mouse	Cow (voice)	Episode: "Movie Time"
2015–17	K.C. Undercover	Grandma Gayle King	Episodes: "Off the Grid", "KC and Brett: The Final Chapter, Part 1", "The Legend of Bad, Bad Cleo Brown" and "Out of the Water and Into the Fire"
2018	Mighty Magiswords	Steel Magnolia (voice)	Episode: "Suitable Armor"
2019	Nowhere USA	Martha	Television film
2019	Raven's Home	Miss Bertha	Episodes: "Friend-Ship" and "Lost at Chel-Sea"
2019–21	Summer Camp Island	Elder Yeti / The Death Cap / Additional voices (voice)	Recurring role, 7 episodes
2021; 2022	That Girl Lay Lay	Velma	Episodes: "Ha-Lay-Lay-Lujah" and "Lay Lay’s Beauty Shop Day Day"
2022	Mickey Mouse Funhouse	Thalia (voice)	Episode: "Daisy and the Muses/Keep on the Ball" and "Farfus' Family!/The Adventure Parade!"
2023–present	Adventure Time: Fionna and Cake	Cake (voice)	Main role

=== Video games ===
Year	Title	Role	Notes
1997	Disney’s Animated Storybook: Hercules	Thalia	
1997	Disney's Hercules	Thalia	
1999	Tonic Trouble	The Barmain	
2022	MultiVersus	Cake (Jake variant)	
2026	High on Life 2	Tiffany	
