= Adventure Time (franchise) =

American animated fantasy franchise

- Created by: Pendleton Ward
- Original work: "Adventure Time" (2007) from Nicktoons Network's Random! Cartoons
- Owners: The Cartoon Network, Inc. (Skydance)
- Years: 2007–present

Print publications
- Book: See below
- Comics: See below
- Graphic novel: See below

Films and television
- Animated series: Adventure Time (2010–2018); Distant Lands (2020–2021); Fionna and Cake (2023–present); Side Quests (2026–present); Bubblegum and Marceline (forthcoming)
- Television short: "Adventure Time" (2007) from Nicktoons Network's Random! Cartoons

Games
- Traditional: See below
- Video game: See below

Adventure Time is an American animated fantasy franchise created by Pendleton Ward, set in the post-apocalyptic Land of Ooo. The franchise originated from a 2007 short produced for Fred Seibert's animation incubator series Random! Cartoons at Nickelodeon Animation and aired on Nicktoons Network. After the short became a viral hit on the Internet, Nickelodeon's executives passed on its option before Cartoon Network commissioned a full-length series from Seibert and Ward, which premiered on Cartoon Network on April 5, 2010, and ended on September 3, 2018. The series drew inspiration from a variety of sources, including the fantasy role-playing game Dungeons & Dragons and video games. Alongside the original television series, the characters of the show have been featured in a variety of media, including two spin-offs, comic series, card games and video games.

The original series centers on the coming of age of Finn the Human and his best friend and adoptive brother Jake the Dog—a dog with the magical power to change size and shape at will—as they embark on a series of adventures, interacting with Princess Bubblegum, the Ice King, Marceline the Vampire Queen, and several others. Different versions of the characters inhabit other dimensions throughout the show's multiverse and their personal characteristics can vary from one reality to another. The Adventure Time franchise has received widespread critical acclaim, winning several awards, including eight Primetime Emmy Awards, a Peabody Award, three Annie Awards, two British Academy Children's Awards, a Motion Picture Sound Editors Award, and a Kerrang! Award. The series has also been nominated for three Critics' Choice Television Awards, two Annecy Festival Awards, a TCA Award, and a Sundance Film Festival Award, among others. Of the many comic book series in the franchise, one received an Eisner Award and two Harvey Awards.

== Main characters ==
Adventure Time follows the adventures of a boy named Finn the Human (Note: Also known by his birth name, Finn Mertens.) (voiced by Jeremy Shada), and his best friend and adoptive brother Jake the Dog (John DiMaggio), who has magical powers to change shape and size at will. Pendleton Ward, the series' creator, describes Finn as a "fiery little kid with strong morals". Jake, on the other hand, is based on Tripper Harrison, Bill Murray's character in Meatballs. This means while Jake is somewhat care-free, he will "sit [Finn] down and give him some decent advice if he really needs it". Finn and Jake live in the post-apocalyptic Land of Ooo, which was ravaged by a cataclysmic event known as the "Mushroom War", a nuclear war that destroyed civilization a thousand years before the series' events. Throughout the series, Finn and Jake interact with major characters, including the other main characters, Princess Bubblegum (Hynden Walch), the sovereign of the Candy Kingdom and a sentient piece of gum; the Ice King (Tom Kenny), a menacing but largely misunderstood ice wizard and Marceline the Vampire Queen (Olivia Olson), a thousand-year-old vampire and rock music enthusiast; and major recurring characters, Lumpy Space Princess (Pendleton Ward), a melodramatic and immature princess made out of "lumps"; BMO (Niki Yang), a sentient video game console-shaped robot that lives with Finn and Jake; and Flame Princess (Jessica DiCicco), a flame elemental and ruler of the Fire Kingdom.

== Television series ==
Four television series make up the Adventure Time franchise: Adventure Time, Distant Lands, Fionna and Cake, and Side Quests. All series in total amount to 347 episodes across 15 seasons of television.

Series	Season	Episodes	Originally released			Showrunner(s)	Status
Series	Season	Episodes	First released	Last released	Network	Showrunner(s)	Status
"Adventure Time"	Short film		January 11, 2007		Nicktoons	Pendleton Ward	Concluded
Adventure Time	1	26	April 5, 2010 (Note: See the notes concerning episode releases in the Adventure Time series overview table at List of Adventure Time episodes § Series overview.)	September 27, 2010	Cartoon Network	Pendleton Ward	Concluded
Adventure Time	2	26	October 11, 2010	May 9, 2011	Cartoon Network	Pendleton Ward	Concluded
Adventure Time	3	26	July 11, 2011	February 13, 2012	Cartoon Network	Pendleton Ward	Concluded
Adventure Time	4	26	April 2, 2012	October 22, 2012	Cartoon Network	Pendleton Ward	Concluded
Adventure Time	5	52	November 12, 2012	March 17, 2014	Cartoon Network	Pendleton Ward and Adam Muto	Concluded
Adventure Time	6	43	April 21, 2014	June 5, 2015	Cartoon Network	Adam Muto	Concluded
Adventure Time	7	26	November 2, 2015	March 19, 2016	Cartoon Network	Adam Muto	Concluded
Adventure Time	8	27	March 26, 2016	February 2, 2017	Cartoon Network	Adam Muto	Concluded
Adventure Time	9	14	April 21, 2017	July 21, 2017	Cartoon Network	Adam Muto	Concluded
Adventure Time	10	16	September 17, 2017	September 3, 2018	Cartoon Network	Adam Muto	Concluded
Distant Lands	1	4	June 25, 2020	September 2, 2021	Max / HBO Max	Adam Muto	Concluded
Fionna and Cake	1	10	August 31, 2023	September 28, 2023	Max / HBO Max	Adam Muto	Released
Fionna and Cake	2	10	October 23, 2025	December 25, 2025	Max / HBO Max	Adam Muto	Released
Side Quests	1	20	June 29, 2026		Disney+ & Hulu	Nate Cash	Released
Side Quests	2	20	October 2, 2026		Disney+ & Hulu	Nate Cash	Released
Heyo BMO	1	TBA	TBA	TBA	Cartoon Network	Adam Muto and Ashlyn Anstee	In development
Bubblegum and Marceline	1	10	TBA	TBA	HBO Max	Adam Muto	In development

=== "Adventure Time" short (2007) ===
The series can trace its origin back to a seven-minute, stand-alone animated short film of the same name (this short would later be identified as the show's pilot post facto). Frederator Studios identified Ward and the short in 2006, and Ward created the short almost entirely by himself (along with Adam Muto, the eventual creative director and Ward college classmate worked as his creative companion on the short and future supervising director Larry Leichliter), and concluded its production in early 2006. It was first broadcast on Nicktoons Network on January 11, 2007, and was re-broadcast as part of Frederator Studios' anthology show Random! Cartoons on December 7, 2008. After its initial release, the video became a viral hit on the Internet.

=== Adventure Time (2010–2018) ===
Adventure Time is a fantasy animated television series created by Pendleton Ward and produced by Frederator Studios for Cartoon Network. The series follows the adventures of a boy named Finn (Jeremy Shada) and his best friend and adoptive brother Jake (John DiMaggio)—a dog with the magical power to change size and shape at will. Finn and Jake live in the post-apocalyptic Land of Ooo, where they interact with Princess Bubblegum (Hynden Walch), the Ice King (Tom Kenny), Marceline (Olivia Olson), BMO (Niki Yang), and others. After the pilot became a viral hit on the Internet, Nickelodeon's executives passed on its option before Cartoon Network commissioned a full-length series from Fred Seibert and Ward, which was previewed on March 11, 2010. The same year, the series premiered on Cartoon Network on April 5, and it ended its eight-year run on September 3, 2018.

=== Distant Lands (2020–2021) ===
On October 23, 2019, Cartoon Network announced that four hour-long specials—collectively titled Adventure Time: Distant Lands—would air on HBO Max. The first two specials were released in 2020, while the third was released on May 20, 2021. The fourth and final episode, "Wizard City", was released on September 2, 2021. The series focuses on new and returning characters in previously unexplored areas of the Adventure Time universe.

=== Fionna and Cake (2023–present) ===
On August 17, 2021, it was announced that a third series, Adventure Time: Fionna and Cake, had been ordered by HBO Max. The series follows Finn and Jake's gender-swapped complements, Fionna the Human and Cake the Cat. The series also stars Simon Petrikov, a character who for most of Adventure Time had been identified as the Ice King. Adventure Time: Fionna and Cake sees the trio travel throughout the multiverse, while also being chased by "a powerful new antagonist" who is "determined to track them down and erase them from existence." Fionna and Cake was renewed for a second season on December 5, 2023.

=== Side Quests (2026–present) ===
On June 12, 2024, a soft reboot television series, titled Adventure Time: Side Quests, was announced at the Annecy International Animation Film Festival. The series follows a younger Finn and Jake. On May 18, 2026, it was announced that the series would premiere on Hulu and Disney+ in the United States on June 29, 2026, and internationally on Cartoon Network and HBO Max on October 5, 2026. In September 2026, it was announced that the second season of the series will be set to be released in October 2, 2026.

=== Heyo BMO ===
On June 12, 2024, a preschool series titled Heyo BMO or Adventure Time: Heyo BMO was announced to be in development at the Annecy International Animation Film Festival. The series will follow BMO as they settle into a new neighborhood with new friends.

=== Bubblegum and Marceline ===
On June 24, 2026, Adam Muto announced at the 2026 Annecy International Animation Film Festival that a new spin-off series focusing on Princess Bubblegum and Marceline the Vampire Queen received a straight to series order from HBO Max. The series will run for 10 episodes.

== References in other media ==
=== Cameo in Futurama ===
"Leela and the Genestalk" is the twenty-second episode of the seventh season of the animated television series Futurama, and the 136th episode of the series overall. It aired in the United States on Comedy Central on August 7, 2013. The episode features a cameo of Finn and Jake, with John DiMaggio (who voices Bender in Futurama) reprising his role as Jake for the appearance.

=== Parody in The Simpsons ===
"Monty Burns' Fleeing Circus" is the season premiere of the twenty-eighth season of the animated television series The Simpsons, and the 597th episode of the series overall. It aired in the United States on Fox on September 25, 2016. The couch gag of "Monty Burns' Fleeing Circus" is a parody of Adventure Time, parodying the series' title sequence, complete with Pendleton Ward himself singing a spoof of the Adventure Time theme song. According to Al Jean, the executive producer of The Simpsons, "[The couch gag] was the brain child of Mike Anderson, our supervising director ... It's a really beautiful, elaborate crossover".

== Comic series ==
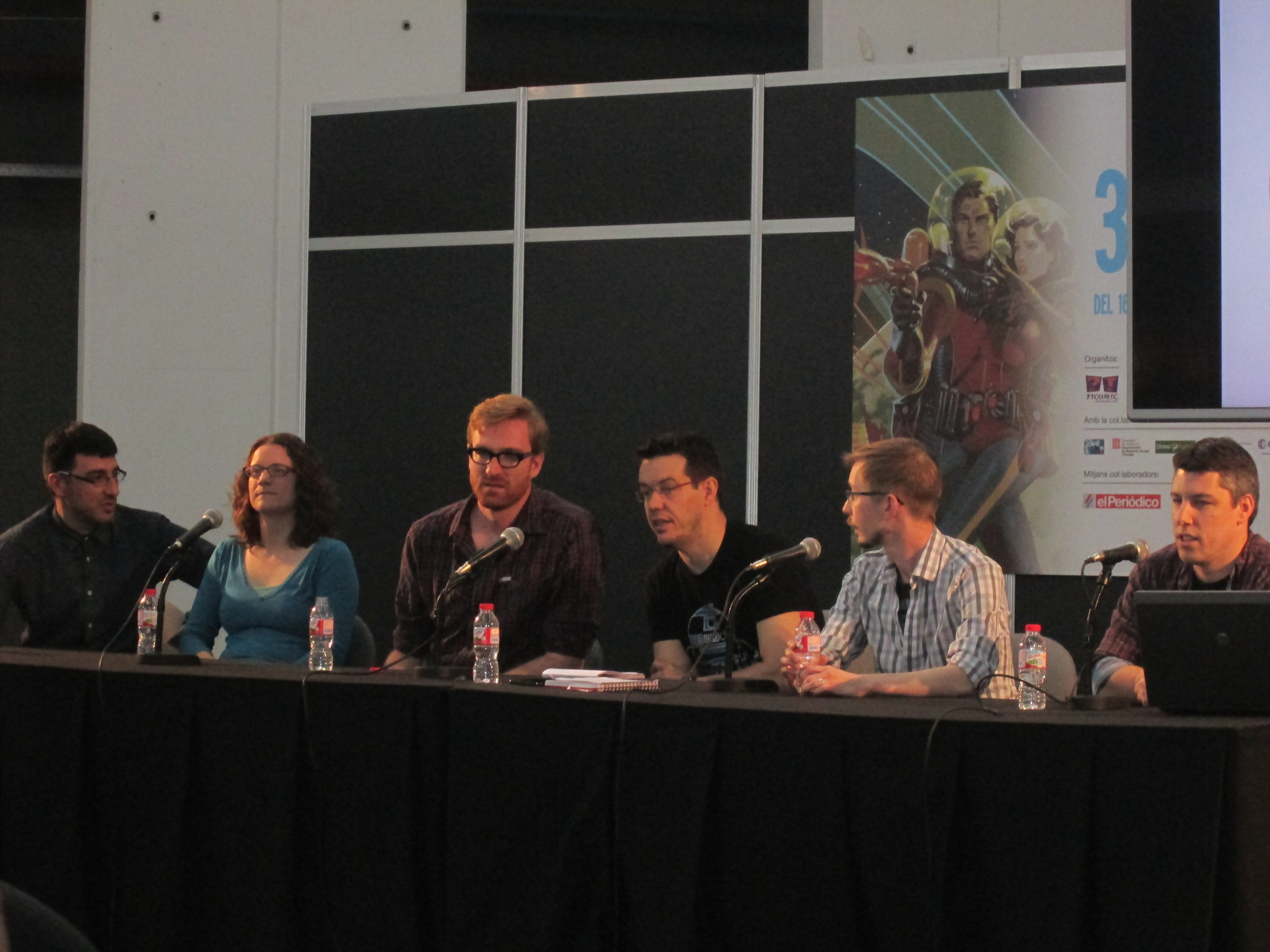
Ryan North (third from the left) along with other Adventure Time comics crew in 2015

On November 19, 2011, KaBoom! Studios announced plans for an Adventure Time comic book series written by independent web comic creator Ryan North, who wrote the series Dinosaur Comics. The series launched on February 8, 2012, with art by Shelli Paroline and Braden Lamb. In October 2014, it was revealed that North had left the comic series after three years. His duties were assumed by Christopher Hastings, the creator of The Adventures of Dr. McNinja. This comic book line ended in April 2018 with its seventy-fifth issue, which North returned to co-write.

=== Comic books ===
==== Trade Paperback collections ====
- Volume 1 (issues #1-4)
- Volume 2 (issues #5-9)
- Volume 3 (issues #10-14)
- Volume 4 (issues #15-19)
- Volume 5 (issues #20-24)
- Volume 6 (issues #25-29)
- Volume 7 (issues #30-34)
- Volume 8 (issues #35-39)
- Volume 9 (issues #40-44)
- Volume 10 (issues #45-49)
- Volume 11 (issues #50-53)
- Volume 12 (issues #54-57)
- Volume 13 (issues #58-61)
- Volume 14 (issues #62-65)
- Volume 15 (issues #66-69)
- Volume 16 (issues #70-73)
- Volume 17 (issues #74-75)
  - Also includes material from the second Free Comic Book Day issue and Season 11 #1

==== Sugary Shorts ====
Trade paperback collections of shorter backup stories from the main series issues and from some specials.

- Volume 1 (issues #1-14)
- Volume 2 (issues #16-18, 2013 Spoooktacular, 2013 Summer Special, 2013 Annual)
- Volume 3 (issues #19-28, 2014 Winter Special, 2014 Annual)
- Volume 4 (issues #29-49)
- Volume 5 (issues #15, 2015 Spooktacular, and material from the first five Graphic Novels)

==== Miniseries ====
- Adventure Time: Marceline and the Scream Queens (6 issues, 2012)
- Adventure Time: Candy Capers (6 issues, 2013)
- Adventure Time: The Flip Side (6 issues, 2014)
- Adventure Time: Banana Guard Academy (6 issues, 2014)
- Adventure Time: Marceline Gone Adrift (6 issues, 2015)
- Adventure Time: Ice King (6 issues, 2016)
- Adventure Time/Regular Show (6 issues, 2017–2018)
- Adventure Time: Season 11 (6 issues, 2018–2019)
- Adventure Time: Marcy & Simon (6 issues, 2019)

==== Fionna and Cake comics ====
Boom! Studios published a number of comics featuring Fionna and Cake, all of which pre-dated the animated show:

- Adventure Time with Fionna & Cake (6 issues, Jan 2013–June 2013) — mostly by Natasha Allegri; collected in a trade paperback in December 2013
- Adventure Time with Fionna and Cake 2018 Free Comic Book Day Special (one-shot, May 2018)
- Adventure Time with Fionna and Cake: Card Wars (6 issues, July 2015–Dec 2015) — by Jen Wang, Britt Wilson, and Rian Sygh
- Adventure Time: Fionna and Cake (one-shot, 2020)

=== Graphic novels ===
- Adventure Time: Playing with Fire (2012)
- Adventure Time: Pixel Princesses (2013)
- Adventure Time: Seeing Red (2014)
- Adventure Time: Bitter Sweets (2014)
- Adventure Time: Graybles Schmaybles (2015)
- Adventure Time: Masked Mayhem (2015)
- Adventure Time: The Four Castles (2016)
- Adventure Time: President Bubblegum (2016)
- Adventure Time: Brain Robbers (2017)
- Adventure Time: The Ooorient Express (2017)
- Adventure Time: Princess & Princess (2018)
- Adventure Time: Thunder Road (2018)
- Adventure Time: Marceline the Pirate Queen (2019)

== Video games ==
The series has spawned several major video game releases; various minor video games have also been released. Several, including Legends of Ooo, Fionna Fights, Beemo – Adventure Time, and Ski Safari: Adventure Time, have been released on the iOS App Store. A game titled Finn & Jake's Quest was released on April 11, 2014, on Steam. Cartoon Network also released a multiplayer online battle arena (MOBA) game titled Adventure Time: Battle Party on Cartoon Network's official site, on June 23, 2014. In April 2015, two downloadable content packs for LittleBigPlanet 3 on PlayStation 3 and PlayStation 4 were released; one contained Adventure Time costumes, while the other contained a level kit with decorations, stickers, music, objects, a background, and a bonus Fionna costume. A virtual reality (VR) game entitled Adventure Time: Magic Man's Head Games was also released to Oculus Rift, HTC Vive, and PlayStation VR. A second VR game, entitled Adventure Time: I See Ooo, was released on September 29, 2016. In that same month, Adventure Time characters were added to the Lego Dimensions game. Finn and Jake became playable characters in the video game Cartoon Network: Battle Crashers which was released for the Nintendo 3DS, PlayStation 4, and Xbox One on November 8, 2016, and the Nintendo Switch on October 31, 2017. Finn, Jake and Banana Guard are playable characters in the platform fighter MultiVersus.

=== Adventure Time: Hey Ice King! Why'd You Steal Our Garbage?!! (2012) ===
The first game based on the series, Adventure Time: Hey Ice King! Why'd You Steal Our Garbage?!!, was announced by Pendleton Ward on his Twitter account in March 2012. The game was developed by WayForward Technologies for Nintendo DS and Nintendo 3DS, and was released by D3 Publisher on November 20, 2012.

=== Adventure Time: Explore the Dungeon Because I Don't Know! (2013) ===
The second game based on the series, Adventure Time: Explore the Dungeon Because I Don't Know!, follows Finn and Jake as they strive "to save the Candy Kingdom by exploring the mysterious Secret Royal Dungeon deep below the Land of Ooo", was released in November 2013.

=== Adventure Time: The Secret of the Nameless Kingdom (2014) ===
On November 18, 2014, Adventure Time: The Secret of the Nameless Kingdom was released for Nintendo 3DS, Xbox 360, PlayStation 3, PlayStation Vita, and Microsoft Windows.

=== Adventure Time: Finn & Jake Investigations (2015) ===
In October 2015, the fourth major Adventure Time video game, titled Finn & Jake Investigations, was released for 3DS, Windows and other consoles. It is the first in the series to feature full 3D graphics.

=== Adventure Time: Pirates of the Enchiridion (2018) ===
Another game, Adventure Time: Pirates of the Enchiridion, was released for the PlayStation 4, Nintendo Switch, Windows, and Xbox One in July 2018. The game was published by Outright Games, developed by Climax Studios, and features the show's original cast. That game won the award for "Performance in a Comedy, Lead" with John DiMaggio at the National Academy of Video Game Trade Reviewers Awards, in which Jeremy Shada was also nominated for the same category.

== Books ==
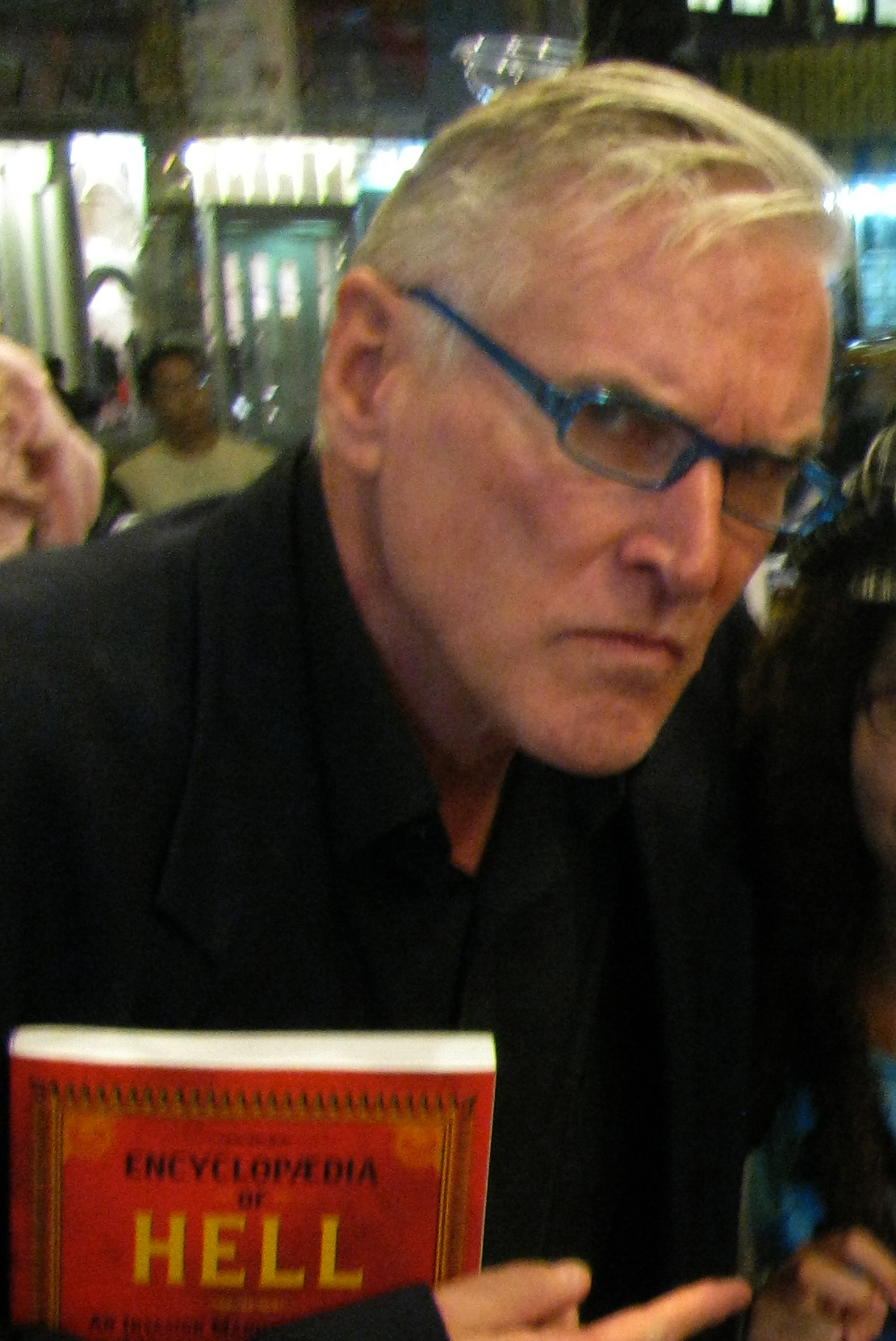
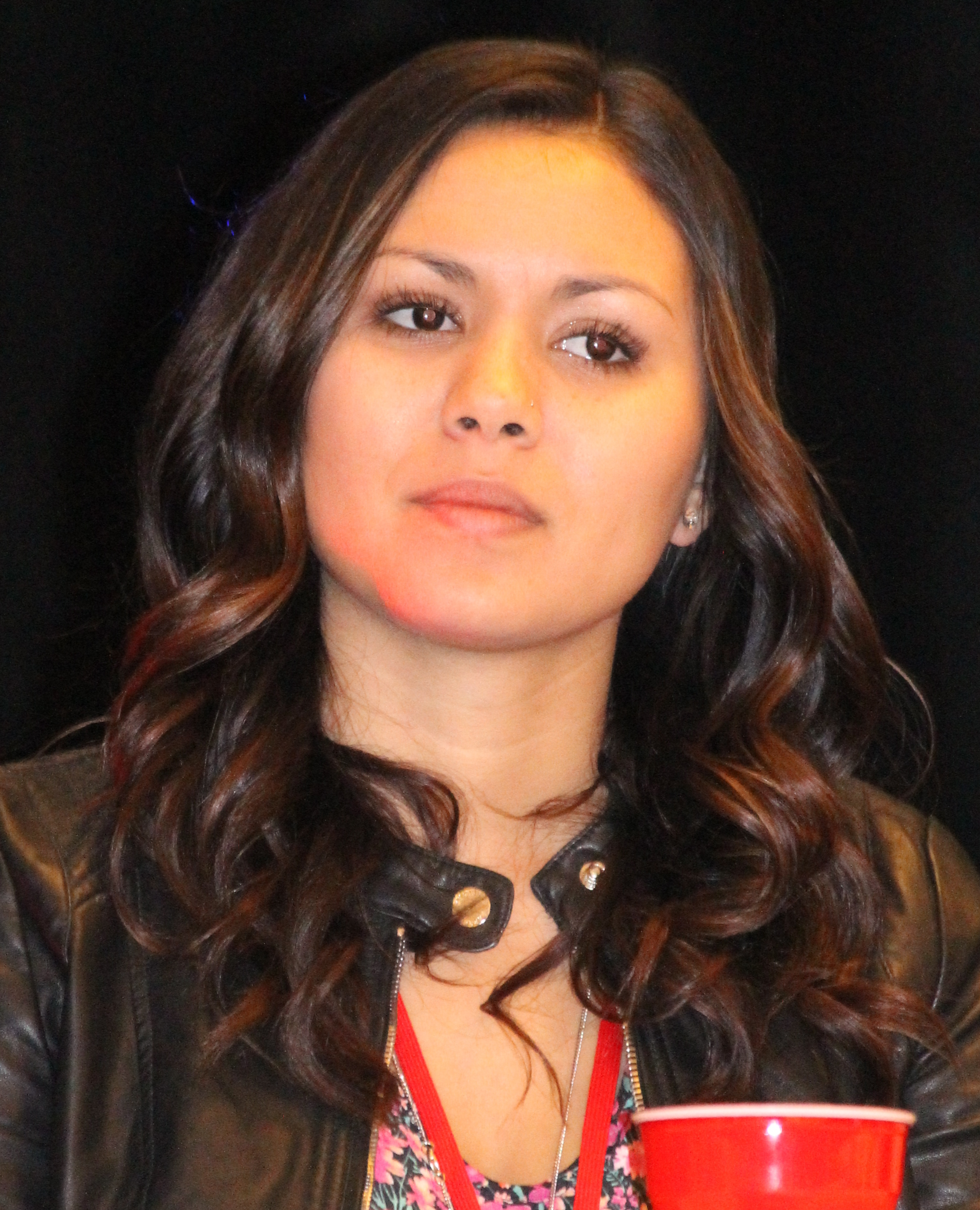
Martin Olson (left) and his daughter, Olivia Olson (right)

The Adventure Time Encyclopaedia, published on July 22, 2013, was written by comedian Martin Olson, father of Olivia Olson and the voice of recurring character Hunson Abadeer. This was followed by Adventure Time: The Enchiridion & Marcy's Super Secret Scrapbook!!!, which was released on October 6, 2015. Written by Martin and Olivia Olson, it is presented as a combination of the Enchiridion and Marceline's secret diary. An official Art of ... book, titled The Art of Ooo was published on October 14, 2014. It contains interviews with cast and crew members, and opens with an introduction by film-maker Guillermo del Toro. Two volumes with collections of the show's title cards have also been released, as well as a cookbook with recipes inspired by the show.

=== Epic Tales from Adventure Time (2014–2016) ===
A series of prose novels have been published under the header "Epic Tales from Adventure Time", which include The Untamed Scoundrel, Queen of Rogues, The Lonesome Outlaw, and The Virtue of Ardor, all of which were written by an author under the pseudonym "T. T. MacDangereuse".

== Merchandise ==
=== Home releases ===
On September 27, 2011, Cartoon Network released the region 1 DVD My Two Favorite People, which features a selection of twelve episodes from the series' first two seasons. Following this, several other region-1 compilation DVDs have been released, including: It Came from the Nightosphere (2012), Jake vs. Me-Mow (2012), Fionna and Cake (2013), Jake the Dad (2013), The Suitor (2014), Princess Day (2014), Adventure Time and Friends (2014), Finn the Human (2014), Frost & Fire (2015), The Enchiridion (2015), Stakes (2016), Card Wars (2016), and Islands (2017). All of the seasons have been released on DVD, and the first six have been released domestically on Blu-ray. A box set containing the entire series was released on DVD on April 30, 2019.

On March 30, 2013, the first season of Adventure Time was made available on the Netflix Instant Watch service for online streaming; the second season was made available on March 30, 2014. Both seasons were removed from Netflix on March 30, 2015. The series was made available for streaming via Hulu on May 1, 2015.

While in the United States, Max becomes the primary platform to watch Adventure Time: Distant Lands, there are debuts of "BMO," the first special of the spin-off series, in different countries and regions in respective Cartoon Network channels worldwide, on different dates mainly in 2020; such as October 24 (Turkey), October 25 (France), November 21 (the United Kingdom), December 12 (Germany, Australia, and Taiwan), and December 27 (Russia). In South Korea, the debut was on January 1, 2021.

=== Board and card games ===
A variety of officially licensed merchandise—including action figures, role-playing toys, bedding, dishware, and various other products—have been released. Since the dramatic increase in popularity of the series, many graphic T-shirts have been officially licensed through popular clothing retailers. Pendleton Ward hosted T-shirt designing contests on the websites of both We Love Fine and Threadless. Other shirts can be purchased directly from Cartoon Network's store. A collectible card game called Card Wars, inspired by the fourth-season episode of the same name, has been released.

=== Lego ===
On March 11, 2016, it was announced by Lego via Lego Ideas that an official Adventure Time Lego set from an idea by site user, aBetterMonkey, had met voting qualifications and was approved to be produced in cooperation with Cartoon Network. The set was released in January 2017.

=== Other ===
On July 21, 2013, Taiwan High Speed Rail and the Taiwan branch of Cartoon Network worked together on a project called "Cartoon Express" (歡樂卡通列車). The entire train was covered with characters from various Cartoon Network shows (including The Amazing World of Gumball, The Powerpuff Girls, Ben 10, and Regular Show), and the two sides of the train is painted with Finn and Jake respectively. Throughout the project, there were over 1,400 runs of the train and over 1.3 million of passengers were transported. Near the end, the Taiwan High Speed Rail also sold postcard as souvenirs for sale since August 23, 2014, and the project eventually ended on September 9, 2014. In addition, Cartoon Network established a waterpark named Cartoon Network Amazone in Chonburi, Thailand; it opened on October 3, 2014. Promoting the waterpark, Thai Smile painted Finn, Jake, Princess Bubblegum and Marceline on the planes.

Many official or unofficial Adventure Time books such as episode guides have been published.
