= Madeleine Martin =

American actress

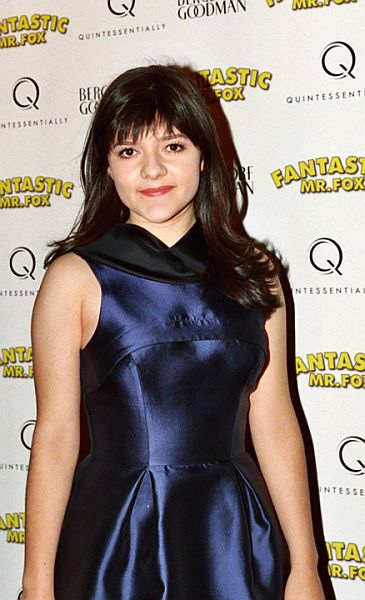
- Martin in October 2009
- Born: April 15, 1993 (age 33)
- Citizenship: United States
- Education: School of American Ballet
- Occupation: Actress
- Years active: 2000–present

Madeleine Martin (born April 15, 1993) is an American actress, known for voicing JoJo Tickle, the title character on the Playhouse Disney children's animated TV series JoJo's Circus and Fionna Campbell in the Cartoon Network series Adventure Time and its Max spin-off Adventure Time: Fionna and Cake, and for playing the character Rebecca "Becca" Moody on the Showtime comedy-drama Californication and Shelley Godfrey from the second and third seasons of the Netflix horror series Hemlock Grove.

== Early life ==
Martin grew up in New York in the United States. As her mother is from Canada, Martin has dual citizenship of both countries. Martin studied at the School of American Ballet and has an MFA degree from York University.

== Career ==
At age seven, Martin appeared in the Broadway National Tour of The Sound of Music with Richard Chamberlain. Two years later she portrayed young Cosette in the Broadway National Tour of Les Miserables. She appeared on Broadway in the title role in A Day in the Death of Joe Egg at the age of 10; her acclaimed performance gave her the opportunity to be the youngest presenter in history at the 2003 Tony Awards. The New York Times profiled her when she was 12 years old. She appeared onstage in The Pillowman alongside Jeff Goldblum and Billy Crudup. She acted in A Christmas Carol at Madison Square Garden.

Her first appearance on television came in 2003 on Law & Order, where she played the role of Annie for one episode. Also in 2003, she did the voice acting for the main character JoJo, in the cartoon TV series JoJo's Circus. She was a series regular on Disney's Out of the Box. She was called back in 2004 for another episode ("Sick"), on Law & Order: Special Victims Unit, as April. In 2005, she appeared for one episode on another TV series, Hope & Faith, as Ivana Charles.

She has also appeared in several TV commercials, including one for Staples (2004) with Alice Cooper.

In 2006, Martin was a voice actress in Ice Age: The Meltdown, where she voiced several roles. She returned to TV in 2007 to act alongside David Duchovny in the Showtime dramedy Californication as Becca Moody, Duchovny's character's teenage daughter. She performed several songs in Californication including "Only Women Bleed", "Don't Let Us Get Sick", and "Surrender". Martin originated the role of "Jean Fordham" on Broadway in the hit play August: Osage County.

In 2010, she was a co-star alongside John Cena in the WWE Studios film, Legendary. Her performance was heavily criticized.

She voiced Finn's female counterpart, Fionna, in the Adventure Time episodes "Fionna and Cake", "Bad Little Boy", "The Prince Who Wanted Everything", "Five Short Tables" and "Fionna and Cake and Fionna"— and voiced the character in the spin-off series Adventure Time: Fionna and Cake. She also appeared in the Criminal Minds Season 7 episode "Heathridge Manor".

Martin performed in the Atlantic Theater Company's production of Harper Regan in 2012 and on Broadway in Picnic in 2013.

From 2014 to 2016, she played Shelley Godfrey in the second and third seasons of Hemlock Grove and had a guest role on The Good Wife. She performed in the Lincoln Center production of The Harvest in the winter of 2016. In 2019, she portrayed Madeline in The Marvelous Mrs. Maisel, a recurring character in the third season. The character is a colleague of Abe's (the titular character's father) in his fight in rebellious causes.

Outside of acting, Martin is also an assistant professor at Florida State University.

== Filmography ==
=== Film ===
Year	Title	Role	Notes
2006	Ice Age: The Meltdown	Additional voices	
2007	Night of the Living Cat Girl	Hitomi	Video
2010	Legendary	Luli Stringfellow	
2012	The Discoverers	Zoe	
2012	Refuge	Lucy	

=== Television ===
Year	Title	Role	Notes
2003, 2008	Law & Order	Annie, Emma Waxman	Episodes: "Compassion", "Betrayal"
2003–2007	JoJo's Circus	JoJo Tickle (voice)	Main role
2003–2004	Out of the Box	Maddie	Main role (season 3)
2004	Law & Order: Special Victims Unit	April	Episode: "Sick"
2005	Hope & Faith	Ivana Charles	Episode: "Hope Couture"
2007–2014	Californication	Rebecca 'Becca' Moody	Main role (season 1–6), guest (season 7)
2011, 2013–2014, 2016–2017	Adventure Time	Fionna (voice)	Guest role (seasons 3, 5–7, 9)
2012	Criminal Minds	Lara Heathridge	Episode: "Heathridge Manor"
2014	The Good Wife	Jody Milam	Episode: "Red Zone"
2014	My Daughter Must Live	Katie O'Malley	TV film
2014–2015	Hemlock Grove	Shelley Godfrey	Recurring role (season 2), main (season 3)
2019	The Marvelous Mrs. Maisel	Madeline	Episodes: "It's the Sixties, Man!", "Hands!", "It's Comedy or Cabbage"
2020	What We Do in the Shadows	Lucy	Episode: "On the Run"
2021	Flawless: A Feminist Fairytale	Whitney	Episode: "Hump Day"
2023–present	Adventure Time: Fionna and Cake	Fionna (voice)	Main role
