= Niki Yang =

South Korean voice actress

- Born: Hyun Jeong Yang; Seoul, South Korea
- Other name: Niki Hyun Yang
- Occupations: Animator; writer; storyboard artist; voice actress
- Years active: 2006–present

Korean name
- Hangul: 양현정
- RR: Yang Hyeonjeong
- MR: Yang Hyŏnjŏng

Niki Hyun Yang (born in Seoul, South Korea as Hyun Jeong Yang (Korean: 양현정)) is a South Korean animator, writer, storyboard artist, and voice actress. After graduating from Hongik University and then CalArts, she became one of the storyboard artists of Family Guy before moving to Frederator Studios. She is best known for voicing BMO and Lady Rainicorn on the Cartoon Network series Adventure Time.

== Filmography ==
List of television performances
| Year | Title | Role | Notes/Ref. |
|---|---|---|---|
| 2008 | Random! Cartoons | Baby Rabbit | Episode: "The Two Witch Sisters"; Also served as a voice director |
| 2010–2018 | Adventure Time | Lady Rainicorn / BMO | Main role (Note: In the series, Yang speaks Korean and English in her respective roles.) |
| 2012–2016 | Gravity Falls | Candy Chiu | Recurring role |
| 2014 | TripTank | Michiko | Recurring role; "Flower Teen Kill Team GO!" |
| 2015 | We Bare Bears | Winifred Park | 6 episodes |
| 2019–2023 | Summer Camp Island | The Egg, Shortcake | 4 episodes |
| 2020 | Adventure Time: Distant Lands | BMO | Episode: "BMO" |
| 2020–2021 | The Fungies! | Lil' Lemon | Recurring role |
| 2020 | Animaniacs | Defensive Fan #5 | Episode: "Gift Rapped" |
| 2021 | Wild Help | Turnip, Umma | Pilot |
| 2021 | Infinity Train | Min-Gi's Mother / Announcer | Episode: "The Twin Tapes" |
| 2022 | We Baby Bears | Sylvia | Episode: "Dragon Pests" |
| 2023-2025 | Adventure Time: Fionna and Cake | BMO Alarm Clock / BMO | 6 episodes |
| 2026 | Adventure Time: Side Quests | BMO | |

=== Pilots ===
| Year | Title | Notes/Ref. |
|---|---|---|
| 2008 | Two Witch Sisters | Nickelodeon Series Pilot (Random! Cartoons) |
| 2009 | Victor the Delivery Dog | Nickelodeon Series Pilot (Random! Cartoons) |
| 2015 | Yoyotoki Happy Ears | Amazon Original Series Pilot |
| 2021 | Wild Help | Cartoon Network Series Pilot |

=== Video games ===
| Year | Title | Role | Notes |
|---|---|---|---|
| 2012 | Adventure Time: Hey Ice King! Why'd You Steal Our Garbage?!! | BMO | |
| 2013 | Adventure Time: Explore the Dungeon Because I Don't Know! | BMO / Lady Rainicorn | |
| 2015 | Lego Dimensions | BMO / Lady Rainicorn | While BMO is a playable character, Lady Rainicorn is not. |
| 2015 | Adventure Time: Finn & Jake Investigations | BMO | |
| 2018 | Adventure Time: Pirates of the Enchiridion | BMO | |
| 2022 | MultiVersus | BMO / Lady Rainicorn | |

=== Production roles ===
| Year | Title | Writer | Storyboard Artist | Director | Notes/Ref. |
|---|---|---|---|---|---|
| 2006–08 | Family Guy | No | Yes | No | |
| 2007–09 | Slacker Cats | No | Yes | No | |
| 2009–10 | Fanboy & Chum Chum | No | Yes | No | |
| 2010 | Adventure Time | Yes | Yes | No | |
| 2010–14 | Fish Hooks | Yes | Yes | No | |
| 2012–16 | Gravity Falls | No | Yes | No | |
| 2013 | Bravest Warriors | Yes | Yes | No | (mini-episode: "Moo-Phobia") |
| 2014–2018 | Clarence | Yes | Yes | Yes | (mini-episode: "Beauford T. Pusser ") |
| 2015 | Harvey Beaks | No | Yes | No | (episode: "Harvey Fights Kratz") |
| 2018–2025 | Craig of the Creek | Yes | Yes | No | |
| 2018–2023 | Summer Camp Island | No | No | Yes | |
| 2026 | Adventure Time: Side Quests | No | No | Yes | |
