= Fionna and Cake (episode) =

- Adventure Time episode
- Episode no.: Season 3 Episode 9
- Directed by: Larry Leichliter
- Written by: Adam Muto; Rebecca Sugar
- Story by: Mark Banker; Kent Osborne; Patrick McHale; Pendleton Ward
- Production code: 1008-058
- Original air date: September 5, 2011
- Running time: 11 minutes

Episode chronology
← Previous "Wizard Battle"	Next → "What Was Missing"
- Adventure Time season 3

"Fionna and Cake" is the ninth episode of the third season of the American animated television series Adventure Time. The episode was written and storyboarded by Adam Muto and Rebecca Sugar, from a story by Mark Banker, Kent Osborne, Patrick McHale, and series creator Pendleton Ward. It originally aired on Cartoon Network on September 5, 2011.

In this episode, series protagonists Finn (voiced by Jeremy Shada) and Jake (voiced by John DiMaggio) are forced to listen to The Ice King's fan fiction about the gender-swapped Fionna (voiced by Madeleine Martin) and Cake the cat (voiced by Roz Ryan). In his story, Fionna goes on a date with Prince Gumball (voiced by Neil Patrick Harris) and fights the evil Ice Queen (voiced by Grey DeLisle).

The concept of Fionna and Cake was based on sketches that series' character designer and storyboard revisionist Natasha Allegri made. Ward was pleased with her creations, and decided to canonize them. Originally, the episode did not feature the Ice Queen at all, and the middle part of the episode saw Fionna go on a date with Gumball to a restaurant; this subsequently changed. The episode was watched by 3.315 million people, making it—at the time—the most-watched episode of the series. "Fionna and Cake" received largely positive reviews from fans and critics alike. Two sequels to the episode—"Bad Little Boy" and "The Prince Who Wanted Everything"—were produced during the show's fifth and sixth season, respectively as well as a comic book miniseries titled Adventure Time with Fionna and Cake published by kaBOOM along with a spin-off series featuring the characters titled Adventure Time: Fionna and Cake.

== Plot ==
Fionna and Cake are helping Prince Gumball decorate for the Biennial Gumball Ball when Gumball asks Fionna if she would like to go to it tonight with him. Their conversation is interrupted when the Ice Queen breaks into the castle and tries to kidnap Gumball. Fionna and Cake start to fight her before she mysteriously disappears. Gumball (who is apparently unharmed) arranges a date with Fionna. At the Tree Fort, Fionna and Cake argue over whether or not Gumball asked Fionna on a date. Cake decides to come along to help Fionna out. At the Castle Gardens, the two are met by Gumball and his steed Lord Monochromicorn. The group then flies through the air while Gumball serenades Fionna with the song "Oh, Fionna" and eventually asks her to be his girlfriend. When Fionna and Cake get to the ball, Prince Gumball takes Fionna to his room (decorated with candles and rose petals) and locks the door. She becomes flustered and backs away when he begins to take his shirt off. A drop of water lands on her shoulder, she looks up to see the real Prince Gumball trapped inside a giant icicle on the ceiling. The fake prince is revealed to be Ice Queen. Fionna is soon incapacitated; Cake senses trouble and rushes to her rescue.

Enraged by the deception, Fionna takes out the crystal sword to fight. The sword turns out to be another one of Ice Queen's tricks and turns into a ball of ice around Fionna's hands. Cake hears noises from upstairs and senses Fionna is in trouble. Undaunted, Fionna uses the ice to beat Ice Queen over the head. Ice Queen pushes her off with a burst of snow which allows Fionna to get close to enough to break Prince Gumball free and knock out the Ice Queen with a broken icicle. Cake bursts in and sees Gumball standing next to Fionna in her torn dress; she jumps to the wrong conclusion and lunges at him but Fionna stops Cake and tells her it was the Ice Queen all along. Just then Ice Queen recovers and blasts Cake away from Fionna only to have Fionna knock her magic tiara off which negates her powers. The real Gumball asks Fionna on a date and is turned down; Fionna notes that she does not need a boyfriend at the moment—unless it were the Ice King.

The episode quickly reveals itself to be a fanfiction story created by the Ice King, who is reading it to an imprisoned Finn and Jake. The Ice King asks how they enjoyed his story; Finn hesitates at first but hurriedly placates him when Ice King threatens them with his ice powers.

== Cast ==
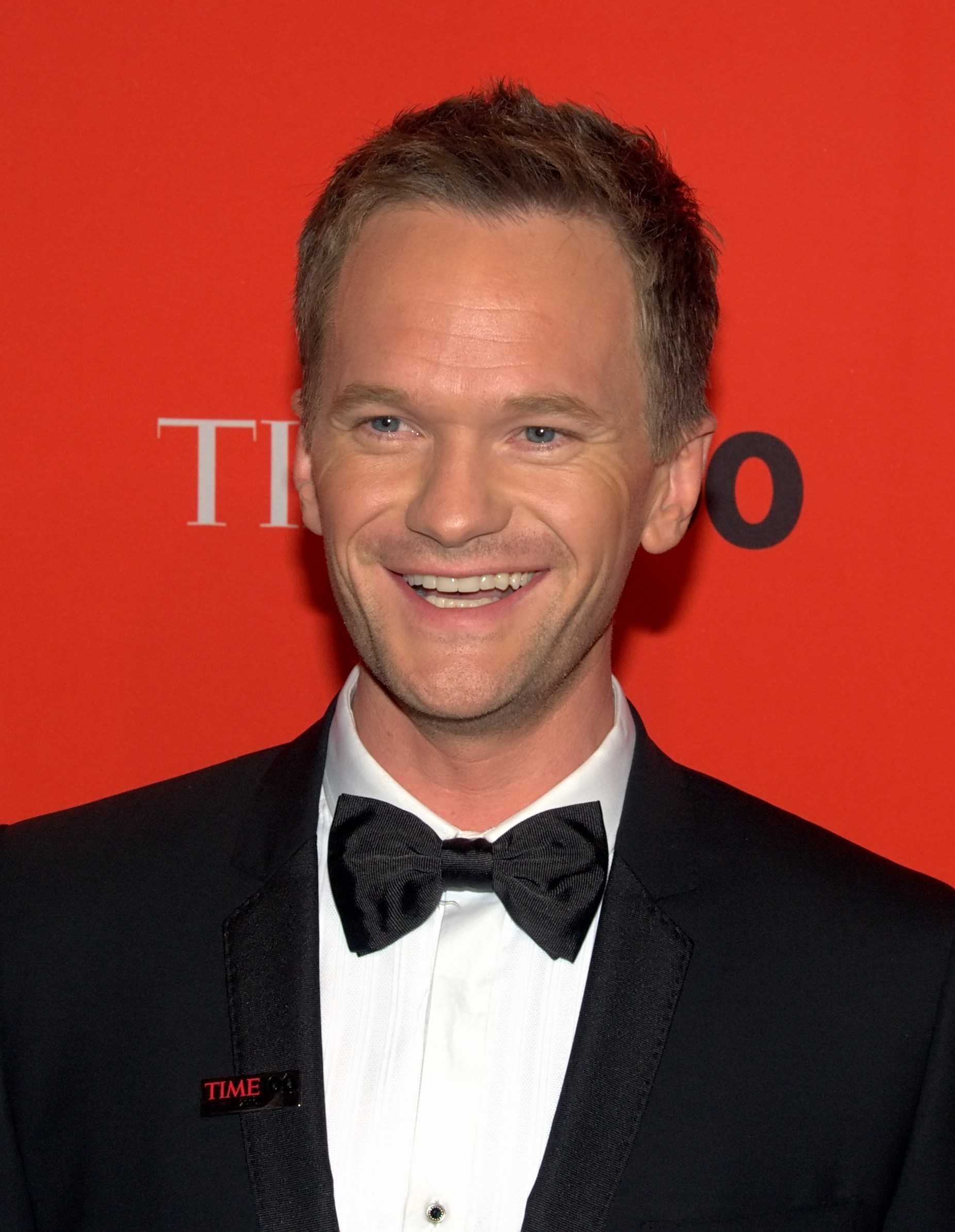
Neil Patrick Harris voiced Prince Gumball in the episode

"Fionna and Cake", taking place in a gender-swapped universe, likewise features gender-swapped versions of the inhabitants of Ooo. A list of the major characters that feature in "Fionna and Cake" follows.

- Fionna (voiced by Madeleine Martin) – Fionna is the gender-swapped version of Finn. Fionna is a brave and adventurous girl who struggles with issues pertaining to attraction and romance.
- Cake (voiced by Roz Ryan) – Cake is the gender-swapped version of Jake, and is a cat instead of a dog. Cake is sarcastic and boisterous but is also Fionna's loyal friend. Much like Jake, she possesses the power to stretch her body into a myriad of convoluted shapes.
- Prince Gumball (voiced by Neil Patrick Harris) – Gumball is the gender-swapped version of Princess Bubblegum. He is the ruler of the Candy Kingdom and is the frequent victim of the Ice Queen's kidnapping schemes.
- Ice Queen (voiced by Grey DeLisle) – The Ice Queen is the gender-swapped version of the Ice King. Much like her male counterpart, the Ice Queen is constantly scheming to kidnap a mate (her most frequent target being Prince Gumball).
- Lord Monochromicorn – The gender-swapped version of Lady Rainicorn. While Lady speaks primarily in Korean, Lord Monochromicorn communicates exclusively via Morse code. Lord Monochromicorn and Cake are in a relationship together.

== Production ==
"Fionna and Cake" was written and storyboarded by Rebecca Sugar and Adam Muto from a story developed by Mark Banker, Patrick McHale, Osborne, and series creator Pendleton Ward; it was directed by Larry Leichliter. The genesis for the episode were drawings that character designer and storyboard revisionist Natasha Allegri posted online. Her creations were eventually canonized by the show's producers. Allegri even re-rerecorded the show's theme—which had originally been sung by series creator Pendleton Ward—for the episode. Sugar intended "Fionna and Cake" to both be "a jab [and] a huge celebration of, [sic] the feeling of being fan" and "allowing something completely ridiculous to make your heart tighten".

Sugar and Muto significantly changed the story from its original outline, as the very first version of the episode did not feature the Ice Queen, the ball, or the crystal sword. The second act of the story featured Gumball and Fionna going on a date in a restaurant, rather than on an adventure. Sugar also wrote several lines for Marshall Lee—Marceline's male counterpart—but they were cut for time. Sugar "begged" Ward to let her work the character back into the story somehow, but the character only appeared in a non-speaking cameo. Sugar originally wanted the character to be voiced by Dante Basco, although he would later be voiced by Donald Glover in subsequent Fionna and Cake episodes.

Neil Patrick Harris was Sugar's first choice to play Prince Gumball; she explained that she "wanted to impress [her] brother Steven, who was obsessed with the Music Meister" (portrayed by Harris) "from Batman: The Brave and the Bold at the time." The scene which featured the song "Oh Fionna" was designed by Sugar to be a blend of the setting from the song "A Whole New World" from the 1992 film Aladdin, as well as scenes featuring the Romani Ranch aliens from the video game The Legend of Zelda: Majora's Mask (2000).

== Reception ==
"Fionna and Cake" aired on Cartoon Network on September 5, 2011. The episode was viewed by 3.315 million viewers and saw a dramatic increase in the ratings for all boy demographics. It also marked a 42 percent increase in viewers when compared to a year earlier. At the time, this made "Fionna and Cake" the highest-rated entry of the series. The episode first saw physical release as part of the 2013 Fionna and Cake DVD, which included 16 episodes from the series' second, third, and fourth seasons.

Tyler Foster of DVD Talk praised the episode for its creativity and complimented the entry's humor and its message to girls. Furthermore, he applauded the song "Oh Fionna", calling it "wonderful". Richard Whittaker of The Austin Chronicle noted that the episode was "an adventure in cross play". He felt that Fionna's characterization appealed to the show's universality and managed to also retain respect for the show's audience and that the "strong but emotionally vulnerable" Cake was written in a way that successfully provided a female analog for Jake.

Oliver Sava of The A.V. Club called the "Fionna and Cake" one of "the most fascinating aspects of the Adventure Time craze" in a review of the fifth-season episode "Bad Little Boy". He wrote that "'Fionna and Cake' was reminiscent of the series' earlier episodes, in regard to its bright animation, well-paced plot, music, its successful blend of fantasy action and comedy, and its focus on character-based drama. As a result, he felt that the entry was composed of elements that make the series as a whole great. In a separate article, Sava named the entry one of the ten most representative episodes of the series and wrote that it is also "the most aggressively girl-friendly episode of the series".

After it aired, "Fionna and Cake" was particularly successful with the fans of the series. Sava noted that although the characters had, at the time, appeared in only a single episode, they had rapidly become among the series' most popular characters. According to the Entertainment Examiner, fans of the series responded positively to the characters, and wanted them to appear in more episodes.
