= Fionna Campbell =

Fictional character in Adventure Time

- Adventure Time character
- Fionna, as seen in Adventure Time: Fionna and Cake
- First appearance: "Fionna and Cake"; Adventure Time; September 5, 2011
- Created by: Natasha Allegri
- Based on: Finn the Human
- Voiced by: Madeleine Martin

In-universe information
- Nickname: Fionna the Human
- Species: Human
- Gender: Female

Fionna Campbell, also called Fionna the Human, is a fictional character from the Adventure Time franchise. She was first introduced in the Adventure Time episode "Fionna and Cake" as a genderbent version of the show's lead character Finn the Human. She is the protagonist of the HBO Max series Adventure Time: Fionna and Cake.

== Creation and development ==
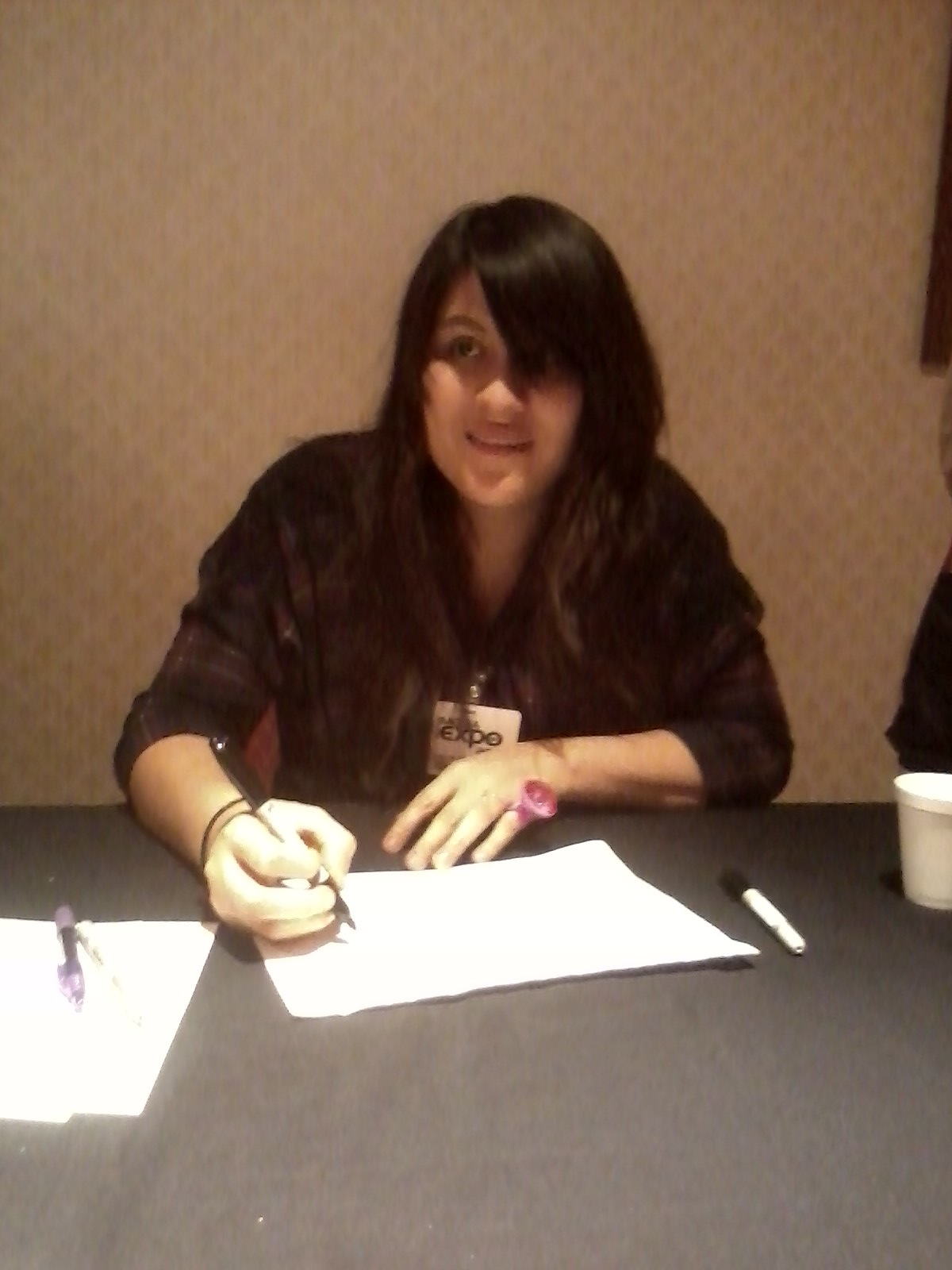
Natasha Allegri created the character of Fionna (2014)

Fionna Campbell and Cake the Cat were created by Adventure Time storyboard artist Natasha Allegri as fan art. Fionna Campbell was originally created as a genderbent version of Finn the Human, the protagonist of the series Adventure Time, while Cake was a genderbent and species swapped version of Finn's brother Jake the Dog. In an interview with Comic Book Resources, Allegri stated that she first designed the characters after someone on an online forum requested that she draw genderbent fan art.

Allegri shared her drawings of the characters on Tumblr, where they become popular with fans, later sending them to Frederator Studios, one of the production companies behind Adventure Time. As a result of fan feedback, the characters appeared in the third season Adventure Time episode "Fionna and Cake". Fionna is voiced by American actress Madeleine Martin. The character subsequently appeared in other episodes of the series.

In August 2021, it was announced that HBO Max had greenlit a young adult animated series focusing on the characters of Fionna and Cake. When creating the Fionna and Cake series, showrunner Adam Muto stated that he wanted to focus on a character who was more normal than Finn, and wrote Fionna to be less selfless than Finn and more of an unskilled fighter.

== Appearances ==
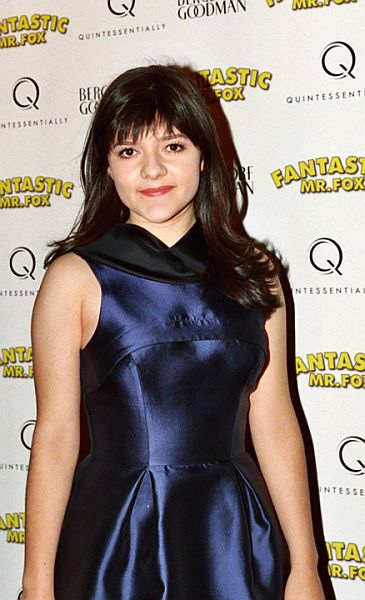
Fionna is voiced by Madeleine Martin

=== Adventure Time ===
Fionna first appeared in Adventure Time in the third season episode "Fionna and Cake". At the end of the episode, it is revealed that Fionna and Cake are characters within a fanfiction being written by Ice King.

=== Fionna and Cake ===
Fionna is the protagonist of Adventure Time: Fionna and Cake, with Madeleine Martin reprising her role as the character. The series focuses on Fionna's life in an alternate version of the Adventure Time universe that does not include magic. In that universe, she is a normal person working through a series of unsatisfying jobs who yearns to go on magical adventures. Fionna experiences strange dreams of a magical world which she believes have a greater meaning.

Together with her cat Cake, Fionna emerges from the head of their creator Simon Petrikov, the former Ice King, and find themselves inside of the magical universe of Ooo. The trio then go on adventures across the multiverse in the hopes of recovering the ice crown so that Simon will have magical powers again and can restore magic to their world. In the series, it is revealed that Prismo the Wishmaster had created a real universe and concealed it inside of the Ice King's mind, which is why magic left their world when the Ice King's madness was cured and he became Simon Petrikov.

=== Comics ===
Fionna was also the protagonist of the six-issue comics miniseries Adventure Time: Fionna and Cake which was published by Boom! Studios.

== Characteristics and personality ==
Fionna is a genderbent version of Finn the Human, and bears many traits in common with him as they are both tough and adventurous. She is portrayed as a teenager in the Adventure Time series, while Finn is a preteen. Like Finn, Fionna experiences complicated romantic desires, although she is not shown to suffer as greatly from lovesickness or unrequited desire as Finn, and she asserts that she does not need a romantic relationship to define herself.

In the Fionna and Cake spinoff, Fionna is portrayed as an adult in her 20s, who spends her time working menial jobs by day while dreaming of magical adventures at night.

== Reception ==
=== Critical reception ===
The character's portrayal in both Adventure Time and Adventure Time Fionna and Cake has been praised by television critics.

==== Adventure Time ====
The character's introduction in the original Adventure Time series was positively received by critics and fans. Fionna's debut episode "Fionna and Cake" received the show's highest ever ratings at the time. Richard Whittaker of The Austin Chronicle wrote positively about the character, writing that the series' "[recreation of] the awkwardly pubescent Finn as the awkwardly tomboyish Fionna taps into the show's universality".

In a review of season three, Oliver Sava of The A.V. Club wrote that the introduction of Fionna and Cake were part of a strategy to appeal to female viewers, and called Fionna's debut episode "the most aggressively girl-friendly episode of the series". Sava gave the episode a positive review, praising the portrayal of Fionna and Martin's vocal performance, which he described as having "a youthful energy but also a pubescent scratchiness".

In Heroes, Heroines, and Everything in Between: Challenging Gender and Sexuality Stereotypes in Children's Entertainment Media, media studies scholars Christopher J. Olson and Carrie-Lynn D. Reinhardt write that Fionna's portrayal in Adventure Time subverts stereotypical gender norms.

==== Fionna and Cake ====
The character's portrayal in Adventure Time: Fionna and Cake was mostly well received by critics, who praised the character's evolution since her original debut. Several critics noted that the character had become older and more grounded, making her more relatable to fans of the series who had grown into adults. Gary Catig of AIPT wrote that the character's narrative arc focused on struggles common to young adults including self-discovery and a desire for independence.

Chase Hutchinson of IGN described Fionna's struggle to make ends meet while dreaming of a more magical world as "painfully relatable". In a review for Den of Geek, Rendy Jones also praised the character's relatable struggles, writing that she and Cake "evolve beyond their once stunt-marketed gender-flipped archetypes and grow as their own unique beings."

John Daniel Tangalin of The Cinema Spot praised the character of Fionna, comparing her complex relationship to memory and dreams to other fictional characters such as Dolores Abernathy from Westworld and Neo from The Matrix.

=== Fandom ===
Since her debut, the character has been popular among the franchise's fanbase, and is frequently portrayed by cosplayers and fan artists. In 2013, Sava noted that Fionna had become one of "the most beloved characters on the show" despite only appearing in one episode to date. Chris Sims of ComicsAlliance compared the character's popularity at fan conventions to that of Ramona Flowers from Scott Pilgrim.
