= Adventure Time: Fionna and Cake =

American adult animated television series

- Genre: Adult animation Action adventure Comedy
- Based on: Adventure Time by Pendleton Ward Characters by Natasha Allegri
- Developed by: Adam Muto
- Showrunner: Adam Muto
- Story by: Jack Pendarvis; Kate Tsang; Hanna K. Nyström; Anthony Burch (season 1); Adam Muto
- Voices of: Madeleine Martin; Roz Ryan; Tom Kenny
- Composer: Amanda Jones
- Country of origin: United States
- Original language: English
- No. of seasons: 2
- No. of episodes: 20

Production
- Executive producers: Adam Muto; Fred Seibert; Sam Register
- Producer: Debora Arroyo
- Running time: 23–26 minutes
- Production companies: Frederator Studios (season 1); FredFilms (season 2); Cartoon Network Studios

Original release
- Network: Max
- Release: August 31 – September 28, 2023
- Network: HBO Max
- Release: October 23, 2025 – present

Related
- Adventure Time franchise

Adventure Time: Fionna and Cake (also simply known as Fionna and Cake) is an American adult animated television series developed by Adam Muto for the streaming service HBO Max. It is a spin-off of the Cartoon Network series Adventure Time (2010–2018) and the third main installment in the Adventure Time franchise. The series debuted on August 31, 2023, and the second season premiered on October 23, 2025.

The series follows the eponymous Fionna and Cake the Cat, alternate-universe versions of Finn the Human and Jake the Dog. Fred Seibert and Sam Register serve as executive producers alongside Muto, who himself served as showrunner for the last six seasons of Adventure Time and oversaw production of the Distant Lands specials.

== Synopsis ==
Where Adventure Time follows the adventures of Finn the Human and Jake the Dog, Fionna and Cake follows Finn and Jake's gender-swapped counterparts, Fionna the Human and Cake the Cat. The spin-off centers around Fionna Campbell, a young woman in a universe without magic who lives with her cat, Cake. In the first season, they have multiversal adventures with Simon Petrikov—better known throughout much of Adventure Time as the Ice King—while the second season expands their journey through the involvement of Huntress Wizard.

== Cast ==
=== Main ===
- Madeleine Martin as Fionna Campbell
- Roz Ryan as Cake the Cat
- Tom Kenny as Simon Petrikov
- Sean Rohani (season 1), Kumail Nanjiani (season 2) as Prismo
- Kayleigh McKee as the Scarab
- Ashly Burch as Huntress Wizard (season 2)

=== Supporting ===
- Jeremy Shada as Finn the Human (Note: Shada also voices several multiversal variations of Finn, including Farmworld Finn and Baby Finn.)
- Hynden Walch as Princess Bubblegum
- Olivia Olson as Marceline the Vampire Queen
- Andrew Rannells (season 1), Harvey Guillén (season 2) as Gary Prince
- Donald Glover (season 1), Kris Kollins (season 2) as Marshall Lee
- Vico Ortiz as Hunter
- Manny Jacinto as DJ Flame
- Anna Akana as Fennel (Note: Vico Ortiz voices Fennel (credited as "Fern") in the series premiere.)

== Episodes ==
Season	Episodes	Originally released		
Season	Episodes	First released	Last released	Network
1	10	August 31, 2023	September 28, 2023	Max
2	10	October 23, 2025	December 25, 2025	HBO Max

=== Season 1 (2023) ===
No. overall	No. in season	Title	Supervising director	Written and storyboarded by	Original release date
1	1	"Fionna Campbell"	Ryann Shannon	Hanna K. Nyström, Anna Syvertsson, Jacob Winkler, & Haewon Lee	August 31, 2023
Fionna Campbell, a young woman who lives alone with her cat Cake in the city, dreams of having fantastic adventures, and is cynical and depressed despite having friends and acquaintances. When Cake begins behaving oddly, Fionna's trip to the vet results in her getting fired from her job. She is eventually directed to the bizarre Ellis P. and openly admits to him her own personal insecurities. Cake suddenly chases after a mysterious blue light and jumps into an ice cream vendor's stand where she mysteriously disappears.
2	2	"Simon Petrikov"	Steve Wolfhard	Iggy Craig, Graham Falk, Jim Campbell, & Lucyola Langi	August 31, 2023
Simon Petrikov works in a personalized 20th-century home for visitors in the land of Ooo, only to be tormented by his past as the Ice King, who authored the Fionna and Cake stories; an adventure with Finn Mertens and a one-sided phone call with Marceline leaves him even more dejected and isolated. Later, Simon attempts to perform a ritual to revive Betty, his fiancée who disappeared after fusing with the malevolent entity GOLB. Instead, a portal appears on the back of his head that brings Cake into his world.
3	3	"Cake the Cat"	Ryann Shannon	Hanna K. Nyström, Anna Syvertsson, Jacob Winkler, Haewon Lee, & Nicole Rodriguez	September 7, 2023
A depressed Prismo ignores nonstop alarm in the Time Room of Cake's crossover, instead watching Finn and Jake's adventures; Cake flees with Simon's voice translator and explores in Ooo, inadvertently causing mayhem in a market. Fionna witnesses Cake's disappearance and desperately tries to find her, and she later arrives in Ooo via another portal Simon created. With the help of Astrid, a young fan of the Fionna and Cake books, Fionna reunites with Cake, but the two are suddenly teleported away.
4	4	"Prismo the Wishmaster"	Steve Wolfhard	Iggy Craig, Graham Falk, Jim Campbell, & Lucyola Langi	September 7, 2023
Prismo teleports Fionna, Cake, and Simon to the Time Room, revealing that he created an unauthorized universe of Fionna and Cake and surreptitiously hid it within the Ice King's mind; after the Ice King was turned back into Simon, the universe lost its magical qualities. Scarab, a regular auditor, visits the Time Room for investigation, where he finds Fionna, Cake, and Simon; however, Prismo gives the trio a remote to escape. Simon suggests to the duo about him being the Ice King again, so as to solve their problems.
5	5	"Destiny"	Ryann Shannon	Hanna K. Nyström, Anna Syvertsson, Jacob Winkler, & Sonja von Marensdorff	September 14, 2023
Fionna, Cake, and Simon search for the crown in the Farmworld, where they met Jay, son of Farmworld Finn, assisting in their search. Later, Jay and the trio go to the crater where the crown once sat, where they merely find some remaining shards, as it was removed and destroyed by Prismo, before being seized by the Destiny Gang. Scarab, just capturing Prismo, finds the crater and is teleported away along with the trio, who take a shard to fix Prismo's remote.
6	6	"The Winter King"	Steve Wolfhard	Iggy Craig, Graham Falk, Jim Campbell, Lucyola Langi, & Nicole Rodriguez	September 14, 2023
Gary meets Marshall Lee in Fionna's apartment, and they go shopping for a baking project, which the Lemoncarb twins later reject. Simon, Fionna, and Cake meet the Winter King, an alternate Simon who retained sanity; the two Simons are kidnapped by the Candy Queen, a Princess Bubblegum projected the crown's madness by the Winter King. Fionna saves Simon and accidentally deactivates the crown, killing the Winter King and lifting the curse. The trio flees, as Scarab continues to pursue them.
7	7	"The Star"	Ryann Shannon	Iggy Craig, Graham Falk, Jacob Winkler, & Sonja von Marensdorff	September 21, 2023
In an alternate reality where a non-magical Simon has been killed by vampires, Cake is recruited by Bonnie and her vampire-hunting team for the crown possessed by the Vampire King, who adopted Marceline. When the raid fails, Simon leaves this reality again with Fionna and Cake. Meanwhile, Gary and Marshall Lee attend a charity ball held by Marshall's mother, Hana Abadeer, who wants her son to join the family business. Sensing that this is against Marshall Lee's will, Gary leaves with him and kiss in an elevator.
8	8	"Jerry"	Steve Wolfhard	Hanna K. Nyström, Anna Syvertsson, Jim Campbell, & Jackie Files	September 21, 2023
In a lifeless alternate reality, BMO lives alone before meeting the trio; Fionna finds some old tapes documenting the Ice King's madness, and BMO dies after unsuccessfully trying to fix the broken remote. They find BMO's friend, "Jerry", who is actually the Lich in this lifeless reality Prismo created by the wish. Simon resumes the magic ritual to create a portal returning Fionna and Cake to their universe. Scarab arrives just as Simon is about to put on the crown Fionna found, but a red portal appears and they both fall into it.
9	9	"Casper & Nova"	Ryann Shannon	Iggy Craig, Graham Falk, Jacob Winkler, & Sonja von Marensdorff	September 28, 2023
Fionna and Cake return to their universe yet to become magical. GOLB crushes the Lich and transfers Simon's consciousness into Shermy in the future Land of Ooo; as Shermy, Simon visits the library with Beth for a choose-your-own-adventure book, featuring characters named Casper and Nova, and he manages to find clues to escape. Turned into mites by GOLB, Scarab invades Fionna's world as mites and at first contained, but Ellis P. frees them out of ignorance, allowing Scarab to reform.
10	10	"Cheers"	Steve Wolfhard	Hanna K. Nyström, Anna Syvertsson, Jim Campbell, & Jackie Files	September 28, 2023
Scarab attempts to erase Fionna's world. Simon uses all of Casper's decisions in the game and ultimately dooms Nova, realizing that he overlooked Betty's sacrifice; before returning to his universe, he gives Fionna a magical dandelion, which Fionna blows to help "Fionna-world" become an authorized universe, undoing Scarab's damage in the process. After the war, Scarab works for Prismo in the Time Room, and Fionna and Simon keep in touch with their still-working multiversal phone line.

=== Season 2 (2025) ===
No. overall	No. in season	Title	Supervising director	Written and storyboarded by	Original release date
11	1	"The Hare and the Sprout"	Ryann Shannon	Hanna K. Nyström, Kris Mukai, Maya Petersen, & Charmaine Verhagen	October 23, 2025
In Marceline's house, Astrid narrates her hand-drawn story to Simon, which reminds Princess Bubblegum that she hasn't seen Finn lately; in fact, Finn becomes seriously ill from the wound on his back sustained in the previous season. Huntress Wizard brings Finn to Simon in WizArts for help, and she flies to the Heart of the Forest. Fionna helps Gary with his new café, the Sweet Spot, but Queenie reveals that she owns the lot and evicts them.
12	2	"The Crocodile Who Bit a Log"	Cole Sanchez	Iggy Craig, Graham Falk, Monty Ray & Jackie Files	October 30, 2025
A flashback depicts how Huntress gained magic. Fionna attempts to infiltrate the Sweet Spot and later plans to buy it from Queenie. To save Finn, Huntress faces Green Wizards and collects some sap from the Heart of the Forest, which accidentally disables their magic, and she falls into a portal where her body blows apart, turning into seeds and scattering across dimensions. She arrives in Fionna-world as a seed, while Fionna is on the phone with Simon, who is with Finn, in an ambulance to the Candy Kingdom.
13	3	"The Lion of Embers"	Ryann Shannon	Hanna K. Nyström, Kris Mukai, Maya Petersen, & Charmaine Verhagen	November 6, 2025
A flashback features the moment Fionna-world lost magic. Fionna, now with her friends, plan a fundraiser for the Sweet Spot; Prismo and the Cosmic Owl watch Huntress, struggling for water as a seed, and tell Scarab that it is not their jurisdiction. In the Candy Kingdom, many princesses attempt to save Finn with a kiss. Seeing DJ Flame with Fennel, Fionna drunkenly cries in her apartment as her tears revive the seed. Big Destiny spots the Cosmic Owl in his dream, and is killed by his son, Peanut, upon waking up.
14	4	"The Cat Who Tipped the Box"	Cole Sanchez	Iggy Craig, Graham Falk, Jacob Winkler, & Jackie Files	November 13, 2025
A flashback shows young Huntress raised by a huntsman couple. Cake, invited for a cameo on Cheers, feels disrespected on set. As Prismo has trouble granting wishes to save Finn, Simon borrows the Ice Thing's Demonic Wishing Eye. Hunter sets up a meeting with the park department for Fionna's fundraiser, which Fionna forgets as being preoccupied by Huntress, who regrows and attempts to return to Ooo before passing out. Returning to her apartment, Fionna finds that she has been evicted and locked out.
15	5	"The Butterfly and the River"	Ryann Shannon	Anna Syvertsson, Kris Mukai, Maya Petersen, & Charmaine Verhagen	November 20, 2025
A flashback depicts Hana Abadeer has been a domineering mother, and young Marshall Lee's musicality was encouraged by Simone. Huntress and Cake finds a tree where they encounter some past and future worlds before finding the way out, while Gary takes Marshall Lee to meet his family. Queenie initially intends to level the lot, then she later demands a higher price from Fionna, who seeks help from Hana. Simon attempts to use the Demonic Wishing Eye to save Finn, but Finn looks worse.
16	6	"The Bird in the Clock"	Cole Sanchez	Iggy Craig, Graham Falk, Jacob Winkler, & Jackie Files	November 27, 2025
A flashback features the origin of the Cosmic Owl and his conjoined brother. Fionna gathers her friends in Abadeer's mausoleum, to prepare for the fundraiser, but Cake and Marshall Lee are worried. Marceline bites Finn to save him but is temporarily incapacitated by the poison instead. While sleeping, Huntress sees the Cosmic Owl head to Finn's croak dream; helped by Fionna and Farmworld Finn, she finds Finn's stage dream – a repeating cycle of being killed – and kills the Cosmic Owl to stop it from really happening.
17	7	"The Wolves Who Wandered"	Ryann Shannon	Hanna K. Nyström, Anna Syvertsson, Maya Petersen, & Charmaine Verhagen	December 4, 2025
Ellis P. refuses to listen to a message delivered in his dream. Fionna and Fennel search for the missing DJ Flame, and they have a hallucinatory trip to Venus to save him after eating some leaves Huntress gives for Wizard Eyes. Helped by Hunter, Huntress finds DJ Flame, who is actually playing a gig for Lemoncarb twins' dog, and she agrees to help Fionna with the fundraiser. Marshall Lee finds out what his mother did to Simone, and he tells Fionna that he does not want to host the fundraiser at the mausoleum.
18	8	"The Insect That Sang"	Cole Sanchez	Iggy Craig, Graham Falk, Sonja von Marensdorff, & Jackie Files	December 11, 2025
A flashback shows how the Heart of the Forest became entrapped by Green Wizards. Fionna and Huntress are tried by Orbo, who revives Scarab to testify, for the Cosmic Owl's death, which Fionna claims that Finn did. Cake hosts the fundraiser at the Lemoncarbs' place without the help from Hana, who offers to hire Fionna, who, after kissing DJ Flame and seen by Fennel, is jealous about the fundraiser working without her, wrecking the Sweet Spot. Finn suddenly disappears when Princess Bubblegum euthanizes the Heart of the Forest.
19	9	"The Worm and His Orchard"	Ryann Shannon	Maya Petersen, Rebecca Sugar, Anna Syvertsson, & Charmaine Verhagen	December 18, 2025
Huntress, Fionna and Cake fall through a portal to the Undergrowth, and the Karmic Worm finds Cake, while Fern meets Fionna and explains how painballs work there; upon hearing about the death of his brother, Cosmic Owl, the Karmic Worm breaks a painball to revive him, freeing Finn in Orbo's court, and Princess Bubblegum decides to call Minerva to save Finn. Fionna returns to her world, while Cake wants to stay longer; Huntress defeats Witch Wizard, but the portal to Ooo shatters before she can enter.
20	10	"The Bear and the Rose"	Cole Sanchez	Iggy Craig, Graham Falk, Sonja von Marensdorff, Jacob Winkler, & Jackie Files	December 25, 2025
A flashback depicts Minerva worried about Finn and never seeing Huntress. While Finn's consciousness is being uploaded, Huntress returns to Ooo, healing his wounds with multiversal seeds all together, and then Fionna telepathically wakes him up. Huntress lives with Finn and teaches people magic, while the Sweet Spot becomes a community center; Fionna reconciles with her friends and discovers a massive world beyond Peach Street. In a post-credits scene, Hunson Abadeer approaches Marshall Lee.

== Production ==
=== Background ===
Cake in the Scratch project of Cartoon Network

The idea for "Fionna the Human" and "Cake the Cat" evolved from drawings that Adventure Time character designer and storyboard revisionist Natasha Allegri had posted online during the show's earliest seasons. Reception to the gender-swapped characters was so positive that the Adventure Time producers decided to write the characters into the series; they debuted in Season 3's "Fionna and Cake", on which Allegri worked. The characters would make additional appearances in Season 5's "Bad Little Boy", Season 6's "The Prince Who Wanted Everything", Season 8's "Five Short Tables", and Season 9's "Fionna and Cake and Fionna."

=== Development ===
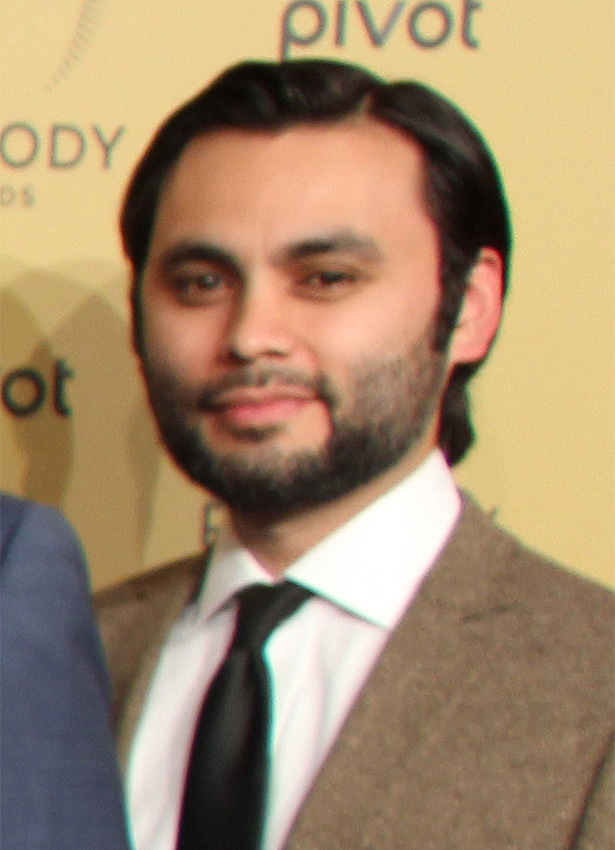
Adam Muto, executive producer of Adventure Time, Distant Lands, and Fionna and Cake

After the 2018 finale "Come Along with Me", a first spin-off series of Adventure Time: Distant Lands debuted in 2020; before the latter's finale in the next year, HBO Max announced that a gender-swapped spin-off series was in production. The Adventure Time: Fionna and Cake series was developed specifically with the young adult demographic in mind, according to Suzanna Makkos, an executive for both HBO Max and Adult Swim. In the United States, the limited series received a TV-14 certification based on the adult content (gore, profanity, and substance abuse), compared to Adventure Time's TV-PG rating. Longtime Adventure Time and Distant Lands executive producer Adam Muto returned as showrunner for the limited series, and produced it with Fred Seibert and Sam Register in partnership with Cartoon Network; former Adventure Time crewmembers Rebecca Sugar, Somvilay Xayaphone, and Patrick McHale, as well as Distant Lands composer Amanda Jones, returned to compose songs for the spin-off.

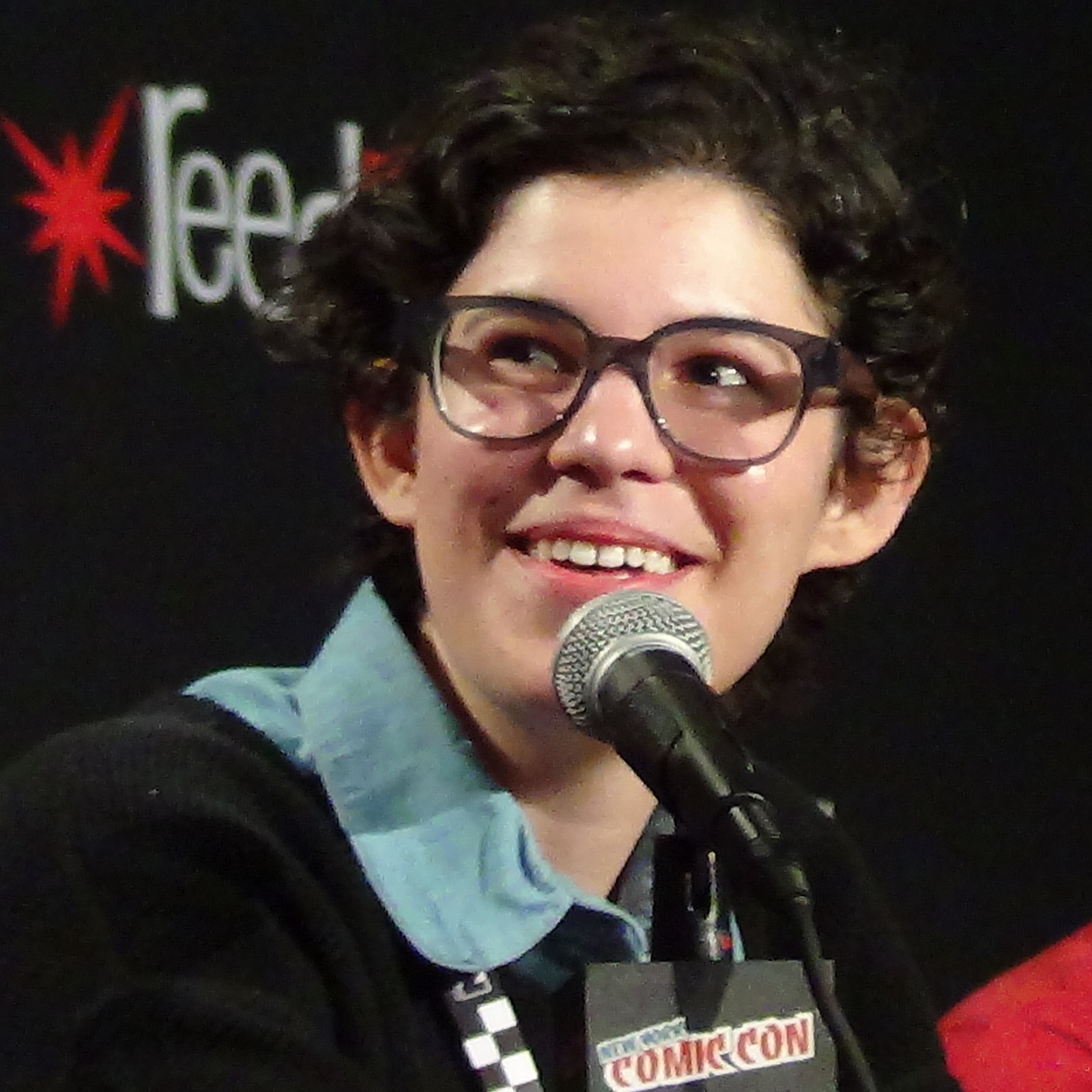
Rebecca Sugar returned to compose songs and write for Fionna and Cake

In interviews with The Direct and The Washington Post, Muto and Ryann Shannon explained that the crew decided to focus on Fionna and Cake due to their popularity with the Adventure Time fandom. Distant Lands is a limited series of four loosely connected vignettes, Fionna and Cake, on the other hand, is a more united story. While Finn is a selfless and energetic hero, Fionna is more ordinary, realistic, and without magic; while Jake is a lazy dog of magic powers, Cake lacks such powers and begins the series as a regular house cat. Previously, while both the voice actors Olivia Olson and Erica Luttrell are of African descent, and Marceline's mother was a person of color, Marceline and Marshall Lee share the look of gray vampire skin; in Fionna and Cake, Marshall Lee is with dark skin as a human character. As to Jake's uncertain death, Muto decided to leave it ambiguous.

=== Casting ===
The three main characters were voiced by the original cast of Adventure Time, namely Madeleine Martin as Fionna, Roz Ryan as Cake, and Tom Kenny as Simon Petrikov. In the original Adventure Time series, the character Prismo was voiced by Kumail Nanjiani. Due to a miscommunication from Nanjiani's representatives, the crew believed that he was not available and they recast the part during the first season with Sean Rohani, and Nanjiani later returned as Prismo again in season 2. In the original series, Justin Roiland voiced Earl of Lemongrab and he was replaced by Jinkx Monsoon, who later co-voiced with Cree Summer as the Lemoncarbs, the gender-swapped human version of Lemongrab as twin sisters.

Further recasts happened for season 2. Ashly Burch voices Huntress Wizard, in Adventure Time was previously voiced by Jenny Slate and Maria Bamford. As a fan and previously a writer of the show itself, Burch said that Huntress Wizard is important to her and she wanted to do her justice; Adam Muto did an open audition for the role, not knowing Burch auditioned until her audition was listed. In addition, Marshall Lee and Gary Prince, being voiced in the first season by Donald Glover and Andrew Rannells respectively, were also recast with Kris Kollins and Harvey Guillén. Asked about the cast changes, Muto mentioned the crew wanted to do different takes on established characters without making them sound like their previous voice actors. Muto also expressed difficulties with the recasting of characters, due to the unavailability of certain actors and the changes of modern streaming production. Frank Collison provided the voice for the Cosmic Owl in the series, following the death of M. Emmet Walsh in 2024. Walsh's death contributed to the decision to have the character temporarily killed off.

=== Animation ===
As with Adventure Time, Saerom Animation, Rough Draft Korea and later Digital eMation (as seen in credits in Season 2) worked on different episodes of the spin-off series. In an interview with Animation Magazine, Adam Muto revealed that for this spin-off, the writers had to plot out the season beforehand; this approach was required of them by HBO Max, and it contrasted with how the writers had approached storylines when working with Cartoon Network. Muto noted that the production was challenging because there was not much overlap in terms of color palette and backgrounds, as each episode is basically its own new world. For the sixth episode "The Winter King", the animation sequence of the song "Winter Wonder World" was directed by Alex and Lindsay Small-Butera (SmallBü), who previously guest animated two Adventure Time episodes, "Beyond the Grotto" and "Ketchup". Approximately 50 crew members from Cartoon Network Studios worked on the pre and post-production side; the production started in 2021, during the time of the COVID-19 pandemic. Most of the team was based in California, but some animators were as far away as Russia and Japan; during the height of the pandemic, about 90% of the work was done remotely until the studio reopened in 2022.

== Release ==
The first season of Adventure Time: Fionna and Cake debut on August 31, 2023; after the season finale, the series was renewed and the second season premiered on October 23, 2025.

Outside the United States, the series debuted on the same day in Australia on the streaming service Binge, and later by Fox8 on September 1. The series also premiered on Cartoon Network in Canada on September 15. On November 19, the series debut followed the release of HBO Max in Taiwan and Hong Kong; the series also released later in Macao on October 15, 2025. In South Korea, it was released on March 21, 2025 through the streaming service Coupang Play, along with other HBO Max original programs.

== Reception ==
=== Critical reception ===
Aryan Khanna noted that the series shifts into mature storylines while maintaining the original charm, comparing it with The Legend of Korra and some other series reboots for new generations; Khanna argued that this results in a fascinating combination of existential inquiry, appealing adventures, and whimsical comedy. Reuben Baron of Paste said that the series is "targeted specifically at a young adult audience", called it a show for "hardcore" fans, and compared the first two episodes to Bee and Puppycat and Steven Universe Future. Around September 2023, the first season of Fionna and Cake received a 100% approval rating on Rotten Tomatoes based on 10 reviews, and 78/100 on Metacritic based on 5 reviews.

Sabina Graves said that season two dances between both worlds, building out Finn’s B-plot on a collision with Fionna's world; she argued that, in a world of grabby capitalism, Fionna and Cake explores the importance of community roles and that cultivating community care is what makes the show's concept work. Julian Lytle concluded that the season is like a dramedy with themes of struggling adulthood and magical trips, acknowledging the strong voice acting.

=== LGBTQ+ representation ===
Marshall Lee (left) and Gary Prince (right) kiss, as seen in the end of "The Star", the seventh episode of the first season

Samantha Puc of Polygon and James Factora of Them both gave praise to the series for its queer representation—mainly through the romantic relationship between Marshall Lee and Gary Prince. Puc noted the intercutting between the relationships of Gary and Marshall Lee versus their gender-swapped counterparts Bubblegum and Marceline in "The Star", commenting that "they are always written as each other's romantic destinies". Factora contrasted Gary and Marshall's "unabashedly gay relationship" with "how contrivedly heterosexual" the early seasons of Adventure Time could be at times. Puc similarly contrasted Fionna and Cake's casual presentation of "queerness as a given in its parallel universes" with the earlier Adventure Time, which had to "[fight] hard for increased and visible queer inclusion".

Muto noted that, instead of him actively asking for it, the LGBTQ+ representation came out of the involved writers and artists themselves, who want their identities to be expressed and portrayed, and it became more overt in Steven Universe and some following shows. After the finale, about Gary and Marshall's romance as well as Bonnie and Marcy's rivalry, Susana Polo of Polygon argued that "a franchise once imprisoned by heteronormative censorship gave its fan-beloved queer couple multiversal staying power."

=== Accolades ===
Year	Award	Category	Nominee	Result	Ref.
2024	51st Annie Awards	Outstanding Achievement for Character Animation in an Animated Television / Broadcast Production	Alex Small-Butera (for "The Winter King")	Nominated	
2024	35th GLAAD Media Awards	Outstanding Kids and Family Programming - Animated	Adventure Time: Fionna and Cake	Nominated	
2024	76th Primetime Creative Arts Emmy Awards	Outstanding Individual Achievement in Animation	Alex Small-Butera (for "The Winter King")	Won	
2024	Women's Image Network Award	Best Animated Program	For "The Star"	Nominated	
2024	The ReFrame Stamp	2023-24 ReFrame Stamp	Adventure Time: Fionna and Cake	Won	
2026	37th GLAAD Media Award	Outstanding Kids and Family Programming - Animated	Adventure Time: Fionna and Cake	Won	
