= Natasha Allegri =

American animator and writer (born 1983)

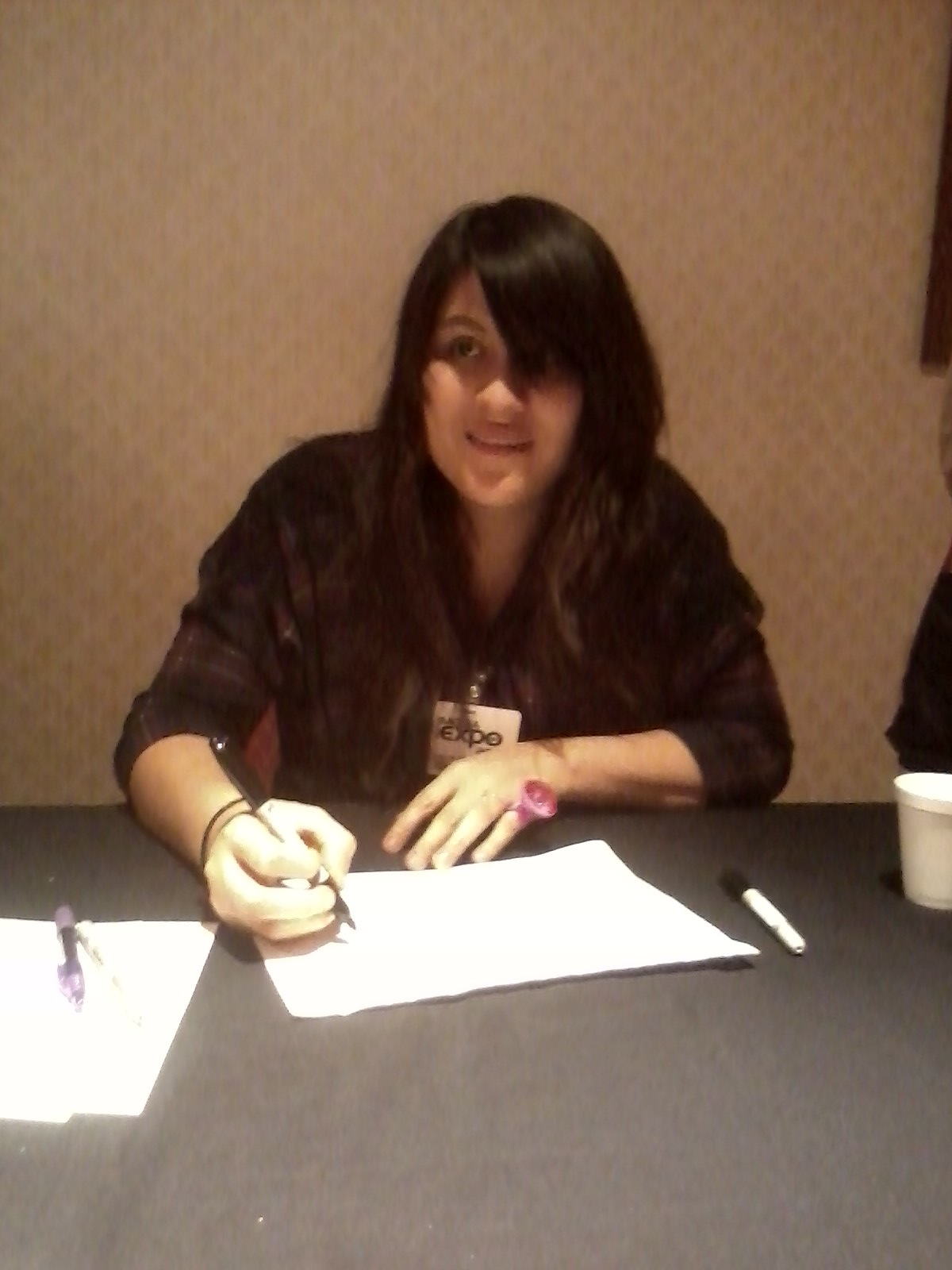
- Allegri at Midwest Media Expo, 2014
- Born: June 18, 1986 (age 40); Inverness, Florida, U.S.
- Education: University of Arizona
- Occupations: Animator, storyboard artist, comic book artist, storyboard revisionist, writer
- Writing career
- Period: 2010–present
- Genres: Adventure; Comedy drama Science fantasy Science fiction
- Notable works: Adventure Time; Bee and PuppyCat; Adventure Time: Fionna and Cake

Natasha Allegri (born June 18, 1986) is an American animator, writer, storyboard artist, storyboard revisionist and comic book artist. She is the creator of Cartoon Hangover's and Frederator Studios' Bee and PuppyCat, and is also noted for her work as a storyboard revisionist and character designer for Cartoon Network's Adventure Time, for which she created the characters Fionna and Cake, genderswapped versions of Finn and Jake.

== Early life ==
Born in June 1986, Allegri is the daughter of a Native Okinawan mother and a Bolivian father of French, Italian and Native Bolivian descent. She watched anime and read manga and the Garfield comic strip. As a result, she gravitated toward comics rather than cartoons, as she saw it as "less work", although she later acknowledged that it is "just as much work".

Allegri grew up in Inverness, Florida. In high school and college, she made comics about her life that she posted to LiveJournal, which is how she met Pendleton Ward.

== Adventure Time ==
While in college at the University of Arizona in Tucson, her friend, and creator of Adventure Time, Pendleton Ward, contacted her about working on Adventure Time and she worked on the show for five seasons. To begin working on the show, she moved to California, and dropped out of college over her father's objections. While working on the show, Allegri began drawing gender-swapped web comics of the show's characters, including "Fionna and Cake" as her gender-swapped versions of Finn and Jake. Eventually, after being showcased on Frederator's popular Adventure Time tumblr, these characters were featured in full episodes of Adventure Time—debuting in the episode "Fionna and Cake". Since August 6, 2013, she has also written and illustrated Fionna and Cake comics for BOOM! Studios. Allegri also posted art of "Fionna the Human" and "Cake the Cat" online during the show's earliest seasons, while working as a storyboard artist. It was later developed into a series entitled Adventure Time: Fionna and Cake.

== Bee and PuppyCat ==
Allegri created and produced her own animated short, Bee and PuppyCat, for Frederator Studios' YouTube channel Cartoon Hangover which was released on July 11, 2013. The episode introduces viewers to Bee, a recently unemployed slacker, and PuppyCat, a small and mysterious creature resembling both a dog and a cat. Bee takes PuppyCat in and, in return, he helps her find strange temp work, in this case babysitting a giant fish named Wallace in Fishbowl Space. In response to the success of the short, Frederator launched a Kickstarter on October 14, 2013, to raise funds for a full season. The Kickstarter was successful, raising Frederator $872,133 toward the production of Bee and PuppyCat, the animated series. This exceeded their original goal of $600,000 and made them the 10th most crowdfunded Video and Film project to date.

== Crowdfunding success ==
Natasha Allegri's successful campaign on Kickstarter has been seen as an example of digital-age crowdfunding mechanisms' role on enabling creators reliant on direct fan investment. It was described by some as the "most successful Kickstarter campaign" for an animated series at the time, as she was able to crowdfund nine episodes of the series. Allegri later said that "a studio wouldn't have aired Bee and PuppyCat" and that it could only exist online. Other stated that the crowdfunding was successful because of the "devoted...fanbase" of Adventure Time.

== Comic books ==
Allegri has created multiple graphic novels/comic books starring "Fionna and Cake" and "Bee and PuppyCat", respectively.

Bee and Puppycat:

- Bee and Puppycat #1, created with Garrett Jackson.
- Bee and Puppycat #2, created with Garrett Jackson.
- Bee and Puppycat #3, created with Madeleine Flores, Ian McGinty, Anissa Espinosa, and Tait Howard.
- Bee and Puppycat #4, created with T. Zysk, Mad Rupert, Coleman Engle, Aimee Fleck, Pranas Naujokaitis, and Anissa Espinosa.
- Bee and Puppycat, Vol. 1 (#1-4), created with the aforementioned.
- Bee and Puppycat #5, created with T. Zysk, Chrystin Garland, Flynn Nicholls, and Meredith McClaren.
- Bee and Puppycat #6, created with Andrew Lorenzi, Joy Ang, Meredith McClaren, and Carey Pietsch.
- Bee and Puppycat #7, created with Garrett Jackson.
- Bee and Puppycat #8, created with David Calderón, Liz Fleming, Coleman Engle, Reimena Yee, and T. Zysk.
- Bee and Puppycat, Vol. 2 (#5-8), created with the aforementioned.
- Bee and Puppycat #9, created (without the help of Natasha Allegri) by Patrick Seery, and Ji in Kim.

Adventure Time with Fionna & Cake:

- Adventure Time with Fionna & Cake #1, created with ND Stevenson.
- Adventure Time with Fionna & Cake #2, created with Lucy Knisley.
- Adventure Time with Fionna & Cake #3, created by Natasha Allegri.
- Adventure Time with Fionna & Cake #4, created by Natasha Allegri.
- Adventure Time with Fionna & Cake #5, created with Lucy Knisley.
- Adventure Time with Fionna & Cake #6, created with Betty Liang.
- Adventure Time with Fionna & Cake, Vol. 1, created with Lucy Knisley, and Kate Leth.

== Influences ==
Allegri has named several of her influences including Naoko Takeuchi's Sailor Moon, works by Rumiko Takahashi like InuYasha, and Superbook, as well as Loren Bouchard's Bob's Burgers, Mike Judge's King of the Hill, Hayao Miyazaki's Kiki's Delivery Service, and her cat, Pancake.

== Other work ==
Allegri sang the theme song for the "Fionna and Cake" episode of Adventure Time. Additionally, she served as a storyboard revisionist for the Bravest Warriors episode "Butter Lettuce" and has contributed to the miniseries Over the Garden Wall as writer and storyboard artist.

She also provided the official art for the Vocaloid soundbank Ruby, released by PowerFX. This art was based upon a concept design by illustrator D-Artemisso.

In 2017, Allegri directed "The Summoning," created by Elyse Castro, for Frederator's Cartoon Hangover channel. It was the first short cartoon from GO! Cartoons.

In 2019, Allegri was co-author of the OpenBSD 6.5 poster and was the author of the OpenBSD 6.6 and 7.0 posters. She was a writer for the anime series Cannon Busters the same year.
