= The Condor (film) =

2007 film by Steven E. Gordon

- DVD cover
- Directed by: Steven E. Gordon
- Written by: Marv Wolfman
- Story by: Stan Lee
- Produced by: Stan Lee; Rocky Solotoff
- Starring: Wilmer Valderrama; María Conchita Alonso; Kathleen Barr; Michael Dobson; Mary Elizabeth McGlynn; Cusse Mankuma
- Cinematography: Larry Brown
- Edited by: Shawn Logue
- Production companies: POW! Entertainment; Film Roman; Manga Entertainment
- Distributed by: Anchor Bay Entertainment
- Release date: March 20, 2007
- Running time: 74 minutes
- Country: United States
- Language: English

The Condor is a 2007 American animated superhero film based on a character created by Stan Lee. It features the voices of Wilmer Valderrama, María Conchita Alonso, Kathleen Barr, Michael Dobson, Mary Elizabeth McGlynn, and Cusse Mankuma.

The film was released under the Stan Lee Presents banner. The Condor is based on a story line developed by Stan Lee and the script was written by Marv Wolfman. The film was released on DVD on March 20, 2007, followed by a screening on Cartoon Network's Toonami block that same month.

== Plot ==
In San Diego, California, a mysterious criminal called Taipan uses a mind controlling, performance enhancement device to manipulate an old man into robbing a store, only for it to cause the latter to die from a heart attack. The next morning, college dropout and professional skater Tony Valdez saves his cousin Reuben from a gang before entering a skating competition with help from Sammi, an old friend of the family's. After winning the first round, Tony encounters a woman named Valeria, and they flirt with each other. While meeting with his parents, his mother gives him a condor amulet. Later that night, Tony is led to believe his parents are criminals when he overhears them discussing an error in their research with their business partner, Nigel Harrington. His parents attempt to explain themselves the next day, but Tony storms off. During the competition's second round, a mysterious man sabotages his board, causing him to lose. Tony's parents try to go to the police, only to be suddenly ambushed by mind-controlled skaters who cause them to crash. Tony hears of the accident and finds his parents dead before being ambushed and paralyzed by the same skaters.

While in recovery, Tony is sent to therapy under former surfer Dogg. Meanwhile, Sammi starts going out with Tony's rival Z-Man and gives Tony enhanced boots. Using them, Tony creates a superhero identity he later calls the Condor. Meanwhile, it has since been revealed that Taipan is working for Nigel, and while on a date with Valeria, Tony is lured into a trap set up by Taipan. During the fight, Tony discovers Taipan caused his parents' death for trying to report their research error. Severely wounded, Tony manages to escape and goes to Sammi for help, apologizing for his behavior and realizing his feelings for her. However, Reuben interrupts, revealing he sabotaged Tony's board because he was ungrateful. Tony gets a call from Valeria, so he leaves to check on her while Sammi discovers the error in question. Upon reaching Valeria's house, Tony learns she is Taipan and gets into a fight with her. Valeria leaves him for dead and attempts to use a selfish Reuben to kill Sammi.

Surviving the attack, Tony receives help from Z-Man and befriends him as they save Sammi and Dogg from a fire Reuben and Valeria started. Elsewhere, Nigel holds an auction, only to be betrayed and murdered by Valeria, who takes control. However, Tony arrives and foils her plans. Amidst their ensuing fight, the building is set ablaze, trapping Valeria. Tony tries to save her, but she attempts to kill him, falling into the fire.

Sometime later, Tony has entered a relationship with Sammi and entered a new competition with Z-Man. Unbeknownst to them, a mysterious clan retrieves Valeria's body and her mind control device so they can use it for their own plans.

== Cast ==
- Wilmer Valderrama as Tony Valdez/The Condor
- María Conchita Alonso as Maria Valdez
- Kathleen Barr as Sammi
- Mary Elizabeth McGlynn as Valeria/Taipan
- Michael Dobson as Nigel Harrington
- Scott McNeil as Dogg
- Cusse Mankuma as Z-Man
- Sam Vincent as Reuben
- Alessandro Juliani as Chato
- John Novak as George Valdez
- Matt Hill as Skragg
- France Perras as Fragg
- Stan Lee as Grandfather

== Development ==
Originally titled El Lobo, The Condor was released under the Stan Lee Presents banner, a series of direct-to-DVD animated films distributed by POW Entertainment with Anchor Bay Entertainment. The story was by Stan Lee, with the script written by former The New Teen Titans writer Marv Wolfman. The film was directed by Steven E. Gordon.

The film is set in the same world as Mosaic, a prior Stan Lee Presents film, with the film's events apparently occurring before the events of Mosaic. The film does not fall within the Marvel universe.

== Release ==
The Condor was released on DVD on March 20, 2007, and had its television premiere on Cartoon Network on March 24, 2007.

== Reception ==
Per Frederick Luis Aldama, the film received a poor critical reception upon its release. Aldama himself has praised the creative decisions of Lee and Wolfman in relation to its depiction of Latino women and credits it as the "first such animated feature-length narrative to focus on a Latino superhero". Felix Vasquez Jr of Cinema Crazed criticized the villain's plans as too convoluted while also criticizing the character of Tony Valdez as selfish and obnoxious, as well as stating that Valderrama's voice acting was "awfully anemic, almost as if he's just as bored as we are." Todd Douglass Jr of DVD Talk also criticized Tony as an unlikeable character and that his abilities as a superhero were "actually pretty lame" as "Tony skates around and punches people without finesse."

On review aggregator website Rotten Tomatoes, the film has been negatively reviewed by three critics.
