= POW! Entertainment =

American media production company

POW! Entertainment, Inc.
- Type: Subsidiary
- Industry: Entertainment
- Founded: 2001; 25 years ago
- Founder: Stan Lee; Gill Champion; Arthur Lieberman
- Headquarters: Beverly Hills, California, United States
- Key people: Gill Champion (president)
- Services: Development
- Revenue: ▼$ 20.21 million (FY 2015)
- Operating income: ▼$ -200,415 (FY 2015)
- Net income: ▼$ -187,367 (FY 2015)
- Total assets: ▼$ 803,679 (FY 2015)
- Total equity: ▼$ -4.99 million (FY 2015)
- Number of employees: 13 (March 2014)
- Parent: Camsing International Holding
- Divisions: Stan Lee Universe LP
- Subsidiaries: Stan Lee Global Entertainment, LLC
- Website: powentertainment.com

POW! Entertainment Inc. is an American media production company formed in 2001 by Gill Champion, Arthur Lieberman and former Marvel Comics writer, editor and publisher Stan Lee. POW! is made up of two companies: POW! Entertainment, Inc. (POW! Inc.), a holding corporation, and its wholly owned subsidiary, POW! Entertainment, LLC (POW! LLC) and is currently owned by Camsing International Holding.

POW! productions include the 2006 Sci-Fi Channel's TV-movie Stan Lee's Lightspeed, that network's reality television series Who Wants to Be a Superhero? and the Stan Lee's Mighty 7 media franchise. Other productions include the direct-to-DVD animated features Stan Lee's Mosaic and Stan Lee Presents: The Condor.

== History ==
In November 2001, Stan Lee formed POW! Entertainment, LLC, a Delaware-registered limited liability company, with Gill Champion and Arthur Lieberman. POW! set up their offices at Metro-Goldwyn-Mayer's headquarters in Santa Monica, California as a first look deal was negotiated in April 2002 by Lieberman with MGM and Cheyenne Enterprises, Bruce Willis's and producer Arnold Rifkin's production company.

Lee created the risqué animated superhero series Stripperella for Spike TV's The Strip animated block which premiered on June 26, 2003. POW! also had a dozen additional feature and television production agreements by July. Three of the films were in preproduction: Nightbird, The Femizons then with writers Cary Solomon and Chuck Konzelman and The Double Man, then under development by Training Day director Antoine Fuqua. A production agreement was signed by POW! and Idiom Films for Forever Man, an avenging hero type with a twist. Meanwhile, the company signed with DIC Entertainment on a TV series production deal starting with Stan Lee's Secret Super Six, about teens with alien superpowers who are taught by Lee about humanity. The in-development Hefs Superbunnies animated superhero series was announced by Lee at Comic-Con 2003, which would feature a villain fighting Hugh Hefner and his playmates.

=== Public corporation ===
The separate corporation, POW! Entertainment, Inc., is a holding company created to have publicly traded stock. The corporation originated as Delaware-based Megatek Legacy Systems, Inc., formed August 17, 1998; it became Alta Pacific Minerals, Inc. in 1999, and Arturion Entertainment, Inc. in 2002. By 2004, Arturion's stockholder was Media Dynamics, Inc., owned by Valerie Barth, controlling stockholder, and minority stockholder, UltraVision Inc., owned by Ron Sandman. Arturion was a public shell corporation used to acquire POW! on May 5, 2004, with POW! members receiving Arturion shares to take it public on over-the-counter market "Pink Sheets" in a reverse merger. Arturion changed its name to POW! Entertainment, Inc. Media Dynamics invested $500,000 for 769,250 shares with a subscription for additional shares for $650,000.

In August 2004, Lee announced a superhero program that would feature Ringo Starr, the former Beatle, as the lead character. Additionally, in August of that year, Lee announced the launch of Stan Lee's Sunday Comics.

In May 2004, IDT Entertainment purchased a minority share in POW! Entertainment in an agreement for exclusive distribution rights to POW!'s animated DVD properties and a joint development of six cartoon films. In 2005, the company announced that another animated film that would feature the voice of Ringo Starr. Also in early 2005, the company formed a strategic partnership to develop a new mobile channel with mobile-streaming pioneer Vidiator, through Vidiator's mobile streaming technology. In 2006, this resulted in an agreement with Sprint Nextel Corp. where the Stan Lee's POW! Mobile Channel is officially listed as Sprint's Channel 70. The channel includes mobisodes with Stripperella, The Accuser and The Drifter.

In 2004, an agreement with Andrew Stevens Entertainment Group and Jeff Franklin of FWE Inc. indicated that POW! and Lee planned to produce three action movies for the Sci Fi Channel, which were to be aired in 2005 to 2006. Only one movie, Lightspeed, was completed for Sci Fi and aired July 26, 2006.

In December 2004, in a joint venture agreement with Celebrities In Action, a company formed by investment banker Stan Medley (who structured POW! Entertainment's reverse merger earlier in the year and Chris Nassif, President of Diverse Media Group, Lee was to create approximately 25 characters based on celebrities. POW! and CIA were scheduled to commence production in early spring of 2005. In February 2005, POW! Announced a second project with Celebrities In Action called The Fantasy Zone. The new franchise was to introduce a parallel universe where celebrities can go to live out their own fantasies and dreams.

POW!'s president and CEO, Gill Champion said in 2005 that Lee was creating a new superhero film, Foreverman, for Paramount Pictures in tandem with producer Robert Evans and Idiom Films, with Peter Briggs hired to collaborate with Lee on the screenplay. In 2005, Lee and Michelle Rodriguez agreed to develop a Tigress film, based on the Conan the Barbarian comic book villainess.

In 2007, POW! started a series of direct-to-DVD animated films under the Stan Lee Presents banner. The two releases were Mosaic and The Condor.

POW! and Walt Disney Studios agreed to a first-look deal in June 2007. The following year, the first three titles under that deal were announced: Nick Ratchet, Blaze and Tigress, an original concept from the Conan villainess.

On June 9, 2007, a suit was brought against Lee, POW!, subsidiary QED Entertainment, and the former Stan Lee Media staff at POW!. On January 20, 2009, Judge Stephen Wilson, in Los Angeles Federal Court, ruled that Stan Lee Media had illegally transferred their assets, including the Drifter and the Accuser, to POW! in violation of a bankruptcy court order.

In April 2008, Brighton Partners and Rainmaker Animation announced a partnership with POW! to produce a CGI film series, Legion of 5. That same month, Virgin Comics announced Lee would create a line of superhero comics for that company.

On December 31, 2009, The Walt Disney Company's Catalyst Investments acquired a 10% stake in POW! for $2.5 million, coinciding with its full acquisition of Marvel Entertainment. Also, Disney's Silver Creek Pictures entered into another agreement with POW! for first-look and consulting services.

In 2010, POW! started reporting to OTC Markets Group and was moved to the Over-The-Counter QB (OTCQB) tier market from the pink sheets. In February of that year, POW! partnered with A Squared Entertainment (A2) and Archie Comics to create the Stan Lee Comics print and digital line starting with the Super Seven. On August 5, the reality-television series Stan Lee's Superhumans show premiered on the cable channel History. Also that month, Super7, a toy manufacturer, sued POW! and partners over Stan Lee Comics' Super Seven. Late in the year, POW! and Boom! Studios began publishing three new comic-book series: Soldier Zero, Starborn, and The Traveler. In October, Guardian Media Entertainment, a partnership of Lee, SLG Entertainment and NHL Enterprises, created hockey-themed superheroes called "Guardians" for each of the 30 teams in the National Hockey League. The venture includes a graphic novel.

Ricco Capital and Panda Media Partners, a joint venture of POW! and Fidelis Entertainment, formed a partnership, Magic Storm Entertainment, in June 2011 to produce material for Asia. In 2011, Lee was writing a live-action musical, The Yin and Yang Battle of Tao. In October, Lee announced he would partner with 1821 Comics on a multimedia imprint for children, Stan Lee's Kids Universe, a move that addressed the lack of comic books targeted for children. He also said he was collaborating with the company on its futuristic graphic novel Romeo & Juliet: The War, by writer Max Work and artist Skan Srisuwan. In November, POW! signed an agreement with YouTube and Vuguru, Michael Eisner's digital studio, to start a YouTube channel called Stan Lee's World of Heroes. That same month, the company signed a deal with EQAL to create and launch theRealStanLee.com, an official site for Lee.

In May 2012, Arthur Lieberman, Chief Operating Officer and Chief Counsel of POW!, died due to lung cancer. Also in May, POW! filed suit against Valerie Barth of Media Dynamics and Ron Sandman, sole director of UltraVision Inc., for fraud and breach of contract, claiming it is owed $1.15 million for a three-million common stock subscription. Barth, Sandman and their corporations countersued.

In March 2013, Hub Network picked up its first work from POW!, "Stan Lee's Mighty 7", an animated pilot movie to be aired in early 2014.

On April 5, 2013, a joint venture that POW! owns with MKC Entertainment, SL Power Concerts, launched its military friendly Stan Lee's POW!er Concert series with country band Gloriana at the Pacific View Events Center, Camp Pendleton, along with future concerts at other military bases, and proceeds going to military affiliated charities. On June 12, POW! and JADS International released the Stan Lee Signature Cologne. Legion of 5 was revealed in June to be a live action film at Sandman Studios-affiliated live action label Paralight Films in the casting stage. Arad Productions and POW! are in early development on a new superhero movie set up at Columbia Pictures as of November 2013, which is revealed in August 2014 as Apollo Rising, as it was melded with Red Queen author Victoria Aveyard's script Eternals.

POW! formed Stan Lee Global Entertainment as a joint venture in 2014 with the Hong Kong–based investment firm, Ricco Media Investments Limited. Ricco Media was purchased by Focus Media Network Limited on August 20, 2015. POW! also announced two Chinese projects in October 2015: Realm, a superheroine movie and the first film from Stan Lee Global Entertainment, and Arch Alien, a sci-fi movie.

Disney's second and final project under the first look deal with POW! was The Zodiac Legacy book series, with the first book to be released through Disney Publishing Worldwide in January 2015. However, the first look deal agreed to in 2006 and extended in 2009 was allowed to expire as of December 31, 2014.

In January 2015, Digital Domain announced a joint venture company 25% owned by POW! for development, production and international distribution of projects from either owner. Also part of the deal was the creation of a virtual Stan Lee.

Stan Lee's Lucky Man was picked up in March 2015 by Sky1 to be adapted into a one-hour, 10-episode show, as a POW! co-production with Carnival Films and his first UK drama series. A second season was ordered in March 2016, as it was Sky1's highest-rated original drama program ever.

=== Camsing subsidiary ===
In May 2017, POW! was acquired by Camsing International Holding. Camsing USA vice president Shane Duffy was named CEO while Gill Champion retained the president role. In July 2018, Linking Star Picture was formed as a joint venture of Beijing Film, Beijing Novo United Films, and Hong Kong–based Camsing International. Linking Star would develop five projects from POW! and Chinese superhero movies, with Bob Sabouni, a former vice president of Marvel, consulting for Linking Star.

In May 2018, Lee filed a $1 billion lawsuit with the Los Angeles Superior Court against POW! Entertainment for "stealing" the rights to his name and likeness, among other complaints. The lawsuit named CEO Shane Duffy, as well as the other co-founder of the company, Gill Champion, stating that both parties "conspired and agreed to broker a sham deal to sell POW! to a company in China and fraudulently steal Stan Lee's identity, name, image, and likeness as part of a nefarious scheme to benefit financially at Lee's expense." In addition, the lawsuit claimed that the defendants had obtained Lee's signature illegally in order to obtain "the exclusive right to use Lee's name, identity, image and likeness on a worldwide basis in perpetuity", against the wishes of Lee, among several other complaints detailed in the suit. In July 2018, Lee dropped the lawsuit against POW!, four months before he died on November 12, 2018. Camsing stated that they would continue to develop Lee's IP in POW! despite his death.

In July 2019, Camsing announced that Ching "Vivian" Lo, company founder and chairwoman, has been held by the Shanghai Public Security Bureau. POW! management indicated in a July 10 statement that the company is considered an autonomous subsidiary of Camsing, thus is not affected. J.C. Lee, Stan's daughter, announced on August 3 that the Stan Lee Estate would move to distance itself from Camsing International and that the estate held the position that POW! and Camsing do not have "rights to Stan Lee's name, likeness or legacy" given the illegal activities alleged during the purchase of POW! from Stan Lee.

On July 6, 2020, Genius Brands set up a JV with POW to hold the exclusive worldwide rights to use Lee's name, physical likeness and signature from POW! as well as licensing rights to his name and over 100 of POW!'s original IPs. The assets were to be placed under a new joint-venture with POW!, called Stan Lee Universe, managed by Genius. Michael E. Uslan was hired to advise Genius on Lee Universe Film and TV projects. Genius then arranged a publishing deal with Archie Comics for the Stan Lee Universe comic book imprint, starting with the Kindergarten Cop adaptation title.

In Aug 2023, Gill Champion resigned from POW! Entertainment.

== Production ==
Title	Year(s)	Type	Production partner(s)	Distributor	Notes
Stripperella	2003–2004	Animated series		Spike TV	
Stan Lee’s Superhero Christmas	October 2004	Book	HarperCollins		
Stan Lee’s Superhero Christmas	4th Qtr. 2005	Direct-to-video			
Lightspeed	2006	Television film	FWE Picture Company	Sci Fi Channel (TV); Nu Image Films	
Who Wants to Be a Superhero?	2006–2007	Reality television series	Nash Entertainment	Sci Fi Channel	2 seasons
Mosaic	2007	Direct-to-video	Manga Entertainment (presents); Film Roman; Voicebox Productions	Anchor Bay Entertainment	Released under "Stan Lee Presents" label
The Condor	2007	Direct-to-video	Manga Entertainment (presents); Film Roman; Voicebox Productions	Anchor Bay Entertainment	Released under "Stan Lee Presents" label
Ultimo	2008	Manga	Shueisha; Viz Media		
Who Wants to Be a Superhero? (UK)	2009	Reality television series		BBC Two/CBBC	1 season
Time Jumper	2009	Animated mobile series	Walt Disney Studios Home Entertainment	iTunes	
"Heroman"	2009–2012	Manga	Square Enix's Shonen Gangan		
"Heroman"	2010	Anime television series	Bones; Wowmax Media	TX Network	
Stan Lee's line	2010	Comic books	Boom! Studios		Titles: Soldier Zero; Starborn; The Traveler
Stan Lee's Superhumans	2010 –2013	Reality television series		The History Channel	3 seasons 31 episodes
Chakra: The Invincible		Digital comics series	Liquid Comics	Graphic India	
Chakra: The Invincible	November 30, 2013	Animated film	Graphic India	Cartoon Network India	Also on ToonTV
Stan Lee's Verticus	September 2012	iOS game	Controlled Chaos Media	Moonshark	
Stan Lee Superhero Pack	November 2014	Software add-on	Plotagon		Plotagon film software expansion with five characters, 4 new superheroes and a bonus Stan Lee
The Zodiac Legacy	January 27, 2015	Book series	Disney Publishing Worldwide		2 illustrated novels so far: Convergence; The Dragon's Return
The Zodiac Legacy	March 30, 2016	Graphic novels	Papercutz		Tiger Island
Stan Lee's Hero Command	March 19, 2015	expandable mobile game	F84 Games		
"The Unknowns"	2015	Comic book	Arcana Studios		
Lucky Man	2016 — 2018	UK drama series	Carnival Films	Sky1 (UK); NBCUniversal International Distribution	3 seasons, 28 episodes
Stan Lee's Cosmic Crusaders	2016	Webseries	Genius Brands	The Hollywood Reporter	
God Woke	2016	Comic : digital, print, cinematic graphic novel (CGN)	LNL Partners: Shatner Singularity imprint	comiXology (digital); Diamond (HC print); Panelfly CGN via iTunes, Amazon, Google and Vimeo	
Work Force	July 17, 2017	online comic			twice per week
The Reflection	July 22, 2017	Anime TV series	Studio DEEN	NHK	12 episodes
Stan Tones	2017	ring tones		Google Play apps store	40 unique rings
Alliances: A Trick of Light	June 27, 2019	audio drama	Audible; Origin Story Entertainment	Audible	
The B-Team	2020	Television show – Korean	Studio Invictus; Camsing International; Stan Lee Global Entertainment; JYP Pictures	TBA	Kang Eun-kyung's Plot Line providing scripts
The B-Team	TBA	Television show – Chinese	Studio Invictus; Camsing International; Stan Lee Global Entertainment; JYP Pictures	TBA	Kang Eun-kyung's Plot Line providing scripts
Superhero Kindergarten	April 23 - October 22, 2021	Animated TV show	Genius Brands; Oak Productions; Youku	Youku; Kartoon Channel!	Arnold Schwarzenegger as Arnold Armstrong/Captain Courage & co-executive producer; Stan Lee as creator; Fabian Nicieza as writer; Paul Wachter, CEO of Main Street Advisors, as executive producer; 26 episode series

=== Upcoming ===
Title	Release	Type	Production partner(s)	Distributor	Notes
Legion of 5	TBA	Animated film	Paralight Films; Rainmaker Entertainment		casting
Apollo Rising	TBA	Movie	Arad Productions	Columbia Pictures	early development
Realm	TBA	Movie	Fundamental Films; Stan Lee Global Entertainment	Fundamental Films	Chinese Super heroine, cast (star: Li Bingbing) & scripted (Alex Litvak)
Arch Alien	TBA	Movie	Hualien Media; Mission Control Entertainment		
Stan Lee Universe imprint	TBA	comics	Archie Comics		Superhero Kindergarten, first title

== Units ==
- QED Productions, LLC – holds the intellectual property from the defunct Stan Lee Media
- PFD, LLC
- Pharmelle, Inc., inactive
- POW! Entertainment, LLC
  - Panda Media Partners – a joint venture with Fidelis Entertainment
    - Magic Storm Entertainment – a partnership with Ricco Capital for the Asian markets
  - SLG Entertainment, LLC (SLGE) owned with NHL Enterprises (NHLE), LP
    - Guardian Media Entertainment, LLC (GME) – The Guardian Project with NBCUniversal
  - Stan Lee Universe – a joint venture with Genius Brands to manage Lee's likeness and IP
  - Stan Lee's Kids Universe – a joint venture with 1821 Comics for a multimedia imprint for children
  - Stan Lee's World of Heroes – a YouTube channel joint venture with YouTube and Vuguru
  - SL Power Concerts, LLC (2012–2013) – a joint venture with MKC Entertainment for Stan Lee's POW!er Concerts
- Unnamed 25%/75% joint venture with Digital Domains
- Stan Lee Global Entertainment, LLC – joint venture (2014–) with a Hong Kong–based investor, Ricco Media Investments Limited (75%), a subsidiary of Focus Media Network Limited
