= Magic Storm Entertainment =

- Company type: Partnership
- Industry: Entertainment
- Founded: June 2011
- Founder: Stan Lee; Ricco Capital; Panda Media Partners
- Headquarters: Los Angeles, CA
- Key people: Stan Lee, Chairman Emeritus; Eric Mika, CEO
- Services: Development
- Owner: Ricco Capital; Panda Media Partners (POW! & Fidelis Entertainment)
- Website: MagicStormEntertainment.com

Magic Storm Entertainment is an entertainment company to develop material for the Asia markets. Magic Storm partners are Ricco Capital and Panda Media Partners, a joint venture of POW! and Fidelis Entertainment.

== History ==
Magic Storm Entertainment was formed as a partnership by Ricco Capital and Panda Media Partners, a joint venture of POW! Entertainment and Fidelis Entertainment, in June 2011 to produce material for Asia. In December, Magic Storm announced screenwriter Dan Gilroy has sign on to write "The Annihilator" (working title) based on a treatment acquired from POW!

In June 2012, Chinese state-run National Film Capital, an entertainment industry fund management company, announced its initial feature film co-production slate with Magic Storm's "The Annihilator" at the top of the list.

== Production library ==
Title	Year(s)	Type	Production partner(s)	Distributor	notes
"The Annihilator" (working title)	TBA	Film	National Film Capital		Dan Gilroy, writer Barry Josephson, producer
