= Lightspeed (film) =

2006 television film

- Genre: Action; Science fiction
- Written by: John Gray; Steve Latshaw
- Directed by: Don E. FauntLeRoy
- Starring: Jason Connery; Nicole Eggert; Daniel Goddard; Lee Majors; Socorro Herrera
- Theme music composer: Peter Meisner
- Country of origin: United States
- Original language: English

Production
- Producer: Paul D. Goldman
- Editor: Ken Peters
- Running time: 90 minutes
- Production company: FWE Picture Company

Original release
- Network: Sci-Fi Channel
- Release: June 26, 2006

Lightspeed, (also known as Stan Lee's Lightspeed) is a 2006 American superhero film directed by Don E. FauntLeRoy, starring Jason Connery in the title role. It also stars Nicole Eggert, Daniel Goddard, and Lee Majors. It was released direct-to-video on January 9, 2007.

== Plot ==
The covert world of government Ghost Squad agent Daniel Leight (Jason Connery) comes crashing down when he gets critically injured in a building collapse triggered by the genetically mutated terrorist called Python (Daniel Goddard). When Leight's radiation treatments are later sabotaged by Python, Leight discovers that he has the ability to move at hyper speeds, though only by risking potentially fatal metabolic damage.

== Cast ==
- Jason Connery as Daniel Leight / Lightspeed
- Nicole Eggert as Beth Baker
- Daniel Goddard as Python / Edward Bartlett
- Lee Majors as Tanner
- Michael Flynn as Dr. Findlay
- K.C. Clyde as Tom Barcroft
- Scott Hanks as Brian Latham
- Kari Hawker as Young Nurse
- Joyce Cohen as Old Nurse
- James Jamison as Senator Paul Davis
- Charles Halford as General Haade
- Socorro Herrera as Com-Tech

== Production ==
In December 2004, it was reported that Stan Lee's POW! Entertainment was developing Lightspeed as part of a three-picture deal for the Sci-Fi Channel. Steve Latshaw was hired to write the screenplay having previous written Sci-Fi Channel's Curse of the Komodo.

== Broadcast ==
Lightspeed premiered on the Sci-Fi Channel on July 26, 2006.
