= The Guardian Project =

The Guardian Project may refer to:

- The Guardian Project (comics), fictional superhero squad created by Stan Lee
- Guardian Project (software), open-source software development initiative

== See also ==
- Project Guardian
