= Superhero Kindergarten =

2021 superhero television series

- Official poster
- Genre: Action; Adventure; Comedy; Fantasy; Superhero
- Created by: Stan Lee; Arnold Schwarzenegger; Andy Heyward
- Based on: Superhero Kindergarten by Stan Lee
- Developed by: Fabian Nicieza
- Directed by: John Landis
- Voices of: Arnold Schwarzenegger; Desiree Burch; Shelley Longworth; Penelope Rawlins; Rae Lim; Nneka Okoye; Jules de Jongh; Shash Hira; Dan Russell; Adam Diggle
- Composer: Paul Westerberg
- Countries of origin: United States; Ireland
- Original language: English
- No. of seasons: 1
- No. of episodes: 26

Production
- Executive producers: Fabian Nicieza; Arnold Schwarzenegger; Paul Wachter; John Landis
- Running time: 24–25 minutes
- Production companies: Genius Brands; POW! Entertainment; Oak Productions; Telegael

Original release
- Network: Kartoon Channel
- Release: April 23 – October 22, 2021

Superhero Kindergarten (also known as Stan Lee's Superhero Kindergarten) is a superhero television series starring Arnold Schwarzenegger and Desiree Burch. The series was created by Stan Lee, Schwarzenegger and Andy Heyward, and co-produced by Genius Brands, POW! Entertainment, Oak Productions and Telegael Teoranta. Superhero Kindergarten premiered on April 23, 2021, on Genius Brands' streaming service Kartoon Channel. The first season finale aired on October 22, 2021. No further seasons were ever announced; however, the series was set to consist of 52 episodes, but only 26 episodes have aired as of October 22, 2021.

== Premise ==
A former gym teacher turned superhero, Captain Fantastic, lost his superpowers in a battle with his nemesis, Dr. Superior. During this air battle, his superpower particles were transferred to six babies who were below. Five years later, the powerless Captain Fantastic, now known as Mr. Arnold, is called on to work "undercover" as a kindergarten teacher to raise a new generation of super-powered kids.

== Characters ==
Main

- Arnold Armstrong / Captain Fantastic (voiced by Arnold Schwarzenegger)
- Principal Shoutzalot (voiced by Desiree Burch)
- Billy / Blocker (voiced by Shelley Longworth)
- Lin / Cray Cray (voiced by Rae Lin)
- Patty / Patty Putty (voiced by Nneka Okoye)
- Pedro / Power Pedro (voiced by Jules de Jongh)
- Vik / Sticky (voiced by Shash Hira)
- Nigel Danforth / Dr. Superior (voiced by Dan Russell)
- Mr. O (voiced by Dan Russell)
- Stan Lee (voiced by Adam Diggle)
- Hammy (vocal effects provided by Billy West)

== Cast ==
- Arnold Schwarzenegger as Arnold Armstrong / Captain Fantastic
- Desiree Burch as Principal Shoutzalot
- Shelley Longworth as Billy / Blocker
- Penelope Rawlins as Jet / Jackson Jet
- Rae Lim as Lin / Cray-Cray
- Nneka Okoye as Patty / Patty Putty
- Jules de Jongh as Pedro / Power Pedro
- Shash Hira as Vik / Sticky
- Dan Russell as Nigel Danforth / Dr. Superior and Mr. O
- Adam Diggle as Stan Lee

== Production ==
In May 2019, production began on the series, after Arnold Schwarzenegger was cast in the lead role as Arnold Armstrong / Captain Fantastic. He served as a co-executive producer with Paul Wachter, CEO of Main Street Advisors, and Fabian Nicieza, who also developed the series. On June 15, 2020, Amazon Prime Video acquired the series. On June 20, 2020, John Landis signed on to direct and executive produce all of the episodes. The season was to consist of 52 episodes.

In July 2020, Genius Brands and Archie Comics published the late Stan Lee's comic book Superhero Kindergarten, in a multi-year partnership agreement. As with other adaptations of his works, Lee made several cameo appearances in the series. The series was the last project Lee personally worked on. Discussing his work on the series, lead actor Arnold Schwarzenegger said, "Superhero Kindergarten is near and dear to my heart, the greatest superhero to ever live. What an honor it was to collaborate with Stan Lee on the creation of the series, and I am absolutely thrilled that our new series has resonated so strongly with audiences right out of the gate". In 2021, Steven Banks was revealed to have served as a writer on the series.

During an April 2021 interview on Jimmy Kimmel Live!, Schwarzenegger stated that the idea behind the making of Superhero Kindergarten came from his desire "to do a sequel to Kindergarten Cop". Schwarzenegger reiterated this in a May 2021 interview on The Kelly Clarkson Show, while adding that Stan Lee told him "[he had] an idea for an animated show. What about Superhero Kindergarten, where you're a kindergarten teacher for kids who have superpowers? You have been a superhero yourself (in the show) but you're now retired and teaching those kids how to be good contributors and how to save the world in the future".

== Episodes ==
No.	Title	Directed by	Written by	Original release date
1	"The First Day of School"	John Landis	Steven Banks	April 23, 2021
One of the earth's greatest protectors, Captain Fantastic, ends up expelling his powers to win a final battle with his nemesis Dr. Superior. Five years later, when it is revealed that a group of unsuspecting toddlers in the vicinity of the fight were exposed to super-energy particles, he must become a kindergarten teacher to the now super-powered kids to train them as a new generation of young heroes.
2	"Art of the Steal"	John Landis	Steven Banks	April 23, 2021
The Super K's take a field trip to an art museum and must stop thieves from making off with the prize art.
3	"Hammy"	John Landis	Steven Banks	April 30, 2021
The class gains a pet, Hammy the hamster, and learn about taking care of a pet who also has superpowers.
4	"Super K's vs. The Fearsome Foursome"	John Landis	Steven Banks	May 7, 2021
The Super K's encounter academic and villainous rivals from the Academy for Superior Children, led by the former Dr. Superior.
5	"Call Me Hugzilla"	John Landis	Steven Banks	May 14, 2021
A superhero lesson on creative thinking leads Billy to question what it means to be a monster.
6	"One Dark Night"	John Landis	Steven Banks	May 21, 2021
Dueling sleep overs and pranks lead to a lesson on overcoming your fears - real or imagined.
7	"The Experiment"	John Landis	Steven Banks	June 4, 2021
Dr. Superior kidnaps Billy and Jackson in a bid to regain his superpowers.
8	"Sleeping Duty"	John Landis	Steven Banks	June 18, 2021
When Mr. Armstrong falls asleep in class, the kids take on an important mission without him.
9	"Castaways"	John Landis	Steven Banks	June 25, 2021
The Super K's accidentally takes off in a hot air balloon without Mr. Armstrong and crash onto a deserted island.
10	"How the Super Ks Save Christmas, Part 1"	John Landis	Steven Banks	July 2, 2021
Nigel Danforth and the Academy children plan to ruin the Super K's Christmas pageant.
11	"How the Super Ks Save Christmas, Part 2"	John Landis	Steven Banks	July 9, 2021
Having disrupted the Christmas festivities, Dr. Superior plans to kidnap Santa Claus.
12	"Lost in a Space Odyssey Trek"	John Landis	Steven Banks	July 16, 2021
A trip to the Greenville Science Museum leads to an out of this world adventure.
13	"Super Ks Gone Bad"	John Landis	Steven Banks	July 23, 2021
The Super K's are doing horrible, no good, super bad things all over Greenville, but is it them? When Nigel Danforth is involved, all bets are off.
14	"The Substitute"	John Landis	Steven Banks	July 30, 2021
When Mr. Armstrong misses class to attend a retired superhero meeting, the new substitute teaches the Super K's a lesson on trusting their instincts.
15	"Hall of Fame"	John Landis	Steven Banks	August 6, 2021
When Captain Fantastic is inducted into the Super Hero Hall of Fame, Nigel Danforth decides to do everything he can to disrupt the main event.
16	"Bessie We Hardly Knew Ye"	John Landis	Steven Banks	August 13, 2021
Vik's quest to find Bessie the lake monster teaches everyone that just because you can't see something doesn't mean it isn't real.
17	"The Magic Ring"	John Landis	Steven Banks	August 20, 2021
A trip to meet Mr. Armstrong's friends Penn and Teller leads to a magical mystery that only the Super K's can solve: finding out what happened to Houdini's Ring.
18	"Time Trippers"	John Landis	Steven Banks	August 27, 2021
The Super K's accidental trip through time teaches everyone that history is best left in the past.
19	"Checkmate"	John Landis	Steven Banks	September 3, 2021
Mr. Armstrong is scheduled for a chess match with the champion Natasha Badinski, who's secretly planning a heist.
20	"Weirdo World"	John Landis	Steven Banks	September 10, 2021
The Super K's encounter an evil Captain Fantastic from a parallel world.
21	"A Royal Visit"	John Landis	Steven Banks	September 17, 2021
A Super K royal visit with Princess Zamunda turns chaotic when her priceless tiara goes missing.
22	"The Paris Affair"	John Landis	Steven Banks	September 24, 2021
A geography lesson and a story about Mr. Armstrong's long lost love leads to an adventure in Paris to save the city from the dastardly Joan of Dark.
23	"Earthlings Got Talent"	John Landis	Steven Banks	October 1, 2021
When Patty, Billy, and Vik are abducted by aliens, Mr. Armstrong and the rest of the Super K's must race to save them from the most dangerous talent show in the universe.
24	"Captain Fantastic Begins"	John Landis	Steven Banks	October 8, 2021
The origins of Captain Fantastic, Dr. Superior, and their superpowers are revealed.
25	"Austrian Adventure"	John Landis	Steven Banks	October 15, 2021
The Super Ks take a trip to Austria with Mr. Armstrong to solve the mystery of the missing mini horse.
26	"Emerson"	John Landis	Steven Banks	October 22, 2021
An exchange student from England, Emerson, leaves the Super K's unsure if he can keep up with them due to his being in a wheelchair. When the alien Kremlon reveals himself and endangers the entire team, Emerson's powers are needed to save the day. Despite this, Kremlon captures and transports the team away.

== Release ==
The first two episodes of Superhero Kindergarten were released on the Kartoon Channel on April 23, 2021, with subsequent episodes released weekly. The first episode premiered on January 29, 2021, which included an introduction from series star, Arnold Schwarzenegger.

== Reception ==
=== Critical response ===
Alessia Santoro, of PopSugar, gave a positive review, saying "it's the perfect show for superhero-loving parents and their kids to enjoy together".

=== Ratings ===
The first two episodes were watched by over 2 million viewers. By May 3, 2021, the first three episodes surpassed 9 million views. Andy Heyward, chairman and CEO of Genius Brands, discussed the episodes' ratings, by saying "this breaks every record for us on the channel and goes beyond our wildest expectation for the series weekend debut. In the new world of streaming media, it's hard to compare apples to oranges, but if Superhero Kindergarten were a feature movie, we would be doing cartwheels with this 'opening weekend box office'".
