= Paul Wachter =

American investment advisor

- Born: 1956 (age 69–70)
- Education: Wharton School of the University of Pennsylvania (B.S.); Columbia Law School (J.D.)
- Occupations: Investment advisor, entrepreneur, television producer
- Spouse: Liza Atkins (m. 1987)

Paul David Wachter is an American businessman and investment adviser whose clients include Arnold Schwarzenegger, LeBron James, U2 frontman Bono, Beats by Dre co-founder Jimmy Iovine, Drake, Billie Eilish and Tom Werner, Chairman of the Boston Red Sox and Liverpool Football Club.

He has played a leading role in high-profile investment deals including the 2002 acquisition of the Boston Red Sox by New England Sports Ventures (now Fenway Sports Group), an ownership group he became partner to in 2021. Wachter was also a founding member of the board of Beats Electronics since 2008 and led the negotiation of the Beats sale to Apple. Along with LeBron James, he was among the executive producers of the Starz scripted series, Survivor's Remorse, and HBO’s What's My Name, a documentary on Muhammad Ali, and is the executive producer of the 2023 Netflix series Arnold. He is now Chairman of the Board of United Talent Agency (UTA).

== Education ==
Wachter is a graduate of Riverdale Country School in The Bronx, New York. In 1978, he graduated magna cum laude and Beta Gamma Sigma from the Wharton School of the University of Pennsylvania, and in 1981, he earned his juris doctor from Columbia University Law School, where he was a James Kent Scholar and a Harlan Fiske Stone Scholar.

== Career ==
Wachter is founder and CEO of financial and asset management advisory firm Main Street Advisors. The company was founded in 1997. Previously, Wachter was an investment banker for Schroder & Co. Incorporated, Kidder, Peabody & Co. and Bear, Stearns & Company.

In 2002, Wachter advised John W. Henry and Tom Werner on the New England Sports Ventures' acquisition of the Boston Red Sox. Henry was principal owner and Werner was executive chairman. In 2001, New England Sports Ventures changed its name to Fenway Sports Group.

Wachter has been LeBron James' financial advisor since 2004. He "routinely connects James with business heavyweights" such as Warren Buffett and has helped James "ink various investment and partnership deals". He negotiated James' notable lifetime Nike deal in 2015, which has been reported to reach a lifetime total of over $1 billion. Wachter conceived of a deal between James and Fenway Sports Group, which gave James a minority interest in the FSG-owned soccer club Liverpool.

In 2004, then-California governor Arnold Schwarzenegger appointed Wachter to the University of California Board of Regents where he remained until 2016. Wachter has known Schwarzenegger since the late 1970s and has managed his investments. He acted as an advisor and strategist to Schwarzenegger's 2003 and 2006 campaigns and transition teams. Wachter was also the trustee for Schwarzenegger's blind trust during Schwarzenegger's time as Governor and is a senior financial advisor for the former Governor.

Wachter is also associated with other investments such as Kate Farm, Dave's Hot Chicken, Zwift, the TPG Growth fund, the Beverly Hilton, Waldorf Astoria Beverly Hills, Blaze Pizza, and other properties. Through Main Street Advisors, he is also a founding investor of Ladder, a company founded with LeBron James, Arnold Schwarzenegger, Cindy Crawford and Lindsey Vonn in 2018, NTWRK, a digital e-commerce company co-founded with Jimmy Iovine and Warner Bros. Studios, and 88Rising, a music entertainment and mass media company with a focus on Asian and Asian American artists.

Wachter was executive producer of the Starz scripted series, Survivor's Remorse, and HBO's What's My Name, a documentary on Muhammad Ali, winner of the 2020 PGA Award for Outstanding Sports Program and the 2020 Sports Emmy. He co-founded Lobos 1707 with Diego Osorio, LeBron James and Maverick Carter in 2020.

In March 2021, Wachter led negotiations for himself, LeBron James and Maverick Carter to become partners in the Fenway Sports Group alongside RedBird Capital Partners, in exchange for their minority stake in Liverpool Football Club. In 2021, Wachter executive produced the animated streaming series Superhero Kindergarten, based on the comic book series of the same name by Stan Lee. Wachter is the Executive Producer of Netflix's Arnold, a documentary on Arnold Schwarzenegger.

== Boards ==
Wachter served on Time Warner's board of directors from 2010 until its acquisition by AT&T in 2018, and was on the board of Beats Electronics since the inception of the company until its purchase by Apple in 2014. He also served on the board of Beats Music. He served on the American Skiing Company's board from 1996 to 2008 and also serves on the Board of Councilors of the Jimmy Iovine and Andre Young Academy at USC.

Wachter has also served on the boards of Virgin America until its acquisition by Alaska Airlines in 2016, ATTN:, Ladder, Haworth Marketing and Media Company and Content Partners, LLC. He serves on the board of LeBron James’ and Maverick Carter's SpringHill Entertainment, a video production company, and Uninterrupted, a digital platform for athletes. He also serves on the Board of Trustees for Berklee College and as Chairman of After-School All-Stars, a national non-profit that partners with schools to expand the learning day for at risk children. He is now Chairman of the Board of United Talent Agency (UTA).

== Personal life ==
On May 31, 1987, Wachter married Liza Atkins in Los Angeles.
