= Mosaic (film) =

2007 animated superhero film directed by Roy Allen Smith

- Directed by: Roy Allen Smith
- Screenplay by: Scott Lobdell
- Story by: Stan Lee
- Starring: Anna Paquin; Kirby Morrow; Cam Clarke; Garry Chalk; Ron Halder; Nicole Oliver
- Edited by: Shawn Logue
- Music by: William Kevin Anderson
- Production companies: POW! Entertainment; Film Roman; Manga Entertainment
- Distributed by: Starz Distribution
- Release date: January 9, 2007
- Running time: 72 minutes
- Country: United States
- Language: English

Mosaic is a 2007 American animated superhero film about a new character created by Stan Lee. It features the voice of Anna Paquin as Maggie Nelson and with supporting roles done by Kirby Morrow, Cam Clarke, Garry Chalk, Ron Halder, and Nicole Oliver. It was released under the Stan Lee Presents banner, which is a series of direct-to-DVD animated films distributed by POW! Entertainment with Anchor Bay Entertainment. The story was by Stan Lee, with the script by former X-Men writer Scott Lobdell. Mosaic was released on DVD on January 9, 2007, and had its television premiere on March 10, 2007, on Cartoon Network's Toonami block.

== Plot ==
Aspiring young actress Maggie Nelson (Anna Paquin), who lives in New York City with her father, an Interpol agent, gains chameleon-like powers one night after she gets unknowingly caught between a severe electrical storm and a magic rune her father had brought home to study after finding it at the scene of a murder at a New York City museum. Her powers are from a secret and ancient race known as the Chameliel, who are able to hide in plain sight due to their shape shifting abilities, and she is told all about the Chameliel after meeting a young Chameliel named Mosaic (Kirby Morrow). The murder victim at the museum was a Chameliel who was killed by another Chameliel named Maniken, who is stealing some of the powerful Chameliel stones hidden around the world to use them to gain the alchemical powers of his dead wife Facade, and ruling the world. After Maniken kidnaps her father, Maggie becomes determined to help Mosaic to fight Maniken.

The two go from New York City, to the catacombs of Rome, to a large radio dish at the north magnetic pole, trying to stop Maniken, as he plans to sacrifice Maggie's father as part of a ceremony to use the Chameliel stones to transfer to Maniken the powers of his wife from her body and rule the Earth like a god. As Maniken prepares to begin the ceremony on the radio dish, Maggie uses her shape-shifting abilities with her acting skills to fool Maniken into believing she is his dead wife come back to life, to distract him from noticing Mosaic is planting explosives that destroy everything on the radio dish and render the ceremony impossible, and getting her father to safety. During the battle against Maniken, it is revealed that Mosaic is Maniken and Facade's son who volunteered to the rest of the Chameliel to go after his father and stop him. Maniken is defeated when Mosaic willingly sends both of them tumbling into an icy gorge, sacrificing himself to stop his father forever. Maggie then sneaks onto the Interpol copter her father is taken aboard, where she overhears him vowing to destroy all Chameliel.

Upon returning home, she plans to continue acting and agrees to her father's request to continue her studies, but at the same time, acknowledging her powers as the piece of the rest of the Chameliel within her, she vows to search for the remaining Chameliel stones and use their power for good, and honor Mosaic and the rest of the Chameliel by becoming the new Mosaic.

== Cast ==
- Anna Paquin as Maggie Nelson/Mosaic
- Kirby Morrow as Morrow (Mosaic)
- Kathleen Barr as Facade and Mrs. Nottenmyer
- Garry Chalk as Nathan Nelson
- Cam Clarke as Stephan
- Ron Halder as Manikin and an Italian captain
- Stan Lee as Stanley the security guard
- Scott McNeil as Mr. Bullwraith and a landlord
- Nicole Oliver as Agent Newell
- Jim Ward as a tour guide and a belligerent detective

== Reception ==
Critical reception for Mosaic has been generally favorable. Felix Vasquez Jr reviewed Mosaic for Cinema Crazed, where he praised the voice acting of Anna Paquin and the film's lore. The film also received a review from Film Threat's Josiah Teal, who noted that the film felt like a cartoon pilot as opposed to a feature film but that it was still a "fun and compelling origin story." Todd Gilchrist of IGN rated it at 5/10, writing that "Mosaic lives up to its title and then some - it's essentially a pastiche of comic book conventions and little more - so if you're an older viewer or more mature fan of the art form, then skip this DVD."
