= Lobos 1707 =

Independent spirits producer

Lobos 1707 Tequila & Mezcal
- Type: Tequila, Mezcal Artesanal
- Manufacturer: Compañia Tequilera de Arandas S.A. de C.V.
- Origin: Mexico
- Introduced: November 2020
- Proof (US): 80-84 Proof
- Website: https://www.lobos1707.com/

Lobos 1707 is a Mexican tequila and mezcal company founded by Diego Osorio in 2020. The company is named for the Spanish word for "wolf" and the year that Osorio's ancestor allegedly developed the tequila recipe.

== History ==
Diego Osorio launched Lobos 1707 aiming to recreate a process inspired by the 16th-century voyages of his ancestor. It resulted in bringing Spanish oak barrels filled with Mexican agave liquor back to Spain. The company was launched on November 18, 2020, in New York, California, and Florida.

Basketball player LeBron James was an early investor. He met Osorio through financial advisor Paul Wachter.

On March 19, 2021, Lobos 1707 announced their expansion into the Canadian market, with sales through the Liquor Control Board of Ontario.

== Products and design ==
Lobos 1707 Tequila and Mezcal are cultivated from 100% blue weber agave and finished in Pedro Ximénez wine barrels, using the Solera method before bottling. Product design includes the Osorio Family Coat of Arms and the Agave Wind Rose Compass to represent the union of Spanish and Mexican cultures.

- Lobos 1707 Tequila, Joven is carbon-filtered.
- Lobos 1707 Tequila, Reposado rests for over six months in American white oak barrels. The liquid is blended with Lobos 1707 Tequila, Extra Añejo.
- Lobos 1707 Tequila, Extra Añejo is aged for three years in American white oak.
- Lobos 1707 Mezcal is made with 100% espadín agave which has been roasted in an open fire pit.
