= MarvelousTV =

Ownership
- Owner: POW! Entertainment; Vuguru

History
- Launched: April 17, 2012; 14 years ago

Links
- Website: (defunct)

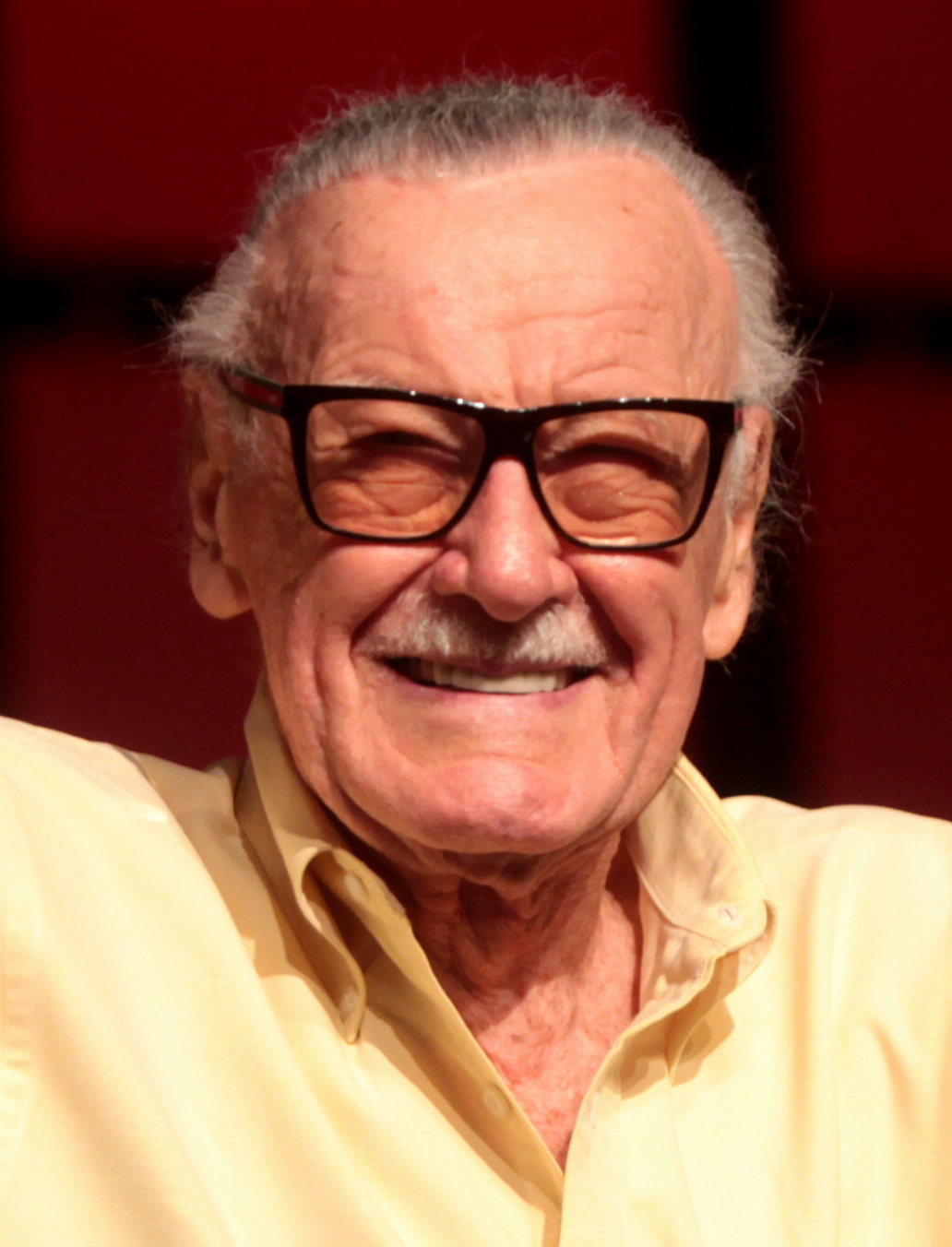
Stan Lee

MarvelousTV (formerly known as Stan Lee's World of Heroes) is a YouTube-funded channel on YouTube. The channel was created by Stan Lee.

== History ==
The first video posted onto World of Heroes, on April 17, 2012, is an episode of a program on the channel, Fan Wars. Other programs on the channel include Stan Lee's Super Model, Head Cases, Bad Days, Stan Lee's Academy of Heroes, Stan's Rants, UnCONventional, Geek D.I.Y., and Cocktails w/ Stan. Vuguru and POW! Entertainment, who pitched the idea of the channel and collaborated to create the channel, unveiled the channel at San Diego Comic-Con in 2012. The show, Stan's Rants, is based on Lee's old Soapbox column. Felicia Day has appeared in an episode of Cocktails w/ Stan.

In 2012, Lee discussed World of Heroes in a Q&A session at the New York Comic Con. Stan Lee then hired KLOMP! Animation, to make a series called Bad Days for the channel. This series depicted superheroes having bad days, with each episode having a unique recorded Stan Lee audio clip.
