= Ultimo (manga) =

Japanese manga series

- Japanese cover of Ultimo Vol. 1

機巧童子ULTIMO(ウルティモ) (Karakuri Dōji Urutimo)
- Genre: Action; Mecha; Superhero
- Created by: Stan Lee
- Manga

Chapter 0
- Written by: Stan Lee
- Illustrated by: Hiroyuki Takei
- Published by: Shueisha
- English publisher: NA: Viz Media
- Magazine: Jump SQ.II
- English magazine: NA: Shonen Jump
- Published: April 18, 2008
- Manga
- Written by: Stan Lee; Hiroyuki Takei
- Illustrated by: Hiroyuki Takei
- Published by: Shueisha
- English publisher: NA: Viz Media
- Imprint: Jump Comics SQ.
- Magazine: Jump Square
- English magazine: NA: Shonen Jump
- Original run: March 2009 – October 2015
- Volumes: 12

Ultimo, full title Karakuridôji Ultimo (機巧童子ULTIMO, Karakuri Dōji Urutimo; lit. 'Ultimo the Mechanical Boy'), is a Japanese manga series created by American comic writer Stan Lee (and his production company Pow Entertainment) and illustrated by Hiroyuki Takei. The plot of the story depicts a conflict between good and evil, implicated through the Karakuridôji created by the character Dr. Dunstan. The pilot chapter "Karakuridôji Ultimo: Chapter 0" (機巧童子 ウルティモ: ゼロ, "Karakuri Dōji ULTIMO: Zero") was originally published in a special issue of Jump Square, called Jump SQ.II, on April 18, 2008. The series Ultimo was first serialized in Jump Square in March 2009, and it continued monthly serialization. Shueisha also published Ultimo in tankōbon format—the first published on July 3, 2009, and the fifth on November 4, 2010.

Viz Media later licensed the manga for an English language adaptation in North America and published "Chapter: 0" in the September 2008 issue of Shonen Jump. In promotion of the English adaptation, a press conference was held at the 2008 New York Comic Con with promotional artwork. The series Ultimo was serialized monthly in Shonen Jump, beginning in the July 2009 issue and ending serialization in the February 2011 issue. It is now published directly into volumes, each containing multiple chapters of the series. Starting from volume 7, Ultimo was changed to Shonen Jump Advanced while it was marked as just Shonen Jump in volumes 1–6.

== Plot ==
=== Pilot chapter ===
Ultimo and Vice were created in feudal Japan to be "perfect good" and "perfect evil" as Dr. Dunstan's "last curse upon this world." A thousand years later, a monster wearing a Noh mask wreaks havoc in Farmless City of Western Tokyo, while the S.K.A.T. Police unit cannot stop it. Ultimo plunges in to destroy the monster, explaining that the creature is about to show its true form, Vice, Ultimo's evil counterpart. The mechanical boys end their fight both badly damaged, and the movement of select groups around Japan begins.

=== Serialization ===
Yamato Agari is a 21st-century reincarnation of a bandit from the Heian period. As in the past, Yamato meets the "Karakuridôji", mechanical boys, that transform his otherwise normal life into a battle of good versus evil. Immediately after Yamato meets the dôji Ultimo, another one called Vice appears, and he barely escapes from their fight. Now acquainted with Ultimo, Yamato is confronted by many other dôji, both evil and good.

Yamato's fights become increasingly dangerous as the fifteen prominent dôji meet on the day of the "Hundred Machine Funeral", the last day of the world as we know it. With imminent destruction at hand, Yamato uses Ultimo's ability to bring the world back to the day he first meets the dôji. In order to avoid the catastrophe from repeating itself, Yamato plans to learn for himself the meanings of "good and evil" by meeting each of the dôji himself.

Dunstan later reveals that the Hundred Machine Funeral isn't a fight to the death, which most of the doji believed; they are instead supposed to try winning a Good/Evil doji over to their side within a time limit. The side that has the most doji on it at the end of the time limit is the winner. Observing the contest for Dunstan is his own daughter.

== Characters ==
The major characters in Ultimo possess their own Karakuridôji, humanoid dolls each based on the Six Perfections or Seven Deadly Sins, good or evil respectively.

=== Main characters ===
Yamato Agari (東 大和, Agari Yamato)
Yamato Agari is the main protagonist of the series alongside Ultimo. Yamato has the same name and appearance as a bandit from the Heian period, whom he is reincarnated from. In the twelfth century, he considers the corrupt nobility evil and opposes them. He first meets Ultimo and Dunstan in this past life. The twenty-first century Yamato does not appear to be very bright, as his friends often joke about him. He is impulsive, and tends to yell when he speaks. Jealousy's heart-reading reveals that there is "something warm and peaceful" within Yamato.
Ultimo (ウルティモ, Urutimo)
Ultimo is a scarlet-colored Karakuridôji who personifies ultimate good. Ultimo first meets Yamato in twelfth century Japan (though he is created in the thirtieth century from which Dr. Dunstan travels). He cares deeply for his master Yamato and tends to react emotionally over his safety, becoming a deadly threat to his enemies. During Yamato's original life, Ultimo was tricked into killing his lover, Lady Gekko; as a result, he hides this fact from the reincarnated Yamato. As a dôji, Ultimo has oversized, transforming gauntlets, mediums for his Noh powers. Ultimo's transformations are modeled after cranes or lions, and he has the power to control time and space.

=== Antagonists ===
K (ケー, Kē)
K is one of main antagonists and a former member of the S.K.A.T. Police, then called "Agent K." K quits his job once becoming the Vice Master, and relies solely on Vice to steal for his living. He usually has a creepy demeanor, but sometimes bursts into pitiful rages. K is admittedly weak, and could faint quickly in a direct fight. K favors saying "crazy!" to describe something he sees.
Vice (バイス, Baisu)
Vice is the green-clothed Evil Dôji Socho, representing ultimate evil, and as such shares the main antagonist role with K. Vice carries much disdain for Ultimo and his actions, since they interfere with his violent intentions. His clawed, green gauntlets become weapons through his Karakuri Henge, usually resembling a turtle, and always with bladed edges. He intends to kill Dunstan to allow him and the other evil Doji to rule the earth. His noh is "Incompetence", which is considered the ultimate evil; he causes an explosion, leaving nothing behind.
Jealousy (ジェラス, Jerasu)
Jealousy is a blue-themed Karakuridôji, representative of envy of the Seven Deadly Sins. Compared to the other dôji, Jealousy is rather stoic by nature, viewing Ultimo as a hypocrite for representing good despite being so violent. Jealousy sees no problems with killing, and consistently does so to Tomomitsu Iruma (入間 智光, Iruma Tomomitsu), his master's various reincarnations from the twelfth through into the twenty-first century, for his shallow ideas of evil. His Karakuri Henge resemble spiders, and he has the power of telepathy. Jealousy desires to have Yamato for his master, since he is highly incompetent. In the literally rebooted present day, Jealousy chooses Rune as his master; the second time, as both mutually desire Yamato, though for different reasons.

=== Other characters ===
Roger Dunstan (ロジャー ダンスタン, Rojā Dansutan)
Dr. Roger Dunstan is the Stan Lee-esque creator of Ultimo and Vice who travelled back from the year 2989. Along with Ultimo and Vice, he created the one hundred Karakuridôji as an experiment in order to find out which is ultimately stronger, good or evil, eventually culminating in the "Hundred Machine Funeral". From his experiments, Dunstan has control over all elements and dimensions, and thus theoretically is capable of anything imaginable. He also possesses the dôji Milieu (ミリュー, Miryū), the embodiment of moderation, who can control the time periods into which people are reincarnated; Milieu also shares Dunstan's desire to find out if good or evil is the most powerful, being neutral in the balance between both. Though it appears the Doji master selection is left up to random or opportune choice, Dunstan is revealed have precisely calculated which people to have as or be possible masters to his creations; Milieu said as much when they saved future Yamato from being killed by Jealousy in the past.
Shin Ekoda (江古田 新, Ekoda Shin)
Shin "Eco" Ekoda is a 38-year-old sushi chef at his restaurant Eco Sushi (エコ寿司, Eko Sushi), and is also a member of the Club of Good Dôji, led by Yamato. Eco reads Weekly Shōnen Jump comics as his "scriptures", a trait from being a monk in his past life; he explained to Musashi that reading them will explain why Yamato is the best choice to lead the Club of Good Doji. His dôji Regula (レグラ, Regura) represents discipline of the Six Perfections, possessing the power to alter memories in order to keep the Karakuridôji secret from the rest of the world.
Musashi Murayama (村山 武蔵, Murayama Musashi)
Murayama is a police officer from the future that followed Dunstan into the 21st century. His goal is to capture the criminal Dunstan for his illegal dimensional studies. His Karakuridôji, Sophia (ソピア, Sopia), represents wisdom of the Six Perfections; Sophia became pledged to Musashi when Dunstan used him as a shield. He has thoroughly studied Dunstan's motives, knowing that the old man is clever enough to take into account the possibility of Good Doji masters refusing to participate in the Hundred Machine Funeral.
Rune Kodaira (小平 ルネ, Kodaira Rune)
Rune is Yamato's friend and classmate. He acts collectedly, and often shows concern for Yamato. During the Heian era, he was originally a young noblewoman, Lady Gekko, who held romantic feelings toward the bandit Yamato. Reborn as a man in the present, however he still holds hidden feelings for his friend which have bloomed into a secret obsession with keeping Yamato to himself. Rune is deeply in love with Yamato and keeps a massive portrait of him portrayed in a way that implies that Rune stalks Yamato outside of school. Because of this, along with Yamato's infatuation with Makoto Sayama, Rune's deep-seated envy causes him to become the new master of the dôji Jealousy and to oppose Yamato. Rune is prime example the Milieu's ability to control reincarnation is not perfect; Rune is a different gender in his present life.
Makoto Sayama (狭山 真琴, Sayama Makoto)
Makoto is a girl who goes to the same high school as Yamato Agari. She is the target of Yamato's affections through the series. After Eco's death, she becomes Regula's new master with memories of her past life just like the other Doji masters. She is later revealed to be Roger Dunstan's daughter, who is overseeing the Hundred Machine Funeral in his place. Her actual name is Makoto Saya Dunstan (真琴・サーヤ・ダンスタン Makoto Sāya Dunstan) and, while fully aware of Yamato's crush, she finds him to be annoying and very much beneath her.

== Production ==
Ultimo was first announced as an unnamed work between Stan Lee, the co-creator of iconic superhero titles such as Spider-Man and X-Men, and Hiroyuki Takei, the creator of Shaman King. According to Stan Lee in an audio interview, he was called by Dream Ranch and JEA who said that they wanted him to create a manga with them, and that it was to be published by Shueisha. Stan Lee stated that he has never made a comic about two robots of the same level of power, with one not being as heroic as the other. In conceptualizing Ultimo, Stan Lee wanted to create something that both Japanese and American readers would enjoy. The first fully colorized picture of Vice and Ultimo was released on the Jump Square website on April 4, 2008. The pilot chapter was finally finished and published in Jump SQ. II.

I am deeply honored for this great opportunity to collaborate with an award-winning artist/writer of the stature of Hiroyuki Takei. I enthusiastically expect that the combination of an American story-telling style merged with Takei-san's acclaimed Japanese style will result in our joint creation Ultimo presenting an original, exciting type of manga that will appeal to comic book fans around the world.

— Stan Lee, quoted from press release.

On the same day as the release, Viz hosted a press event in the Shonen Jump panel, attended by Stan Lee, Takanori Asada (Jump Square editor), and Marc Weidenbaum (Shonen Jump editor-in-chief) at the 2008 New York Comic Con. Two promotional art pieces by Hiroyuki Takei were created, one with Ultimo and the other with Dr. Dunstan both including the manga's logo. "I'm so happy that we can work with such a great creator as Stan Lee. I am so happy that two great actors are working together, and I know that Ultimo will be a great work", said Takanori Asada at the press event.

== Manga ==
The 32-page pilot chapter "Karakuridôji Ultimo Chapter: 0" premiered in the first issue of Jump SQ.II on April 18, 2008, with the first three pages in full color. The first three pages were earlier revealed as part of a preview for Jump SQ. II on Shueisha's S-Manga.Net. "Chapter: 0" was later adapted into English by Viz Media, and published in the September 2008 issue of their Shonen Jump manga anthology, which went on sale on August 5, 2008.

The main series Ultimo continued publication in the main Jump Square anthology, beginning serialization in its March 2009 issue. Viz Media has licensed the series for North American distribution in Shonen Jump, and it was serialized starting in its July 2009 issue.

== Reception ==
The English translation of the Ultimo pilot chapter was reviewed by Leroy Douresseaux of Comic Book Bin. "This prologue of Ultimo doesn't really offer enough to evaluate it, except to say that the dialogue and exposition are awkward and clunky enough to seem like the work of an amateur rather than a seasoned veteran" said Leroy Douresseaux. Leroy referred to Ultimo as a blend of mecha manga, Dragon Ball, and Green Lantern. "I'm too intrigued to be disappointed by what I read. Stan Lee's best work was created when he riffed off unique and powerfully imaginative creators (Jack Kirby and Steve Ditko), so I'm curious to see what this combo of Lee and a manga-ka like Takei can do."
