= The Guardian Project (comics) =

Guardian Media Entertainment superhero squad

The Guardian Project is a superhero squad created by Stan Lee for Guardian Media Entertainment, in conjunction with the National Hockey League. Each NHL Franchise is represented by one of the 30 heroes, titled "Guardians". They are all named in accordance with the name of the team (e.g., The Flame for the Calgary Flames).

== Plot ==
Mike Mason is a 15-year-old hockey fan who sketched 30 different characters for the NHL teams, designing their powers and personalities, giving them alter-egos and writing about grand adventures they would embark on. Once the evil Devin Dark and his military machines attack Earth, Mason's characters come to life as the Guardians.

== Marketing ==
The Guardian characters were revealed sequentially according to a bracket pairing Guardians and encouraging fans to vote via Facebook on which character they would like to see first. The superheroes were revealed every day from January 1, 2011, until January 30, in time for the 2011 NHL All-Star Game in Raleigh, North Carolina. By June, NBCUniversal had signed a multimillion-dollar deal with GME, hoping to exploit the Guardian franchise in various media. But by December 2011, the project had failed to develop momentum and was dropped without further fanfare.
