= Stan Lee =

American comic book writer (1922–2018)

- Lee in 2007
- Born: Stanley Martin Lieber; December 28, 1922 New York City, U.S.
- Died: November 12, 2018 (aged 95) Los Angeles, California, U.S.
- Areas: Comic book writer; editor; publisher; producer
- Collaborators: Jack Kirby; Steve Ditko; John Romita Sr.; Don Heck; Bill Everett; Joe Maneely; Dick Ayers; Joe Simon
- Awards: Will Eisner Award Hall of Fame; Jack Kirby Hall of Fame; National Medal of Arts; Disney Legends
- Spouse: Joan Boocock (m. 1947; died 2017)
- Children: 2 (1 deceased)
- Relatives: Larry Lieber (brother)

- Military career
- Branch: United States Army
- Service years: 1942–1945
- Rank: Sergeant
- Units: 1st Motion Picture Unit, Signal Corps
- Conflicts: World War II

Stan Lee (born Stanley Martin Lieber /ˈliːbər/; December 28, 1922 – November 12, 2018) was an American comic book writer, editor, publisher, and producer. He rose through the ranks of a family-run business called Timely Comics, which later became Marvel Comics. Lee was Marvel's primary creative leader for two decades, expanding it from a small publishing house division to a prominent multimedia corporation that dominated the comics and film industries.

In collaboration with others at Marvel—particularly co-plotters and artists Jack Kirby and Steve Ditko—he co-created iconic characters, including Spider-Man, the X-Men, Iron Man, Thor, the Hulk, Ant-Man, the Wasp, the Fantastic Four, Black Panther, Daredevil, Doctor Strange, the Scarlet Witch, and Black Widow. These and other characters' introductions in the 1960s pioneered a more naturalistic approach in superhero comics. In the 1970s, Lee challenged the restrictions of the Comics Code Authority, indirectly leading to changes in its policies. In the 1980s, he pursued the development of Marvel properties in other media, with mixed results.

Following his retirement from Marvel in the 1990s, Lee remained a public figurehead for the company. He frequently made cameo appearances in films and television shows based on Marvel properties, on which he received an executive producer credit, which allowed him to become the actor with the highest-grossing film total ever. He continued independent creative ventures until his death, aged 95, in 2018. Lee was inducted into the comic book industry's Will Eisner Award Hall of Fame in 1994 and the Jack Kirby Hall of Fame in 1995. He received the NEA's National Medal of Arts in 2008.

== Early life and education ==
Lee was born Stanley Martin Lieber on December 28, 1922, in the Upper West Side neighborhood of Manhattan, in the apartment of his Romanian-born Jewish immigrant parents, Celia (née Solomon), originating in Huși, Romania, and Jack Lieber (born Iancu Lieber), originating in Botoșani, Romania, at the corner of West 98th Street and West End Avenue. Lee was raised in a Jewish household. In a 2002 interview, he stated when asked if he believed in God, "Well, let me put it this way... [Pauses.] No, I'm not going to try to be clever. I really don't know. I just don't know." In another interview from 2011, when asked about his Romanian origins and his relationship with the country, he said that he had never visited it and that he did not know Romanian because his parents never taught it to him.

Lee's father, trained as a dress cutter, worked only sporadically after the Great Depression. The family moved further uptown to Fort Washington Avenue, in Washington Heights, Manhattan. Lee had one younger brother named Larry Lieber. He said in 2006 that as a child he was influenced by books and movies, particularly those with Errol Flynn playing heroic roles. Reading The Scarlet Pimpernel, he called the title character "the first superhero I had read about, the first character who could be called a superhero." By the time Lee was in his teens, the family was living in an apartment at 1720 University Avenue in The Bronx. Lee described it as "a third-floor apartment facing out back". Lee and his brother shared the bedroom, while their parents slept on a foldout couch.

Lee attended DeWitt Clinton High School in the Bronx. In his youth, Lee enjoyed writing and entertained dreams of writing the "Great American Novel" one day. He said that in his youth he worked such part-time jobs as writing obituaries for a news service and press releases for the National Tuberculosis Center; delivering sandwiches for the Jack May pharmacy to offices in Rockefeller Center; working as an office boy for a trouser manufacturer; ushering at the Rivoli Theater on Broadway; and selling subscriptions to the New York Herald Tribune newspaper. At fifteen, Lee entered a high school essay competition sponsored by the New York Herald Tribune, called "The Biggest News of the Week Contest". Lee claimed to have won the prize for three straight weeks, goading the newspaper to write him and ask him to let someone else win. The paper suggested he look into writing professionally, which Lee claimed "probably changed my life." However, Lee's story is apocryphal, and so is his story of a life-changing plea from the editor, because the likelier story is that Lee won a seventh-place prize of $2.50 and two honorable mention awards. He graduated from high school early, aged sixteen and a half, in 1939 and joined the WPA Federal Theatre Project.

== Publishing career ==
=== Early career ===
With the help of his uncle Robbie Solomon, Lee became an assistant in 1939 at the new Timely Comics division belonging to pulp magazine and comic-book publisher Martin Goodman. Timely, by the 1960s, would evolve into Marvel Comics. Lee, whose cousin Jean was Goodman's wife, was formally hired by Timely editor Joe Simon. (Note: Lee's account of how he began working for Marvel's predecessor, Timely, varied. He said in lectures and elsewhere that he simply answered a newspaper ad seeking a publishing assistant, not knowing it involved comics, let alone his cousin Jean's husband, Martin Goodman: I applied for a job in a publishing company ... I didn't even know they published comics. I was fresh out of high school, and I wanted to get into the publishing business, if I could. There was an ad in the paper that said, "Assistant Wanted in a Publishing House." When I found out that they wanted me to assist in comics, I figured, 'Well, I'll stay here for a little while and get some experience, and then I'll get out into the real world.' ... I just wanted to know, 'What do you do in a publishing company?' How do you write? ... How do you publish? I was an assistant. There were two people there named Joe Simon and Jack Kirby – Joe was sort-of the editor/artist/writer, and Jack was the artist/writer. Joe was the senior member. They were turning out most of the artwork. Then there was the publisher, Martin Goodman ... And that was about the only staff that I was involved with. After a while, Joe Simon and Jack Kirby left. I was about 17 years old [sic], and Martin Goodman said to me, 'Do you think you can hold down the job of editor until I can find a real person?' When you're 17, what do you know? I said, 'Sure! I can do it!' I think he forgot about me, because I stayed there ever since. In his 2002 autobiography, Excelsior! The Amazing Life of Stan Lee, he writes: My uncle, Robbie Solomon, told me they might be able to use someone at a publishing company where he worked. The idea of being involved in publishing definitely appealed to me. ... So I contacted the man Robbie said did the hiring, Joe Simon, and applied for a job. He took me on and I began working as a gofer for eight dollars a week... Joe Simon, in his 1990 autobiography The Comic Book Makers, gives the account slightly differently: "One day [Goodman's relative known as] Uncle Robbie came to work with a lanky 17-year-old in tow. 'This is Stanley Lieber, Martin's wife's cousin,' Uncle Robbie said. 'Martin wants you to keep him busy.'" In an appendix, Simon appears to reconcile the two accounts. He relates a 1989 conversation with Lee: Lee: I've been saying this [classified-ad] story for years, but apparently it isn't so. And I can't remember because I['ve] said it so long now that I believe it.... Simon: Your Uncle Robbie brought you into the office one day and he said, 'This is Martin Goodman's wife's nephew.' [sic] ... You were seventeen years old. Lee: Sixteen and a half! Simon: Well, Stan, you told me seventeen. You were probably trying to be older... I did hire you.)

His duties were prosaic at first. "In those days [the artists] dipped the pen in ink, [so] I had to make sure the inkwells were filled", Lee recalled in 2009. "I went down and got them their lunch, I did proofreading, I erased the pencils from the finished pages for them". Marshaling his childhood ambition to be a writer, young Stanley Lieber made his comic-book debut with the text filler "Captain America Foils the Traitor's Revenge" in Captain America Comics #3 (cover-dated May 1941), using the pseudonym Stan Lee (a play on his first name, "Stanley"), which years later he would adopt as his legal name. Lee later explained in his autobiography and numerous other sources that because of the low social status of comic books, he was so embarrassed that he used a pen name so nobody would associate his real name with comics when he wrote the Great American Novel one day. This initial story also introduced Captain America's trademark ricocheting shield-toss. It would be adapted into a sequential art story in 2014 by Lee and Bruce Timm in Marvel's 75th Anniversary Celebration.

Lee graduated from writing filler to actual comics with a backup feature, "'Headline' Hunter, Foreign Correspondent", two issues later, using the pseudonym "Reel Nats". His first superhero co-creation was the Destroyer, in Mystic Comics #6 (August 1941). Other characters he co-created during this period, called the Golden Age of Comic Books, include Jack Frost, debuting in U.S.A. Comics #1 (August 1941), and Father Time, debuting in Captain America Comics #6 (August 1941).

When Simon and his creative partner Jack Kirby left in late 1941 following a dispute with Goodman, the 30-year-old publisher installed Lee, just under 19 years old, as interim editor. The youngster showed a knack for the business that led him to remain as the comic-book division's editor-in-chief, as well as art director for much of that time, until 1972, when he would succeed Goodman as publisher.

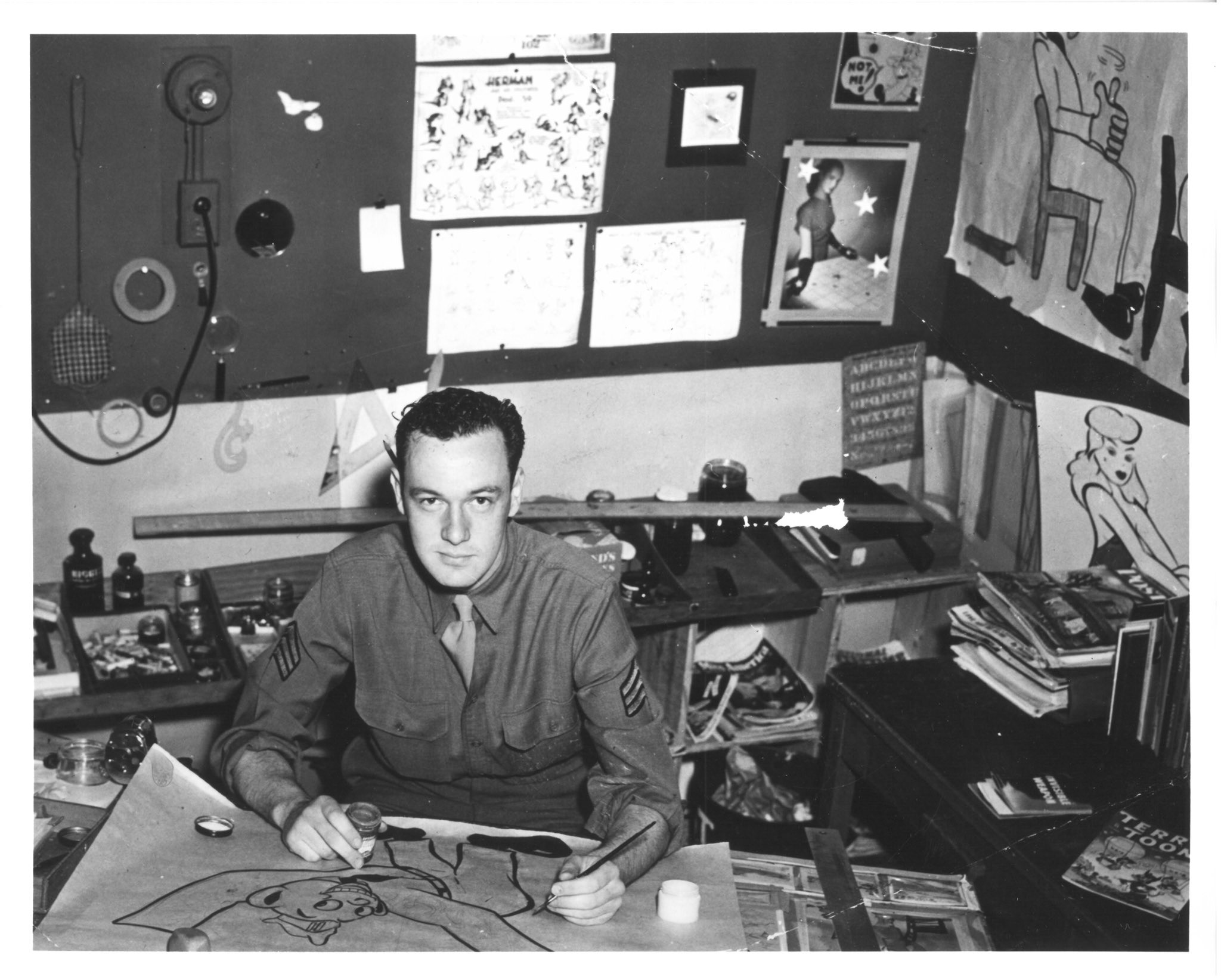
Lee in the Army, early 1940s

Lee entered the U.S. Army in early 1942 and served within the U.S. as a member of the Signal Corps, repairing telegraph poles and other communications equipment. He was later transferred to the Training Film Division, where he worked writing manuals, training films, slogans, and occasionally cartooning. His military classification, he said, was "playwright"; he added that only nine men in the U.S. Army were given that title. In the Army, Lee's division included many famous or soon-to-be famous people, including three-time Academy Award-winning director Frank Capra, New Yorker cartoonist Charles Addams, and children's book writer and illustrator Theodor Geisel, later known to the world as "Dr. Seuss".

Vincent Fago, editor of Timely's "animation comics" section, which put out humor and talking animal comics, filled in until Lee returned from his World War II military service in 1945. Lee was inducted into the Signal Corps Regimental Association and was given honorary membership of the 2nd Battalion of 3rd U.S. Infantry Regiment out of Joint Base Lewis-McChord at the 2017 Emerald City Comic Con for his prior service.

While in the Army, Lee received letters every week on Friday from the editors at Timely, detailing what they needed written and by when. Lee would write stories, then send them back on Monday. One week, the mail clerk overlooked his letter, explaining that nothing was in Lee's mailbox. The next day, Lee went by the closed mailroom and saw an envelope with the return address of Timely Comics in his mailbox. Not willing to miss a deadline, Lee asked the officer in charge to open the mailroom, but the latter refused. So Lee took a screwdriver and unscrewed the mailbox hinges, retrieving the envelope containing his assignment. The mailroom officer saw what he did and turned him into the base captain, who did not like Lee. He faced tampering charges and could have been sent to Leavenworth Prison. The colonel in charge of the Finance Department intervened and saved Lee from disciplinary action.

In the mid-1950s, by which time the company was now generally known as Atlas Comics, Lee wrote stories in a variety of genres including romance, Westerns, humor, science fiction, medieval adventure, horror and suspense. In the 1950s, Lee teamed up with his comic book colleague Dan DeCarlo to produce the syndicated newspaper strip My Friend Irma, based on the radio comedy starring Marie Wilson. By the end of the decade, Lee had become dissatisfied with his career and considered quitting the field.

=== Marvel Comics ===
==== Marvel revolution ====
In 1956, DC Comics editor Julius Schwartz revived the superhero archetype and experienced significant success with an updated version of the Flash, and later in 1960 with the Justice League of America super-team. In response, publisher Martin Goodman assigned Lee to come up with a new superhero team. Lee's wife suggested that he experiment with stories he preferred, since he was planning on changing careers and had nothing to lose.

Lee acted on the advice, giving his superheroes a flawed humanity, a change from the ideal archetypes typically written for preteens. Before this, most superheroes had been idealistically perfect people with no serious, lasting problems. Lee introduced complex, naturalistic characters who could have bad tempers, fits of melancholy, and vanity; they bickered amongst themselves, worried about paying their bills and impressing girlfriends, got bored or sometimes even physically ill.

The first superheroes Lee and artist Jack Kirby, created together were the Fantastic Four in 1961. The team's immediate popularity led Lee and Marvel's illustrators to produce a cavalcade of new titles. Again working with Kirby, Lee co-created the Hulk, Thor, Iron Man, and the X-Men; with Bill Everett, Daredevil; and with Steve Ditko, Doctor Strange and Marvel's most successful character, Spider-Man, all of whom lived in a thoroughly shared universe. Lee and Kirby gathered several of their newly created characters together into the team title The Avengers and would revive characters from the 1940s such as the Sub-Mariner and Captain America. Years later, Kirby and Lee would contest who deserved credit for creating The Fantastic Four.

Comics historian Peter Sanderson wrote that in the 1960s:

DC was the equivalent of the big Hollywood studios: After the brilliance of DC's reinvention of the superhero ... in the late 1950s and early 1960s, it had run into a creative drought by the decade's end. There was a new audience for comics now, and it wasn't just the little kids that traditionally had read the books. The Marvel of the 1960s was in its own way the counterpart of the French New Wave... Marvel was pioneering new methods of comics storytelling and characterization, addressing more serious themes, and in the process keeping and attracting readers in their teens and beyond. Moreover, among this new generation of readers were people who wanted to write or draw comics themselves, within the new style that Marvel had pioneered, and push the creative envelope still further.

Lee's revolution extended beyond the characters and storylines to the way in which comic books engaged the readership and built a sense of community between fans and creators. He introduced the practice of regularly including a credit panel on the splash page of each story, naming not just the writer and penciller but also the inker and letterer. Regular news about Marvel staff members and upcoming storylines was presented on the Bullpen Bulletins page, which (like the letter columns that appeared in each title) was written in a friendly, chatty style. Lee remarked that his goal was for fans to think of the comics creators as friends, and considered it a mark of his success on this front that, at a time when letters to other comics publishers were typically addressed "Dear Editor", letters to Marvel addressed the creators by first name (e.g., "Dear Stan and Jack"). Lee recorded messages to the newly formed Merry Marvel Marching Society fan club in 1965. By 1967, the brand was well-enough ensconced in popular culture that a March 3 WBAI radio program with Lee and Kirby as guests was titled "Will Success Spoil Spiderman [sic]".

Throughout the 1960s, Lee scripted, art-directed and edited most of Marvel's series, moderated the letters pages, wrote a monthly column called "Stan's Soapbox", and wrote endless promotional copy, often signing off with his trademark motto, "Excelsior!" (which is also the New York state motto). To maintain his workload and meet deadlines, he used a system that was used previously by various comic-book studios, but due to Lee's success with it, became known as the "Marvel Method". Typically, Lee would brainstorm a story with the artist and then prepare a brief synopsis rather than a full script. Based on the synopsis, the artist would fill the allotted number of pages by determining and drawing the panel-to-panel storytelling. After the artist turned in penciled pages, Lee would write the word balloons and captions, and then oversee the lettering and coloring. In effect, the artists were co-plotters, whose collaborative first drafts Lee built upon. For his part, Lee endeavored to use a sophisticated vocabulary in his dialogue and captions to encourage his young readers to learn new words, often playfully noting "If a kid has to go to a dictionary, that's not the worst thing that could happen."

Following Ditko's departure from Marvel in 1966, John Romita Sr. became Lee's collaborator on The Amazing Spider-Man. Within a year, it overtook Fantastic Four to become the company's top seller. Lee and Romita's stories focused as much on the social and college lives of the characters as they did on Spider-Man's adventures. The stories became more topical, addressing issues such as the Vietnam War, political elections, and student activism. Robbie Robertson, introduced in The Amazing Spider-Man #51 (August 1967) was one of the first African-American characters in comics to play a serious supporting role. In the Fantastic Four series, the lengthy run by Lee and Kirby produced many acclaimed storylines as well as characters that have become central to Marvel, including the Inhumans and the Black Panther, an African king who would be mainstream comics' first black superhero.

The story frequently cited as Lee and Kirby's finest achievement is the three-part "Galactus Trilogy" that began in Fantastic Four #48 (March 1966), chronicling the arrival of Galactus, a cosmic giant who wanted to devour the planet, and his herald, the Silver Surfer. Fantastic Four #48 was chosen as #24 in the 100 Greatest Marvels of All Time poll of Marvel's readers in 2001. Editor Robert Greenberger wrote in his introduction to the story that "As the fourth year of the Fantastic Four came to a close, Stan Lee and Jack Kirby seemed to be only warming up. In retrospect, it was perhaps the most fertile period of any monthly title during the Marvel Age." Comics historian Les Daniels noted that "[t]he mystical and metaphysical elements that took over the saga were perfectly suited to the tastes of young readers in the 1960s", and Lee soon discovered that the story was a favorite on college campuses. Lee and artist John Buscema launched The Silver Surfer series in August 1968.

The following year, Lee and Gene Colan created the Falcon, comics' first African-American superhero, in Captain America #117 (September 1969). In 1971, Lee indirectly helped reform the Comics Code. The U.S. Department of Health, Education and Welfare had asked Lee to write a comic-book story about the dangers of drugs, and Lee conceived a three-issue subplot in The Amazing Spider-Man #96–98 (cover-dated May–July 1971), in which Peter Parker's best friend becomes addicted to prescription drugs. The Comics Code Authority refused to grant its seal because the stories depicted drug use; the anti-drug context was considered irrelevant. With Goodman's cooperation and confidence that the original government request would give him credibility, Lee had the story published without the seal. The comics sold well, and Marvel won praise for its socially conscious efforts. The CCA subsequently loosened the Code to permit negative depictions of drugs, among other new freedoms.

Lee also supported using comic books to provide some measure of social commentary about the real world, often dealing with racism and bigotry. "Stan's Soapbox", besides promoting an upcoming comic book project, also addressed issues of discrimination, intolerance, or prejudice.

In 1972, Lee stopped writing monthly comic books to assume the role of publisher. His final issue of The Amazing Spider-Man was #110 (July 1972) and his last Fantastic Four was #125 (August 1972).

==== Later Marvel years ====
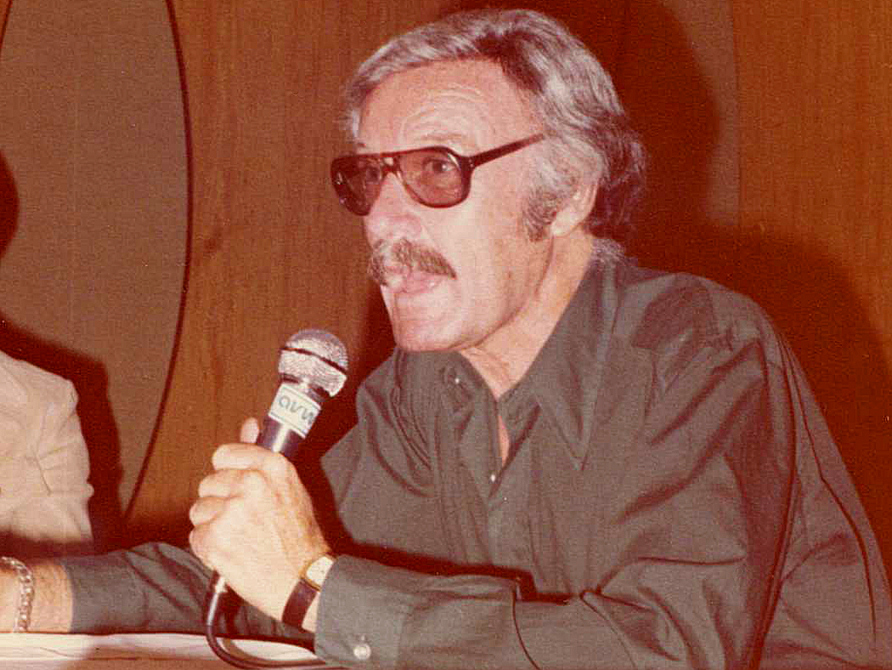
Lee speaking at a convention c. 1980

Lee became a figurehead and public face for Marvel Comics. He made appearances at comic book conventions around America, lecturing at colleges and participating in panel discussions. Lee and John Romita Sr. launched the Spider-Man newspaper comic strip on January 3, 1977. Lee's final collaboration with Jack Kirby, The Silver Surfer: The Ultimate Cosmic Experience, was published in 1978 as part of the Marvel Fireside Books series and is considered to be Marvel's first graphic novel. Lee and John Buscema produced the first issue of The Savage She-Hulk (February 1980), which introduced the female cousin of the Hulk, and crafted a Silver Surfer story for Epic Illustrated #1 (Spring 1980).

He moved to California in 1981 to develop Marvel's TV and movie properties. He was an executive producer for, and made cameo appearances in Marvel adaptations and other films. He occasionally returned to comic book writing with various Silver Surfer projects including a 1982 one-shot drawn by John Byrne, the Judgment Day graphic novel illustrated by John Buscema, the Parable limited series drawn by French artist Mœbius, and The Enslavers graphic novel with Keith Pollard. Lee was briefly president of the entire company, but soon stepped down to become publisher instead, finding that being president was too much about numbers and finance and not enough about the creative process he enjoyed.

=== Beyond Marvel ===
In 1976, Lee was one of the cartoonists who illustrated the Costello's wall. He drew Spider-Man.

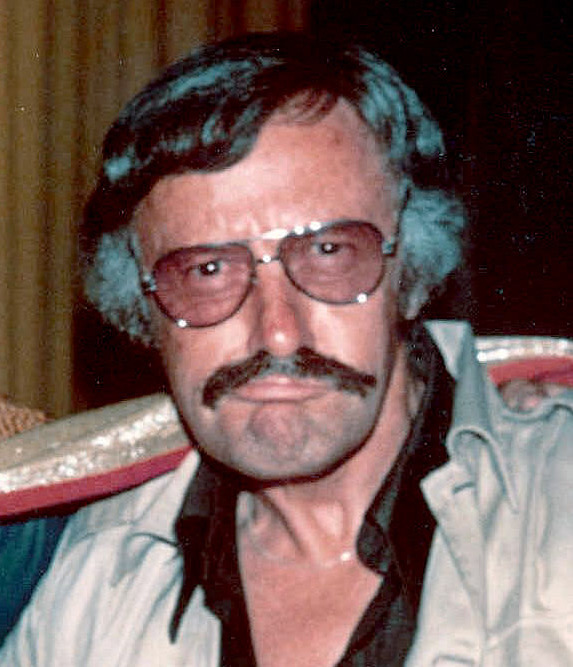
Lee in 1975 at San Diego Comic-Con

Lee stepped away from regular duties at Marvel in the 1990s, though he continued to receive an annual salary of $1 million as chairman emeritus. In 1998, he and Peter Paul began a new Internet-based superhero creation, production, and marketing studio, Stan Lee Media. It grew to 165 people and went public through a reverse merger structured by investment banker Stan Medley in 1999, but, near the end of 2000, investigators discovered illegal stock manipulation by Paul and corporate officer Stephan Gordon. Stan Lee Media filed for Chapter 11 bankruptcy protection in February 2001. Paul was extradited to the U.S. from Brazil and pleaded guilty to violating SEC Rule 10b-5 in connection with trading his stock in Stan Lee Media. Lee was never implicated in the scheme.

Following the success of 20th Century Fox's 2000 X-Men film and Sony's then-current Spider-Man film, Lee sued Marvel in 2002, claiming that the company was failing to pay his share of the profits from movies featuring the characters he had co-created. Because he had done so as an employee, Lee did not own them, but in the 1990s, after decades of making little money licensing them for television and film, Marvel had promised him 10% of any future profits. Lee and the company settled in 2005 for an undisclosed seven-figure amount.

In 2001, Lee, Gill Champion, and Arthur Lieberman formed POW! (Purveyors of Wonder) Entertainment to develop film, television, and video game properties. Lee created the risqué animated superhero series Stripperella for Spike TV. That same year, DC Comics released its first work written by Lee, the Just Imagine... series, in which Lee reimagined the DC superheroes Superman, Batman, Wonder Woman, Green Lantern, and the Flash.

In 2004, POW! Entertainment went public through a reverse merger again structured by investment banker Stan Medley. Also that year, Lee announced a superhero program that would feature former Beatle Ringo Starr as the lead character. Additionally, in August of that year, Lee announced the launch of Stan Lee's Sunday Comics, a subscription service hosted by Komikwerks.com. From July 2006–September 2007, Lee hosted, co-created, executive-produced, and judged the reality television game show competition Who Wants to Be a Superhero? on the Sci-Fi Channel.

In March 2007, after Stan Lee Media had been purchased by Jim Nesfield, the company filed a lawsuit against Marvel Entertainment for $5 billion, claiming Lee had given his rights to several Marvel characters to Stan Lee Media in exchange for stock and a salary. In June 2007, Stan Lee Media sued Lee; his newer company, POW! Entertainment; and POW! subsidiary QED Entertainment.

In 2008, Lee wrote humorous captions for the political fumetti book Stan Lee Presents Election Daze: What Are They Really Saying? In April of that year, Brighton Partners and Rainmaker Animation announced a partnership with POW! to produce a CGI film series, Legion of 5. Other projects by Lee announced in the late 2000s included a line of superhero comics for Virgin Comics, a TV adaptation of the novel Hero, a foreword to Skyscraperman by skyscraper fire-safety advocate and Spider-Man fan Dan Goodwin, a partnership with Guardian Media Entertainment and The Guardian Project to create NHL superhero mascots, and work with the Eagle Initiative program to find new talent in the comic book field.

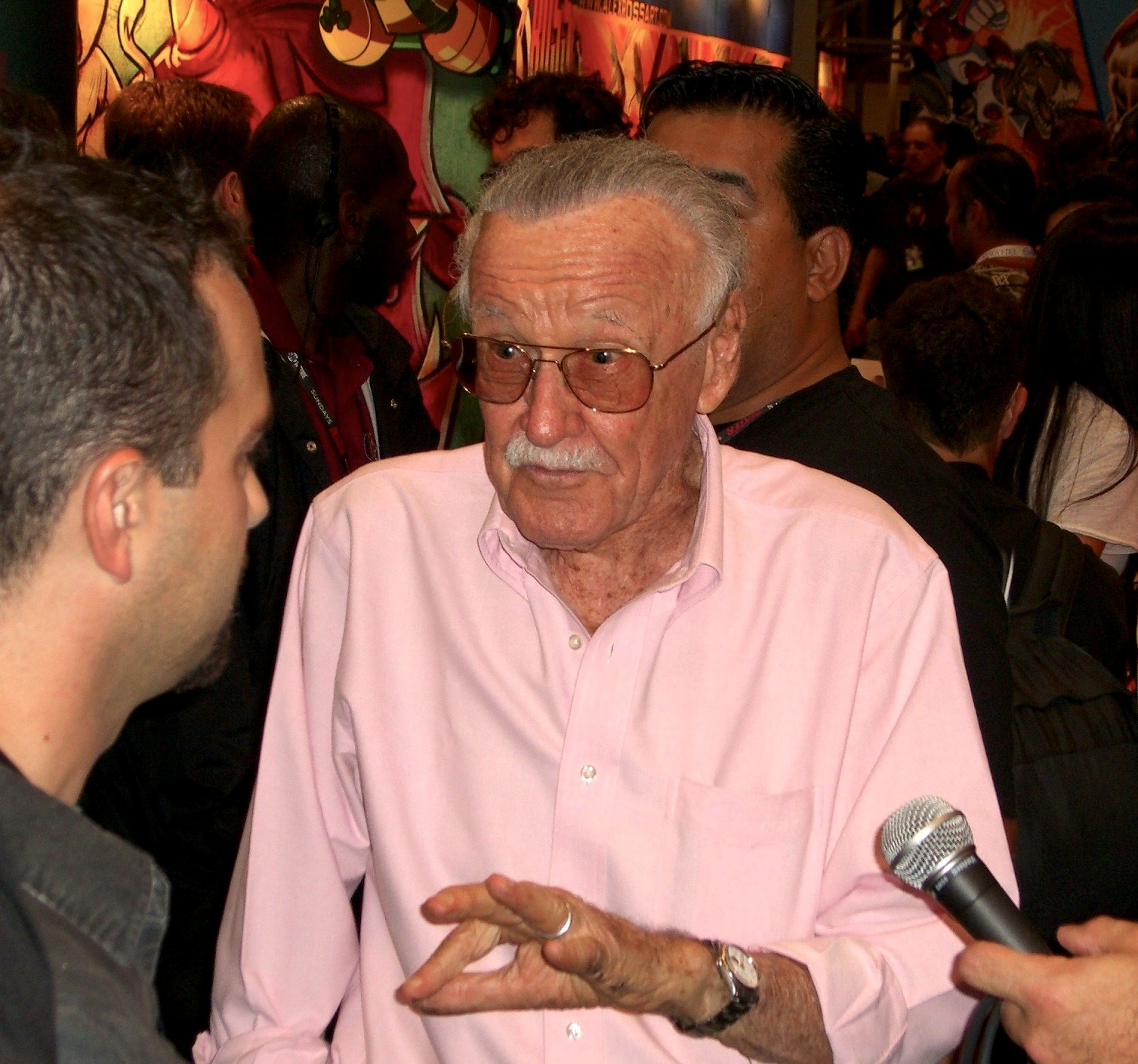
Lee promoting Stan Lee's Kids Universe at the 2011 New York Comic Con

In October 2011, Lee announced he would partner with 1821 Comics on a multimedia imprint, Stan Lee's Kids Universe, a move he said addressed the lack of comic books targeted at children; and that he was collaborating with the company on its futuristic graphic novel Romeo & Juliet: The War, by writer Max Work and artist Skan Srisuwan. At the 2012 San Diego Comic-Con, Lee announced his YouTube channel, Stan Lee's World of Heroes, which airs programs created by Lee, Mark Hamill, Peter David, Adrianne Curry and Bonnie Burton, among others. Lee wrote the book Zodiac, released in January 2015, with Stuart Moore. The film Stan Lee's Annihilator, based on a Chinese prisoner-turned-superhero named Ming and in production since 2013, was released in 2015.

In 2008, POW! Entertainment debuted the manga series Karakuri Dôji Ultimo, a collaboration between Lee and Hiroyuki Takei, Viz Media and Shueisha, The following year POW! released Heroman, which was written by Lee, and serialized in Square Enix's Monthly Shōnen Gangan with the Japanese company Bones. In 2011, Lee started writing a live-action musical, The Yin and Yang Battle of Tao, and created the limited series Blood Red Dragon, a collaboration with Todd McFarlane and Japanese rock star Yoshiki.

The 2000s saw Lee's public persona penetrate the public consciousness through merchandising, branding, and appearances in Marvel books as a character in the Marvel Universe. In 2006, Marvel commemorated Lee's 65 years with the company by publishing a series of one-shot comics starring Lee himself meeting and interacting with many of his co-creations, including Spider-Man, Doctor Strange, the Thing, Silver Surfer, and Doctor Doom. These comics also featured short pieces by such comics creators as Joss Whedon and Fred Hembeck, as well as reprints of classic Lee-written adventures. At the 2007 Comic-Con International, Marvel Legends introduced a Stan Lee action figure. The body beneath the figure's removable cloth wardrobe is a reused mold of a previously released Spider-Man action figure, with minor changes. Comikaze Expo, Los Angeles' largest comic book convention, was rebranded as Stan Lee's Comikaze Presented by POW! Entertainment in 2012.

At the 2016 Comic-Con International, Lee introduced his digital graphic novel Stan Lee's God Woke, with text originally written as a poem he presented at Carnegie Hall in 1972. The print-book version won the 2017 Independent Publisher Book Awards' Outstanding Books of the Year Independent Voice Award.

On July 6, 2020, Genius Brands (now Kartoon Studios) acquired exclusive worldwide rights to use Lee's name, physical likeness, and signature as well as licensing rights to his name and original IPs from POW! Entertainment. The assets will be placed under a new joint-venture with POW!, called Stan Lee Universe. In 2022, Marvel signed a licensing deal with Stan Lee Universe to use Lee's name and likeness in film and television projects, as well as attractions and merchandising. In April 2024, Kartoon Studios, in collaboration with Channel Frederator Network, rebranded their live-action channel as Stan Lee Presents under the management of Ethan Schulteis. The channel now focuses on Stan Lee's legacy, featuring content from his personal archives, digital comic books, interviews, behind-the-scenes footage, and previews of upcoming projects.

== Personal life ==
=== Marriage and residences ===
From 1945 to 1947, Lee lived in the rented top floor of a brownstone in the East 90s in Manhattan. He married Joan Clayton Boocock, originally from Newcastle, England, on December 5, 1947, and in 1949, the couple bought a house in Woodmere, New York, on Long Island, living there through 1952. Their daughter Joan Celia "J. C." Lee was born in 1950. Another daughter, Jan Lee, died a few days after her birth in 1953.

The Lees resided in the Long Island community of Hewlett Harbor, New York, from 1952 to 1980. They also owned a condominium on East 63rd Street in Manhattan from 1975 to 1980, and during the 1970s, they owned a vacation home in Remsenburg, New York. For their move to the West Coast in 1981, they bought a home in West Hollywood, California, previously owned by comedian Jack Benny's radio announcer Don Wilson.

=== Philanthropy ===
The Stan Lee Foundation was founded in 2010 to focus on literacy, education, and the arts. Its stated goals include supporting programs and ideas that improve access to literacy resources, as well as promoting diversity, national literacy, culture, and the arts.

Lee regularly donated papers, photographs, recordings, and personal effects to the American Heritage Center at the University of Wyoming between 1981 and 2011. They cover the period from 1926 to 2011.

=== Legal concerns ===
==== Intellectual property ====
In 2017, POW! was acquired by Camsing International, a Chinese company, during the period Lee was caring for his terminally ill wife and dealing with his own failing eyesight. Lee filed a US$1 billion lawsuit against POW! in May 2018, asserting that POW! had not disclosed the terms of its acquisition by Camsing to him. Lee stated that POW! CEO Shane Duffy and co-founder Gill Champion had presented him with what they said was a non-exclusive license for POW! for him to sign, under Camsing, to use his likeness and other intellectual property. This contract turned out to be an exclusive license, which Lee claimed he would never have entered into.

Lee's lawsuit contended that POW! took over his social media accounts and was impersonating him inappropriately. POW! considered these complaints without merit and claimed that both Lee and his daughter J.C. were aware of the terms. The lawsuit was dropped in July 2018, with Lee issuing the statement: "The whole thing has been confusing to everyone, including myself and the fans, but I am now happy to be surrounded by those who want the best for me" and saying that he was happy to be working with POW! again.

Following Lee's death, his daughter J.C. gathered a legal team to review the legal situation relating to Lee's intellectual property from his later years. In September 2019, J.C. filed a new lawsuit against POW! in the United States District Court for the Central District of California not only related to recent events but also to regain the intellectual property rights that Lee had set up when founding Stan Lee Entertainment in 1998. The complaint identified a period between 2001 and 2017 during which Lee's partners Gill Champion and Arthur Lieberman were said to have misled Lee about various intellectual property rights deals.

In June 2020, Judge Otis D. Wright II dismissed J.C. Lee's lawsuit against POW! Entertainment, declaring it "frivolous" and "improper", sanctioning J.C. Lee for $1,000,000, and sanctioning her lawyers for $250,000 severally. The court also gave POW! Entertainment the right to make a motion to recover legal fees. "We feel vindicated by the Court's decision today," said POW! in a statement. "Stan purposefully created POW! eighteen years ago with me as a place to safeguard his life's work. Before he passed, Stan was adamant that POW! continue to protect his creations and his identity after he was gone, because he trusted that we would safeguard his legacy for generations to come."

==== Sexual harassment allegations ====
On January 10, 2018, the Mail Online alleged that Lee was accused by a small number of nurses of sexually harassing them at his home in early 2017. Lee denied the allegations and claimed that the nurses were attempting to extort him.

==== Victim of elder abuse ====
In April 2018, The Hollywood Reporter published a report that claimed Lee was a victim of elder abuse; the report asserted that, among others, Keya Morgan, Lee's business manager and a memorabilia collector, had been isolating Lee from his trusted friends and associates following his wife's death in order to obtain access to Lee's wealth, estimated to amount to US$50 million. In August 2018, a restraining order was issued against Morgan to stay away from Lee, his daughter, and his associates for three years. The Los Angeles Superior Court confirmed that Morgan was charged in May 2019 with five counts of abuse for events that had occurred in mid-2018. The charges were false imprisonment, grand theft of an elder or dependent adult, fraud, forgery, and elder abuse.

Another figure in the alleged abuse was Lee's former business manager, Jerardo Olivarez, who was introduced to Lee by J.C. after his wife's death. Lee filed suit against Olivarez in April 2018, calling him one of several "unscrupulous businessmen, sycophants and opportunists" that approached him during this period. According to Lee's complaint, after gaining Lee's power of attorney, Olivarez fired Lee's personal banker, changed Lee's will, convinced him to allow transfers of millions of dollars from his accounts and used some of the funds to purchase a condominium.

== Later life and death ==
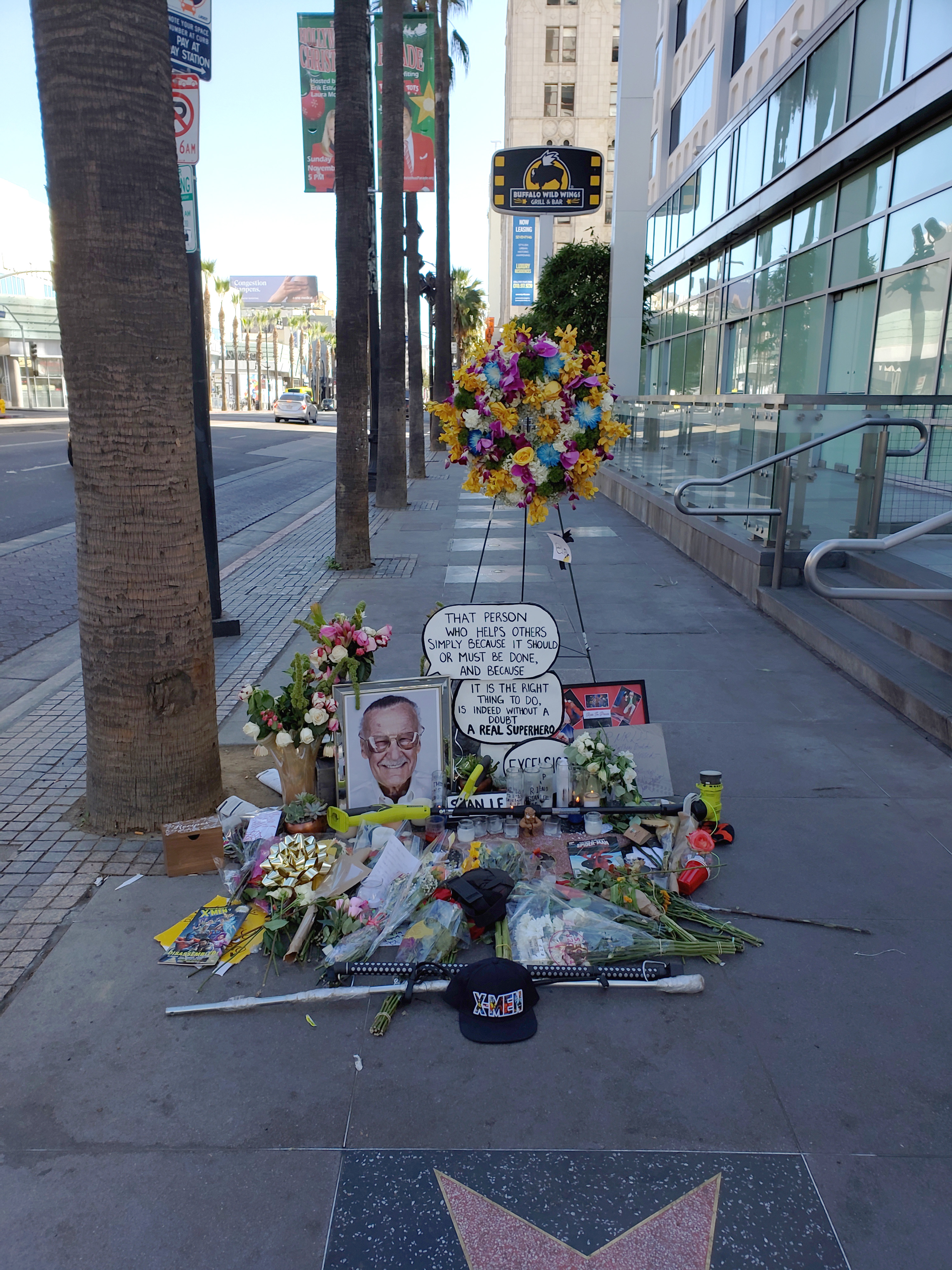
Memorial to Lee at his star on the Hollywood Walk of Fame, taken two days after his death

In September 2012, Lee underwent an operation to insert a pacemaker, which required cancelling planned appearances at conventions. Lee eventually retired from convention appearances by 2017.

On July 6, 2017, Joan Boocock, his wife of 69 years, died of complications from a stroke. She was 95 years old.

Lee died on November 12, 2018, at Cedars-Sinai Medical Center in Los Angeles, after being rushed there for a medical emergency earlier in the day. Lee had previously been hospitalized for pneumonia in February of that year. The immediate cause of death listed on his death certificate was cardiac arrest with respiratory failure and congestive heart failure as underlying causes. It also indicated that he suffered from aspiration pneumonia. His body was cremated and his ashes were given to his daughter.

Roy Thomas, who succeeded Lee as editor-in-chief at Marvel, had visited Lee two days prior to his death to discuss the upcoming book The Stan Lee Story and stated "I think he was ready to go. But he was still talking about doing more cameos. As long as he had the energy for it and didn't have to travel, Stan was always up to do some more cameos. He got a kick out of those more than anything else." Lee's last words to Thomas was "God bless. Take care of my boy, Roy", leading fans to speculate that he was referring to Spider-Man. However, Lee had long before nick-named Thomas as Roy "the Boy" Thomas, in line with the way Lee sometimes styled himself as Stan "the Man" Lee.

== Bibliography ==
=== Books ===
- Lee, Stan; Mair, George (2002). Excelsior!: The Amazing Life of Stan Lee. Simon & Schuster. ISBN 978-0-7432-2800-8.
- Lee, Stan (1997) [Originally published by Simon & Schuster in 1974]. Origins of Marvel Comics. Marvel Entertainment Group. ISBN 978-0-7851-0551-0.
- Lee, Stan; David, Peter (2015). Amazing, Fantastic, Incredible: A Marvelous Memoir. Simon & Schuster. ISBN 978-1501107771.

=== Comics bibliography ===
Lee's comics work includes:

==== DC Comics ====
- DC Comics Presents: Superman #1 (2004)
- Detective Comics #600 (1989, text piece)
- Just Imagine Stan Lee creating:
  - Aquaman (with Scott McDaniel) (2002)
  - Batman (with Joe Kubert) (2001)
  - Catwoman (with Chris Bachalo) (2002)
  - Crisis (with John Cassaday) (2002)
  - Flash (with Kevin Maguire) (2002)
  - Green Lantern (with Dave Gibbons) (2001)
  - JLA (with Jerry Ordway) (2002)
  - Robin (with John Byrne) (2001)
  - Sandman (with Walt Simonson) (2002)
  - Secret Files and Origins (2002)
  - Shazam! (with Gary Frank) (2001)
  - Superman (with John Buscema) (2001)
  - Wonder Woman (with Jim Lee) (2001)

==== Marvel Comics ====
- The Amazing Spider-Man #1–100, 105–110, 116–118 (co-written with Gerry Conway), Annual #1–5 (1963-1973); #200 (epilogue), Annual #18 (1980, 1984); (backup stories): #634–645 (2010–2011)
- The Amazing Spider-Man, strips (1977–2018)
- The Avengers #1–34 (1963–1966)
- Captain America #100–141 (1968–1971) (continues from Tales of Suspense #99)
- Daredevil, #1–9, 11–50, 53 (story), Annual #1 (1964–1969)
- Daredevil, vol. 2, #20 (backup story) (2001)
- Epic Illustrated #1 (Silver Surfer) (1980)
- Fantastic Four #1–114, 115 (plot), 120–125, Annual #1–6 (1961–1972); #296 (1986)
- The Incredible Hulk #1–6 (1962–1963) (continues to Tales to Astonish #59)
- The Incredible Hulk, vol. 2, #108–119, 120 (plot) (1968–1969)
- Journey into Mystery (Thor) plotter #83–96 (1962–1963), writer #97–125, Annual #1 (1963–1966) (continues to Thor #126)
- The Mighty Thor #126–192, 200, Annual #1–2, 4 (1966–1972), 385 (1987)
- Kissnation #1 (1996)
- Nightcat #1 (1991)
- Ravage 2099 #1–7 (1992–1993)
- Savage She-Hulk #1 (1980)
- Savage Tales #1 (1971)
- Sgt. Fury and his Howling Commandos #1–28, Annual #1 (1963–1966)
- Silver Surfer #1–18 (1968–1970)
- Silver Surfer, vol. 2, #1 (1982)
- Silver Surfer: Judgment Day (1988) ISBN 978-0-87135-427-3
- Silver Surfer: Parable #1–2 (1988–1989)
- Silver Surfer: The Enslavers (1990) ISBN 978-0-87135-617-8
- Solarman #1–2 (1989–1990)
- The Spectacular Spider-Man (magazine) #1–2 (1968)
- The Spectacular Spider-Man Annual #10 (1990)
- Strange Tales (diverse stories): #9, 11, 74, 89, 90–100 (1951–1962); (Human Torch): #101–109, 112–133, Annual #2; (Doctor Strange): #110–111, 115–128, 130-142, 151–157 (1963–1967); Nick Fury, Agent of S.H.I.E.L.D.: #135–147, 150–152 (1965–1967)
- Tales to Astonish (diverse stories): #1, 6, 12–13, 15–17, 24–33 (1959–1962); Ant-Man/Giant Man: #35–69 (1962–1965); The Hulk: #59–101 (1964–1968); Sub-Mariner: #70–101 (1965–1968)
- Tales of Suspense (diverse stories): #7, 9, 16, 22, 27, 29–30 (1959–1962); (Iron Man): plotter #39–46 (1963), writer #47–98 (1963–1968) (Captain America): #59–86, 88–99 (1964–1968)
- Web of Spider-Man Annual #6 (1990)
- What If (Fantastic Four) #200 (2011)
- The X-Men #1–19 (1963–1966)

==== Simon and Schuster ====
- The Silver Surfer: The Ultimate Cosmic Experience, 114 pages, September 1978, ISBN 978-0-671-24225-1

==== Other ====
- Heroman
- How to Draw Comics the Marvel Way
- Karakuri Dôji Ultimo (manga original concept)
- Adventures of the Big Boy (Writer of early comic strips.)

== Accolades ==
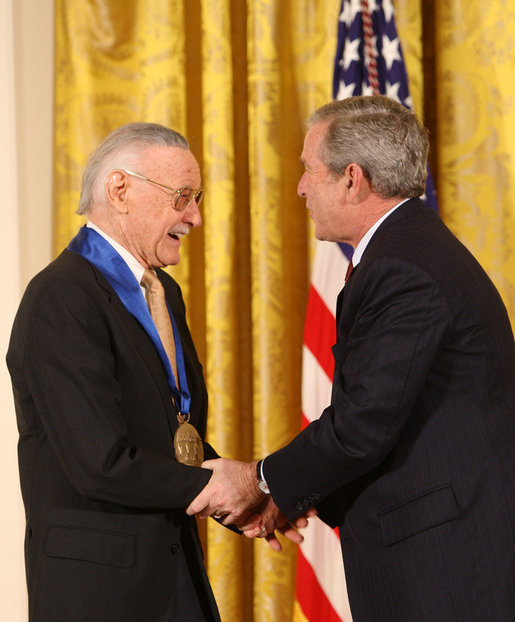
Stan Lee is congratulated by President George W. Bush on receiving the National Medal of Arts in 2008

- The County of Los Angeles and the City of Long Beach declared October 2, 2009, "Stan Lee Day".
- Boston's Mayor Marty Walsh named August 2, 2015, as "Stan Lee Day" for the city during the annual Boston Comic-Con event.
- The office of New York City Mayor Bill de Blasio announced that October 7, 2016, was "Stan Lee Day" for the city during the New York Comic Con event.
- At the onset of the 2016 Stan Lee's Comikaze Expo in Los Angeles, the Los Angeles City Council announced that October 28, 2016, was "Stan Lee Day".
- On July 14, 2017, Lee and Jack Kirby were named Disney Legends for their creation of numerous characters that later comprised Disney's Marvel Cinematic Universe.
- On July 18, 2017, as part of D23 Disney Legends event, a ceremony was held at the TCL Chinese Theatre on Hollywood Boulevard where Stan Lee imprinted his hands, feet, and signature in cement.
- The New York City Council voted on July 23, 2019, to name a section of University Avenue in the Bronx, between Brandt Place and West 176th Street, as "Stan Lee Way".

| Year | Award | Nominated work | Result |
|---|---|---|---|
| 1974 | Inkpot Award | | Won |
| 1994 | The Will Eisner Award Hall of Fame | | Won |
| 1995 | Jack Kirby Hall of Fame | | Won |
| 2002 | Saturn Award | The Life Career Award | Won |
| 2007 | Sergio Award | | Won |
| 2008 | National Medal of Arts | | Won |
| 2009 | Hugo Award | Hugo Award for Best Dramatic Presentation- Iron Man | Nominated |
| 2009 | Scream Awards | Comic-Con Icon Award | Won |
| 2011 | Hollywood Walk of Fame | | Won |
| 2012 | Visual Effects Society Awards | Lifetime Achievement Award | Won |
| 2012 | Producers Guild of America | Vanguard Award | Won |
| 2017 | National Academy of Video Game Trade Reviewers | Performance in a Comedy, Supporting | Won |

== Fictional portrayals ==
=== Marvel Comics ===
Stan Lee appears in one panel as "third assistant office boy" in Terry-Toons #12 (September 1943). Stan Lee is featured prominently as a story character in Margie #36 (June 1947).

He later appears in a mask on the cover of Black Rider #8 (March 1950), albeit as a character model, not as Stan Lee.

Lee and Kirby (bottom left) as themselves on the cover of The Fantastic Four #10 (January 1963). Art by Kirby and Dick Ayers

Lee and Jack Kirby appear as themselves in The Fantastic Four #10 (January 1963), the first of several appearances within the fictional Marvel Universe. The two are depicted as similar to their real-world counterparts, creating comic books based on the "real" adventures of the Fantastic Four.

Kirby later portrayed himself, Lee, production executive Sol Brodsky, and Lee's secretary Flo Steinberg as superheroes in What If #11 (October 1978), "What If the Marvel Bullpen Had Become the Fantastic Four?", in which Lee played the role of Mister Fantastic.

Lee was shown in numerous cameo appearances in many Marvel titles, appearing in audiences and crowds at many characters' ceremonies and parties. For example, he is seen hosting an old-soldiers reunion in Sgt. Fury and his Howling Commandos #100 (July 1972), in The Amazing Spider-Man #169 (June 1977), as a bar patron in Marvels #3 (1994), at Karen Page's funeral in Daredevil vol. 2, #8 (June 1998), and as the priest officiating at Luke Cage and Jessica Jones' wedding in New Avengers Annual #1 (June 2006). Lee and Kirby appear as professors in Marvel Adventures Spider-Man #19 (2006).

He appears in Generation X #17 (July 1996) as a circus ringmaster narrating (in lines written by Lee) a story set in an abandoned circus. This characterization was revived in Marvel's "Flashback" series of titles cover-dated July 1997, numbered "-1", introducing stories about Marvel characters before they became superheroes.

In Stan Lee Meets Superheroes (2007), written by Lee, he comes into contact with some of his favorite creations.

=== DC Comics ===
In the first series of Angel and the Ape (1968–1969), Lee was parodied as Stan Bragg, editor of Brain-Pix Comics.

Lee was parodied by Kirby in Mister Miracle in the early 1970s as Funky Flashman.

A humorously illustrated Lee briefly appears in Teen Titans Go! To the Movies. The character is depicted in a cameo before being informed by another character that it is a DC film. Despite DC Comics being a competitor, Lee himself actually provides the voice for the character.

=== Other publishers ===
Lee and other comics creators are mentioned in Michael Chabon's 2000 novel, set in the early comics industry, The Amazing Adventures of Kavalier & Clay.

Under the name Stanley Lieber, he appears briefly in Paul Malmont's 2006 novel The Chinatown Death Cloud Peril.

In Lavie Tidhar's 2013 The Violent Century, Lee appears – as Stanley Martin Lieber – as a historian of superhumans.

== Film and television appearances ==
Lee had cameo appearances in many Marvel film and television projects, including those within the Marvel Cinematic Universe. A few of these appearances are self-aware and sometimes reference Lee's involvement in the creation of certain characters. He additionally voiced a cameo appearance as himself in the 2018 DC Comics movie Teen Titans Go! To the Movies. Out of respect for Lee, Marvel Studios enacted a new policy following his death that forbids cameos by Lee in new films by using archive footage of him, with Avengers: Endgame (2019) marking his final appearance; the film was released several months after his death.

Lee was featured with his colleagues and family in the 2010 documentary With Great Power: The Stan Lee Story, which explored his life, career, and creations. A special titled Stan Lee, chronicling the life and legacy of Lee, was released on June 16, 2023, on Disney+. It was directed by David Gelb and premiered at the Tribeca Festival.

== See also ==
- List of American comics creators
- Lists of American Jews
- List of Eisner Award winners
- List of Harvey Award winners
- List of Jewish American authors
- List of Marvel Comics people
- List of pseudonyms
- List of science-fiction authors
- With great power comes great responsibility

== Explanatory notes ==
Business positions
| Preceded by Martin Goodman | Publisher of Marvel Comics; 1972–1996 | Succeeded by Shirrel Rhoades |
| Preceded by Joe Simon | Marvel Comics editor-in-chief 1941–1942 | Succeeded by Vincent Fago |
| Preceded by Vincent Fago | Marvel Comics editor-in-chief 1945–1972 | Succeeded by Roy Thomas |
| Preceded by n/a | Fantastic Four writer 1961–1971 | Succeeded by Archie Goodwin |
| Preceded by Archie Goodwin | Fantastic Four writer 1972 | Succeeded by Roy Thomas |
| Preceded by n/a | The Amazing Spider-Man writer 1962–1971 | Succeeded by Roy Thomas |
| Preceded by Roy Thomas | The Amazing Spider-Man writer 1972–1973 | Succeeded by Gerry Conway |
| Preceded by n/a | The Incredible Hulk writer (including Tales to Astonish stories); 1962–1968 | Succeeded by Gary Friedrich |
| Preceded by Gary Friedrich | The Incredible Hulk writer 1968–1969 | Succeeded by Roy Thomas |
| Preceded by n/a | Thor writer (including Journey into Mystery stories); 1962–1971 (with Larry Lieber in 1962) (with Robert Bernstein in 1963) | Succeeded by Gerry Conway |
| Preceded by n/a | The Avengers writer 1963–1966 | Succeeded by Roy Thomas |
| Preceded by n/a | (Uncanny) X-Men writer 1963–1966 | Succeeded by Roy Thomas |
| Preceded by n/a | Captain America writer (including Tales of Suspense stories); 1964–1971 | Succeeded by Gary Friedrich |
| Preceded by n/a | Daredevil writer 1964–1969 | Succeeded by Roy Thomas |
