= Walnuts & Rain =

- Adventure Time episode
- Episode no.: Season 6 Episode 31
- Directed by: Andres Salaff (Note: Supervising director); Nick Jennings (Note: Art director)
- Written by: Tom Herpich
- Story by: Tom Herpich; Adam Muto; Kent Osborne; Jack Pendarvis; Pendleton Ward
- Production code: 1025-193
- Original air date: March 5, 2015
- Running time: 11 minutes

Guest appearances
- Chris Isaak as Seven; Matt L. Jones as King Huge

Episode chronology
← Previous "The Diary"	Next → "Friends Forever"
- Adventure Time season 6

"Walnuts & Rain" is the thirty-first episode of the sixth season of the American animated television series Adventure Time. The episode was written and storyboarded by Tom Herpich, from an outline by Herpich, Adam Muto, Kent Osborne, Jack Pendarvis, and Pendleton Ward. The episode debuted on March 5, 2015 on Cartoon Network, and guest stars Chris Isaak as a bear named Seven and Matt L. Jones as King Huge.

The series follows the adventures of Finn (voiced by Jeremy Shada), a human boy, and his best friend and adoptive brother Jake (voiced by John DiMaggio), a dog with magical powers to change shape and grow and shrink at will. In this episode, Finn and Jake stumble into two different holes and meet two different fates: Finn becomes the guest of the unstable King Huge (voiced by Jones), who insists that Finn remain with him and stare at his idiosyncratic cuckoo clock; whereas Jake meets Seven (voiced by Isaak), a bear whose makeshift air raft has been falling down the hole for years. Eventually, it turns out that the hole Jake and Seven are falling through is the chimney to the kitchen where Finn is being held captive. As such, Jake is eventually able to save Finn.

"Walnuts & Rain" marked the first time that Herpich had solo-storyboarded an episode since the third season episode "Thank You". The episode was seen by 1.68 million viewers, and received mixed reviews from critics; while Andrew Tran of Overmental enjoyed the allegories in the episode, Oliver Sava of The A.V. Club somewhat critically compared "Walnuts & Rain" to episodes from the show's first and second seasons. For his work on the episode, Herpich won a Primetime Emmy Award for Outstanding Individual Achievement in Animation; this was the series's third win in the category. For his work on this episode, Herpich was later nominated for an Annie Award for Outstanding Achievement, Storyboarding in an Animated TV/Broadcast Production in 2016.

== Plot ==
While wandering in the woods, Finn and Jake fall down two separate holes. Finn lands in the Kingdom of Huge, where he is greeted by its sovereign, King Huge. The king lavishes Finn with food and asks that he stay and watch the chiming of his cuckoo clock. However, it soon becomes apparent that King Huge is insane; he demands that Finn remain and watch every time the clock chimes the hour. Meanwhile, Jake lands on the barge of a bear named Seven. According to Seven, the barge has been falling for years, and he warns Jake not to try and escape, lest he die.

Eventually, Finn has enough, and knocks the king's clock from the wall. It crashes into the kingdom's huge stove, knocking over a pot of water. The water puts out the fire, which causes the warm updraft going into the chimney to cease; this updraft was actually holding Seven's barge in stasis all of this time. The barge comes crashing down into the kingdom, and Jake uses his stretching powers to save Finn. Thence, Finn, Jake, and Seven escape.

== Production ==
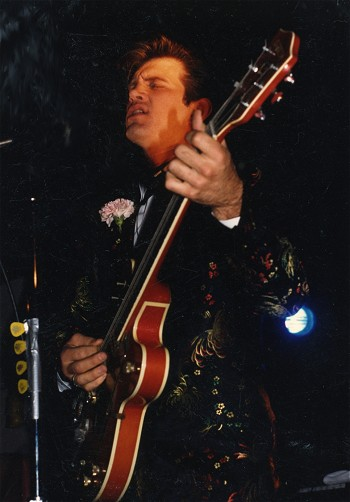
The episode guest stars Chris Isaak as a bear named Seven.

"Walnuts & Rain" was written and Storyboarded by Tom Herpich, from an outline by head Adventure Time writer Kent Osborne, series creator Pendleton Ward, Jack Pendarvis, showrunner Adam Muto, and Herpich. Andres Salaff served as the episode's supervising director, while the art direction was helmed by Nick Jennings. The episode marks Herpich's first solo storyboard since season three's 'Thank You". Near the latter part of season six, Herpich and has storyboard partner Steve Wolfhard each had episode ideas that they wanted to work on. The two decided to temporarily dissolve their partnership and work on episodes individually (Wolfhard would go on to create "Graybles 1000+"). Herpich had been working on the outline for "Walnuts & Rain" on and off for several months before he finally storyboarded it, and he would later describe the episode as an "allegorical escape story", similar to the season five episodes "Puhoy" and "Dungeon Train". This episode guest stars musician Chris Isaak as Seven, and Matt L. Jones as King Huge. Jones had previously appeared in the first season episode "Memories of Boom Boom Mountain" voicing the crying Mountain.

== Reception ==
"Walnuts & Rain" first aired on March 5, 2015 on Cartoon Network. The episode was viewed by 1.68 million viewers and scored a 0.24 Nielsen rating in the 18- to 49-year-old demographic. Nielsen ratings are audience measurement systems that determine the audience size and composition of television programming in the United States, which means that the episode was seen by 0.24 percent of all households aged 18 to 49 years old were watching television at the time of the episode's airing.

Critical reception to the episode was largely mixed. Oliver Sava of The A.V. Club awarded the episode a "C+" and called it "disappointing". Despite noting that it is "a totally serviceable episode of Adventure Time", he argued that the episode felt too much like an episode from the show's first or second seasons, when installments were often lacking in depth and a bit more uneven across the board. He noted that, "Tonight's episode is for the kids. It's simple and easy to follow, and doesn't contain any unsettling imagery … but that also prevents it from being especially memorable." Ultimately, he felt that the show's returned fixation on Finn and Jake proved that the expansion of the show's universe was "the best thing that could have happened to it."

Andrew Tran of the website Overmental, on the other hand, reacted more positively to the episode. He felt that both King Huge and Seven were representative of a stagnation in mindset; according to him, they are both stuck in their ways and unwilling to change. However, he notes that the two also differ substantially. Tran argues that King Huge has legions of slaves feeding him the richest of foods. He is comfortable, but unaccustomed to dealing with outsiders, which expresses itself as xenophobia. Seven, on the other hand, lives in abject poverty, and is much more welcoming of strangers. In the end, Seven escapes the episode unscathed, and according to Tran, the moral of the episode is that "the bright side of a crap situation is that [the situation] pushes rather than restricts, enriches rather than fattens."

For his work on this episode, Herpich won a Primetime Emmy Award for Outstanding Individual Achievement in Animation, making it the series's third win in this category. (Note: Adventure Time staffers Andy Ristaino and Nick Jennings had previously won this reward in 2013 and 2014, respectively.) Herpich was later nominated for an Annie Award for Outstanding Achievement, Storyboarding in an Animated TV/Broadcast Production in 2016.

== See also ==
- "Hall of Egress", the third episode that Tom Herpich storyboarded solo
