= Hot Diggity Doom and The Comet =

2015 episodes of Adventure Time

- Adventure Time episodes
- Jake vs. Orgalorg (Gunter)
- Episode nos.: Season 6 Episodes 42 and 43
- Directed by: Andres Salaff (Note: Supervising director, "Hot Diggity Doom"); Elizabeth Ito (Note: Supervising director, "The Comet"); Nick Jennings (Note: Art co-director); Sandra Lee
- Written by: Tom Herpich (Note: Storyboard artist, "Hot Diggity Doom"); Steve Wolfhard; Jesse Moynihan (Note: Storyboard artist, "The Comet"); Andy Ristaino
- Story by: Kent Osborne; Pendleton Ward; Jack Pendarvis; Adam Muto
- Production codes: 1025-203; 1025-200
- Original air date: June 5, 2015
- Running time: 22 min.

Episode chronology
← Previous "On The Lam"	Next → "Bonnie and Neddy"

"Hot Diggity Doom" and "The Comet" are the final two episodes of the sixth season of the American animated television series Adventure Time. "Hot Diggity Doom" was written and storyboarded by Tom Herpich and Steve Wolfhard, and "The Comet" was written and storyboarded by Jesse Moynihan and Andy Ristaino. Both episodes' stories were developed by Pendleton Ward, Adam Muto, Kent Osborne, and Jack Pendarvis. The two episodes originally aired on Cartoon Network on June 5, 2015. As part of a 5 night event called the #FINNALE which aired the final episodes of Season 6. They are: You Forgot Your Floaties, Be Sweet, Orgalorg, On The Lam, and the 2 part finale.

== Plot ==
=== "Hot Diggity Doom" ===
Election day has come to the Candy Kingdom, but Princess Bubblegum (voiced by Hynden Walch) is distracted by the Catalyst Comet, a sentient comet that approaches Earth every 1,000 years. Her distraction with the comet causes her position as princess to be taken over by the King of Ooo (voiced by Andy Daly), a king made of earwax. This causes Princess Bubblegum and her second-in-command, Peppermint Butler, to retreat to an old cabin where Bubblegum used to spend her childhood days. (She later regains control over the kingdom in the Stakes miniseries.) Meanwhile, Gunter the penguin has just awakened his true form, a malevolent alien demon named Orgalorg in the events of a previous episode, "Orgalorg". Orgalorg uses one of Bubblegum's spaceships to blast off into space and absorb the comet's energy to gain its power and take over the universe.

=== "The Comet" ===
Finn (voiced by Jeremy Shada) and Jake (voiced by John DiMaggio) blast off into space to stop Orgalorg. While wearing spacesuits, Finn and Jake go out to stop it but are separated. Finn goes inside of Orgalorg's large body, wherein his arm turns into a giant grass blade, which is one of his powers, and begins ripping the comet to shreds. After doing this he finds a strange circular-shaped being (voiced by Tig Notaro) living inside the comet. The being tells Finn that since he was a Catalyst Comet in a past life, he can have all the power he wants and ascend to a higher plane of being. Finn politely declines, saying he wants to stay on Earth. At that moment, Finn's deadbeat father Martin (voiced by Stephen Root) approaches them in the mouth of a giant space moth. He decides to take up on the comet's offer, and the both of them disappear. Finn and Jake are then rescued by Banana Man, and they return to Earth. A now critically injured Orgalorg falls down to Earth as well, turning back into the powerless Gunter.

== Reception ==
The episodes received widespread acclaim from critics and audiences alike. The A.V. Club listed "The Comet" as one of the best TV episodes of 2015, saying "(the episode) explores randomness versus intention, but it never loses sight of the pathos or humor of Finn's saga." TVOverMind described the last episode "On The Lam" as average, but stated these two episodes were "amazingly existential".
