= Dentist (Adventure Time) =

- Adventure Time episode
- Episode no.: Season 6 Episode 21
- Directed by: Andres Salaff (Note: Supervising director); Nick Jennings (Note: Art director)
- Written by: Tom Herpich; Steve Wolfhard
- Story by: Tom Herpich; Adam Muto; Kent Osborne; Jack Pendarvis; Pendleton Ward; Steve Wolfhard
- Production code: 1025-188
- Original air date: November 28, 2014
- Running time: 11 minutes

Guest appearances
- Lucy Lawless as Gen. Tarsal; Collin Dean as Tiffany; Andy Daly as Lt. Gamergate

Episode chronology
← Previous "Jake the Brick"	Next → "The Cooler"
- Adventure Time season 6

"Dentist" is the twenty-first episode of the sixth season of the American animated television series Adventure Time. The episode was written and storyboarded by Tom Herpich and Steve Wolfhard, from an outline by Herpich, Wolfhard, Adam Muto, Kent Osborne, Jack Pendarvis, and Pendleton Ward. The episode debuted on November 28, 2014 and guest stars Lucy Lawless, Collin Dean, and Andy Daly.

The series follows the adventures of Finn (voiced by Jeremy Shada), a human boy, and his best friend and adoptive brother Jake (voiced by John DiMaggio), a dog with magical powers to change shape and grow and shrink at will. In this episode, Finn has a tooth ache, so he visits the dentist, a group of ants led by General Tarsal (voiced by Lucy Lawless), who provide dental care in exchange for a tour of duty. However, Finn soon finds himself partnered up with Tiffany (voiced by Collin Dean), who constantly tries to kill him so that he may become Jake's best friend.

Wolfhard had originally developed the premise for "Dentist" before he abandoned it. The episode idea was then substantially revised by Herpich. Upon its airing, it was seen by 1.40 million viewers, and received mixed reviews from critics. It was also the subject of a minor controversy, because one of the characters in the episode is named Lt. Gamergate (in reference to a type of ant). Some fans mistook this to be a reference to the Gamergate controversy.

== Plot ==
After one of Finn's teeth starts to ache, he agrees to "go [sic] Dentist", which is later revealed to not be a single doctor of dental surgery, but a colony of ants led by Gen. Tarsal (voiced by Lucy Lawless). They explain that if Finn agrees to serve a brief tour of duty and fight against evil worms, they will fix his teeth. Finn agrees, and is partnered with Tiffany (voiced by Collin Dean), a former friend of Jake's. Tiffany openly plots to kill Finn so that he might usurp the title of Jake's best friend. Eventually, the worms attack, and Finn and Tiffany are forced to work together. In the resulting melee, Tiffany is apparently killed by the Queen Worm, and Finn shatters all of his teeth, but they are promptly fixed by the ants.

== Production ==
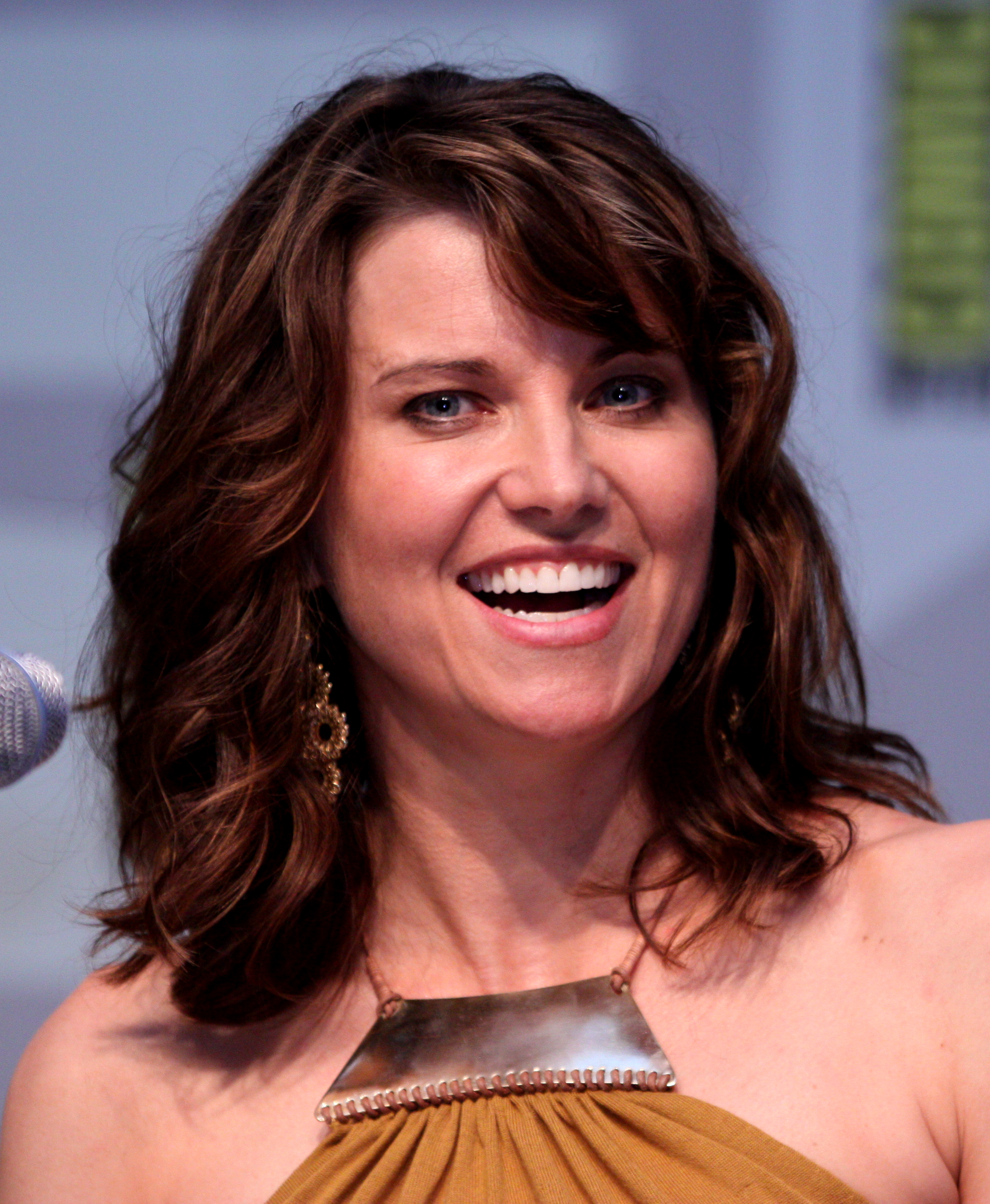
The episode guest stars Lucy Lawless as General Tarsal.

"Dentist" was written and storyboarded by Tom Herpich and Steve Wolfhard, from a story by Kent Osborne, series creator Pendleton Ward, Jack Pendarvis, Adam Muto, Herpich, and Wolfhard. The original premise for "Dentist" had been developed solely by Wolfhard, who explained on his blog: "['Dentist'] is a weird one that's been kicking around for a while! It's an idea that I initially came up with but it was a real mess. It was too complicated, it didn't have an ending, and it had a miniature Finn, and sentient mushrooms, and death, and Mr. Fox." Dissatisfied with his idea, he abandoned it, but Herpich rewrote the premise completely, and "made it work".

Wolfhard originally storyboarded a scene explaining the origin for hostilities between the ants and the flies, but it was later cut from the episode; the official Adventure Time production blog later released this "deleted scene" online. The episode guest stars Lucy Lawless as General Tarsal, Andy Daly as Lt. Gamergate, and Collin Dean as Tiffany; Daly had previously voiced the king of Ooo in fifth season episode "Apple Wedding", and Dean had provided the voice of Tiffany in the episode "One Last Job".

== Reception ==
"Dentist" debuted on November 28, 2014 on Cartoon Network. The episode was seen by 1.398 million viewers, and received a 0.3 rating in the 18–49 demographic. This means it was seen by 0.3 percent of all 18- to 49-year-olds watching television at the time of the episode's airing. The episode first saw physical release as part of the 2016 compilation DVD, Card Wars.

Oliver Sava of The A.V. Club awarded the episode a "B−", calling it "disappointing" and "disjointed". He felt that the episode was "the weakest installment" of the week long Adventure Time marathon, because it was "a conceptually flimsy episode that goes off on strange tangents that never quite cohere into a substantial narrative." Despite this, he felt that the episode was still entertaining, and he praised the voice work of both Lawless and Dean. He also applauded the fight scene between Finn, Tiffany, and the worms, calling it "thrillingly choreographed". In the end, however, he noted: "In the grand scheme of season 6, 'Dentist' doesn't make much of an impression."

The episode caused a minor controversy on the Internet due to the naming of Andy Daly's character "Lt. Gamergate". Some fans interpreted this name to be a reference to the 2014 Gamergate controversy. However, Wolfhard later noted on Twitter that the name was actually a reference to a type of ant. Co-executive producer Adam Muto later reiterated this claim, noting that the episode was written six months prior to its airing, thus predating the Gamergate controversy. Carolyn Cox of The Mary Sue later commented on the issue, noting: "Considering how far in advance of their air date Adventure Time episodes are written, it's an indication of both the Internet's weariness with the movement and Gamergaters' disproportionate obsession with the cause that fans immediately assumed the episode was referencing the current climate in gaming culture."
