= Furniture & Meat =

- Adventure Time episode
- Episode no.: Season 6 Episode 8
- Directed by: Elizabeth Ito (Note: Supervising director); Nick Jennings (Note: Art director)
- Written by: Cole Sanchez; Andy Ristaino
- Story by: Kent Osborne; Pendleton Ward; Jack Pendarvis; Adam Muto
- Production code: 1025-171
- Original air date: June 19, 2014
- Running time: 11 minutes

Guest appearances
- Steve Agee as Ancient Psychic Tandem War Elephant; Andy Milonakis as Neptr, Wildberry Kid

Episode chronology
← Previous "Food Chain"	Next → "The Prince Who Wanted Everything"
- Adventure Time season 6

"Furniture & Meat" is the eighth episode of the sixth season of the American animated television series Adventure Time. The episode was written by Cole Sanchez and Andy Ristaino from a story by Kent Osborne, Pendleton Ward, Jack Pendarvis, and Adam Muto.

The series follows the adventures of Finn (voiced by Jeremy Shada), a human boy, and his best friend and adopted brother Jake (voiced by John DiMaggio), a dog with magical powers to change shape and grow and shrink at will. In this episode, BMO (voiced by Niki Yang)—concerned that Finn and Jake's hoard of gold is threatening the structural integrity of their treehouse—talks Finn into spending the money in Wildberry Kingdom.

The episode was viewed by 1.9 million viewers, and ranked as the 52nd most-watched cable show on the day of its airing. Many reviews complimented the humor and tone of the episode, and Jason Krell of io9 Animation appreciated the return of the Ancient Psychic Tandem War Elephant.

== Plot ==
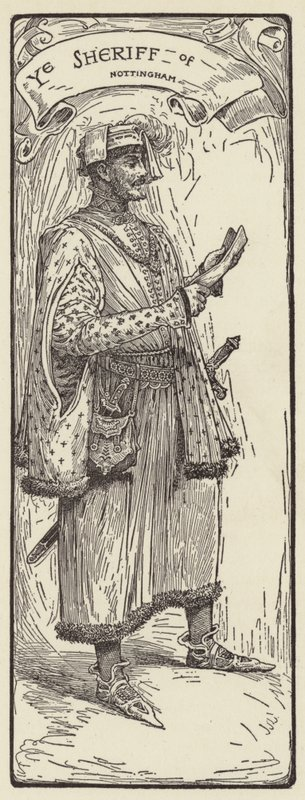
The Sheriff of Nottingham, a character from the legend of Robin Hood, is spoofed in the beginning of the episode.

Outside their tree house, Finn and Jake snooze, while BMO (Niki Yang) and N.E.P.T.R. (Andy Milonakis) play out a spoof of Robin Hood and the Sheriff of Nottingham. The two break open Finn and Jake's treasure room, pouring their massive stash of gold out into the yard, as well as the Ancient Psychic Tandem War Elephant (Steve Agee). BMO talks Finn into spending the money at an expensive resort at Wildberry Kingdom. When they arrive in the town square, Jake unloads their treasure into the city's fountain. A guard scolds them for this, but they bribe him with a few shillings and a crown, freeing them from the law. Chaos follows shortly after Jake uses wealth to control the residents. When they disrespect her authority, Wildberry Princess (Maria Bamford) orders Finn and Jake to be arrested and for their money to be seized and melted down. Her punishment is for them to be covered in the molten gold, but BMO and N.E.P.T.R. arrive just in time and save the two.

== Production ==
"Furniture & Meat" was written and storyboarded by Cole Sanchez and Andy Ristaino. It was adapted from a story by Kent Osborne, Jack Pendarvis, Adam Muto, and series creator Pendleton Ward. Like most episodes of the season, the episode was produced in approximately nine months. Muto, Osborne and Pendarvis crafted a two-page outline, which was then sent to Sanchez and Ristaino for storyboarding in the course of two weeks (Sanchez and Ristaino are one out of four main storyboarding teams for the series). The final storyboard was drafted on December 17, 2013. Stamped with the production code "1025-171", the storyboard was then sent back to Osborne, for any final feedback, and to the network, for any final notes. The network approved it three weeks later.

== Broadcast and reception ==
"Furniture & Meat" first aired in the United States on June 19, 2014, on Cartoon Network. The episode was watched by 1.9 million viewers, receiving a Nielsen rating of 0.4 for adults in the 18- to 49-year-old demographic. It was 52nd most-watched television episode on the date of its airing, according to TV by the Numbers.

For io9 Animation, Jason Krell called it "pretty solid", albeit lacking in relation to the season's story arc. In his "additional musings" section, he hoped that the war elephant will make a "more meaningful" return, while questioning why nobody in the episode commented on the return of Finn's arm from "Breezy". Oliver Sava of The A.V. Club gave it a B+, referring it as a throwback to early episodes of the show where specific lessons were taught without dealing with the serial elements of surrounding episodes. He wrote that, while "not quite as substantial as recent installments, it's still very entertaining". Ryley Trahan of the online Entertainment Weekly praised the use of Ward's "best, most subversive humor", calling it a "great one-shot look" into the main duo's mischief; in the print publication, Ray Rahman summarized, "it's never too early to start saving, kids".

=== Home video ===
The episode first saw physical release on the Finn the Human DVD set on November 25, 2014, containing 16 episodes from assorted seasons. In Geek Smash, Colin O'Boyle considered it one of many "great" episodes included in the release.

== See also ==
- "The Limit", an episode of the second season of Adventure Time that introduced the Ancient Psychic Tandem War Elephant
- "Something Big" (Adventure Time), his latest appearance this season
