= Adventure Time season 6 =

Adventure Time
- Season 6
- DVD cover
- Showrunner: Adam Muto
- Starring: Jeremy Shada; John DiMaggio
- No. of episodes: 43

Release
- Original network: Cartoon Network
- Original release: April 21, 2014 – June 5, 2015

Season chronology
- ← Previous; Season 5 Next → Season 7

The sixth season of Adventure Time, an American animated television series created by Pendleton Ward, premiered on Cartoon Network on April 21, 2014 and concluded on June 5, 2015. The season follows the adventures of Finn, a human boy, and his best friend and adoptive brother Jake, a dog with magical powers to change shape and size at will. Finn and Jake live in the post-apocalyptic Land of Ooo, where they interact with the other main characters of the show: Princess Bubblegum, The Ice King, Marceline the Vampire Queen, Lumpy Space Princess, BMO, and Flame Princess.

The season also featured Masaaki Yuasa and David Ferguson as guest animators for the episodes "Food Chain" and "Water Park Prank", respectively. This season was the last to feature Sanchez and Ristaino as storyboard artists; the former took a directing job on the mini-series Long Live the Royals (although he eventually returned to the series as a supervising director for its eighth season), and the latter became an Adventure Time background designer.

The season premiered with two episodes, "Wake Up" and "Escape from the Citadel", which together were viewed by 3.32 million viewers. This marked a significant increase in ratings from the previous season finale. The season concluded with the two-part finale "Hot Diggity Doom" and "The Comet", which was viewed by 1.55 million viewers. Beginning with this season, Adventure Time moved from its long-held Monday timeslot, with many episodes instead airing on Thursdays. A number of sixth-season episodes also aired internationally before they were broadcast domestically. The season was met with largely positive critical reception. The episode "Food Chain" was nominated for several Annie Awards, as well as an Annecy International Animated Film Festival Award. The episode "Jake the Brick" won a Primetime Emmy Award for Short-format Animation at the 67th Primetime Emmy Awards, and Tom Herpich won an Emmy for his work on "Walnuts & Rain". Furthermore, "The Diary" and "Walnuts and Rain" were nominated for Annie Awards, and the show itself won a Peabody Award. In addition, several compilation DVDs that contain episodes from the season have been released. The full season was released on DVD and Blu-ray on October 11, 2016.

== Development ==
=== Concept ===
The season follows the adventures of Finn the Human, a human boy, and his best friend Jake, a dog with magical powers to change shape, grow, and shrink at will. Finn and Jake live in the post-apocalyptic Land of Ooo, wherein they interact with the other major characters, including: Princess Bubblegum, The Ice King, Marceline the Vampire Queen, Lumpy Space Princess, BMO, and Flame Princess. Common storylines revolve around Finn and Jake discovering strange creatures, dealing with the antagonistic but misunderstood Ice King, and battling monsters in order to help others. This season's main story arc, however, deals with Finn discovering the true identity of his human father, and his subsequent attempts to reconnect with him. The season ends with Princess Bubblegum being deposed by the King of Ooo (voiced by Andy Daly), and Finn fighting the primordial cosmic space demon Orgalorg (the actual identity of Gunter the penguin).

=== Production ===
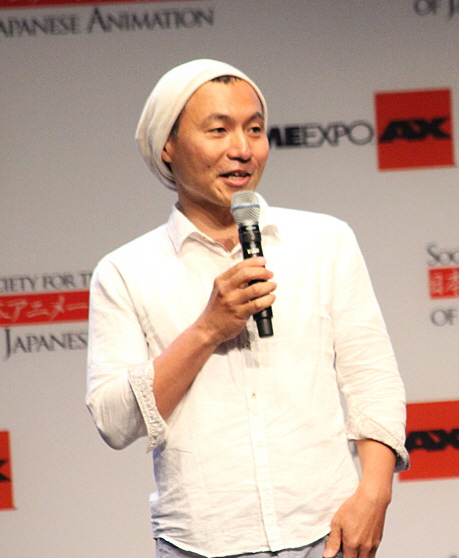
Japanese guest animator Masaaki Yuasa directed the episode "Food Chain". The episode was a critical success.

On January 28, 2013, during the middle of the show's fifth season, Cartoon Network officially announced that the show had been renewed for a sixth season. In July 2013, storyboard artist Jesse Moynihan revealed that production for the sixth season had begun. This season's episodes were produced in a process similar to those of the previous seasons' episodes. Each episode was outlined in two-to-three pages that contained the necessary plot information. These outlines were then handed to storyboard artists, who created full storyboards. (Note: Information regarding story development and storyboard artists is taken from the opening credits of the season's forty-three episodes.) Design and coloring were done at Cartoon Network Studios in Burbank, California, and animation was handled overseas in South Korea by Rough Draft Korea and Saerom Animation. While almost all of the animation for the show is done through these studios, two episodes were written and animated entirely by guest animators. The first, "Food Chain", was helmed by noted Japanese animator Masaaki Yuasa, and was entirely animated by Yuasa's own studio. The second, "Water Park Prank", was directed by David Ferguson.

"The Prince Who Wanted Everything" marked the return of Youn—a storyboarder during the show's first, third, and fourth seasons—to the series. He had left after the first season for mandatory military service in his native South Korea, and returned during the third season. He once again left the series after the conclusion of its fourth season to focus his attention on Studio Spiyo in Seoul, South Korea. However, Youn returned to work on "The Prince Who Wanted Everything", although it was a "one-off gig", and he subsequently took a job working on Over the Garden Wall. The sixth season of Adventure Time also marked the final season that both Andy Ristaino and Cole Sanchez worked as storyboard artists. Ristaino revealed in a podcast that, once the season was finished, he was "burnt out". He did, however, return as a background designer for the seventh season. Sanchez, on the other hand, left the series to become a supervising director on Long Live the Royals. He eventually returned to the series as a supervising director for its eighth season.

This was the last season of Adventure Time to feature Nick Jennings as the series' art director; he had originally been brought on at the start of the first season at the behest of Cartoon Network, and had served as the sole art director for five and a half seasons. Following the show's sixth season, he left to work on the 2016 reboot of the Powerpuff Girls. He was replaced by Sandra Lee—also known as Sandra Calleros—who had previously been the series' background paint supervisor. Both Jennings and Lee were credited as art co-directors starting with the thirty-third episode, "Jermaine".

== Cast ==
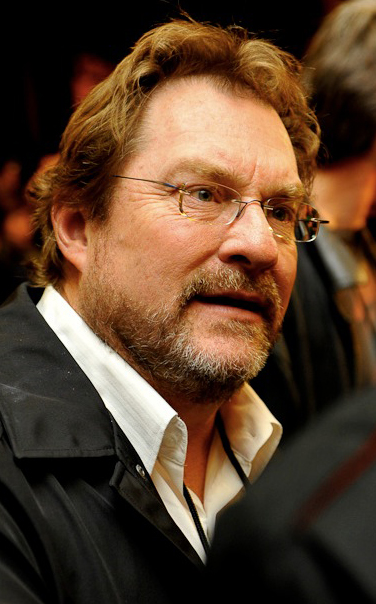
This season introduces the character Martin, Finn's father, voiced by Stephen Root.

The voice actors for the season include: Jeremy Shada (Finn the Human), John DiMaggio (Jake the Dog), Tom Kenny (The Ice King), Hynden Walch (Princess Bubblegum), and Olivia Olson (Marceline the Vampire Queen). Ward himself provides the voice for several minor characters, including Lumpy Space Princess. Former storyboard artist Niki Yang voices the sentient video game console BMO in English, as well as Jake's girlfriend Lady Rainicorn in Korean. Polly Lou Livingston, a friend of Pendleton Ward's mother, Bettie Ward, plays the voice of the small elephant Tree Trunks. Justin Roiland provides the voice of the Earl of Lemongrab. Jessica DiCicco voices Flame Princess, Finn's former romantic interest. Several episodes also feature The Lich, the series' principal antagonist. The Lich is portrayed by Ron Perlman in his demonic form, and by Ethan Maher as a large baby after the events of the season premiere. Finn's father, Martin, first introduced in "Escape from the Citadel", is voiced by Stephen Root. The Adventure Time cast records their lines together as opposed to doing it individually. This is to capture more natural sounding dialogue among the characters. Hynden Walch has described these group session as akin to "doing a play reading—a really, really out there play."

In addition to the regular cast members, episodes feature guest voices from many ranges of professions, including actors, musicians, and artists. The season openers, "Wake Up" and "Escape from the Citadel", feature the return of Kumail Nanjiani as Prismo, M. Emmet Walsh as the Cosmic Owl, and Miguel Ferrer as Death and one of the heads of Grob Gob Glob Grod. Nanjiani would return again in the episodes "Is That You?" and "Hoots"; Walsh would reappear in "Hoots". "James II" features Andy Merrill reprising his role as James. The A.V. Club columnist Cameron Esposito lends her voice to Carroll the cloud woman. "Sad Face" features both Andy Milonakis reprising his role as the Never-Ending Pie Throwing Robot (N.E.P.T.R.)., and Brett Gelman as the bug ringleader. Milonakis would also return in "Furniture & Meat". Comedian Melinda Hill reprises her role as Doctor Princess in the episode "Breezy", which also features the vocal talents of Ashly Burch as the titular character. Burch would also voice a blacksmith in "Little Brother", and the Super Porp spokesperson Cheryl in "Dark Purple". Regular Show writer and voice actor Minty Lewis voices Erin the caterpillar in "Food Chain". "The Prince Who Wanted Everything" features both Madeleine Martin as Fionna and Roz Ryan as Cake, as well as Peter Serafinowicz, who voices Lumpy Space Prince, the gender-switched version of Lumpy Space Princess. Prolific voice actor Alan Oppenheimer also voices Darren and the Sun in "Something Big", and actress Jill Talley also reprises her role as Maja. "Something Big" also sees the return of Keith Ferguson as Colonel Candy Corn; he would also reprise this role in several other season six episodes. James Urbaniak plays both Leafbeard and the Rat King in "Little Brother", and Thurop Van Orman, a former supervising producer and writer for the series during its second season, also appears in the aforementioned episode, playing the part of Kent. Kristen Schaal and Dan Mintz reprise their roles as Jake Jr. and T.V., respectively, in "Ocarina", and the episode also sees the introduction of Marc Evan Jackson and Paget Brewster as Kim Kil Whan and Viola, respectively. Duncan Trussell, Steve Little, Dana Snyder, and series storyboard artist Cole Sanchez, return in "Thanks for the Crabapples, Giuseppe!", playing the roles of Ron James, Abracadaniel, the Ancient Sleeping Magi of Life Giving, and Little Dude, respectively.

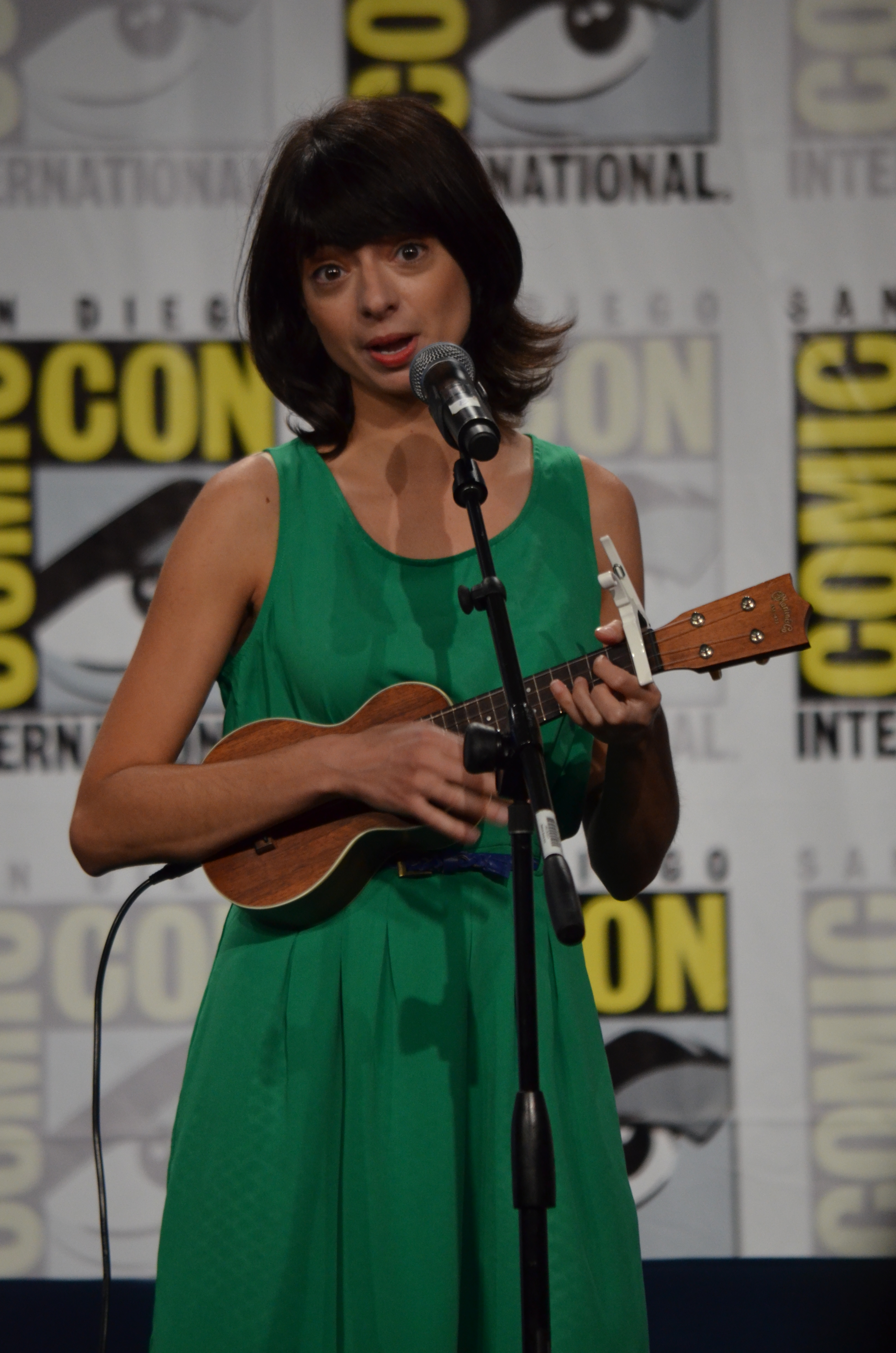
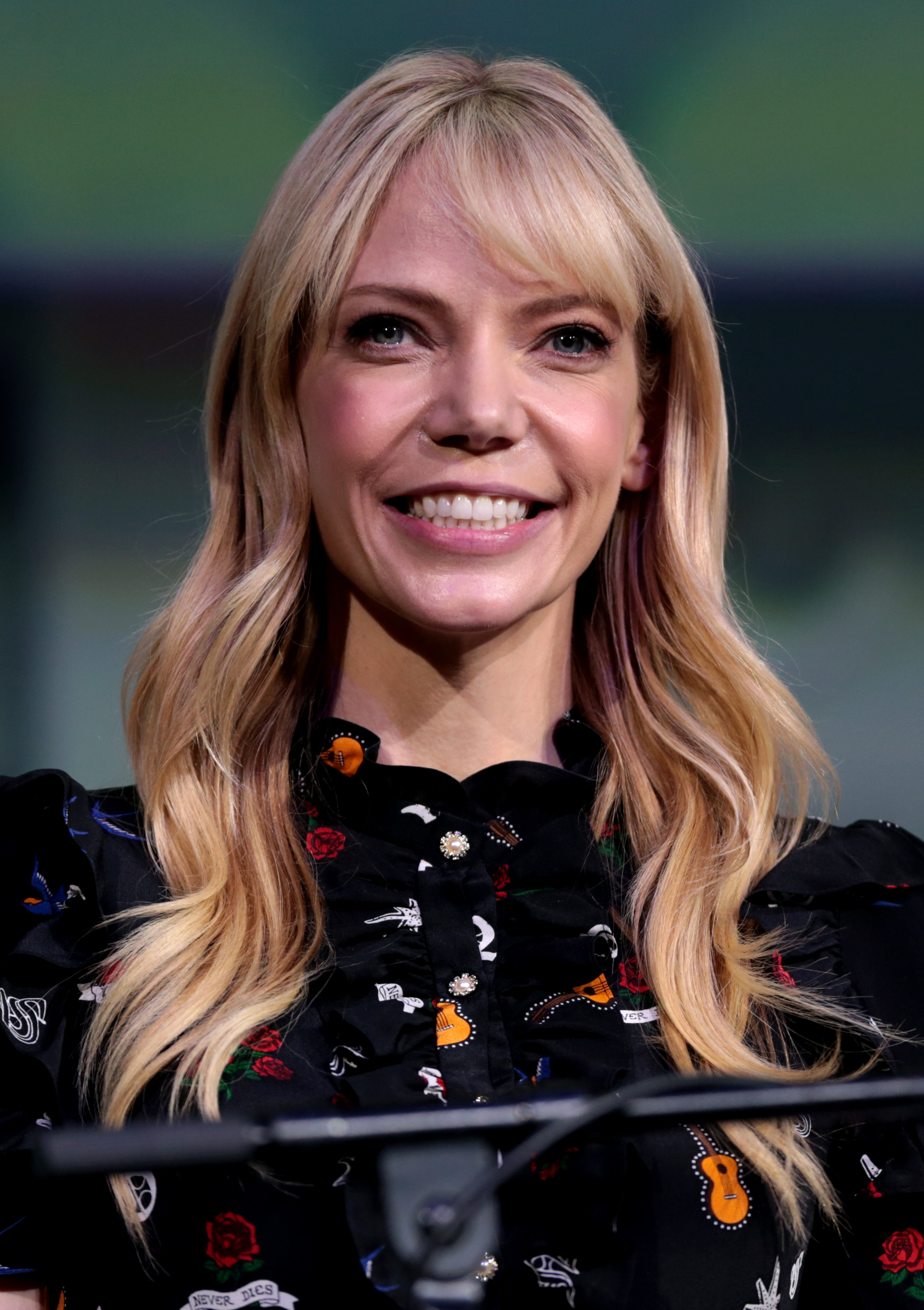
Kate Micucci (left) and Riki Lindhome (right), the two members of the comedy band Garfunkel and Oates, appear in the episode "Chips & Ice Cream".

Grey DeLisle returns to voice Breakfast Princess in "Princess Day". Rainn Wilson reprises his role as Rattleballs in "Nemesis", and also voices the new character Peace Master. Billy West voices Goose, Dr. Erik Adamkinson, and the Mayor in "Everything's Jake", and Tress MacNeille appears in the same episode, playing the part of Dr. Erik Adamkinson's father. In "Dentist", Collin Dean reprises his role as Tiffany, Lucy Lawless guest stars as the Queen of the Ants, and Andy Daly plays Lieutenant Gamergate. Daly also reprises his role as the King of Ooo in "Gold Stars" and the first part of the season finale, "Hot Diggity Doom". Brody Stevens voices a character in "The Cooler". "Evergreen" guest stars Pamela Adlon, Alan Tudyk, and Keith David as Gunter, Chatsberry, and Balthus, respectively. "Gold Stars" sees the introduction of Paul Scheer as Toronto, a character who would also appear in "Hot Diggity Doom". "The Mountain" features prolific voice actor Jim Cummings as Matthew. Jackie Buscarino returns as Susan Strong in "Dark Purple". In "The Diary", Dan Mintz voices T.V., Alia Shawkat voices the younger version of Nurse Poundcake, and Clark Duke plays both Justin Rockcandy and Jawbreaker guy. "Walnuts & Rain" sees the introduction of the bear Seven, voiced by Chris Isaak. The episode also features Matt L. Jones, an actor who first appeared in the first season episode "Memories of Boom Boom Mountain" voicing the crying Mountain, lending his voice to King Huge. "Friends Forever" guest stars Tipper Newton as Lamp and Brent Weinbach as Bass Drum. Newton would later reappear in "On the Lam", voicing the alien emperor. Jon Wurster voices the demon Bryce, and Tom Scharpling voices Jermaine in the episode of the same name. "Chips & Ice Cream" guest stars Ron Livingston, Riki Lindhome, and Kate Micucci; the latter two comprise the comedy band Garfunkel and Oates. Lindhome had previously appeared in the season five episode "The Party's Over, Isla de Señorita", playing the Island Lady, and Micucci had previously appeared in the season two episode "Heat Signature", playing Wendy, one of Marceline's ghost friends. Emo Philips reprises his role as Cuber in the episode "Graybles 1000+", and the episode also features musician Janet Klein as Tuber, the sister of Cuber. Kay Lenz voices Gunter's dream manifestation in "Hoots". Lena Dunham returns in "You Forgot Your Floaties", reprising her role as Betty, and Gillian Jacobs appears, voicing the role of M.A.R.G.L.E.S. Matt Gourley and Melissa Villaseñor guest star in "Orgalorg" as alien elders. The catalyst comet in "The Comet" was voiced by Tig Notaro.

Various minor and background characters are voiced by Tom Kenny, Dee Bradley Baker, Maria Bamford, Steve Little, and Kent Osborne.

== Broadcast and reception ==
=== Broadcast ===
For the first five and a half seasons, the show aired on Monday nights. However starting with "Breezy", the show began to air on different days; following "Breezy", many episodes aired on Thursdays, although the season's seventeenth episode, "Ghost Fly", aired on a Tuesday night as a Halloween special. Following several months without new episodes, four installments—"Everything's Jake", "Is That You", "Jake the Brick", and "Dentist"—aired back-to-back on November 24, 25, 26, and 28, respectively. Likewise, the final six episodes of the season aired during the week of June 1, with the two-part season finale airing on June 5.

In addition, several episodes aired internationally prior to their domestic debut: "Evergreen" was broadcast on November 10 by Cartoon Network in Brazil, "Astral Plane" was uploaded onto Cartoon Network's Brazilian website on December 24, 2014, "The Visitor" first aired on February 3, 2015 on Cartoon Network in South Korea, and both "Friends Forever" and "Jermaine" aired on Cartoon Network in Latin America on April 6, 2015 and April 13, 2015 respectively.

=== Ratings ===
The season debuted on April 21, 2014, with the two-part episode "Wake Up"/"Escape from the Citadel". Together, both episodes were viewed by 3.321 million viewers and scored a 0.7 Nielsen rating in the 18- to 49-year-old demographic. Nielsen ratings are audience measurement systems that determine the audience size and composition of television programming in the United States, which means that the episodes were seen by 0.7 percent of all households aged 18 to 49 years old were watching television at the time of the episode's airing. This marked a slight decrease in viewers when compared to the previous season premiere "Finn the Human"/"Jake the Dog", which was seen by 3.44 million viewers, but it marked a massive increase of almost one million viewers when compared with the previous season finale, "Billy's Bucket List". The premiere was also the most-watched Cartoon Network telecast at the time of its airing among children aged 2–11 and 9–14, as well as with boys 2–11 and 9–14. It also marked a 153 percent increase in overall demographic ratings when compared to the same time the previous year. The season hit its nadir with the seventeenth episode, "Ghost Fly", which was seen by only 1.3 million viewers and scored a 0.2 percent adult 18–49 Nielsen rating, meaning that it was seen by only 0.2 percent of all 18- to 49-year-olds watching television at the time of the episode's airing. The season concluded with the two-part episode "Hot Diggity Doom"/"The Comet", which, together, were seen by 1.55 million viewers. The episodes scored 0.4 percent adult 18–49 Nielsen rating.

=== Reviews and accolades ===
The season received largely positive critical reviews. Eric Kohn of IndieWire applauded the two-part season opener, "Wake Up" and "Escape from the Citadel", for taking a darker turn in regards to the series' storytelling. Furthermore, he noted that the storyline concerning "Finn's cursed sword arm—an ingredient that has festered in the sidelines for weeks—reaches a beguiling new state." Likewise, Oliver Sava of The A.V. Club complimented the episodes for being full of harsh realizations concerning Finn's father and the vulnerability of his body; he ultimately concluded that "the developments of these two episodes dramatically alter the series' status quo to give this season an added boost of momentum from the very beginning." Each episode was also graded by The A.V. Club with a different letter grade; the season received two C's, twenty-two B's, and seventeen A's.

The A.V. Club named the series the 27th best television series of 2014, noting that, "The ongoing sixth season has ventured into even more dangerous emotional territory: parenthood. Coupled with deep dives into the history of Ooo and the increasing visual confidence of episodes like the surreal, breathtaking 'Food Chain,' Adventure Time appears ready to use its considerable heft and years of laying narrative foundations to do some of TV's finest storytelling about grappling with the past and accepting the responsibilities of adulthood." The site selected "Food Chain" and "Breezy" as stand-out episodes from 2014, and it later named the season finale "The Comet" one of the best TV episodes of 2015.

Masaaki Yuasa and Eunyoung Choi were both nominated for an "Outstanding Achievement, Directing in an Animated TV/Broadcast Production" Annie Award for their work on "Food Chain". "Food Chain" was later selected for competition at the 2015 Annecy International Animated Film Festival, On April 23, 2015, it was announced that the series had won a Peabody Award for Best Children's Programming. At the 67th Primetime Emmy Awards in 2015, the episode "Jake the Brick" won a Primetime Emmy Award for Short-format Animation, and Tom Herpich won an Outstanding Individual Achievement in Animation Emmy for his work on "Walnuts & Rain". At the 2016 Annie Awards, the writing staff for "The Diary" was nominated for an Outstanding Achievement, Writing in an Animated TV/Broadcast Production award, and Herpich was nominated for an Outstanding Achievement, Storyboarding in an Animated TV/Broadcast Production award.

== Episodes ==
No. overall	No. in season	Title	Supervising direction by	Written and storyboarded by	Original release date (Note: "Evergreen" first aired on November 10, 2014 on Cartoon Network in Latin America. "Astral Plane" was first uploaded on December 24, 2014 onto Cartoon Network's official Brazilian website. "The Visitor" first aired on February 3, 2015 on Cartoon Network in South Korea. "Friends Forever" and "Jermaine" aired on Cartoon Network in Latin America on April 6, 2015 and April 13, 2015 respectively. However, because this field specifically refers to domestic airdates, the information here will denote when these episodes first aired in the United States.)	Prod. code	US viewers (millions)
157	1	"Wake Up" (Part 1)	Elizabeth Ito	Cole Sanchez & Andy Ristaino	April 21, 2014	1025-166	3.32
Finn and Jake try to commit a cosmic crime to get into a multiverse prison called the Citadel, in which Finn's father is trapped. Revealing himself as a dream-based manifestation, Prismo (voiced by Kumail Nanjiani) offers to help them by instructing them to bring him the old man who dreamt him up so they can wake him up. However, having been in a comatose state since his previous plan was ruined, the Lich (voiced by Ron Perlman) beats the duo to the punch by waking up the old man and then killing him; the Citadel's guardian subsequently captures him.
158	2	"Escape from the Citadel" (Part 2)	Adam Muto	Tom Herpich & Steve Wolfhard	April 21, 2014	1025-163	3.32
Hitching a ride on the Lich's crystalized prison, Jake and Finn find the latter's father Martin (voiced by Stephen Root), who is not what Finn expected, as they are forced to flee when the Lich destroys the Citadel while putting the prisoners under his control to begin his plan of destruction. While Finn and Jake are distracted with the Lich, Martin flees with Finn giving chase. In the ensuing chase, Finn's grass sword takes over his entire arm, causing Finn to lose it as Martin escapes. Despite this setback, the Lich is turned into a giant baby, who they leave with Tree Trunks and Mr. Pig.
159	3	"James II"	Elizabeth Ito	Somvilay Xayaphone & Seo Kim	April 28, 2014	1025-164	2.03
Finn and Jake learn that Clone James (voiced by Andy Merrill) has been faking his death in order to collect medals. After discovering that there are, in fact, 25 Jameses on the loose, Princess Bubblegum orders them to be arrested. However, before they can be apprehended, the goo monsters from the previous season episode "James" attack. The clones of James redeem themselves, however, by sacrificing themselves to save Princess Bubblegum, who in turn banishes the Jameses to the wasteland in return for new medals every day.
160	4	"The Tower"	Andres Salaff	Tom Herpich & Steve Wolfhard	May 5, 2014	1025-168	2.10
Finn is not happy with his replacement arms made by the princesses, and his emotional anguish manifests itself in the form of a telekinetic arm. With his psychic prosthesis, he decides to build a tower into space in order to find his father, and exact revenge by ripping off his arm. Finn becomes obsessed with building this tower, alarming Princess Bubblegum. After Finn breaches the atmosphere of Earth, he begins to hallucinate, but is rescued at the last minute by a spaceship. On board the spaceship, Finn thinks he see his father and attempts to exact his revenge, only to find himself unable to follow through. Once Finn gives up, Princess Bubblegum reveals that she set up the simulation after rescuing Finn, and that he is not actually on board his father's spacecraft.
161	5	"Sad Face"	Adam Muto	Graham Falk	May 12, 2014	1025-162	1.77
With N.E.P.T.R. (voiced by Andy Milonakis) and BMO watching, Jake's tail goes to work at a traveling bug circus once every month when Jake is asleep. The tail works as a clown with the stage name Blue Nose; he is berated by the circus's ring leader (voiced by Brett Gelman) and asked to make his performances "less artsy and more fartsy". Blue Nose is displeased with the manner the ring leader treats a captured chipmunk, who is paraded around like a wild beast. Blue Nose makes a deal with the ring leader that stipulates that if he can pull in more money than the chipmunk, it will be set free. Blue Nose then performs a hilarious routine that brings in money, but the ringer leader tries to not honor his agreement; Blue Nose and the chipmunk subsequently escape, and Blue Nose returns to Jake, just as the latter wakes up.
162	6	"Breezy"	Andres Salaff	Jesse Moynihan & Derek Ballard	June 5, 2014	1025-165	2.27
Warned by Doctor Princess that his flower-arm will die if he does not begin to feel again, Finn decides to try and kiss as many Princesses in order to regain his sense of emotion and excitement. Finn soon meets a bee named Breezy (voiced by Ashly Burch), who acts as his wingman; however, Breezy has ulterior motives, desiring Finn's flower, which leads to Breezy developing feelings for Finn. Eventually, his flower changes into a tree that explodes, revealing that his arm has regrown inside.
163	7	"Food Chain"	Masaaki Yuasa^{g} Eunyoung Choi^{c}	Masaaki Yuasa	June 12, 2014	1025-161	1.97
Finn and Jake visit the Candy Kingdom's Museum of Natural History and learn about the food chain after being turned into its different parts—small birds, big birds, bacteria, plants, and finally caterpillars—by Magic Man (voiced by Kenny). As Finn and Jake journey along the food chain, they meet another character named Erin (voiced by Minty Lewis), whom Finn falls in love with and attempts to marry. The episode concludes with all the main characters singing a song about how the food chain works.
164	8	"Furniture & Meat"	Elizabeth Ito	Cole Sanchez & Andy Ristaino	June 19, 2014	1025-171	1.86
BMO, concerned that Finn and Jake's massive hoard of gold is threatening the structural integrity of their treehouse, talks Finn into spending the money at an expensive resort at Wildberry Kingdom. Chaos ensues when Jake begins wildly spending money and bribing local officials. After disrespecting her authority, Wildberry Princess orders Finn and Jake to be arrested and for their money to be seized and melted down; she punishes them to be covered in molten gold, but BMO and N.E.P.T.R. arrive just in time and save the two.
165	9	"The Prince Who Wanted Everything"	Adam Muto	Bert Youn, Kent Osborne, Adam Muto, & Lyle Partridge	June 26, 2014	1025-167	2.48
Lumpy Space Princess kidnaps and ties up Ice King, forcing him to read her own fan-fiction of Fionna and Cake about "the beautiful and sensitive" Lumpy Space Prince (voiced by Peter Serafinowicz), who leaves Lumpy Space and seeks refuge in the Land of Ooo. Lumpy Space Prince eventually meets Fionna (voiced by Madeleine Martin) and Cake (voiced by Roz Ryan) and tries to learn their simpler ways of life. Eventually, he is able to overcome the power of his parents by "not caring", saving the day and winning the hearts of both Fionna and Cake.
166	10	"Something Big"	Andres Salaff	Jesse Moynihan	July 3, 2014	1025-170	1.95
Maja the Sky Witch summons Daren, The Ancient Sleeper (voiced by Alan Oppenheimer) and orders him to attack the Candy Kingdom so that she may use the sentimental affection and caring of its citizens as fuel for her powers. Root Beer Guy sacrifices himself to stall Daren and Maja while Finn brings in his Ancient Psychic Tandem War Elephant to fight back. After defeating Maja and Daren, Finn decides that he cannot give orders to the Elephant anymore and decides to let him roam freely. The elephant eventually decides to help Maja recover from the coma he put her in.
167	11	"Little Brother"	Elizabeth Ito	Madéleine Flores & Adam Muto	July 10, 2014	1025-172	2.10
While throwing a party in Jake's viola, Shelby (voiced by Ward) accidentally cuts his lower half off, which becomes sentient. Shelby names his new brother Kent (voiced by Thurop Van Orman), and seeks Jake's help in order to be a good sibling. Jake tells Shelby to give Kent a sword and have him fight bad guys, which Shelby does. Kent journeys into the roots of the treehouse and encounters the Rat King (voiced by James Urbaniak), whom he eagerly challenges. Kent is knocked out and his sword is destroyed, but he is found by an inhabitant of the roots named Leaf-Beard (voiced by Urbaniak) who explains that his village has been tormented by the Rat King for some time. Kent acquires three materials, gets a new sword forged by a local blacksmith (voiced by Burch), and squares off against the Rat King, defeating him.
168	12	"Ocarina"	Andres Salaff	Tom Herpich & Steve Wolfhard	July 17, 2014	1025-173	1.86
After Finn and Jake arrive to the birthday party of Jake's children 3 hours late, Jake begins to irritate his business-savvy son Kim Kil Whan (voiced by Marc Evan Jackson) with his childish antics. Fed up, Whan purchases the deed to Finn and Jake's treehouse from Marceline and promptly rents out the treehouse to multiple tenants. After several days of dealing with Whan as the landlord, Jake becomes convinced that Whan simply wants to be noticed by his father. As result, Jake hand-crafts an ocarina for Whan, using it as collateral for the deed to the treehouse. Whan later meets with his wife and reveals that the real reason he bought the treehouse was to try and force Jake to become a productive and responsible person. Although his plan failed, Whan finally realizes the true nature of his father.
169	13	"Thanks for the Crabapples, Giuseppe!"	Elizabeth Ito	Somvilay Xayaphone & Seo Kim	July 24, 2014	1025-174	2.18
Ice King, Abracadaniel (voiced by Steve Little), Little Dude (voiced by Sanchez), the Life-Giving Magus (voiced by Dana Snyder), Ron James (voiced by Duncan Trussell), female water sprites (voiced by Walch and Grey DeLisle), and several other wizards go on a road trip in a bus to forge their own school of magic. However, their bus runs out of gas and loses its tires, forcing Ice King to freeze a road that the bus can slide on. After encountering a crabapple tree, an elderly wizard named Giuseppe is left behind by Ice King after he attempts to gather apples for the bus patrons. The bus eventually crashes into a swamp. In the nick of time Giuseppe soon arrives and uses psychokinetic magic to lift the bus out of the swamp, before disappearing in a sparkling fog. After this ordeal, the group feels as though they now have a secret to be proud of.
170	14	"Princess Day"	Elizabeth Ito	Somvilay Xayaphone & Seo Kim	July 31, 2014	1025-169	1.91
During the annual Princess Day meeting held in Breakfast Kingdom, Lumpy Space Princess clashes with Breakfast Princess over the year's events. After Breakfast Princess mocks Lumpy Space Princess's status in front of everyone, the latter leaves angrily. Meanwhile, Marceline gets bored during the meeting and follows Lumpy Space Princess outside and suggests that the two engage in pranks. The duo begin ransacking Breakfast Princess's room until they get chased out by guards. The two then steal Breakfast Princess's car, only to accidentally run over Breakfast Princess, who was attempting to stop them from leaving. Knocked out, Breakfast Princess is dragged into the trunk and then dumped off in the middle of the desert. Lumpy Space Princess and Marceline then take Breakfast Princess's car and accidentally drive it off a cliff.
171	15	"Nemesis"	Andres Salaff	Jesse Moynihan & Derek Ballard	August 7, 2014	1025-175	1.90
During the meeting of Starchy's Veritas Brigade, a man calling himself Peace Master (voiced by Rainn Wilson) appears and claims that there is a terrible evil trying to consume the Candy Kingdom. Princess Bubblegum, who is spying on the meeting, thinks Peace Master is talking about her. Meanwhile, Peppermint Butler (voiced by Steve Little), fearing that he has been found out by Peace Master, takes to his room and uses a ritual to track down Peace Master and confront him to a battle. Peace Master overpowers him, forcing Peppermint Butler to retreat. Peace Master then challenges Peppermint Butler to a final duel, during which the former loses. By order of Peppermint Butler as the victor, Peace Master leaves Candy Kingdom with Princess Bubblegum being completely unaware of Peppermint Butler's ways.
172	16	"Joshua & Margaret Investigations"	Elizabeth Ito	Cole Sanchez & Andy Ristaino	August 14, 2014	1025-176	2.05
During Jake's birthday party, Jake tells Finn and BMO a story about how his parents Joshua (voiced by Kent Osborne) and Margaret (voiced by Maria Bamford) hunted down a dangerous menace in the woods of Ooo before Jake was born. It is revealed that while hunting some sort of monster, Joshua was bitten by an otherworldly shape-shifter. Eventually, the wound started to grow, resulting in Jake being born from his father's head.
173	17	"Ghost Fly"	Cole Sanchez	Cole Sanchez & Graham Falk	October 28, 2014	1025-181	1.30
During a dark and stormy night, Jake kills a fly that eats some of his soup. In retaliation, the vengeful soul of the fly haunts the tree house. Finn and Jake attempt to get Peppermint Butler to exorcise the fly's spirit, but he leaves out of fear. After failing to adhere to proper exorcist protocol, Finn is turned into a fly. Jake gets BMO to karate chop his heart, allowing him to fight the fly on its own plane of existence. After a struggle, Jake kills the fly's spirit and is brought back to life.
174	18	"Everything's Jake"	Cole Sanchez	Somvilay Xayaphone & Seo Kim	November 24, 2014	1025-184	1.59
After meddling courtesy of Magic Man, Jake finds himself transported inside of himself, wherein an entire civilization exists, made entirely out of Jake's flesh. Jake tries to leave to get something to eat, but the world's inhabitants—including Jake's supposed best friend Goose (voiced by Billy West)—will not let him because they may face extinction.
175	19	"Is That You?"	Andres Salaff	Jesse Moynihan	November 25, 2014	1025-182	1.76
Following a memorial service for Prismo, Jake begins acting strangely. Finn soon realizes that the real Jake has been transported into Prismo's alternate dimension. After recreating the elaborate ritual that triggered the events, Finn is also transported to the dimension, wherein he runs into a program of Prismo. This program explains an elaborate plan that will allow Prismo to be resurrected. Both Finn and Jake follow Prismo's instructions, and are successful in reviving their friend.
176	20	"Jake the Brick"	Kent Osborne	Kent Osborne	November 26, 2014	1025-177	2.00
Jake attempts to fulfill an aspiration of his: to be a brick inside a shack as it collapses. Finn, being supportive, leaves a walkie talkie with Jake, who absentmindedly begins to narrate the events around him. Finn and BMO are drawn into Jake's storytelling, and Finn uses Starchy's radio station to broadcast Jake's narration of the trials and tribulations of a rabbit. All of Ooo is soon engrossed in the radio broadcast, unbeknownst to Jake.
177	21	"Dentist"	Andres Salaff	Tom Herpich & Steve Wolfhard	November 28, 2014	1025-188	1.40
When Finn's toothache gets too much to take, he has no choice but to visit the ants, led by General Tarsal (voiced by Lucy Lawless), who provide dental care in exchange for a tour of duty. However, Finn soon finds himself partnered up with Tiffany (voiced by Collin Dean), who constantly tries to kill him so that he may become Jake's best friend. Finn and Tiffany attempt to defend an underground intersection from aggressive worms. Just when victory is assured, Tiffany tries to kill Finn, but accidentally falls into the maw of the Queen Worm, to his apparent demise. Following this ordeal, Finn's teeth are promptly fixed.
178	22	"The Cooler"	Cole Sanchez	Cole Sanchez & Andy Ristaino	December 4, 2014	1025-186	1.84
After a natural disaster hits the Fire Kingdom, Flame Princess (voiced by Jessica DiCicco) is forced to team up with Princess Bubblegum. Unbeknownst to Flame Princess, Bubblegum set up the cooling in order to infiltrate the Flame Kingdom and deactivate the kingdom's Sleeping Fire Giants, extremely powerful and ancient weapons of mass destruction. Once Bubblegum's betrayal is known, the two princesses fight, resulting in destruction of all but one of the Fire Gods. Flame Princess calls Bubblegum a bad person, to which she protests. Eventually, after intense discussion, Flame Princess reveals her actual name—Phoebe—to Princess Bubblegum as a sign of friendship. Princess Bubblegum, in turn, pulls the plug from her extensive surveillance program.
179	23	"The Pajama War"	Cole Sanchez	Somvilay Xayaphone & Seo Kim	January 8, 2015	1025-189	2.04
At a slumber party at the Candy Kingdom, Princess Bubblegum and Finn are forced into a closet to play a variation of seven minutes in heaven; the two leave the party to hang out and go on a walk. However, the candy citizens believe that Finn and Bubblegum have passed out due to lack of oxygen and attempt to open the door. Eventually, the citizens form a makeshift government that quickly devolves into a despotism headed first by Col. Candy Corn (voiced by Keith Ferguson), and then Crunchy. The panic is only ended once Finn and Bubblegum return; before intervening, however, Bubblegum and Finn discuss how much they have enjoyed just spending time together.
180	24	"Evergreen"	Andres Salaff	Tom Herpich & Steve Wolfhard	January 15, 2015	1025-178	1.75
Millions of years before the start of the series, a mutated dinosaur by the name of Gunter (voiced by Pamela Adlon) and the ice elemental Urgence Evergreen (voiced by Kenny) try to save the planet from a comet by constructing a magical crown that will grants its wearer their one true wish. Although the two are able to secure a power supply for the crown, Evergreen is incapacitated before he can use it, resulting in Gunter placing it on his head; however, Gunter accidentally wishes to be an ice wizard like Evergreen, marring the crown for all future wearers, including the Ice King.
181	25	"Astral Plane"	Andres Salaff	Jesse Moynihan & Jillian Tamaki	January 22, 2015	1025-180	1.86
While camping with Jake, Finn begins astral projecting, which takes him on a journey across Ooo. After viewing Mr. Fox (voiced by Herpich), Bounce House Princess, Ice King, and Marceline, Finn begins to ponder the nature of life. Catching a ride on a space lard, Finn is carried to Mars, where he witnesses Grob Gob Glob Grod sacrifice himself to save the citizens of Mars from an incoming comet, which is later revealed to be a spacecraft being piloted by Finn's father, Martin.
182	26	"Gold Stars"	Elizabeth Ito	Somvilay Xayaphone & Seo Kim	January 29, 2015	1025-179	1.85
Tree Trunks and Mr. Pig's child, Sweet P (voiced by Ethan Maher), is bullied at school. The King of Ooo (voiced by Andy Daly) and his lawyer dog Toronto (voiced by Paul Scheer) then trick him into dancing for the amusement of other people; the King of Ooo and Toronto use Sweet P as a distraction so that they can pickpocket people. The two criminals convince Sweet P to continue working with them by giving him gold stars, but eventually, Sweet P learns that he is being used to hurt others, and the suppressed manifestation of the Lich (voiced by Ron Perlman) terrifies King of Ooo and Toronto into leaving Sweet P alone.
183	27	"The Visitor"	Andres Salaff	Tom Herpich & Steve Wolfhard	February 5, 2015	1025-183	1.71
After sleepwalking, Finn is led to both a friendly civilization, and to the mysterious location of a downed spaceship. In the area, Finn stumbles upon his father, Martin, and attempts to bond with him. However, Finn soon realizes that Martin seems to care about no one but himself; Finn even tries to pry details of his birth from his father, but Martin provides only a few vague details. Finn, fed up with his father, closes him in the spaceship's escape pod and activates it, sending Martin into space. Finn then proceeds to save the members of the friendly civilization from the downed spaceship.
184	28	"The Mountain"	Andres Salaff	Jesse Moynihan & Sam Alden	February 12, 2015	1025-187	1.67
Lemongrab and Finn go on an expedition through the Mountain of Matthew to learn more about themselves. After being presented with three mirrors that show the viewer two false realities and one true reality, both Finn and Lemongrab both chose correctly and soon come into contact with the being Matthew (voiced by Jim Cummings), who meets his demise thanks to the antics of Lemongrab.
185	29	"Dark Purple"	Adam Muto	Adam Muto & Sloane Leong	February 19, 2015	1025-185	2.15
Susan Strong (voiced by Jackie Buscarino) and her Hyooman associates break into the pre-war Super Porp soda factory in order to save a baby that was kidnapped by one of its delivery drones. Susan Strong soon discovers a race of mutated beings, who slave all day to craft the delicious Super Porp. Susan and her associates eventually square off against Cheryl (voiced by Burch), the dying spokesperson for the company, who reveals that she needs the baby to keep brand awareness strong. Susan saves the child and has the plant dismantled, which results in terrible soda.
186	30	"The Diary"	Cole Sanchez	Jillian Tamaki	February 26, 2015	1025-190	1.91
Jake's son T.V. (voiced by Dan Mintz) finds an old diary, which revives a decades-old mystery surrounding the writer of the book. T.V. soon pours over the scrawling of the writer, whose initials are B.P. (voiced by Alia Shawkat). The more and more T.V. reads, however, the more obsessive he becomes, to the point where he soon begins to experience everything that the diary's author wrote about. Eventually, with the help of Jake, T.V. is able to discover that the diary belonged to Nurse Poundcake (voiced by Little) when she was younger.
187	31	"Walnuts & Rain"	Andres Salaff	Tom Herpich	March 5, 2015	1025-193	1.68
When Finn and Jake fall into two different pits, in which they meet two different fates: Finn becomes the guest of the unstable King Huge (voiced by Matt L. Jones), who insists that Finn remain with him and stare at his idiosyncratic cuckoo clock; whereas Jake meets Seven (voiced by Chris Isaak), a bear whose makeshift air raft has been falling down the hole for years. Eventually, it turns out that the hole Jake and Seven are falling through is the chimney to the kitchen where Finn is being held captive. As such, Jake is eventually able to save Finn.
188	32	"Friends Forever"	Cole Sanchez	Cole Sanchez & Andy Ristaino	April 16, 2015	1025-191	1.57
The Ice King invites over the Life-Giving Magus under the guise of spending time together, when in reality Ice King wants to use him to bring his appliances to life in the hopes that he can befriend them. All of the newly conscious objects are more conscious and intellectual than Ice King would have liked, and disapprove of his sense of humor, except for a very sympathetic lamp (voiced by Tipper Newton). After trying—and failing—to understand their ways, Ice King ends up destroying all of them in a rage after they criticize him and try to take away his crown.
189	33	"Jermaine"	Andres Salaff	Jesse Moynihan & Brandon Graham	April 23, 2015	1025-192	1.53
After a bizarre dream, Finn and Jake venture to the home of their brother, Jermaine (voiced by Tom Scharpling). The duo journey to their old familial house, which is still inhabited by Jermaine. The building is surrounded by demons, which Jermaine vigilantly fends off. Jermaine eventually gets into a fight with Jake, pointing out that he has had to take care of their father's affairs, whereas Jake has gotten to lead a life of adventure. Once the tensions cool—and the brothers' home burns to the ground—amends are finally made.
190	34	"Chips & Ice Cream"	Cole Sanchez	Somvilay Xayaphone & Seo Kim	April 30, 2015	1025-194	1.69
After a bizarre curse gets placed on Jake by a bear named Morty Rogers (voiced by Ron Livingston), Jake is forced to live with two creatures named Chips and Ice Cream (voiced by Riki Lindhome and Kate Micucci respectively) that talk in a nonsense language consisting only of their names. Jake initially tries to live his life with the two creatures, but their incessant chattering begins to drive Finn and Jake crazy. Eventually, BMO figures out how to free Chips and Ice Cream, and they ascend into the heavens.
191	35	"Graybles 1000+"	Andres Salaff	Steve Wolfhard	May 7, 2015	1025-195	1.58
Cuber (voiced by Emo Philips) uses his graybles to survive after crash landing in a futuristic and bleak version of Ooo. Each of the graybles—revolving around Finn, Jake, and BMO; Ice King and Gunter; Princess Bubblegum and Starchy; and Cuber himself—allow Cuber to survive and adapt in this alien world, and successfully evade a group of vengeful creatures, bent on destroying Cuber after he accidentally disturbed a wedding of theirs.
192	36	"Hoots"	Adam Muto	Kent Osborne & Andy Ristaino	May 14, 2015	1025-196	1.54
After the Cosmic Owl (voiced by M. Emmet Walsh) spies an attractive lady bird (voiced by Kay Lenz) in Finn's dream, he begins to shirk his duties. He proceeds to do everything in his power to talk to her and find out who she is. Eventually, the two meet up, and the Cosmic Owl unwittingly invites the lady bird into the dream of Princess Bubblegum. In this dream, the lady bird suddenly turns into a deadly demon, spelling doom for Princess Bubblegum and the Candy Kingdom—due to the prophetic nature of dreams featuring the Cosmic Owl, this may come to pass in the waking world. It is later revealed that the lady bird was the dream manifestation of Gunter.
193	37	"Water Park Prank"	David Ferguson^{g}	David Ferguson	May 21, 2015	1025-202	1.42
Finn and Jake take a break and go to a post-apocalyptic water park. While at the park, they run into the Ice King and decide to prank him by blocking up the water slide he is trying to go down.
194	38	"You Forgot Your Floaties"	Andres Salaff	Jesse Moynihan	June 1, 2015	1025-197	1.57
Finn and Jake try to rescue Magic Man's new apprentice, Betty (voiced by Lena Dunham), but Magic Man stops them. Betty and Magic Man then create a system that will make Magic Man the new "globhead", allowing him to assume the position once held by his brother, Grob Gob Glob Grod. The two have a vision about an artificial intelligence that Magic Man created, called M.A.R.G.L.E.S., named after his dead wife who was taken by the entity Golb. M.A.R.G.L.E.S. was designed to be used as a weapon to stop Golb. A mishap, however, caused M.A.R.G.L.E.S. to severally damage Magic Man's brain. In the end, the magical procedure goes awry, and Betty absorbs Magic Man's powers, leaving him normal.
195	39	"Be Sweet"	Elizabeth Ito	Somvilay Xayaphone & Seo Kim	June 2, 2015	1025-199	1.67
Lumpy Space Princess takes a job babysitting Sweet P. After neglecting her duties and abandoning Sweet P, Lumpy Space Princess is tormented by a raccoon, who seems to verbally assault her with her subconscious fears: that she does not belong in the world of creature comforts. In the end, Lumpy Space Princess tracks down Sweet P, apologizes, and finally accepts her life in the woods. Later, Sweet P tells his parents about a recurring dream wherein he was a comet.
196	40	"Orgalorg"	Andres Salaff	Graham Falk	June 3, 2015	1025-198	1.30
Gunter has strange visions after an accident. It is revealed that Gunter is really Orgalorg, a primordial chaos demon that once terrorized a faraway system of planets. After angering Abraham Lincoln, the King of Mars, Orgalorg was defeated by Grob Gob Glob Grod and banished to Earth. The planet's gravity compressed the being into a penguin, and for thousands of years he wandered for most of human history until finally being taken in by the Ice King.
197	41	"On the Lam"	Elizabeth Ito	Somvilay Xayaphone, Seo Kim, & Cole Sanchez	June 4, 2015	1025-201	1.48
Finn's father, Martin, has been arrested on an alien planet and tries to get away. In the process, he meets a little alien he names Martin II; the alien, in turn, refers to Martin as "papa". Martin tries to escape from the guards, who threaten to destroy everyone if the "rebel leader" does not reveal himself. Martin decides to sacrifice himself to save Martin II, but it turns out that Martin II was actually the rebel leader. Martin abandons Martin II and steals the alien king's gold and escapes into space on a giant moth.
198	42	"Hot Diggity Doom" (Part 1)	Andres Salaff	Tom Herpich & Steve Wolfhard	June 5, 2015	1025-203	1.55
On election day, Princess Bubblegum is more focused on a comet in the sky. Her inattention to the election leads to the King of Ooo winning and deposing her. She voluntarily goes into exile. Finn and Jake, having sworn allegiance to the kingdom, watch out for her people, but soon discover that Orgalorg has awakened inside of Gunter. While the rapidly approaching comet incites mass panic, the demon commandeers one of Bubblegum's spaceships and flies it out of the atmosphere.
199	43	"The Comet" (Part 2)	Elizabeth Ito	Jesse Moynihan & Andy Ristaino	June 5, 2015	1025-200	1.55
Finn and Jake learn that Orgalorg is attempting to absorb the power of the catalyst comet. They give chase and stow away aboard the ship, but are jettisoned into space and separated once Orgalorg reveals its true, gigantic form. Finn wills the universe to obey his wishes, and Martin appears. Orgalorg consumes the comet, but Finn jumps into its belly, wherein his long-dormant grass curse reactivates, growing into a whip-like hand. Finn's power cracks open the comet, revealing a cosmic entity (voiced by Tig Notaro), who offers Finn the opportunity to ascend to a higher plane of existence. Finn politely declines, saying he is rather fond of his life in Ooo. Martin takes the being up on its offer and disappears, and Finn and a critically wounded Orgalorg are rescued by Jake and Banana Man. The Earth's gravity once again compresses Orgalorg into the powerless Gunter.

- ^g Guest director
- ^c Creative director

== Home media ==
Warner Home Video released several DVD compilations that contained episodes from the sixth season. The first of these, entitled "Princess Day", was released on July 29, 2014. The release was notable because it marked the first time that an episode—in this case, the eponymous "Princess Day"—had been released on DVD before it had officially aired on Cartoon Network. Several other DVD compilations, including Finn the Human, Frost & Fire, The Enchiridion, and Card Wars were also released that contained episodes from the sixth season. All DVD releases can be purchased on the Cartoon Network Shop, and the individual episodes can be downloaded from both the iTunes Store and Amazon.com.

=== Full season release ===
The full season set was released on DVD and Blu-ray on October 11, 2016.

Adventure Time: The Complete Sixth Season
Set details
Special features
- 43 episodes
- 3-disc set
- 1.78:1 aspect ratio
- Subtitles: English
- English (Dolby Stereo)
- "Food Chain" featurette
- Song demos
- Animatic clips
- Production art gallery
Release dates
Region 1
Region 4
Region A
Region B
October 11, 2016
November 16, 2016
October 11, 2016
November 16, 2016
