= Jake the Brick =

- Adventure Time episode
- Episode no.: Season 6 Episode 20
- Directed by: Kent Osborne (Note: Supervising director); Nick Jennings (Note: Art director)
- Written by: Kent Osborne
- Story by: Adam Muto; Kent Osborne; Jack Pendarvis; Pendleton Ward
- Production code: 1025-177
- Original air date: November 26, 2014
- Running time: 11 minutes

Episode chronology
← Previous "Is That You?"	Next → "Dentist"
- Adventure Time season 6

"Jake the Brick" is the twentieth episode of the sixth season of the American animated television series Adventure Time. The episode was written, storyboarded, and directed by head writer Kent Osborne, from an outline by Adam Muto, Osborne, and series creator Pendleton Ward. "Jake the Brick" debuted on November 26, 2014, on Cartoon Network as the third episode to be aired as part of the "Corn-Ooo-copia"—a week of all-new Adventure Time premieres.

The series follows the adventures of Finn (voiced by Jeremy Shada), a human boy, and his best friend and adoptive brother Jake (voiced by John DiMaggio), a dog with magical powers to change shape and grow and shrink at will. In this episode, Jake tries to fulfill a bizarre lifelong ambition of being a brick inside a shack as it collapses. Finn, being supportive, leaves a walkie talkie with Jake, who absentmindedly begins to narrate the events around him. Finn and BMO are drawn into Jake's storytelling, and Finn uses Starchy's radio station to broadcast Jake's narration of the trials and tribulations of a rabbit. All of Ooo is soon engrossed in the radio broadcast, unbeknownst to Jake.

"Jake the Brick" was based on a doodle made by Tom Herpich during a game of exquisite corpse, making it one of the few episodes of Adventure Time to have been developed out of the game. Osborne and the production crew were so amused by Herpich's drawing that they decided to build an episode in order to showcase it. The episode was viewed by 2.00 million viewers. The episode also was met with mostly positive critical reception, with many commenters appreciating its simplistic and calm nature. In 2015, it won a Primetime Emmy Award for Short-format Animation.

== Plot ==
Finn wanders all over Ooo until he manages to locate Jake, who is fulfilling a bizarre lifelong ambition of being a brick inside a shack as it collapses. Finn expresses his support, but decides to head back to the Tree Fort. He leaves a walkie talkie with Jake. After a period of time passes, Jake begins absentmindedly narrating the events around him. Finn and BMO are drawn into Jake's storytelling, and Finn uses Starchy's radio station to broadcast Jake's narration.

Jake focuses his attention on the trials and tribulations of a rabbit. First, the rabbit is tormented by a rogue deer. Then, a storm threatens to destroy his home. But luckily, the rabbit enlists the aid of a friendly sea lard and several beavers, and together, the animals are able to rebuild the rabbit's home. While Jake narrates, the entirety of Ooo tunes into the broadcast and becomes engrossed in the tale of the rabbit, unbeknownst to Jake.

== Production ==
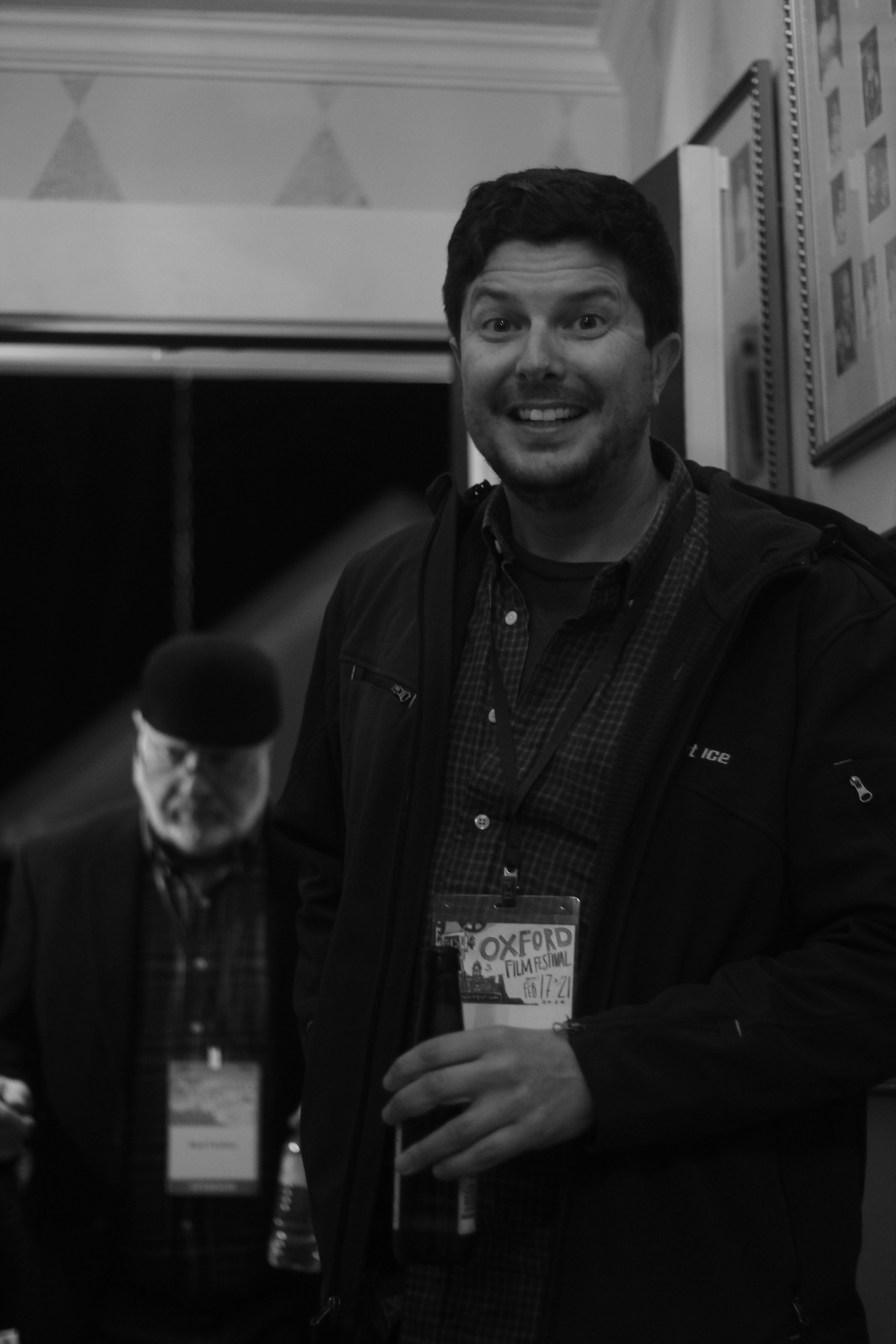
The episode was storyboarded by Adventure Time head writer Kent Osborne.

"Jake the Brick" was written and storyboarded by Adventure Time head writer Kent Osborne, from a story by Adam Muto, Osborne, Jack Pendarvis, and series creator Pendleton Ward. Osborne also served as the episode's supervising director, while the art direction was helmed by Nick Jennings. The genesis for the episode can be traced back to a drawing made during a game of exquisite corpse by Tom Herpich. The quick doodle, which featured Finn offering a brick-shaped Jake a sandwich, was accompanied by a short plot synopsis involving Jake's son Kim Kil Whan. The plot was never used, but Osborne and the crew found the drawing so amusing that they decided to work it into an episode. In reality, "Jake the Brick" was one of the few episodes to have been generated from a game of exquisite corpse. According to Ward, most of the ideas that come from the game are "terrible". A large portion of the dialogue used in the final episode was written by Pendarvis.

== Reception ==
"Jake the Brick" aired on November 26, 2014 on Cartoon Network and was the third episode to air during the "Corn-Ooo-copia"—a week of all-new Adventure Time premieres. It was seen by 2.00 million viewers and scored a 0.4 Nielsen rating in the 18- to 49-year-old demographic. Nielsen ratings are audience measurement systems that determine the audience size and composition of television programming in the United States, which means that the episode was seen by 0.4 percent of all households aged 18 to 49 years old were watching television at the time of the episode's airing.

The episode also was met with mostly positive critical reception, with many commenters appreciating its simplistic and calm nature. Oliver Sava of The A.V. Club awarded the episode a "B", calling it a "satisfying episode." He applauded the way that Osborne took the episode's fairly simple plot structure and framed it around an emergency news broadcast, noting that the episode emphasizes the importance of radio in regards to communication; he positively compared the episode to the popular podcast Serial, writing that both this episode and the aforementioned podcast emphasize the importance of the audio experience. Furthermore, Sava opined that the episode was one of the show's more experimental outings, and it was proof that the writers of Adventure Time had full creative control over their series.

Dara Driscoll of TV Overmind named "Jake the Brick" one of the six best episodes of Adventure Time's sixth season. She praised the episode for its calm and peaceful tone, arguing that "it's a … relaxing episode [and] as you listen to Jake tell the story of the bunny … you become attached to its well-being just like all of the listeners of the radio show."

In September 2015, the episode won an Emmy for Short-format Animation, making it the series' first win in this category. (Note: Adventure Time staffers Andy Ristaino, Nick Jennings, and Tom Herpich had previously won Emmys for Outstanding Individual Achievement in Animation in 2013, 2014, and 2015, respectively.)
