= Jermaine (Adventure Time) =

- Adventure Time episode
- Title Card
- Episode no.: Season 6 Episode 33
- Directed by: Andres Salaff (Note: Supervising director); Nick Jennings (Note: Co-art director)
- Written by: Brandon Graham; Jesse Moynihan
- Story by: Kent Osborne; Pendleton Ward; Jack Pendarvis; Jesse Moynihan; Adam Muto
- Original air date: April 23, 2015
- Running time: 11 minutes

Guest appearances
- Tom Scharpling as Jermaine; Jon Wurster as Bryce

Episode chronology
← Previous "Friends Forever"	Next → "Chips & Ice Cream"
- Adventure Time season 6

"Jermaine" is the thirty-third episode of the sixth season of the American animated television series Adventure Time. In this episode, Finn and Jake are determined to reconnect with their reclusive brother, Jermaine, after Jake dreams of an encounter with him. It was written by Brandon Graham and Jesse Moynihan, who also served as storyboard artists. The episode is the first in the series to have Graham, known for his commercial and personal works in comics, as a writer and an artist.

Graham reflected on his enjoyment of producing the episode, explaining that he wrote the beginning and end parts while Moynihan filled in the middle. A show driven by its artists, Graham found that working on Adventure Time left a lasting impression on the way he writes comics—most notably, his Multiple Warheads strip. Aired originally on April 23, 2015, on Cartoon Network, over a million and a half viewers watched the episode, including Oliver Sava of The A.V. Club, who gave the episode an A grade in his review for the website.

== Plot synopsis ==
Jake dreams of his estranged brother Jermaine in what he realizes is a mutual dream. This prompts him to visit his brother along with Finn. The two are chased by demons outside Jermaine's house, where he has built a salt barrier that stops the demons from trespassing. Finn and Jake cause chaos inside the house, much to Jermaine's dismay, who tells them he has a responsibility to protect the strange and valuable items that their father Joshua obtained from the demons, who only want to reclaim their stolen possessions.

After checking the time, Jermaine rushes for the hallway and goes down a trapdoor to flip a cassette tape stuffed in a teddy bear, maintaining a force field holding Bryce, a demon like the rest. Here, Bryce has been detained since he tried to reclaim a poster Joshua stole from him. While Jermaine admits his indifference toward Bryce's grudge with his father, he has no intent to free him after all of the psychotic death threats he makes to him. Afterwards, the brothers go upstairs and fry rice for a meal. When Jermaine compliments the meal, Jake reveals that he used the salt consisting the barrier of the house. One of the demons cross through the gap Jake has made from this. Jermaine vacuums up the demon and fixes the barrier.

Jermaine gets angry and reveals his jealousy toward Finn and Jake's easygoing lifestyle, while he has to stay behind and watch his parents' old treasures. He pelts Jake with random objects—one of which combusts and sets the house on fire. Jermaine continues to punch Jake, who flatulates. This causes Jermaine to laugh and realize what hoarding these possessions has done to himself. Finn tries to put the fire out, but Jermaine—who has now come to terms with his life—allows the house to burn. The demons leave later in the morning. Jermaine's watch alarm suddenly goes off, and he runs over to the trapdoor to find Bryce crawling out while clutching the poster. Jermaine and Bryce, now at peace with each other, walk off into the woods, with Jermaine nagging Bryce for being cynical and pessimistic about life.

== Production ==
"Jermaine" is the thirty-third episode of the sixth season of Adventure Time. It was written by Brandon Graham and Jesse Moynihan, the latter of whom is a veteran storyboard artist on the show. Graham is an American comic book artist known for his work on Prophet (published by Image Comics), as well as his personal works such as Multiple Warheads and King City. According to Graham, the episode was worked on in 2014. Tom Scharpling provided the voice of the eponymous character, who had previously been voiced by John DiMaggio—the voice of Jake—in a cameo appearance. Jon Wurster supplied the voice of Bryce.

The episode is the first to spotlight the character of Jermaine, who was only shown in flashbacks and mentioned a few times before in the show. In addition, the episode is the first to use Graham as a storyboard artist. According to Graham, he came to work on the show after meeting show creator Pendleton Ward at Emerald City Comicon in Seattle. Ward had read King City and offered him a storyboarding test, as well as proof of one's ability to draw a monster and to tell a joke. Graham said that he was aware of the show since the early seasons, which his old friend Tom Herpich has worked on. The two were part of the comic book art collective Meathaus in New York City from around 2000 to 2005. The beginning and end of the episode was written by Graham and the middle by Moynihan. The crew gave Graham a rough outline of the events in the episode, from which he would make the storyboard and associated dialog. In addition to this, he designed the title card of the episode.

As a fan of Adventure Time, Graham said that having a set idea was helpful, as otherwise he would be forced cover all aspects of the episode he admires in the finished product. He described a couple of elements he put in the episode as fan art, namely BMO, even though the character has a minor part. Happy with how the episode resulted, Graham said that he likes how driven the episodes are by the storyboard artists and that "you can really tell who worked on what". He also stated that the work of the storyboard artists is similar to the "kind of stuff" he enjoys and tries to put in his own work. Regarding his Multiple Warheads comic, Graham later wrote that the episode taught him to see storytelling from a different perspective. For his comic book work, Graham entertained the idea of permitting the same freedoms with which Adventure Time is produced, such as focusing on the growth of the fictional setting apart from the story. While complimenting the Frederator Studios crew for their talent and amiability, he said he was terrified when they read through the rough passes on his computer. Later, artist Michael DeForge worked on cleaning up props Graham had designed. Graham said that it was "cool knowing that such an impressive artist was tweaking what I'd done".

== Release and reception ==
"Jermaine" originally aired on April 23, 2015, on Cartoon Network. It was watched by nearly a million and a half viewers, receiving a Nielsen rating of 0.3 for adults in the 18- to 49-year-old demographic. According to TV by the Numbers, it was the 94th most-watched cable television episode of its air date. The A.V. Club writer Oliver Sava gave the episode an A grade, describing the voice acting of Scharpling and DiMaggio as having a brotherly bond that fits with the episode. He called the episode a metaphor for having to let go of "physical reminders of the past" in order to truly escape from something, with Jermaine being the opposite of this. Sava praised Graham and his work on the episode, saying that he is eager to see more from him for the Adventure Time universe.
