= Is That You? (Adventure Time) =

- Adventure Time episode
- Episode no.: Season 6 Episode 19
- Directed by: Andres Salaff (Note: Supervising director); Nick Jennings (Note: Art director)
- Written by: Jesse Moynihan
- Story by: Kent Osborne; Pendleton Ward; Jack Pendarvis; Adam Muto
- Production code: 1025-182
- Original air date: November 25, 2014
- Running time: 11 minutes

Guest appearances
- Kumail Nanjiani as Prismo; Ron Perlman as The Lich

Episode chronology
← Previous "Everything's Jake"	Next → "Jake the Brick"
- Adventure Time season 6

"Is That You?" is the nineteenth episode of the sixth season of the American animated television series Adventure Time. The episode was written and storyboarded by Jesse Moynihan, from an outline by Pendleton Ward, Adam Muto, Kent Osborne, and Jack Pendarvis. The episode debuted on November 25, 2014, the second episode to air as part of Cartoon Network's "Corn-Ooo-Copia", a week of new Adventure Time episodes. It guest stars both Kumail Nanjiani as Prismo and Ron Perlman as The Lich.

The series follows the adventures of Finn (voiced by Jeremy Shada), a human boy, and his best friend and adoptive brother Jake (voiced by John DiMaggio), a dog with magical powers to change shape and grow and shrink at will. In this episode, Jake begins acting strangely following a memorial service for Prismo. Finn soon realizes that the real Jake has been transported into Prismo's alternate dimension. After recreating the elaborate ritual that triggered the events, Finn is also transported to the dimension, wherein he runs into a program of Prismo. This program explains an elaborate plan that will allow Prismo to be resurrected. Both Finn and Jake follow Prismo's instructions, and are successful in reviving their friend.

The episode was the second installment of the series to have been solo-storyboarded by Moynihan. On his personal website, he wrote that this was the episode that started to wear down his mental defenses, which resulted in some of his best and "weirdest" writing in the latter half of the show's sixth season. The episode, which received largely positive reviews from both The Atlantic and The A.V. Club, was viewed by 1.76 million viewers.

== Plot ==
Finn and Jake perform an elaborate ritual involving Prismo's (voiced by Kumail Nanjiani) homemade pickles as a memorial to their fallen friend. That night, unbeknownst to Finn, Jake is transported to Prismo's reality, while a doppelgänger of Jake lingers in Ooo. The doppelgänger goes about repeating past antics of Jake, dissipating into a cloud of smoke every time Finn interrupts him. Finn eventually realizes that by recreating the events of the previous night with Jake's doppelgänger, he will be able to track down the real Jake.

Meanwhile, Jake wanders through Prismo's reality, which being timeless, is replaying past events, over and over again. After hearing Prismo's voice, he follows it, all the while contemplating Prismo's philosophy on relationships, as well as his death. Soon, Jake discovers a bed, and, after falling asleep, Prismo is resurrected.

Eventually, Finn enters into Prismo's reality and runs into a pre-programmed version of Prismo; this "Plan B" was created by Prismo in case he himself were ever killed. Plan B Prismo convinces Finn to wake up Jake. With Jake having been awoken, Plan B Prismo reveals his plan to the two: while one version of Jake (the one Plan B Prismo is talking to) will return to Ooo, an alternate reality version of Jake will sleep for eternity, allowing Prismo Prime to return to life. In order to achieve this, Finn must stop himself from waking Jake up. Finn does as told, causing the other version of Finn to condense into a sword. Prismo is thus successfully resurrected.

== Production ==
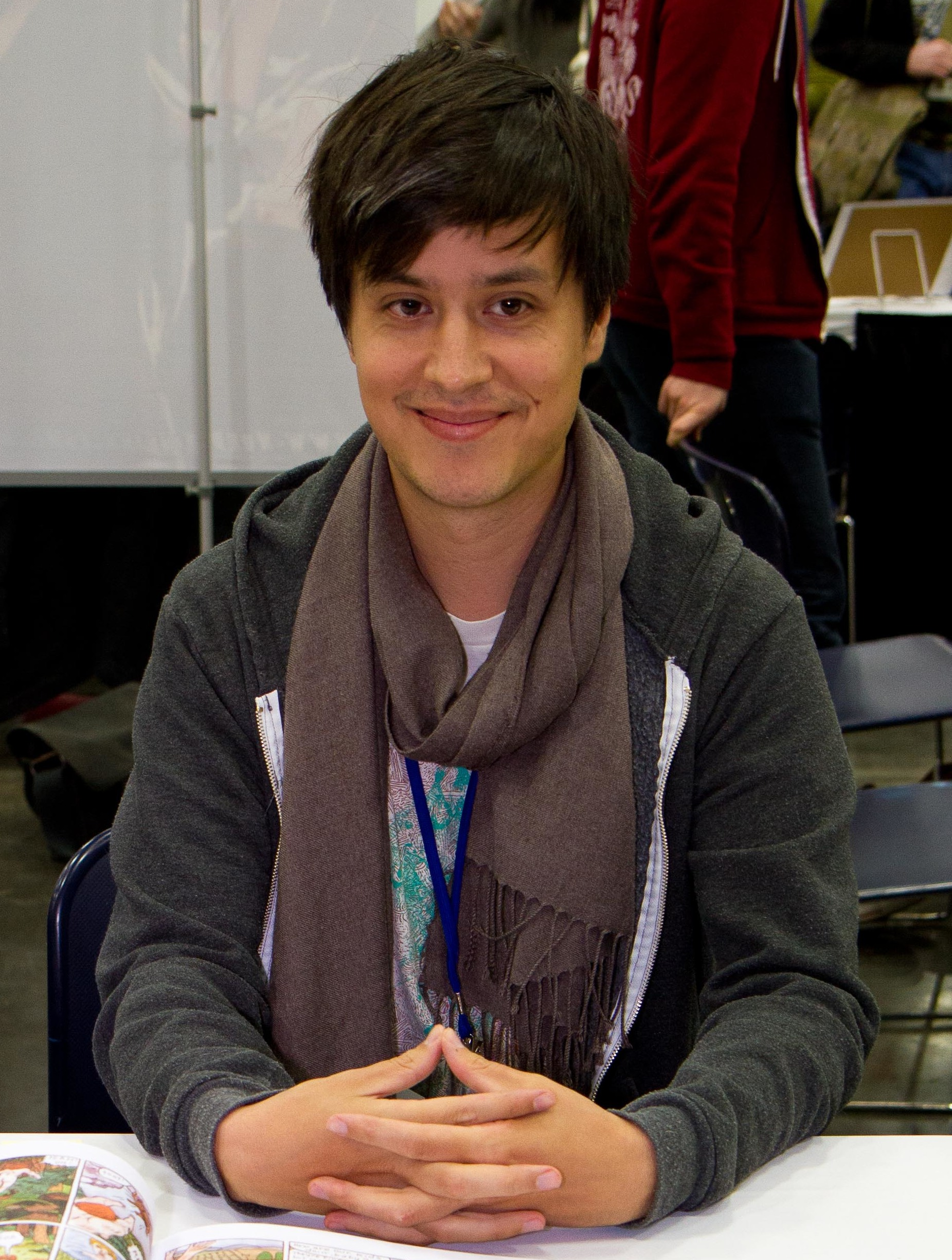
"Is That You?" was the second episode of the series to have been solo-storyboarded by Jesse Moynihan.

"Is That You?" was written and storyboarded by Jesse Moynihan, from a story by Pendleton Ward, Adam Muto, Kent Osborne, and Jack Pendarvis. This episode marks the second time that Moynihan storyboarded an episode entirely by himself, after the previous season six episode "Something Big". On his personal website, Moynihan wrote that his work on this episode started to wear down his mental defenses, which resulted in some of his best and "weirdest" writing in the latter half of the show's sixth season. Art direction was handled by Nick Jennings, whereas supervising direction was helmed by Andres Salaff.

The scenes wherein Jake's essence replays past events recall moments from many of the series' previous episodes. These events include Jake burying his Everything Burrito (from the third season episode "Conquest of Cuteness"), dancing with a Dancing Bug (from the second season episode "Power Animal"), discussing his imprisonment by Kee-Oth (from the fifth season episode "The Pit"), making bacon pancakes (from the fourth season episode "Burning Low"), talking to Finn about what happens after death (from the third-season episode "The New Frontier"), and challenging Finn to a "Tough Boys" contest (from the second-season episode "Crystals Have Power").

== Reception ==
"Is That You?" first aired on Cartoon Network on November 25, the second episode to air as part of Cartoon Network's "Corn-Ooo-Copia", a week of new Adventure Time episodes. The episode was viewed by 1.76 million viewers, according to Douglas Pucci.

David Sims of The Atlantic praised the episode, calling it one of the best television episodes of any series that aired during 2014. He was complimentary towards the plot, applauding the show's ingenuity in having Prismo resurrect himself via "dream pickles, time loops, and causality." Despite noting that the episode may seem confusing to a newer viewer of the series, Sims felt that the episode represented the series at "its very best—quietly emotional, brazenly hallucinatory, and whimsical without ever seeming cheesy." Likewise, Oliver Sava of The A.V. Club awarded the episode an "A" and concluded that the episode "does fascinating things with structure while highlighting the imagination and humor that makes this show such a delight week after week." Sava applauded the episode's use of clips from previous episodes, noting that while they do highlight past events, the result "never feels like a clip show." Finally, he was complimentary towards DiMaggio's vocal performance, and Moynihan's handling of the show's dialogue.
