= Evergreen (Adventure Time) =

- Adventure Time episode
- Episode no.: Season 6 Episode 24
- Directed by: Andres Salaff (Note: Supervising director); Nick Jennings (Note: Art director)
- Written by: Tom Herpich; Steve Wolfhard
- Story by: Tom Herpich
- Production code: 1025-178
- Original air dates: November 10, 2014 (Latin America); January 15, 2015 (US)
- Running time: 11 minutes

Guest appearances
- Pamela Adlon as Gunther; Alan Tudyk as Chatsberry; Keith David as Balthus; Steve Wolfhard as Slimy-D and Ice Imp

Episode chronology
← Previous "The Pajama War"	Next → "Astral Plane"
- Adventure Time season 6

"Evergreen" is the twenty-fourth episode of the sixth season of the American animated television series Adventure Time. The episode was written and storyboarded by Tom Herpich and Steve Wolfhard, from an outline by Herpich. The episode debuted on November 10, 2014 on Cartoon Network in Latin America, but originally aired domestically on January 15, 2015. The episode guest stars Pamela Adlon as Gunther, Alan Tudyk as Chatsberry, and Keith David as Balthus.

The series follows the adventures of Finn (voiced by Jeremy Shada), a human boy, and his best friend and adoptive brother Jake (voiced by John DiMaggio), a dog with magical powers to change shape and grow and shrink at will. This episode, which takes place millions of years before the start of the series, documents the story of Gunther (voiced by Adlon), the young assistant to ice elemental Urgence Evergreen (voiced by Tom Kenny), and how he and Evergreen try to save the planet from a comet by constructing a magical crown.

Despite being co-boarded by Wolfhard, the episode was largely the vision of Herpich, and he alone wrote the outline for the episode. Wolfhard, however, voiced two different characters in the episode. The episode was watched by an estimated 1.75 million viewers. Critical reception to the episode was largely positive, with Oliver Sava of The A.V. Club complimenting the episode's story, guest voices, and color palette, among other aspects.

== Plot ==
About 65 million years before the start of the series, during the age of dinosaurs, an ice elemental named Urgence Evergreen (voiced by Tom Kenny) created a magical crown that will grant his inner wish to destroy an incoming comet. Evergreen calls a meeting with his fellow elementals (the other three representing candy, fire, and slime) to discuss his need for them to activate the crown's power. The three other magical beings refuse as they see a flaw in Evergreen's plan if his true wish is not the destruction of the comet. This forces Evergreen to freeze his fellow elementals before seeking out three magical rubies which happen to be the eyes of a fearsome magma beast in order to power the crown. Evergreen is joined in his quest by his hopeful apprentice Gunther (voiced by Pamela Adlon), a mutated theropod dinosaur who is more like a slave than an assistant.

During the fight between the magma beast, Evergreen is nearly killed, but Gunther manages to distract the creature, allowing Evergreen to defeat it and secure the rubies. Despite this victory, he berates Gunther for not staying outside as instructed. In Evergreen's lab, the crown is completed with Evergreen adding a bonding spell so that the mind of the first possessor would be forever imprinted on the crown. But before he could use it, the blinded magma beast bursts into the room and Evergreen is incapacitated due to part of the structure collapsing as the comet approaches. Evergreen is left with no choice but to have Gunther use the crown in his place and have him wish for the comet's destruction. But once the crown is placed on Gunther's head, it reacts to the apprentice's desire to be like Evergreen. Gunther turns into a miniature version of Evergreen and begins shouting "Gunther, no!" repeatedly. This is due to the crown reacting to how he perceived Evergreen to be: a man who is constantly firing ice magic and ordering people around. Evergreen tries in vain to tell Gunther how to block the magic of the crown, but realizes too late that he never bothered to teach his mistreated apprentice any magic. The comet impacts the world, presumably killing both Gunther and Evergreen.

The scene flashes forward to the Ice King (also voiced by Tom Kenny) in present-day Ooo, who is jumping on his bed in his sleep while shouting "Gunther, no!" before making an explosion sound, signifying both Evergreen and Gunther's end. Waking up, the Ice King believes the episode to have merely been a strange dream; he is completely unaware that he actually had a vision of the events leading to the creation of his crown. Unbeknownst to the Ice King, what appears to be another comet twinkles distantly in the sky.

== Production ==
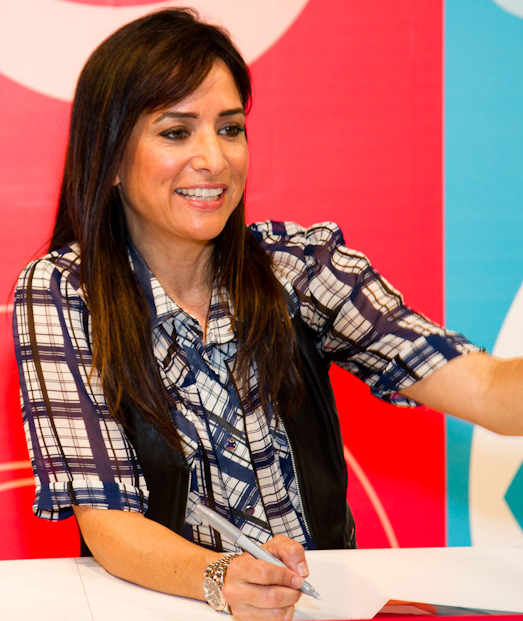
The episode guest stars Pamela Adlon as Gunther.

"Evergreen" was written and storyboarded by Tom Herpich and Steve Wolfhard, from a story by Herpich. Art direction was handled by Nick Jennings, whereas supervising direction was helmed by Andres Salaff. According to Wolfhard, the episode was largely the "baby" of Herpich; he alone wrote the outline for the story, and he also designed the eponymous character. Herpich later revealed that he was inspired to write an episode concerning the origin of the ice crown after reading Joe Daly's graphic novel Dungeon Quest Book Three, which featured a plot involving Atlantan alchemists. Herpich thought it would be interesting to write an episode of Adventure Time about the forging of the crown in the distant past on the lost island of Atlantis. Herpich's original plot for the episode intertwined this version of the crown's origin with a story about Ice King remembering the prehistoric events. However, the episode was eventually streamlined, and all references to Atlantis were stripped away.

Tom Kenny portrays the titular Evergreen, in addition to his role as Ice King. Pamela Adlon voices Gunther. The candy elemental was voiced by Alan Tudyk. Keith David, who also plays the recurring role of Flame King, voices the fire elemental, Balthus. Storyboard artist Wolfhard voices both Slimy-D, and the Ice Imp; he later noted via Twitter that they are "the only voices [he will] ever do almost certainly" on the show.

== Cultural references ==
While Gunther is running up the steps of Evergreen's ice fortress, the silhouettes of monsters can be seen frozen behind the walls. According to the episode's storyboard, these are supposed to represent "Cthulhu monsters frozen in ice".

== Reception ==
The episode debuted on November 10, 2014 on Cartoon Network in Latin America prior to its airing in the United States. Domestically, it aired on January 15, 2015. The episode was watched by an estimated 1.75 million viewers. It scored a 0.41 percent adult 18-49 rating, according to Nielsen ratings. This means it was seen by 0.41 percent of all 18- to 49-year-olds watching television at the time of the episode's airing. The episode first saw physical release as part of the 2016 compilation DVD, Card Wars.

Oliver Sava of The A.V. Club lauded the episode and awarded it an "A". He applauded the use of guest stars, noting that Adlon, Tudyk, and David were all exceptional, with the final actor "bring[ing] immense gravity to absurd lines of dialogue." Sava was also complimentary towards the decision to let Herpich pen the storyline for the episode alone, noting that, "episodes spearheaded by a single artistic voice, [are usually] standout chapter[s] of the series." Several other elements of the episode—such as its color palette, the way it fleshed-out the series' mythology, and the fact that the episode answered questions but also raised new ones—were met with approval by Sava. Lexi Pandell of Wired magazine named the episode one of the "Episodes You Can’t Skip".
