= Astral Plane (Adventure Time) =

- Adventure Time episode
- Episode no.: Season 6 Episode 25
- Directed by: Andres Salaff (Note: Supervising director); Nick Jennings (Note: Art director)
- Written by: Jesse Moynihan; Jillian Tamaki
- Story by: Kent Osborne; Pendleton Ward; Jack Pendarvis; Jesse Moynihan; Adam Muto
- Original air date: February 26, 2015
- Running time: 11 minutes

Guest appearances
- Tom Gammill as Glob; Melissa Villaseñor as Grob; Stephen Root as Martin

Episode chronology
← Previous "Evergreen"	Next → "Gold Stars"
- Adventure Time season 6

"Astral Plane" is the twenty-fifth episode of sixth season of the American animated television series Adventure Time. It was written by Jesse Moynihan and Canadian artist Jillian Tamaki. In the episode, after a comet causes Finn to astrally project, he follows the exploits of several characters, eventually floating up to Mars, where the same comet is about to collide with the planet. The episode is the first that Tamaki wrote for the show. As a storyboard artist, she praised the unique production of the show, though she described animation as more limited than comics. The episode premiered on Cartoon Network on January 22, 2015.

== Plot ==
By a campfire in the forest, Finn wonders why people have pets, describing their existence as worshipping their owners in exchange for food, water, and shelter. Before he and Jake go to bed, Finn sees a bright star in the night sky and wonders if anybody lives on it. The star is revealed to be a comet, which causes Finn to astrally project from his body. Finn is brought to the house of Mr. Fox, whose spirit sits on a chair beside him. Finn starts to levitate again, and this time he is brought to Bounce House Princess, who heads home. At her house, a porcupine enters, which prompts Bounce House Princess to enter her panic room.

Finn levitates a third time to the Cloud Kingdom, where the Ice King has thrown a party with its inhabitants. He flirts with a woman named Lauren, who seems unimpressed until he mentions that he knows Finn. After a friend interrupts the two, Ice King ends the party by freezing everybody. Finn rises above to see Marceline the Vampire Queen floating in the sky as she sings alone. Higher still, Finn encounters a family of space lards, the mother of whom spawns another child. The lards propel Finn toward Mars, where Grob Gob Glob Grod is trying to protect the planet against the same comet that summoned the spirit of Finn. Grob Gob Glob Grod sacrifices himself by colliding with the comet at full speed. The impact causes Finn's spirit to land back in his body on Earth. Meanwhile, the comet is revealed to be a spaceship crewed by Martin (of the season premiere), who prepares for a crash landing on Earth.

== Production ==
"Astral Plane" is the twenty-fifth episode of the sixth season of Adventure Time. It was written and storyboarded by Jesse Moynihan and Canadian artist Jillian Tamaki. The episode is the first that Tamaki—known for her art for The New Yorker as well as her graphic novel This One Summer—wrote for Adventure Time. She later wrote "The Diary", also in the sixth season. For "Astral Plane", Maria Bamford voice acted.

Tamaki said that her entrance on the show came after the crew, familiar with her comics, asked her if she wanted to write an episode of their show. Tamaki, who also has several friends from the comics community who work as artists at Cartoon Network, described the network and the community as close. According to her, this comes from the network wanting to tap those artists "because comics is writing and drawing". However, she contrasted the way Adventure Time has storyboard artists work on the show with artists for other shows, in that the latter group just transcribe what the writers give to them. Tamaki said that her comics career prepared her for her work as a storyboard artist on the episode in terms of the amount of drawings necessary. She learned, however, that timing in animation was less flexible, and that "there are all these storyboarding rules you actually shouldn't do in comics, because a comic isn't a storyboard".

== Broadcast and reception ==
"Astral Plane" originally aired on January 22, 2015, on Cartoon Network. It was watched by 1.8 million viewers, receiving a Nielsen rating of 0.5 for adults in the 18- to 49-year-old demographic. According to TV by the Numbers, it was the 38th most-watched cable television episode of its air date for this demographic.

Dara Driscoll of TV Overmind called the episode one of the six best episodes of the sixth season. She described it as putting Adventure Time all together, regardless of how silly the show gets. Lexi Pandell of Wired called it a standout episode from the sixth season, as well as one to watch while binging the show. Oliver Sava of The A.V. Club graded it with a B+, describing its theme as "the miracle of creation and the disappointment of life". The heaviness of this theme, Sava said, is "surrounded by goofy high jinks and fantastic visuals that keep the story light and fun". He said the visuals have "an ethereal quality that is closer aligned with Tamaki's graphic sensibility", while the animation has "the detail of her comic-book art".
