= Puhoy =

- Adventure Time episode
- An adult Finn, surrounded by his pillow family. For his character designs in the episode, Andy Ristaino won the series' first Emmy Award.
- Episode no.: Season 5 Episode 16
- Directed by: Nate Cash (Note: Supervising director); Nick Jennings (Note: Art director)
- Written by: Tom Herpich; Steve Wolfhard
- Story by: Patrick McHale; Kent Osborne; Pendleton Ward
- Production code: 1014-119
- Original air date: April 8, 2013
- Running time: 11 minutes

Guest appearances
- Mandy Siegfried as Roselinen; Jonathan Frakes as Adult Finn; Wallace Shawn as Rasheeta

Episode chronology
← Previous "A Glitch Is a Glitch"	Next → "BMO Lost"
- Adventure Time season 5

"Puhoy" is the sixteenth episode of the fifth season of the American animated television series Adventure Time. The episode was written and storyboarded by Tom Herpich and Steve Wolfhard, from a story by Patrick McHale, Kent Osborne, and Pendleton Ward. It originally aired on Cartoon Network on April 8, 2013. The episode guest stars Mandy Siegfried as Roselinen, Jonathan Frakes as Adult Finn, and Wallace Shawn as Rasheeta.

The series follows the adventures of Finn (voiced by Jeremy Shada), a human boy, and his best friend and adoptive brother Jake (voiced by John DiMaggio), a dog with magical powers to change shape and grow and shrink at will. In this episode, Finn begins second-guessing his relationship with Flame Princess, so he builds a giant pillow fort. While navigating it, Finn seemingly falls asleep and dreams that he ends up in a pillow world where he marries a pillow woman named Roselinen (Siegfried) and has two children with her. In the pillow world, Finn grows old and dies, only to wake up in the real world. He soon receives a call from Flame Princess, reaffirming their relationship.

The appearance of Finn as an adult was based on Howard Keel's character from the 1954 musical Seven Brides for Seven Brothers, which is a favorite of episode co-storyboarder Wolfhard. The episode was viewed by 2.75 million viewers and received a 0.6 rating among people between the ages of 18 and 49. Oliver Sava of The A.V. Club wrote positively of the way the episode focused on character development, noting that the episode bore similarities to both The Wizard of Oz and Captain America. Similarly, Colin O'Boyle of Geek Smash compared the episode to the Chronicles of Narnia by C.S. Lewis. For his work on the episode's character designs, Andy Ristaino won an Emmy Award for "Outstanding Individual Achievement In Animation" at the 65th Primetime Emmy Awards, making it the series' first Emmy win.

== Plot ==
During a knife storm, Finn and Jake stay in and construct a massive pillow fort. Finn, however, is feeling down because Flame Princess did not laugh at his joke, which he takes as a sign that their relationship is over. Jake says Finn is imagining things, but Finn ventures into the pillow fort to let his mind "fester". Inside, he passes through a portal into a magical pillow land. He saves a village from a "blanket dragon", and the leader Quilton throws a celebration in his honor. Finn dances with Quilton's daughter, Roselinen. However, no one knows how to get him home.

Years later, Finn and Roselinen have married and had two children, Bonnie and Jay. Quilton tells them that an ancient book has been discovered revealing that the door to Finn's world appears periodically. Seeking more information, the family travels to the oracle Rasheeta, who says only that Finn will not remain in the land long. Finn thinks of Jake and decides he does not want to leave the pillow world. Eventually, he grows into an old man and dies surrounded by family. His spirit flies through a darkened realm, encounters the being GOLB, and he emerges in the pillow fort, a teenager again. He starts to tell Jake about his other life, but gets a call from Flame Princess, who says she finally got his joke. After he hangs up, he cannot recall the life he just lived.

== Production ==
"Puhoy" was written and storyboarded by Tom Herpich and Steve Wolfhard, from a story developed by series creator Pendleton Ward, Patrick McHale and Kent Osborne. According to Osborne, this is one of the few episodes that the writers successfully developed by playing the game exquisite corpse. The episode was co-directed by Nate Cash and Nick Jennings; the former was credited as "supervising director", whereas the latter handled the art direction. The episode guest stars Mandy Siegfried as Roselinen, Jonathan Frakes as Adult Finn, and Wallace Shawn as the oracle Rasheeta. Herpich noted that he was very pleased to cast Shawn, noting, "Big thanks to [Wallace Shawn] … who I finally got to cast in the show, thus shortening my bucket list." Wolfhard designed adult Finn to be reminiscent of Howard Keel's character from the 1954 musical Seven Brides for Seven Brothers. Wolfhard explained that the allusion was due to the fact that the musical is one of his personal favorites. In addition, Roselinen's design was based on Wolfhard's wife, Leslie, according to both Wolfhard and former character designer Andy Ristaino.

== Reception ==
"Puhoy" aired on April 8, 2013, on Cartoon Network. The episode was watched by 2.75 million viewers, and received a 0.6 rating in the 18–49 demographic Nielsen household rating. Nielsen ratings are audience measurement systems that determine the audience size and composition of television programming in the United States, which means that the episode was seen by 0.6 percent of all 18- to 49-year-olds at the time of the broadcast. The episode was the 35th most-watched cable program in the 18–49 demographic on the night it aired. The episode first saw physical release as part of the 2013 Jake the Dad DVD, which included 16 episodes from the series' fourth and fifth seasons.

Oliver Sava of The A.V. Club awarded the episode a "B+", and praised the way the entry "focuses on building character". He compared the episode stylistically to both The Wizard of Oz and Captain America, noting that all three deal with themes of traveling to distant lands and "teleport[ing] to … alternate dimension[s]". In the end, Sava complimented the episode for dealing with the moral that, when in a relationship, people need to "slow down, don't freak out, and communicate." Colin O'Boyle of Geek Smash compared the episode to the Chronicles of Narnia, a series of books by English author C.S. Lewis. He felt that the installment was "hilarious" and "pretty awesome". He cited both "Adult Finn" and the "pillowy world" as highlights, noting that the former was a "badass". In a positive review of the episode, internet personality Doug Walker compared the episode to "The Inner Light", an episode of Star Trek: The Next Generation (which also starred Jonathan Frakes). Walker applauded the episode for being deep and meaningful, as well as "so funny and so imaginative".

For his work on the episode, former lead character designer Ristaino won an Emmy Award for "Outstanding Individual Achievement In Animation" for his character designs, making it the series' first Emmy win.
