= Something Big (Adventure Time) =

- Adventure Time episode
- Episode no.: Season 6 Episode 10
- Directed by: Andres Salaff (Note: Supervising director); Nick Jennings (Note: Art director)
- Written by: Jesse Moynihan
- Story by: Kent Osborne; Pendleton Ward; Jesse Moynihan; Jack Pendarvis; Adam Muto
- Production code: 1025-170
- Original air date: July 3, 2014
- Running time: 11 minutes

Guest appearances
- Jill Talley as Maja; Alan Oppenheimer as Darren; Keith Ferguson as Colonel Candy Corn; Steve Agee as Ancient Psychic Tandem War Elephant

Episode chronology
← Previous "The Prince Who Wanted Everything"	Next → "Little Brother"
- Adventure Time season 6

"Something Big" is the tenth episode of the sixth season of the American animated television series Adventure Time. The episode was written and storyboarded by Jesse Moynihan, from a story by Kent Osborne, Pendleton Ward, Moynihan, Jack Pendarvis, and Adam Muto. It originally aired on Cartoon Network on July 3, 2014. The episode guest stars Jill Talley, Alan Oppenheimer, Keith Ferguson, and Steve Agee.

The series follows the adventures of Finn (voiced by Jeremy Shada), a human boy, and his best friend and adoptive brother Jake (voiced by John DiMaggio), a dog with magical powers to change shape and grow and shrink at will. In this episode, Maja the Sky Witch (voiced by Talley) summons Darren (voiced by Oppenheimer) and orders him to attack the Candy Kingdom. Finn brings in his Ancient Psychic Tandem War Elephant (voiced by Agee) to fight back. After defeating Maja and Darren, Finn decides that he cannot give orders to the Elephant anymore and decides to let him roam freely which he does. He eventually decides to help Maja recover from the coma he put her in.

The episode, the first to be boarded entirely by Moynihan himself, was partly based on a scrapped Adventure Time television movie that was going to air in the middle of the fifth season. The death of Root Beer Guy was added on behest of Pendarvis, the voice of the character. The episode itself was seen by 1.948 million viewers and received largely positive reviews from critics with an online review courtesy of Entertainment Weekly arguing it was an example of the superiority of Adventure Time when compared to other television series.

== Plot ==
Following from the events of "Sky Witch", Maja (voiced by Jill Talley) summons an elemental being composed of plant material named Darren (voiced by Alan Oppenheimer), with whom she allies herself; the two plan on destroying the Candy Kingdom. Once the duo attack, Princess Bubblegum is able to temporarily trap them in a force field, but Root Beer Guy sacrifices his life to get it up and running. Finn and Jake abruptly leave the scene, forcing Colonel Candy Corn (voiced by Keith Ferguson) and Princess Bubblegum to hold Darren and Maja at bay.

Eventually, Finn and Jake return with the Ancient Psychic Tandem War Elephant (voiced by Steve Agee), and the war elephant and Darren engage in combat. Finn is able to dive into Darren's brain and kill him, causing Maja to hit her head on a tree and fall into a coma. After the battle, Finn frees the Ancient Psychic Tandem War Elephant from servitude; this causes him to have an existential crisis as he wanders all of Ooo. Eventually, he decides to nurse Maja back to health, but also serve as a protector and moral guide for the rogue witch.

== Production ==
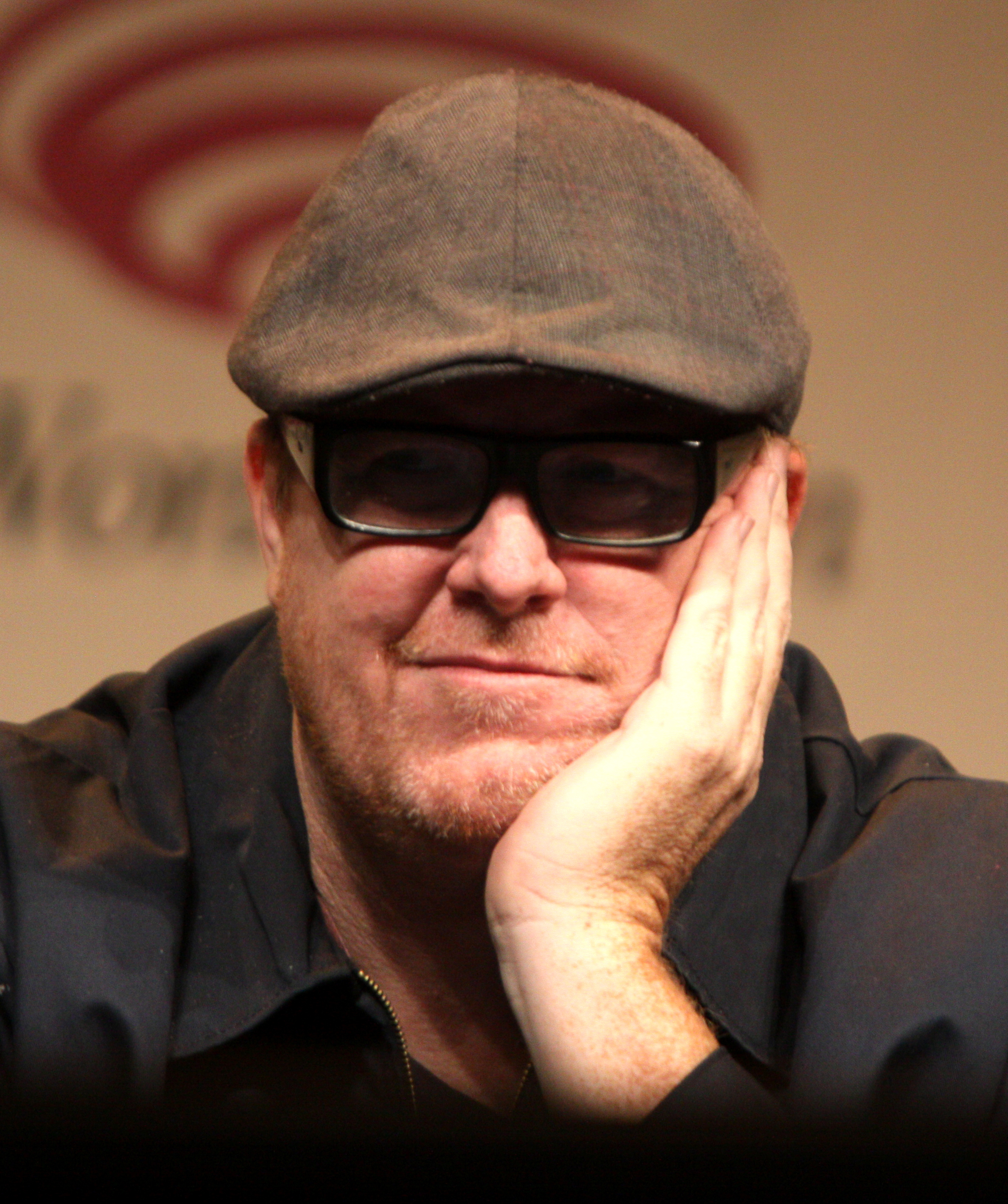
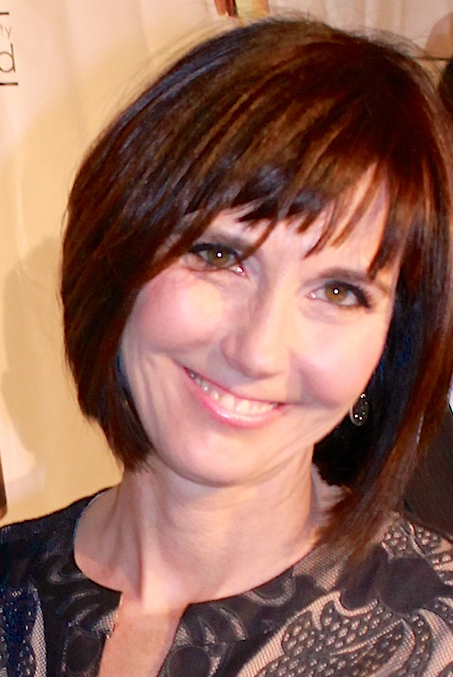
The episode guest stars Steve Agee (left) and Jill Talley (right), among others.

"Something Big" was written and storyboarded by Jesse Moynihan, from a story by Kent Osborne, Pendleton Ward, Jack Pendarvis, Adam Muto, and Moynihan. "Something Big" marked the first of three episodes that Moynihan storyboarded and wrote entirely by himself. Art direction was handled by Nick Jennings, whereas supervising direction was helmed by Andres Salaff. Steve Agee returns as the Ancient Psychic Tandem War Elephant, and Keith Ferguson returns to the series to voice Colonel Candy Corn. Prolific voice actor Alan Oppenheimer voices both Darren and the Sun. Finally, actress Jill Talley reprises her role as Maja. The design for Maja was redrawn for the episode, because Moynihan was unhappy with how she looked in "Sky Witch".

The origins of "Something Big" date back to a scrapped Adventure Time television movie that was going to air in the middle of the fifth season. The first ten minutes of the movie's storyboard were storyboarded by Moynihan, who was particularly proud of his work. However, trouble soon began to set in and the crew decided to scrap the project; reluctant to see his work abandoned, Moynihan suggested that the series cannibalize parts of the movie's storyboard to make individual episodes. Once this was agreed upon, Moynihan took his opening section and used approximately half as the genesis for "Something Big".

The death of Root Beer Guy was inserted into the episode by Moynihan on behest of Pendarvis, who voiced the character in the eponymous season five episode; Pendarvis reasoned that, because Root Beer Guy had been promoted to head of the banana guards, but had failed to improve them, his death would rationalize why the guard was still so incompetent. Root Beer Guy's demise (which is not shown in this episode, merely mentioned) was the genesis for the seventh season episode "Cherry Cream Soda".

== Reception ==
"Something Big" first aired on Cartoon Network on July 3, 2014. The episode was viewed by 1.948 million viewers and scored a 0.4 percent adult 18-49 rating, according to Nielsen ratings. This means it was seen by 0.4 percent of all 18- to 49-year-olds watching television at the time of the episode's airing. The episode first saw physical release as part of the 2015 Frost & Fire DVD, which included 16 episodes from the series' first, third, fourth, fifth, and sixth seasons.

Darren Franich of Entertainment Weekly awarded the episode a "B+". Despite calling it "a bit unwieldy", he felt that it was also "one of the most full-crazy, trippiest episodes the show's ever done." He also argued that a quote from Darren—about a dream he had in which soldiers were capable of birthing more warriors from their own blood—was an excellent example of the madcap and absurd nature of the episode. A later online review of the episode courtesy of Entertainment Weekly argued that "Something Big" was evidence that "Adventure Time might be the greatest show on television right now."

Oliver Sava of The A.V. Club awarded the episode an "A", calling it "awesome in the classical sense: 'inspiring an overwhelming feeling of reverence, admiration, or fear.'" He praised the first half of the episode—dealing largely with the battle between the citizens of the Candy Kingdom and Darren—calling it "fun" and "so massive in terms of the visuals and the situations". He also applauded the Ancient Psychic Tandem War Elephant's personality crisis, noting that it made a convincing argument for existentialism. Sava also compared the episode to Moynihan's graphic novel series, Forming, both in style and content.
