= Food Chain (Adventure Time) =

- Adventure Time episode
- Title Card
- Episode no.: Season 6 Episode 7
- Directed by: Masaaki Yuasa (Note: Director); Eunyoung Choi (Note: Creative Director)
- Written by: Masaaki Yuasa
- Story by: Masaaki Yuasa
- Production code: 1025-161
- Original air date: June 12, 2014
- Running time: 11 minutes

Guest appearance
- Minty Lewis as Erin

Episode chronology
← Previous "Breezy"	Next → "Furniture & Meat"
- Adventure Time season 6

"Food Chain" is the seventh episode of the sixth season of the American animated television series Adventure Time. The episode was written, storyboarded, and directed by Japanese anime director Masaaki Yuasa in cooperation with creative director Eunyoung Choi, and guest stars Regular Show storyboard artist Minty Lewis as Erin the caterpillar.

The series follows the adventures of Finn (voiced by Jeremy Shada), a human boy, and his best friend and adoptive brother Jake (voiced by John DiMaggio), a dog with magical powers to change shape and grow and shrink at will. In this episode, Finn and Jake learn about the food chain after being turned into its different parts—small birds, big birds, bacteria, plants, and finally caterpillars—by Magic Man (voiced by Tom Kenny). As Finn and Jake journey along the food chain, they meet another character named Erin, whom Finn falls in love with and attempts to marry. The episode concludes with Finn and Princess Bubblegum (voiced by Hynden Walch) singing a song about how the food chain works.

The episode was the second (following David OReilly's fifth season installment "A Glitch Is a Glitch") in the series to have been directed by someone not affiliated with the series. On the night that it aired, "Food Chain" was watched by a total of 1.97 million viewers. The episode received largely positive reviews from critics, and was nominated for both an Annie Award and an Annecy International Animated Film Festival Award.

== Plot ==
While on a trip to the Candy Kingdom's Natural History Museum, Finn and Jake are turned into birds by Magic Man. The duo sing a version of Mozart's "Der Hölle Rache kocht in meinem Herzen". Finn and Jake soon land on nearby flowers and eat their fill of caterpillars, until Finn is turned into a larger, predatory bird. He tries to eat Jake, but crashes onto the ground and dies of starvation. Finn and Jake are then turned into thousands of bacteria, and they consume the dead body.

The two are promptly turned into plants, wherein they sing the song "We're Plants". Finn and Jake are turned into caterpillars, where Finn meets Erin (voiced by Minty Lewis). The two fall in love and get married, only for birds to disrupt the ceremony. Immediately, Finn and Jake awaken from their reverie back at the Natural History Museum. The ending dénouement features Finn and Princess Bubblegum singing the titular song "Food Chain", which details how the food chain works.

== Production ==
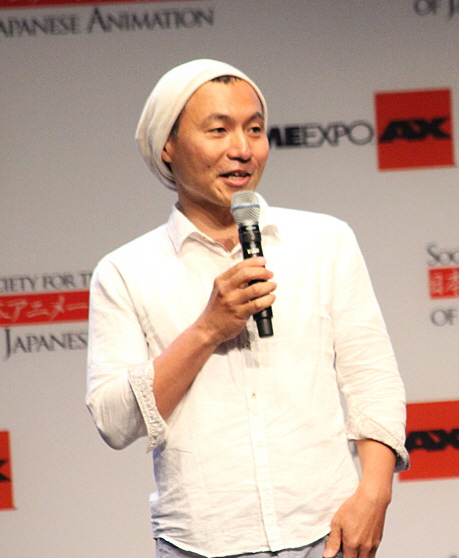
Japanese guest animator Masaaki Yuasa wrote and directed the episode.

"Food Chain" was written, storyboarded, and directed by noted Japanese animator Masaaki Yuasa, with Yuasa's longtime associate Eunyoung Choi serving as the episode's creative director. The entirety of the episode was animated by Science Saru, Yuasa and Choi's Tokyo-based studio. In an interview with The Mary Sue, Kent Osborne, head of story for Adventure Time, revealed how the episode came to be. After Adventure Time had become a mainstream success, Cartoon Network allowed the show's producers to experiment with guest animators and directors. The first episode to be entirely helmed by someone new was season five's "A Glitch Is a Glitch", animated by David OReilly. After the series was renewed for a sixth season, the network agreed to let the producers approach Yuasa. Once asked, Yuasa agreed to work on the episode, and he traveled to Los Angeles, where he pitched his ideas about an episode centered entirely around the concept of the food chain, using "big beautiful watercolor illustrations" to express his ideas.

The episode also guest stars Regular Show storyboard artist Minty Lewis as the caterpillar Erin. Lewis has had limited experience with voice acting (she plays the role of Eileen on Regular Show), but in an interview with Newsarama, she expressed her surprise at being asked to voice a character for "Food Chain": "Having never done any voice acting besides Regular Show, I was very surprised to get a call asking me to do a voice on Adventure Time." Lewis and the other cast members of Adventure Time recorded their lines with coaching from Yuasa, his translator, and the director. Unusually, the storyboard for "Food Chain" had been drawn and written out in a vertical, rather than horizontal format, as the storyboard had been entirely written out in Japanese and then translated into English. Minty noted that "it seemed like [the producers of Adventure Time] put a lot of trust in Masaaki Yuasa to make something amazing without really understanding what he was doing until he was done."

== Reception ==
"Food Chain" first aired on Cartoon Network on June 12, 2014, and was watched by a total of 1.97 million viewers.

Oliver Sava of The A.V. Club awarded the episode an "A−", calling the installment a "visual feast with a bizarre storyline". Comparing the episode to David OReilly's fifth-season episode "A Glitch Is a Glitch", Sava argued that "Food Chain" was simpler, storywise, but equally bizarre in terms of style. Sava applauded Yuasa's unique take on the series, specifically highlighting his idiosyncratic use of sound effects and music. Sava also pointed out that "Food Chain" would be an excellent episode to use in a classroom setting in order to teach about the actual food chain. The site later selected "Food Chain" as a stand-out episode from the sixth season.

Yuasa and Choi were both nominated for an "Outstanding Achievement, Directing in an Animated TV/Broadcast Production" Annie Award for their work on "Food Chain", although the two did not win. "Food Chain" was later selected for competition at the 2015 Annecy International Animated Film Festival, although it did not win.
