= Steve Wolfhard =

Canadian cartoonist

- Born: Kitchener, Ontario, Canada
- Occupations: Cartoonist, storyboard artist, writer, director
- Years active: 2004–present
- Known for: Animation, Comics
- Spouse: Leslie Wolfhard

Steve Wolfhard is a Canadian cartoonist, storyboard artist, writer, and director. He was a writer and storyboard artist on the animated television series Adventure Time and is a supervising director on its spinoff Adventure Time: Fionna and Cake.

== Biography ==
Steve Wolfhard grew up in Kitchener and then Midland, Ontario and graduated from Sheridan College's Classical Animation program in 2003. After graduating, he worked as a character designer for the series Being Ian and Kid vs. Kat. Wolfhard also did illustration work for a series of graphic novels for children entitled Zombie Chasers.

Wolfhard first started working on Adventure Time as a storyboard revisionist during the show's third season. Series creator Pendleton Ward offered him a position as a storyboard artist, but Wolfhard initially turned it down; he later changed his mind, and contacted Ward to see if he would be able to rescind his rejection. Ward allowed him to, and Wolfhard was then partnered with Tom Herpich for seasons five through ten.

In January 2017, he announced that he was writing and storyboarding on the Cartoon Network series, Summer Camp Island, which premiered in 2018.

== Accolades ==
Steve Wolfhard's work on Adventure Time gained him a Primetime Emmy Award nomination along with his then-storyboarding partner Tom Herpich for the fifth season episode "Be More".

In 2017 he received the Doug Wright Spotlight Award (colloquially known as "The Nipper") for his book The Collected Cat Rackham (Koyama Press).

== Filmography ==
=== Television ===
| Year | Title | Role |
|---|---|---|
| 2005–08 | Being Ian | character designer |
| 2007–09 | Pucca | character designer |
| 2008–11 | Kid vs. Kat | character designer |
| 2011–18 | Adventure Time | writer, storyboard artist and revisionist, voice actor |
| 2014 | Over the Garden Wall | writer, storyboard artist |
| 2018 | Summer Camp Island | writer, storyboard artist |
| 2018 | Bravest Warriors | writer |
| 2019–21 | Amphibia | writer, storyboard artist, retake director |
| 2019–21 | Big City Greens | writer, storyboard artist |
| 2023 | Adventure Time: Fionna and Cake | supervising director |
| 2025 | StuGo | Director |
| TBA | Super Mutant Magic Academy | Director |
| TBA | Adventure Time: Bubblegum & Marceline | storyboard artist |
