= Andy Ristaino =

American artist

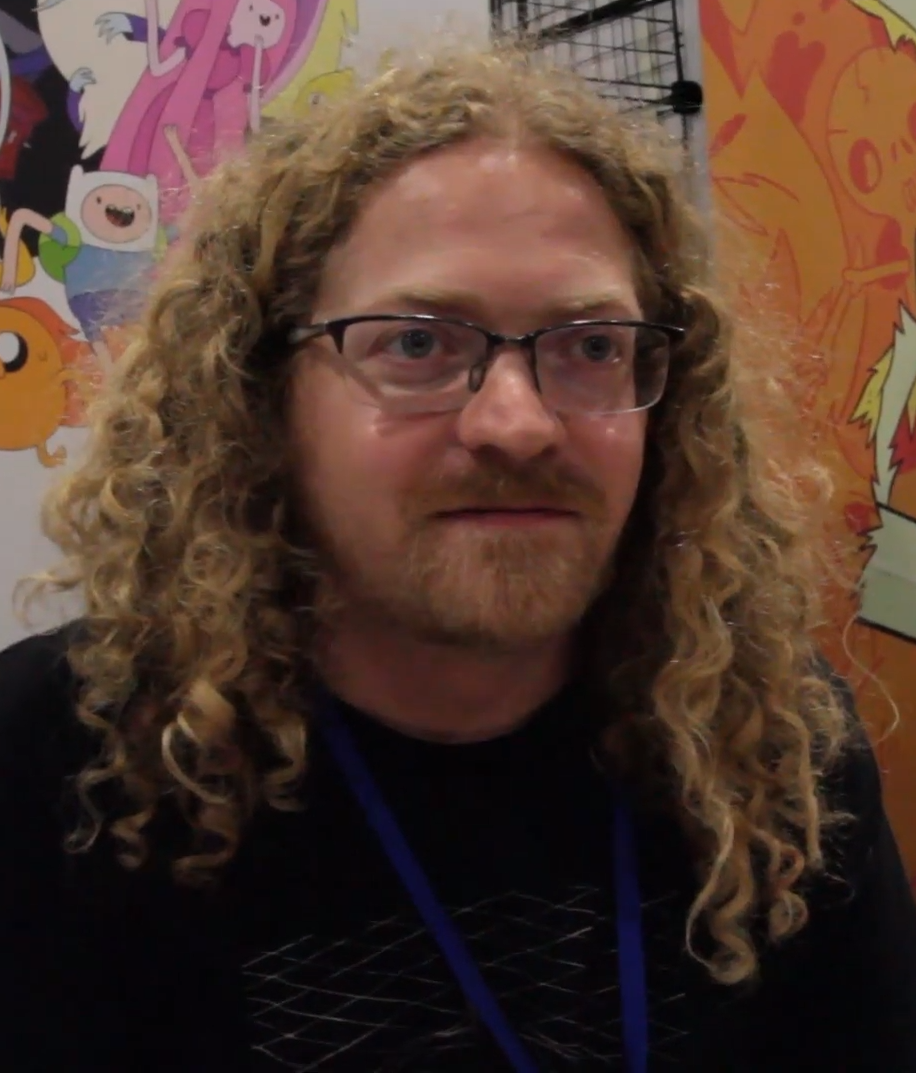
Ristaino at the Boston Comic Con in 2014

Andy Ristaino is an American artist who is best known as a former lead character designer, writer, storyboard and background artist on the animated television series Adventure Time.

== Life and work ==
Ristaino grew up in New England and studied at the Rhode Island School of Design where he earned a degree in illustration and animation. Ristaino was friends with Tom Herpich, a character designer and storyboard artist for Adventure Time and asked Herpich to tell him if there were any job openings on the show. Ristaino applied to be a storyboard artist, but failed the test required to achieve this position. Eventually, he was hired as a character designer before being promoted to lead designer. During season five, he was promoted to storyboard artist, but changed to working on backgrounds after season six. Ristaino's work on Adventure Time gained him an Emmy Award win for his character designs for the fifth season episode "Puhoy", the first time that the series had won an Emmy Award. In 2013, Ristaino raised over 20,000 dollars on Kickstarter to fund his graphic novel, Night of the Living Vidiots.

== Filmography ==
=== Television ===
Year	Title	Role
2010–14, 2015, 2016–17	Adventure Time	Character designer, writer, storyboard artist, background artist, storyboard revisionist
2012	Bravest Warriors	Character designer (one episode)
