= Jack Pendarvis =

American screenwriter

- Born: July 8, 1963 (age 63); Mobile, Alabama
- Occupations: Writer; actor
- Years active: 1995–present

Jack Ward Pendarvis is an American screenwriter, author, and voice actor. He is mostly known for his work on the animated programs Adventure Time and SpongeBob SquarePants.

== Personal life ==
Jack Pendarvis was born on July 8, 1963, in Mobile, Alabama. He used to be a columnist for the American magazines Oxford American and The Believer, and he has also written articles such as book reviews for the LA Review of Books and the New York Times. Pendarvis lives in Oxford, Mississippi.

== Bibliography ==
=== Books ===
- The Mysterious Secret of the Valuable Treasure (2005)
- Your Body Is Changing (2007)
- Awesome (2008) (illustrated by Mike Mitchell)
- Shut Up, Ugly (2009)
- Cigarette Lighter (2015)
- The Black Parasol (2016)
- Movie Stars (2016)
- Sweet Bananas (2021)
- Weird Sky (2022)

Pendarvis's short stories have also been published by McSweeney's, Nerve, The Believer, and MacAdam/Cage.

== Filmography ==
Year	Title	Position	Ref.
1995	The Rudy and GoGo World Famous Cartoon Show	Co-creator, writer, voice actor	
2007	"The Pipe"	Writer	
2012	"Fun World"	Writer	
2013	Cat Agent	Writer	
2013–18	Adventure Time	Writer, voice actor	
2015–16	SpongeBob SquarePants	Writer	
2016	"The Adventures of Luzu and Manolo"	Writer	
2018–23	Summer Camp Island	Writer	
2019	Steven Universe: The Movie	Writer	
2019–20	Steven Universe Future	Writer	
2020	Build the Wall	Actor	
2020–21	Adventure Time: Distant Lands	Writer, Additional development	
2022	Bee and PuppyCat: Lazy in Space	Writer, voice actor	
2023	Adventure Time: Fionna and Cake	Writer, Additional development, voice actor	
2024	Mystery Cuddlers	Co-creator, writer, voice actor, executive producer	
2025	The Elephant	Producer	

== Awards ==
Pendarvis received an Emmy award for his work on Adventure Time for the episodes "Jake the Brick" in 2015 and "Islands Part 4: Imaginary Resources" in 2017. These awards were shared with Pendleton Ward, Fred Seibert, Adam Muto, and several others who worked on the episodes.
