= Tom Herpich =

American artist (born 1979)

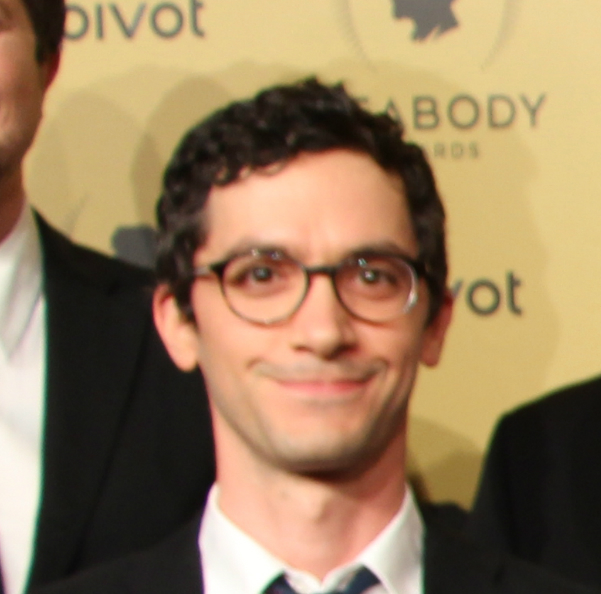
- Herpich at the Peabody Awards, 2015
- Born: Thomas Herpich; New York City, U.S.
- Known for: Animation, Comics

Thomas Herpich is an American artist who is best known for being a writer and storyboard artist on the animated television series Adventure Time.

== History ==
Herpich graduated from the School of Visual Arts (SVA), and was known in indie cartooning circles before he was hired to work on Adventure Time. He was eventually hired on as a prop and character designer for the first season, before storyboarding the season one episode "Freak City" and being promoted to storyboard artist in season two.

== Accolades ==
Tom Herpich's work on Adventure Time has gained him two Outstanding Individual Achievement in Animation Emmy Award wins, along with three Primetime Emmy Award for Short-format Animation nominations: he was first nominated for the third-season episode "Too Young" in 2012, along with his then-storyboarding partner Jesse Moynihan; he was later nominated for the fifth-season episode "Be More", along with his partner Steve Wolfhard; and in 2016 he was nominated for his solo work on the seventh-season episode "The Hall of Egress". In both 2015 and 2016, he was awarded an Outstanding Individual Achievement in Animation Emmy for his work on the episodes "Walnuts & Rain" and "Stakes Part 8: The Dark Cloud". Furthermore, his solo storyboarded episode "Thank You" was screened at the Sundance Film Festival and was nominated for a Best Animated Special Production Annie Award.

== Filmography ==
=== Television ===
Year	Title	Role
2009–2017	Adventure Time	Character designer, prop designer, writer, storyboard artist, voice actor
2013, 2018–2019	Steven Universe	Background layout (pilot), writer, storyboard artist (TV series)
2012	Clarence	Background designer (pilot)
2013	Mars Safari!	Background designer
2014	Over the Garden Wall	Story, writer, storyboard artist
2017–2023	Summer Camp Island	Writer, storyboard artist

=== Internet ===
Year	Title	Role
2014	Manly	Character designer
