= Nick Jennings (artist) =

American director, artist, writer, and producer

- Occupations: Director, artist, writer, producer
- Years active: 1988–present

Nick Jennings is an American director, artist, writer, and producer best known for his work on the Nickelodeon shows Rocko's Modern Life and SpongeBob SquarePants, as well as the Cartoon Network series Adventure Time. He has also worked as a background artist for many animated television series.

== History ==
From 1988 to 1991, Nick Jennings did the layouts for A Pup Named Scooby-Doo while working at Colossal Pictures at San Francisco.

Jennings was the executive director for The Powerpuff Girls (co-executive producer: Bob Boyle). Animation Magazine reported that the series won "two Emmy Awards along with five nominations and countless other honors and accolades."

Jennings partnered with the Exceptional Minds program where he mentored adult animation artists who were on the autism spectrum. Jennings remarked that the program helped these artists to better understand the importance of deadlines and scheduling within the studio environment, and to learn strategies for a successful career as an animator.

== Honors and awards ==
In late 2013, it was announced that Jennings, along with several other members of the Adventure Time staff, had been nominated for an Annie Award for "Outstanding Achievement, Production Design in an Animated TV/Broadcast Production." On July 31, 2014, Jennings had won an Emmy for "Outstanding Individual Achievement In Animation" for his work on the Adventure Time episode "Wizards Only, Fools."

== Filmography ==
Year	Work	Role	Notes
1988–91	A Pup Named Scooby-Doo	Color Consultant, Layout Artist, Background Consultant and Background Artist (uncredited)	TV series
1992	Trash-O-Madness	Producer	TV Short
1993–96	Rocko's Modern Life	Art director, writer, background artist	TV series
1995–97	The Twisted Tales of Felix the Cat	Background Artist (uncredited)	TV series
1996–97	Hey Arnold!	Background painter	TV series
1997	The Brave Little Toaster to the Rescue	Background painter	Movie
1997–98	The Angry Beavers	Background supervisor	TV series
1998	CatDog	Layout artist	TV series
1998	The Brave Little Toaster Goes to Mars	Background painter	Movie
1999–05, 2023, 2025	SpongeBob SquarePants	Art director, developer, background painter ("Help Wanted")	TV series
2003	Captain Sturdy: The Originals	Color stylist	TV short
2005–08	Camp Lazlo	Background artist (uncredited)	TV series
2007–08	Tak and the Power of Juju	Developer and executive producer	TV series
2009–10	Chowder	Background painter (uncredited)	TV series
2009–10	The Marvelous Misadventures of Flapjack	Background painter	TV series
2010–15	Adventure Time	Art director, supervising producer, title card painter	TV series
2013–14	Regular Show	Background painter	TV series
2016–19	The Powerpuff Girls (2016)	Creator, developer, executive producer, director	TV series
