= List of awards and nominations received by the Adventure Time franchise =

Adventure Time awards and nominations
Awards and nominations
Award	Wins	Nominations
Annie Awards	3	20
British Academy Children's Awards	2	4
Critics' Choice Television Awards	0	4
Daytime Emmy Awards	0	3
Eisner Awards	1	5
Harvey Awards	4	4
Primetime Emmy Awards	9	17
TCA Awards	0	2

Adventure Time is an American animated fantasy franchise created by Pendleton Ward, set in the post-apocalyptic Land of Ooo. The franchise originated from a 2007 short produced for Fred Seibert's animation incubator series Random! Cartoons at Nickelodeon Animation and aired on Nicktoons Network. A full-length series later premiered on Cartoon Network on April 5, 2010, and ended on September 3, 2018. The main series was eventually followed by two spin-offs: Distant Lands (2020–21) and Fionna and Cake (2023–present). Since its debut in 2007, the Adventure Time franchise has received numerous accolades, including 20 Annie Award nominations (with three wins), 17 Primetime Emmy nominations (with 9 wins), and three Daytime Emmy nominations. The Adventure Time comic book series has also received five Eisner Award nominations (with one win), and four Harvey Award nominations (with four wins).

== Adventure Time (2010–18) ==
=== Annie Awards ===
The Annie Awards are accolades presented since 1972 by the Los Angeles branch of the International Animated Film Association, ASIFA-Hollywood to recognize excellence in animation shown in cinema and television.

Year	Category	Nominated work	Result	Ref.
2007	Best Animated Short Subject	For "Adventure Time" pilot	Nominated	
2011	Best Animated Television Production for Children	Adventure Time	Nominated	
2012	Best Animated Special Production	For "Thank You"	Nominated	
2012	Best Storyboarding in a Television Production	Rebecca Sugar	Nominated	
2013	Best Animated Television Production for Children	For "Princess Cookie"	Nominated	
2013	Design in an Animated Television/Broadcast Production	For "The Hard Easy"	Nominated	
2013	Storyboarding in an Animated Television/Broadcast Production	For "Goliad"	Nominated	
2013	Storyboarding in an Animated Television/Broadcast Production	For "Lady & Peebles"	Nominated	
2014	Best Animated TV/Broadcast Production for Children's Audience	Adventure Time	Won	
2014	Outstanding Achievement, Production Design in an Animated TV/Broadcast Production	Nick Jennings, Sandra Calleros, Teri Shikasho, Ron Russell, Martin Ansolebehere	Nominated	
2014	Outstanding Achievement, Voice Acting in an Animated TV/Broadcast Production	Tom Kenny	Won	
2014	Outstanding Achievement, Editorial in an Animated TV/Broadcast Production	Paul Douglas	Nominated	
2015	Outstanding Achievement, Directing in an Animated TV/Broadcast Production	Yuasa Masaaki & Eunyoung Choi	Nominated	
2015	Best Animated TV/Broadcast Production for Children's Audience	Adventure Time	Nominated	
2016	Outstanding Achievement, Writing in an Animated TV/Broadcast Production	Kent Osborne, Pendleton Ward, Jack Pendarvis, Jillian Tamaki, Adam Muto (for "The Diary")	Nominated	
2016	Outstanding Achievement, Storyboarding in an Animated TV/Broadcast Production	Tom Herpich (for "Walnuts & Rain")	Nominated	
2017	Best Animated Television/Broadcast Production for Children	For "Bad Jubies"	Won	
2017	Outstanding Achievement, Directing in an Animated TV/Broadcast Production	Kirsten Lepore (for "Bad Jubies")	Nominated	
2017	Outstanding Achievement, Production Design in an Animated TV/Broadcast Production	Jason Kolowski (for "Bad Jubies")	Nominated	

=== British Academy Children's Awards ===
The British Academy Children's Awards are presented annually since 1996 by the British Academy of Film and Television Arts (BAFTA).

Year	Category	Nominated work	Result	Ref.
2011	International	Adventure Time	Nominated	
2013	International	Adventure Time	Won	
2014	International	Adventure Time	Won	
2015	International	Adventure Time	Nominated	

=== Critics' Choice Television Award ===
The Critics' Choice Television Awards are accolades that are presented annually since 2011 by the Critics Choice Association (CCA).

Year	Category	Nominated work	Result	Ref.
2012	Best Animated Series	Adventure Time	Nominated	
2013	Best Animated Series	Adventure Time	Nominated	
2014	Best Animated Series	Adventure Time	Nominated	
2019	Best Animated Series	Adventure Time	Nominated	

=== Primetime Emmy Awards ===
The Primetime Emmy Award is an American award bestowed by the Academy of Television Arts & Sciences (ATAS) in recognition of excellence in American primetime television programming.

Year	Category	Nominated work	Result	Ref.
2010	Outstanding Short Form Animated Program	For "My Two Favorite People"	Nominated	
2011	Outstanding Short Form Animated Program	For "It Came from the Nightosphere"	Nominated	
2012	Outstanding Short Form Animated Program	For "Too Young"	Nominated	
2013	Outstanding Short Form Animated Program	For "Simon & Marcy"	Nominated	
2013	Outstanding Individual Achievement in Animation	Andy Ristaino (for "Puhoy")	Won	
2014	Outstanding Individual Achievement in Animation	Nick Jennings (for "Wizards Only, Fools")	Won	
2014	Outstanding Short Form Animated Program	For "Be More"	Nominated	
2015	Outstanding Individual Achievement in Animation	Tom Herpich (for "Walnuts & Rain")	Won	
2015	Outstanding Short Form Animated Program	For "Jake the Brick"	Won	
2016	Outstanding Short Form Animated Program	For "The Hall of Egress"	Nominated	
2016	Outstanding Individual Achievement in Animation	Jason Kolowski (for "Bad Jubies")	Won	
2016	Outstanding Individual Achievement in Animation	Tom Herpich (for "Stakes Part 8: The Dark Cloud")	Won	
2017	Outstanding Short Form Animated Program	For "Islands Part 4: Imaginary Resources"	Won	
2018	Outstanding Short Form Animated Program	For "Ring of Fire"	Nominated	
2018	Outstanding Individual Achievement in Animation	Lindsay Small-Butera (for "Ketchup")	Won	
2019	Outstanding Animated Program	For "Come Along with Me"	Nominated	

=== TCA Awards ===
The TCA Awards are awards presented by the Television Critics Association in recognition of excellence in television.

Year	Category	Nominated work	Result	Ref.
2013	Outstanding Achievement in Youth Programming	Adventure Time	Nominated	
2014	Outstanding Achievement in Youth Programming	Adventure Time	Nominated	

=== Various other awards and nominations ===
Year	Award	Category	Nominated work	Result	Ref.
2012	Kids' Choice Awards Mexico	Favorite Cartoon	Adventure Time	Nominated	
2012	Kids' Choice Awards Argentina	Favorite Cartoon	Adventure Time	Nominated	
2013	Kidscreen Award	Children's Programming	Adventure Time	Nominated	
2013	Teen Choice Awards	Choice Animated Series	Adventure Time	Nominated	
2013	Golden Reel Awards	Sound Effects, Foley, Dialogue, and ADR Animation in Television	For "Card Wars"	Won	
2013	Sundance Film Festival	Animated Short Film	For "Thank You"	Nominated	
2013	Annecy International Animated Film Festival	TV series	For "Princess Cookie"	Nominated	
2014	Kids' Choice Awards	Favorite Cartoon	Adventure Time	Nominated	
2014	Kids' Choice Awards Colombia	Favorite Animated Series	Adventure Time	Nominated	
2014	Kids' Choice Awards Mexico	Favorite Animated Series	Adventure Time	Nominated	
2014	Teen Choice Awards	Choice Animated Series	Adventure Time	Nominated	
2014	Hall of Game Awards	Most Valuable Cartoon	Adventure Time	Won	
2014	Hall of Game Awards	Best Cartoon Boogie	Finn the Human	Nominated	
2015	Pixel Award	Best Television Website	Finn and Jake's Big Adventure	Won	
2015	Teen Choice Awards	Choice Animated Series	Adventure Time	Nominated	
2015	Kids' Choice Awards	Favorite Cartoon	Adventure Time	Nominated	
2015	Kids' Choice Awards Mexico	Favorite Cartoon	Adventure Time	Nominated	
2015	Kidscreen Award	Children's Programming	Adventure Time	Won	
2015	Peabody Award	Children's Programming	Adventure Time	Won	
2015	Kerrang! Award	Best TV Show	Adventure Time	Won	
2015	Annecy International Animated Film Festival	TV film	For "Food Chain"	Nominated	
2015	Ottawa International Animation Festival	Series for Kids	For "The Tower"	Nominated	
2016	Kerrang! Award	Best TV Show	Adventure Time	Nominated	
2017	Common Sense Media	The Common Sense Seal	For Islands	Won	

== Distant Lands (2020–21) ==
=== Daytime Emmy Awards ===
The Daytime Emmy Award is an American award bestowed by the National Academy of Television Arts and Sciences (NATAS) in recognition of excellence in American daytime television programming.

Year	Category	Nominated work	Result	Ref.
2021	Outstanding Special Class Daytime Animated Series	For "Obsidian"	Nominated	
2021	Outstanding Writing Team for a Daytime Animated Program	For "Obsidian"	Nominated	
2021	Outstanding Original Song for a Preschool, Children’s or Animated Program	For "Monster"	Nominated	

=== Various other awards and nominations ===
Year	Award	Category	Nominated work	Result	Ref.
2021	Kidscreen Award	Best One-Off, Special or TV Movie	For "BMO"	Won	
2021	GLAAD Media Award	Outstanding Kids & Family Programming	For "Obsidian"	Nominated	
2021	Annual Gay Emmy	Outstanding Animated Series	For "Obsidian"	Nominated	

== Fionna and Cake (2023–present) ==
=== Annie Awards ===
Year	Category	Nominated work	Result	Ref.
2024	Outstanding Achievement for Character Animation in an Animated Television / Broadcast Production	Alex Small-Butera (for "The Winter King")	Nominated	

=== Primetime Emmy Awards ===
Year	Category	Nominated work	Result	Ref.
2024	Outstanding Individual Achievement in Animation	Alex Small-Butera (for "The Winter King")	Won	

=== Various other awards and nominations ===
Year	Award	Category	Nominated work	Result	Ref.
2024	GLAAD Media Award	Outstanding Kids and Family Programming - Animated	Adventure Time: Fionna and Cake	Nominated	
2024	Women's Image Network Award	Best Animated Program	For "The Star"	Nominated	
2024	The ReFrame Stamp	2023-24 ReFrame Stamp	Adventure Time: Fionna and Cake	Won	
2026	37th GLAAD Media Awards	Outstanding Kids and Family Programming - Animated	Adventure Time: Fionna and Cake	Won	

== Adventure Time comic books ==
=== Eisner Awards ===
The Will Eisner Comic Industry Awards, commonly shortened to the Eisner Awards, are prizes given for creative achievement in American comic books.

Year	Category	Nominated work	Result	Ref.
2013	Best New Series	Adventure Time comic	Nominated	
2013	Best Publication for Kids	Adventure Time comic	Won	
2013	Best Publication for Teens	Adventure Time: Marceline and the Scream Queens	Nominated	
2014	Best Lettering	Britt Wilson	Nominated	
2018	Best Short Story	"Forgotten Princess", by Phillip Kennedy Johnson and Antonio Sandoval	Nominated	

=== Harvey Awards ===
The Harvey Awards are given for achievement in comic books.

Year	Category	Nominated work	Result	Ref.
2013	Best Original Graphic Publication for Younger Readers	Adventure Time comic	Won	
2013	Special Award for Humor in Comics	Ryan North	Won	
2014	Best Original Graphic Publication for Younger Readers	Adventure Time comic	Won	
2014	Special Award for Humor in Comics	Ryan North	Won	
