= Orb (Adventure Time) =

- Adventure Time episode
- Episode no.: Season 9 Episode 1
- Directed by: Elizabeth Ito (Note: Supervising director); Sandra Lee (Note: Art director)
- Written by: Adam Muto; Aleks Sennwald
- Story by: Ashly Burch; Adam Muto; Kent Osborne; Jack Pendarvis
- Production code: 1042-259
- Original air date: April 21, 2017

Episode chronology
| ← Previous "Islands Part 8: The Light Cloud" | Next → "Elements Part 1: Skyhooks" |
- Adventure Time season 9

Orb is the first episode of the ninth season of the American animated series Adventure Time. The episode was written and storyboarded and Aleks Sennwald. The episode debuted on April 21, 2017.

The series follows the adventures of Finn (voiced by Jeremy Shada), a human boy, and his best friend and adoptive brother Jake (voiced by John DiMaggio), a dog with magical powers to change shape and grow and shrink at will. In the episode, Finn, Jake, and BMO are returning to Ooo from Founder's Island when they fall asleep and start dreaming. Their dreams are soon influenced by a mysterious orb.

Orb—which served as a transition between the two miniseries Islands and Elements—aired as part of Adventure Time's ninth season.

== Plot ==
Returning home from their adventure overseas, Finn, Jake and BMO eat a lot of bananas and take a nap. A mysterious black orb in the sky begins to subject them to strange dreams which quickly become nightmarish. Their nightmares intertwine as they realize that they are dreaming, and they meet a being whom Finn names Nightmare Princess. The entity only wants their bananas, but BMO strikes a bargain so they get something in return. The group wakes up to the orb taking some of their bananas, and it leaves a pink vial of nightmare juice. BMO looks through the telescope to discover that Ooo has changed radically, although the robot is oblivious to it.

== Reception ==
"Orb" was seen in the United States by 0.28 million viewers. Oliver Sava of The A.V. Club reviewed this episode, giving it a B+. He says that the episode is "all about transitions".
