= Adventure Time season 9 =

Season of television series

Adventure Time
- Season 9
- Region B Blu-ray case
- Showrunner: Adam Muto
- Starring: Jeremy Shada; John DiMaggio
- No. of episodes: 14

Release
- Original network: Cartoon Network
- Original release: April 21 – July 21, 2017

Season chronology
- ← Previous; Season 8 Next → Season 10

The ninth season of Adventure Time, an American animated television series created by Pendleton Ward, premiered on the Cartoon Network on April 21, 2017, and concluded on July 21, 2017. The season follows the adventures of Finn (a human boy) and his best friend and adoptive brother, Jake, a dog with magical powers to change shape and size at will. Finn and Jake live in the post-apocalyptic Land of Ooo, where they interact with the other main characters of the show: Princess Bubblegum, The Ice King, Marceline the Vampire Queen, Lumpy Space Princess, BMO, and Flame Princess.

During this season the miniseries Elements aired, which follows Finn, Jake, and BMO after they return home to discover that extreme elemental magic has turned Ooo into a dystopia. Finn and Jake join Ice King (voiced by Tom Kenny), Betty (voiced by Felicia Day), and Lumpy Space Princess (voiced by Pendleton Ward) to set things straight. The season also features guest animators Alex and Lindsay Small-Butera, who worked on "Ketchup".

It began with "Orb", which was watched by 0.71 million viewers (a decrease from the previous-season finale, "Islands Part 8: The Light Cloud", which was seen by one million viewers). The ninth-season finale, "Three Buckets", was watched by 0.85 million (the lowest-rated Adventure Time season finale at the time). Critical reception of the season was mainly positive, with the episodes making up Elements largely well received. For her work on the episode "Ketchup", Lindsay Small-Butera won an Emmy Award for Outstanding Individual Achievement in Animation at the 70th Primetime Emmy Awards. A set containing the entire season was released on September 4, 2018.

== Development ==
=== Concept ===
The series follows the adventures of Finn the Human (a boy) and his best friend, Jake, a dog with magical powers to change shape, grow, and shrink at will. Finn and Jake live in the post-apocalyptic Land of Ooo, where they interact with the other major characters: Princess Bubblegum, the Ice King, Marceline the Vampire Queen, Lumpy Space Princess, BMO, and Flame Princess. Common storylines revolve around Finn and Jake discovering strange creatures, dealing with the antagonistic-but-misunderstood Ice King, and battling monsters to help others. Multi-episode story arcs for this season include Finn and Jake undoing extreme elemental magic which had transformed Ooo into a dystopia while they were away at sea, and Fern (Finn's grass-based doppelgänger) struggling with his identity and eventually succumbing to evil impulses.

=== Production ===
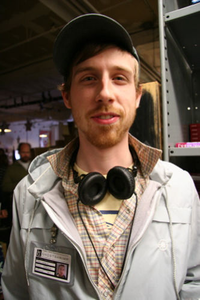
Former lead background artist Ghostshrimp returned to work on several episodes this season.

This season's episodes were originally ordered as part of the series' eighth season. With the release of the seventh season DVD, Cartoon Network began re-arranging the season divisions; the seventh season now consisted of "Bonnie & Neddy" through "The Thin Yellow Line". "Broke His Crown" through "Reboot" (which had originally been ordered as the last episodes of the seventh season) (Note: In the past, Adam Muto (the series' showrunner) had referred to "Preboot"/"Reboot" as the collective finale of season seven. This ordering of the season was illustrated by an image hanging in Muto's office, which listed "Bonnie & Neddy" through "Reboot" as part of season seven.) and the episodes from "Two Swords" through the Islands miniseries (which had originally been ordered as the beginning of the eighth season) (Note: The Adventure Time production blog announced in January 2017 that "Two Swords" and "Do No Harm" made up the eighth-season premiere, and Adam Muto confirmed that "Three Buckets" was envisioned as the season-eight finale before "the official season divisions [having been] moved around". Episodes which aired between them (e.g. "Two Swords" through the Islands miniseries) were originally considered part of season eight.) were combined to form the series' eighth season. "Orb" through "Three Buckets" (which had originally been ordered as the end of season eight) (Note: "Two Swords" and "Do No Harm" were originally announced as the eighth-season premiere, and "Three Buckets" was envisioned as the eighth-season finale. Episodes which aired between them (e.g. "Orb" through "Three Buckets") were originally considered part of season eight.) were then considered by the network to constitute the series' ninth season. (Note: On Cartoon Network's website, "Orb" is listed as the first episode of season nine and "The Wild Hunt" is listed as the first episode of season ten (suggesting that the episodes which aired between them now make up the show's ninth season).)

The season's episodes were produced similarly to previous seasons. They began as simple two-to-three-page outlines with necessary plot information. These outlines were then given to storyboard artists, who expanded the rough outline into a full storyboard. (Note: Information regarding story development and storyboard artists is taken from the opening credits of the season's episodes.) The episodes' design and coloring were done at Cartoon Network Studios in Burbank, California, and Rough Draft Korea or Saerom Animation created the animation in South Korea. Continuing a tradition which began with the fifth-season episode "A Glitch Is a Glitch", this season also featured guest animators. "Ketchup"'s animation is by Alex and Lindsay Small-Butera, a husband-and-wife team known for their web series Baman Piderman. The Small-Buteras had previously contributed animation to the eighth-season episode, "Beyond the Grotto".

The season's main storyline writers included Jack Pendarvis, Adam Muto, Ashly Burch, Osborne, and Julia Pott. According to Pendarvis, after Burch left following the eighth season "Julia parachuted in at perhaps the most mind-boggling moment in the sweeping arc of the series just totally undaunted, and showed incredible spirit and ingeniousness that encouraged us to press forward." Ghostshrimp, the series' former lead background designer, returned to work on background pieces for "Abstract", "Fionna and Cake and Fionna", and "Whispers". (Note: Information regarding background art is taken from the end credits of the episodes "Abstract", "Fionna and Cake and Fionna", and "Whispers".) Ghostshrimp left the show after the fourth season, but returned to draw backgrounds for the seventh-season miniseries Stakes.

=== Miniseries ===
A miniseries, Elements, aired during late April 2017 as part of season nine. It was first announced on March 31, 2017, by Cartoon Network during the unveiling of their 2017–18 program lineup. Elements follows Finn, Jake, and BMO after they return home to discover that elemental magic has turned Ooo into a dystopia. Finn and Jake join the Ice King (voiced by Tom Kenny), Betty (voiced by Felicia Day), and Lumpy Space Princess (voiced by Pendleton Ward) to set things straight.

== Cast ==
The season's voice actors included Jeremy Shada (Finn the Human), John DiMaggio (Jake the Dog), Tom Kenny (the Ice King), Hynden Walch (Princess Bubblegum), and Olivia Olson (Marceline the Vampire Queen). Ward voiced several minor characters, including Lumpy Space Princess. Former storyboard artist Niki Yang voiced the sentient video-game console BMO in English and Jake's girlfriend, Lady Rainicorn, in Korean. Polly Lou Livingston, a friend of Pendleton Ward's mother, Bettie Ward, voiced the small elephant Tree Trunks. Jessica DiCicco voiced Flame Princess, Finn's ex-girlfriend and ruler of the Fire Kingdom. Andy Milonakis voices N.E.P.T.R., a sentient robot who makes (and throws) pies. The Lich, Adventure Time's principal antagonist, was voiced by Ron Perlman in his demonic form and Ethan Maher in his Sweet P form. The cast records their lines together (rather than separately) for more natural-sounding dialogue. Hynden Walch described the group sessions as akin to "doing a play reading—a really, really out-there play."

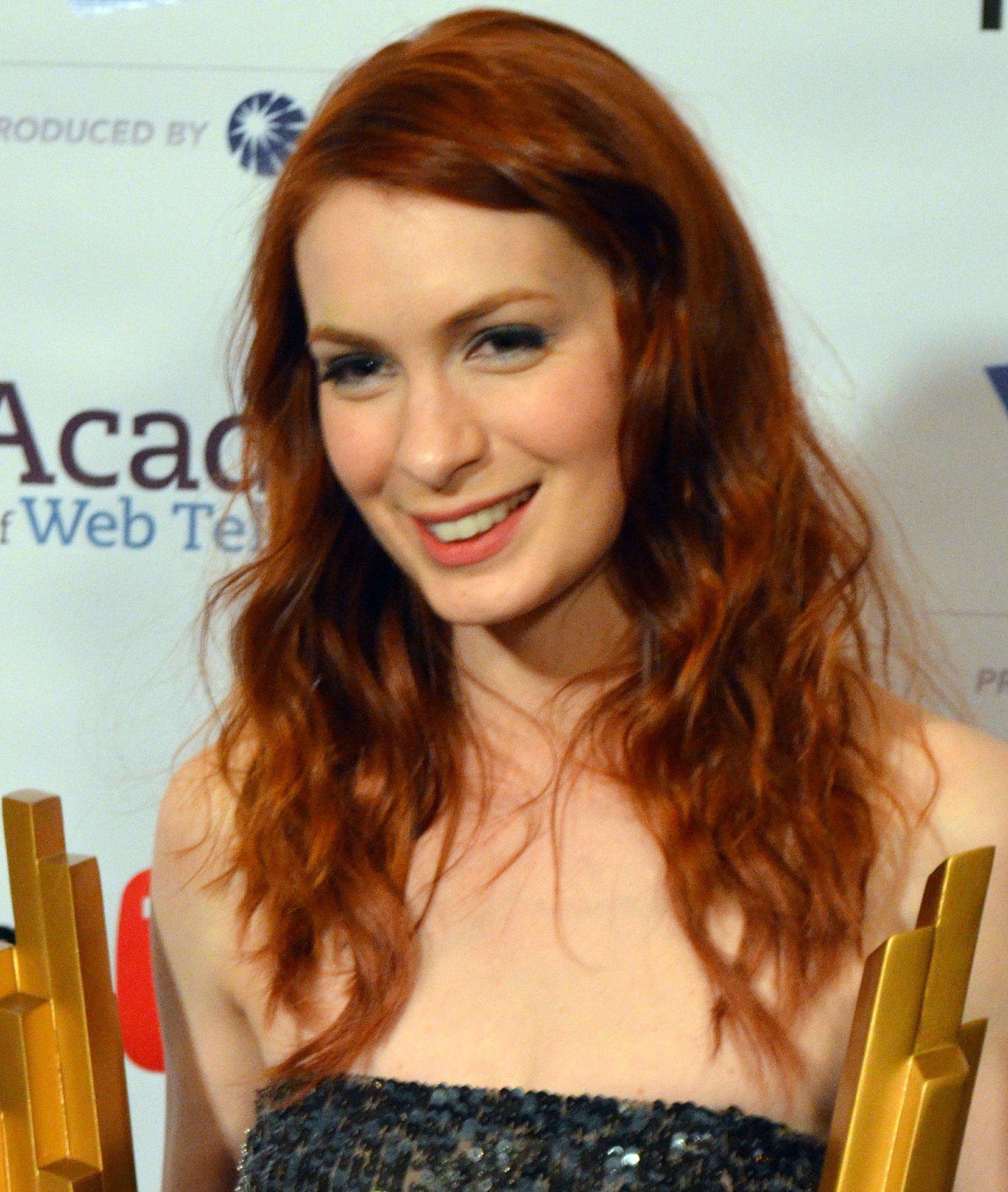
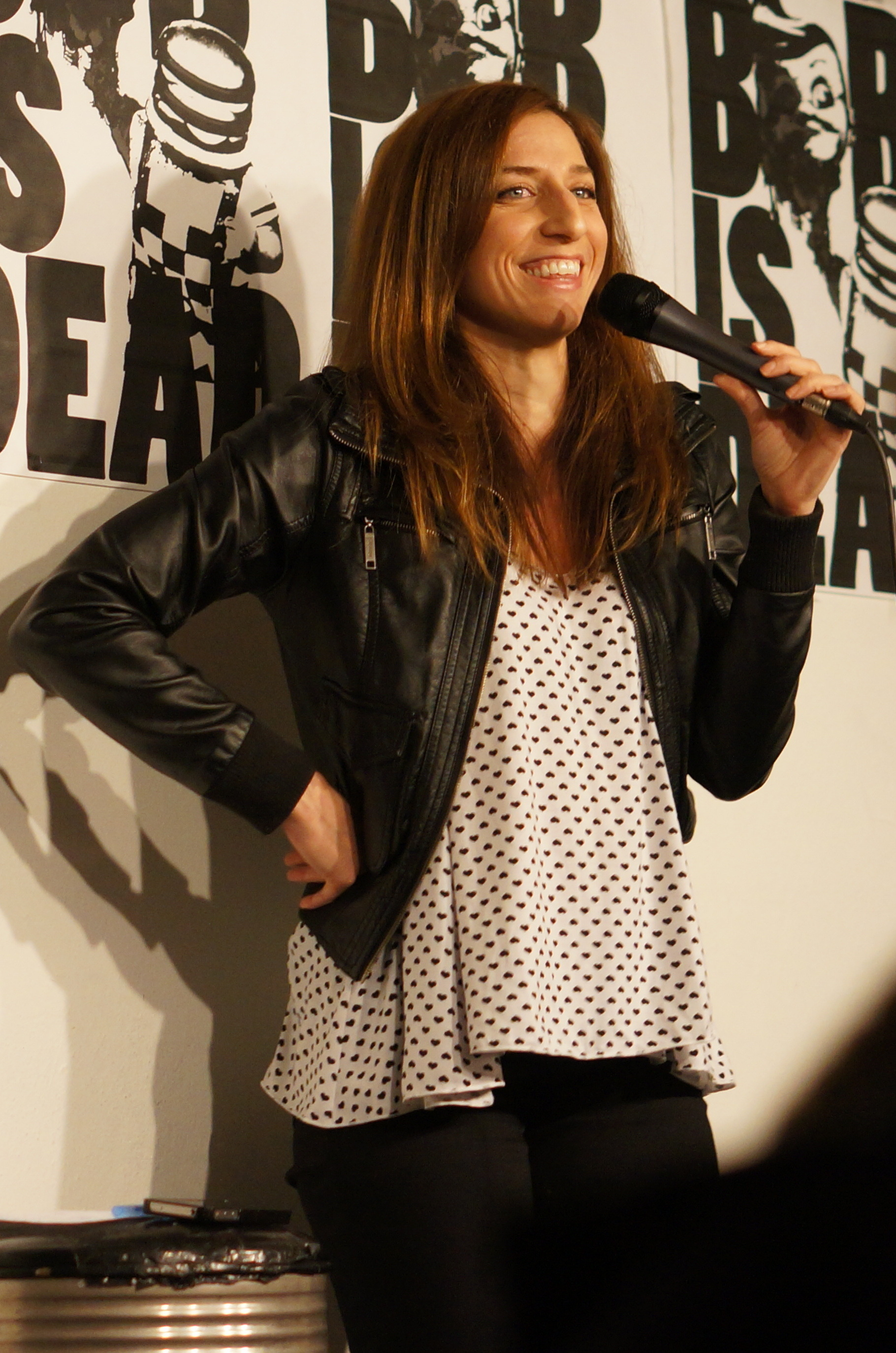
Several guest stars voiced Adventure Time characters for the first time this season, including Felicia Day (left) and Chelsea Peretti.

In addition to the regular cast members, episodes have guest voices by individuals from a range of professions, including actors, musicians, and artists. Tom Scharpling reprised his role as Jake's brother, Jermaine, and Thu Tran returned as AMO in "Orb". Felicia Day voiced the Ice King's fiancée, Betty Grof, in the Elements miniseries; in previous episodes, Betty was played by Lena Dunham). Hayden Ezzy voiced Fern, Ethan Maher voiced Sweet P, Ron Lynch returned as Mr. Pig, Lauren Lapkus reprised her role as Patience St. Pim, Dana Snyder voiced the Life-Giving Magus, Cameron Esposito appears as Carroll the cloud woman, storyboard artist Tom Herpich voices Mr. Fox, Jeff Bennett voiced Choose Goose, John Hodgman reprised his role as Elder Plops, Andy Samberg returned to voice Party Pat, and Andrew Daly voiced Wyatt in the miniseries. Andy Merrill reprised his role as James, and Scharpling returned in "Abstract". In "Ketchup", J. G. Quintel voices an unnamed blue bird. "Fionna and Cake and Fionna" saw the return of Madeleine Martin as Fionna Campbell and Roz Ryan as Cake. Chelsea Peretti voiced the Queen of Ooo and Charlotte Newhouse voiced a fake Fionna. In "Three Buckets", Fred Melamed voices Uncle Gumbald. Other characters were voiced by Dee Bradley Baker, Maria Bamford, Steve Little, and Melissa Villaseñor.

== Broadcast and reception ==
=== Broadcast ===
Much like the sixth, seventh, and eighth seasons, the ninth season of Adventure Time had several episode "bombs" in which a number of episodes premiered in a relatively-short time. The first string of new episodes (including Elements) aired between January 30 and February 2, 2017. The second began on July 17, 2017, with "Abstract", and concluded on July 21 with "Three Buckets".

=== Ratings ===
The ninth season premiered on television on April 21, 2017, with "Orb", although the episode had been released on the Cartoon Network phone app a week earlier. Seen by 0.71 million viewers, it had a 0.19 Nielsen rating in the 18- to 49-year-old demographic (Nielsen ratings are audience measurement systems for audience size and composition of television programming in the United States; the episode was seen by 0.19 percent of all households aged 18 to 49). This was a decrease from "Islands Part 8: The Light Cloud" (the season-eight finale, seen by one million viewers) and the previous season's premiere, "Broke His Crown" (seen by 1.13 million). Elements had a slight uptick in viewers, with each episode watched by just under one million people. However, season 9 was the first season to fail to hit the one-million viewer mark for any episode, which was a dramatic decrease from the often over two-million viewers the show regularly enjoyed up until season 6. The season finale, "Three Buckets", was watched by 0.85 million viewers and had a 0.23 Nielsen rating in the 18- to 49-year-old demographic (making it the series' lowest-rated season finale).

=== Reviews and accolades ===
The season was praised by critics. Oliver Sava of The A.V. Club reviewed and graded each episode with a letter grade; the Elements miniseries received a B, and the rest of the season received three Bs and three As.

Elements was particularly praised. According to Sava, the miniseries helped return the viewers to the land of Ooo and re-center and reconfigure the characters' central relationships. Smith said that the miniseries format permitted "a stronger sense of focus ... with every episode giving the sense that the story is building to a larger conclusion". Paste magazine's Zack Blumenfeld praised the miniseries, writing that Elements "is superior to and more cohesive than both Stakes and Islands, simultaneously a return to Adventure Time's surrealist roots and an emotional step forward".

For her work on the episode "Ketchup", Lindsay Small-Butera won an "Outstanding Individual Achievement in Animation" Emmy at the 70th Primetime Creative Arts Emmy Awards, making it the show's sixth win in this category. (Note: Previous winners included Andy Ristaino (2013), Nick Jennings (2014), Tom Herpich (2015, 2016), and Jason Kolowski (2016).)

== Episodes ==
No. overall	No. in season	Title	Supervising direction by	Written and storyboarded by	Original release date (Note: "Orb" was released through the Cartoon Network phone App on April 14, the Elements miniseries was released for download via iTunes on April 18, and "Abstract" through "Three Buckets" were released via the Cartoon Network phone app on July 14. However, because this field specifically refers to episode airdates, the information here will denote when these fourteen episodes first aired on Cartoon Network.)	Prod. code	US viewers (millions)
253	1	"Orb"	Elizabeth Ito	Aleks Sennwald & Adam Muto	April 21, 2017	1042-259	0.71
After the events of Islands, Finn, Jake, and BMO have just eaten dozens of bananas. Pleasantly full, they start to fall asleep. Soon, each of them has entered into their own fantastical dreamworld.
254	2	"Elements Part 1: Skyhooks"	Cole Sanchez	Sam Alden & Polly Guo	April 24, 2017	1042-260	0.83
Finn, Jake and BMO return to Ooo and discover that their home and its surroundings have been turned into candy. They also encounter Fern, N.E.P.T.R., Shelby, Lemongrab, Tree Trunks, Mr. Pig and Marceline, who are now happily-brainwashed candy people. A frightened Sweet P, the only person who is still normal, directs the three to a mysterious candy tower. The tower is Princess Bubblegum, who has become a large candy being and tries make them candy people as well. BMO is transformed; Finn and Jake are rescued by the Ice King, who takes them to the Sky Kingdom. As Finn and Jake look down, they discover that Ooo has been divided into four corrupted sections.
255	3	"Elements Part 2: Bespoken For"	Elizabeth Ito	Somvilay Xayaphone & Seo Kim	April 24, 2017	1042-261	0.83
The Ice King explains what happened to Ooo while Finn and Jake were away. After they left on their adventure, he was visited by Betty (voiced by Felicia Day); frustrated that the Ice King did not remember her, she asks him for a date and recreates a restaurant from his previous life as Simon. When the Ice King still cannot remember his old life, Betty drops him off back home. Tiny Manticore advises Betty to reach out to him as the Ice King instead of Simon, since she has changed as well. Betty returns to the Ice King and they begin playing together. Patience St. Pim (voiced by Lauren Lapkus) kidnaps Betty and begins using her magic to empower the mind-controlled Princess Bubblegum, Flame Princess and Slime Princess, while the Ice King flees with Gunter.
256	4	"Elements Part 3: Winter Light"	Cole Sanchez	Steve Wolfhard & Laura Knetzger	April 25, 2017	1042-262	0.98
Finn, Jake and the Ice King travel to the Ice World and break through the large ice dome covering its center. They see Carroll (voiced by Cameron Esposito) from "The Tower", who was converted to ice and is pleased with her new appearance. They then encounter Patience, who seems disappointed with the new Ooo. She empowered the other elementals, but they remain in their own sections of Ooo because Patience forced them to power up instead of allowing them to do it themselves. The gang rescues Betty and leaves, as Patience bemoans the new world to an iced Choose Goose. Betty says that she can help them with the power of the Enchiridion (which Finn has), and laughs ominously.
257	5	"Elements Part 4: Cloudy"	Elizabeth Ito	Graham Falk & Kent Osborne	April 25, 2017	1042-263	0.98
To calm Finn, Jake tucks them into a cloud which floats away from the Ice King and Betty. Jake and Finn float in an endless sky, and another cloud (with a door) flies past them. They play barber to pass the time, and get to the root of their worries. The cloud flies past again, and they discover that it is a type of animal known as an "Angler Lard". They use the Lard to fly back to Betty and the Ice King, and Betty has discovered how to return Ooo to normal.
258	6	"Elements Part 5: Slime Central"	Elizabeth Ito	Aleks Sennwald & Hanna K. Nyström	April 26, 2017	1042-264	0.92
Finn and Jake arrive in the transformed Slime Kingdom to retrieve Slime Princess' crown for her jewel. They see Lumpy Space Princess, who is attending Slime Princess's roller-skating party. The winners of the skating competition are absorbed by Slime Princess, and the losers are caged. Finn, Jake and Lumpy Space Princess enter and lose, discovering that they get absorbed anyway. Finn grabs the crown, but Jake is absorbed by Slime Princess. Lumpy Space Princess saves Finn, revealing that her "lumps" protect her from corruption. They are ejected from Slime Princess and forced to leave. Finn is sad at the loss of Jake, but Lumpy Space Princess explains that Finn and Jake always win; this inspires Finn to continue his mission.
259	7	"Elements Part 6: Happy Warrior"	Cole Sanchez	Sam Alden & Polly Guo	April 26, 2017	1042-265	0.92
Finn, Lumpy Space Princess, and Gunter arrive in a radically-altered Fire Kingdom. The inhabitants, which include Wyatt (voiced by Andrew Daly) and Lady Rainicorn, attack the heroes. Finn and Gunter try desperately to restrain their violent tendencies, which would allow the kingdom to corrupt them. The group finds Flame Princess, who has transformed into a dragon. When she swallows the jewel necessary to save Ooo, Finn begins attacking her and becomes a fire person. Lumpy Space Princess, angered by the violence, yells at everyone to stop fighting. The kingdom misinterprets her anger, and decides to go to war with the Candy Kingdom. Cinnamon Bun, unaffected by the corruption, frets that this is the end of Ooo.
260	8	"Elements Part 7: Hero Heart"	Elizabeth Ito	Somvilay Xayaphone & Seo Kim	April 27, 2017	1042-266	0.90
Lumpy Space Princess chases Finn and unsuccessfully tries to return him to normal. The Ice King and Betty try to intervene, but are swatted away by Flame Princess. The Fire Kingdom inhabitants "fight" their Candy Kingdom counterparts, upsetting Lumpy Space Princess. After eating some of Marceline (who is made of marshmallows), Lumpy Space Princess reaches out to Finn's heroic heart by placing some of Princess Bubblegum on him. Remembering happier times with Bubblegum, Finn returns to normal. Bubblegum then fires her candy powers, converting everyone except Finn (who is protected by Lumpy Space Princess) into obedient candy people. Finn grabs the three jewels and gives them to Betty; she betrays him and leaves him behind, surrounded by the inhabitants of the Candy Kingdom.
261	9	"Elements Part 8: Skyhooks II"	Cole Sanchez	Steve Wolfhard	April 27, 2017	1042-267	0.90
Betty knocks out the Ice King and says that she wants to use the jewels to go back in time and prevent Simon from transforming into the Ice King. The Ice King, oblivious to her plans, accidentally ruins her spell; this causes her to be transported to Mars, where she meets Normal Man. Lumpy Space Princess rescues Finn from the candy people; Princess Bubblegum enacts her plan to convert the rest of Ooo into candy, while Patience freezes herself again. Finn realizes that Lumpy Space Princess's immunity means that she is the anti-elemental. The Ice King arrives with the gems, and Lumpy Space Princess returns Ooo to normal. Jake returns (resembling his blue shape-shifter parent), but Finn is happy to be reunited with his brother.
262	10	"Abstract"	Adam Muto	Graham Falk & Laura Knetzger	July 17, 2017	1042-268	0.77
Finn, BMO and Lady Rainicorn are somewhat disturbed by Jake's new, alien appearance, but Jake seems oblivious (or in denial). After Jake has a bizarre dream about Jermaine (voiced by Tom Scharpling) painting abstract art (which, according to Jake, he hates), he decides to look for him. Jake traverses the wasteland until he finds Jermaine's studio. He tries to keep Jermaine from changing, but Jermaine convinces him that change is good as long as you remain the same on the inside. After examining (and taking home) one of Jermaine's paintings, Jake discovers that he has returned to normal and is greeted by a very-pleased Finn.
263	11	"Ketchup"	Elizabeth Ito (Note: Three sequences in this episode were animated and directed by Alex & Lindsay Small-Butera.)	Somvilay Xayaphone & Seo Kim	July 18, 2017	1042-271	0.67
Marceline is unexpectedly visited by BMO, who is asked to download a USB drive. While they wait, BMO tells the story of it, Finn and Jake traveling the seas; the mostly-inaccurate story involves a cat named Ted and a blue jay (voiced by J. G. Quintel). Marcy then tells the story of "Lollipop Girl" and "Rock Star Girl" and their encounter with a "Blue Tranch", which resulted in "Weekend Island" being taken over by potatoes. When the USB drive downloads, it reveals pictures of young Marcy with her mother. She pretends not to know them, and asks BMO to tell their story: a tale about "the Child and the Moon Girl", for which Marcy is grateful.
264	12	"Fionna and Cake and Fionna"	Elizabeth Ito	Aleks Sennwald & Hanna K. Nyström	July 19, 2017	1042-269	0.69
At a Fionna and Cake book reading by the Ice King, an old woman claiming to be Fionna (voiced by Charlotte Newhouse) arrives with a tape of an early Fionna and Cake adventure. The Ice King, enamored by "Fionna", invites her to stay with him. At night the Ice King watches the remainder of the tape, where Fionna and Cake find a mummy (voiced by Chelsea Peretti), who is actually the Queen of Ooo. The Ice King misinterprets the video, and thinks that "Fionna" is a mummy. He confronts her, and discovers that she was looking for more Fionna and Cake tapes; however, the Ice King has no more. "Fionna" is a bunny who picked up Fionna and Cake signals and wanted more; when she realizes what she has done, she flees. Later that night, a mysterious beam containing clips of Fionna and Cake adventures is sent to the Ice King while he sleeps.
265	13	"Whispers"	Cole Sanchez	Sam Alden & Polly Guo	July 20, 2017	1042-270	0.76
Finn and Fern encounter Sweet P, who was running away from home after having a nightmare, while they are fishing. Sweet P says that he has been having visions of a "whisper monster", who tries to tell him that he is evil. Finn and Fern decide to camp with Sweet P when they encounter the hand of the Lich which was cut off in "Crossover". Finn and Fern fight the Lich's hand, but it escapes. Finn chases it into a tunnel and is rescued by Sweet P (he knocked out Fern so he could escape), who slays the hand. Fern, feeling useless for being unable to help, plots to become the true Finn.
266	14	"Three Buckets"	Cole Sanchez	Tom Herpich & Steve Wolfhard	July 21, 2017	1042-272	0.85
Fern reveals his ability to change his appearance to look just like Finn. Impressed, Finn joins Fern in a dungeon hidden in a mountain. Fern traps Finn in one of the rooms, and reveals his plan to replace him. Finn learns that his robotic arm can do a variety of things, and drills his way out of the dungeon. Finn and Fern fight in a field; Finn tries to reason with Fern, but his robot arm mishears the word "finality" as "fatality" and he destroys him. Finn returns home traumatized, and Jake and BMO comfort him. Meanwhile, Princess Bubblegum's Uncle Gumbald (voiced by Fred Melamed) scoops Fern's still-living remains into a bucket.

== Home media ==
Warner Home Video released Elements, a DVD set which includes the miniseries, in Australia on July 3, 2018. A DVD set which includes seasons eight, nine and ten was released on September 4, 2018.

=== US release ===
The collective DVD cover for the domestic release of seasons 8, 9, and 10

Adventure Time: The Final Seasons
Set details
Special features
- Seasons 8–10
- 58 episodes
- 1.78:1 aspect ratio
- Subtitles: English
- English (Dolby stereo)
- Animatics
- Song demos
- Character-art gallery
- Behind-the-scenes featurette
Release dates
Region 1
Region 4
Region A
Region B
September 4, 2018
TBA
TBA
TBA

=== Australian release ===
On December 19, 2018, the season was released by itself on DVD and Blu-ray in Australia.

Adventure Time: The Complete Ninth Season
Set details
Special features
- Season 9
- 14 episodes
- 1.78:1 aspect ratio
- Subtitles: English
- English (Dolby stereo)
- TBA
Release dates
Region 1
Region 4
Region A
Region B
N/A
December 19, 2018
N/A
December 19, 2018
