= Ketchup (Adventure Time) =

- Adventure Time episode
- Episode no.: Season 9 Episode 11
- Directed by: Elizabeth Ito (Note: Supervising director); Sandra Lee (Note: Art director); Alex Small-Butera (Note: Co-director of "special sequences"); Lindsay Small-Butera
- Written by: Seo Kim; Somvilay Xayaphone
- Story by: Kent Osborne; Jack Pendarvis; Julia Pott; Patrick McHale; Ashly Burch; Adam Muto
- Production code: 1042-271
- Original air date: July 18, 2017
- Running time: 11 minutes

Guest appearance
- J. G. Quintel as a blue jay

Episode chronology
← Previous "Abstract"	Next → "Fionna and Cake and Fionna"
- Adventure Time season 9

"Ketchup" is the name of the eleventh episode of the ninth season of the American animated television series Adventure Time. The episode was written and storyboarded by Seo Kim and Somvilay Xayaphone, from a story by lead writer Kent Osborne, Jack Pendarvis, Julia Pott, Patrick McHale, Ashly Burch, and series showrunner Adam Muto. It originally aired on Cartoon Network on July 18, 2017 and guest stars J. G. Quintel as a blue jay.

The series follows the adventures of Finn (voiced by Jeremy Shada), a human boy, and his best friend and adoptive brother Jake (voiced by John DiMaggio), a dog with magical powers to change shape and grow and shrink at will. In this episode, Marceline is unexpectedly visited by BMO who is asked to download a USB drive. While they wait, the two tell each other stories, leading to BMO telling Marceline the story of "the Child and the Moon Girl", based on Marceline and her mother.

== Plot ==
Marceline (voiced by Olivia Olson) is unexpectedly visited by BMO (voiced by Niki Yang), who believes that vampires are still threatening Marceline's life. Marceline assures the robot that the vampire threat passed months ago, and asks BMO to download the contents of an old USB drive. While they wait for BMO to secure the contents, the two decide to tell each other stories.

BMO goes first, describing how it, Finn and Jake recently traveled the seas. However, the story gets highly exaggerated and surreal, involving a cat named Ted and a blue jay (voiced by J. G. Quintel). Marceline then tells the story of "Lollipop Girl" and "Rock Star Girl" and their encounter with a "Blue Tranch" that resulted in "Weekend Island" getting taken over by a potato curse.

When the USB drive finally downloads, Marceline and BMO discover that it contains pictures of a young Marcy with her mother. Marceline feigns not knowing who they are and asks BMO to tell their story. BMO obliges and narrates a tale about "the Child and the Moon Girl". When BMO finishes, Marceline is moved to tears and thanks BMO for the story.

== Production ==
"Ketchup" was written and storyboarded by Seo Kim & Somvilay Xayaphone, from a story developed by Ashly Burch, Patrick McHale, series showrunner Adam Muto, Kent Osborne, Jack Pendarvis, and Julia Pott. McHale—who had served as a storyline writer, storyboard artist, and creative director for the show in its first few seasons—wrote portions of BMO's first story with his son; the two also wrote the lyrics for the song that Finn sings in this segment. Elizabeth Ito served as the episode's supervising director, and Sandra Lee served as art director. Portions of this episode were animated by Alex and Lindsay Small-Butera, a husband and wife duo had previously contributed animation to the eighth-season episode "Beyond the Grotto".

The Small-Buteras were tasked with animating each of BMO and Marceline's stories in a unique style. The palette for the first segment, narrated by BMO, was based on the "tropical" feel of the Islands miniseries. However, the Small-Buteras made use of tones that were slightly "off" to give it an "unsettling atmosphere". The entire sequence featured 24 frames a second "to heighten [its] dream-like, sweet, but eerie quality".

The second sequence starts off with a palette based on Princess Bubblegum's look (e.g. bright pink) and ends with a palette based on Marceline's colors (that is, "cool" colors, like grey, black, and dark blue). This sequence also used a number of unique shots and idiosyncratic angles so that it would "feel more cinematic and important, since it's an important story to Marceline." The idea to reinterpret Bubblegum's distorted elemental self as a potato monster was inspired by the 1988 anime film Akira.

For the final segment, the Small-Buteras decided that they wanted to animate the story in the style of a fairy tale. To do this, they made it "feel very staged" by "border[ing] everything with lush, velvet curtains to sell that vision of the piece." The fairy-tale version of Marceline's mother is wearing a dress that recalls a bird cage, since the character "is sort of a prisoner of circumstance".

== Reception ==
"Ketchup" first aired on Cartoon Network on July 18, 2017. The episode was viewed by 0.67 million viewers and scored a 0.19 Nielsen rating in the 18- to 49-year-old demographic. Nielsen ratings are audience measurement systems that determine the audience size and composition of television programming in the United States, which means that the episode was seen by 0.19 percent of all households aged 18 to 49 years old were watching television at the time of the episode's airing. The episode was physically released as part of the complete eighth, ninth, and tenth season DVD on September 4, 2018.

Oliver Sava of The A.V. Club awarded the episode an "A–" and wrote that "Ketchup" "is a great example of [of] how different creative voices change the series". Sava wrote positively of the episode's tone, use of emotion, unique animation and its use of misdirection, ultimately concluding that "Ketchup" "highlights the versatility of its guest animators and shows hows [sic] embracing different styles can enrich storytelling."

For her work animating the characters for this episode, Lindsay Small-Butera received an Emmy for "Outstanding Individual Achievement in Animation" at the 70th Primetime Creative Arts Emmy Awards, making it the show's sixth win in this category. (Note: Previous winners included Andy Ristaino (2013), Nick Jennings (2014), Tom Herpich (2015, 2016), and Jason Kolowski (2016).)
