= Elements (miniseries) =

2017 television miniseries

- Adventure Time episodes
- Region 4 DVD cover
- Episode nos.: Season 9 Episodes 2–9
- Directed by: Elizabeth Ito (Note: Supervising director); Cole Sanchez; Sandra Lee (Note: Art director)
- Written by: Sam Alden; Polly Guo; Seo Kim; Somvilay Xayaphone; Steve Wolfhard; Graham Falk; Hanna K. Nyström; Aleks Sennwald; Kent Osborne; Laura Knetzger
- Story by: Kent Osborne; Adam Muto; Jack Pendarvis; Julia Pott; Patrick McHale (Note: Patrick McHale only contributed to the story for "Cloudy".)
- Original air date: April 24, 2017–April 27, 2017
- Running time: 88 minutes

Episode chronology
← Previous "Orb"	Next → "Abstract"
- Adventure Time season 9

Adventure Time: Elements, also known simply as "Elements", is an eight-episode-long miniseries that aired as part of the American animated television series Adventure Time's ninth season on Cartoon Network from April 24 to April 27, 2017. Adventure Time follows the adventures of Finn (voiced by Jeremy Shada), a human boy, and his best friend and adoptive brother Jake (voiced by John DiMaggio), a dog with magical powers to change shape, and grow and shrink at will. In this limited event series, which itself follows the events of the Islands miniseries, Finn, Jake, and BMO return home to discover that Ooo (i.e. the magical land in which they live) has been turned into a veritable dystopia thanks to extreme elemental magic. Finn and Jake team up with Ice King (voiced by Tom Kenny), Betty (voiced by Felicia Day), and Lumpy Space Princess (voiced by Ward) to set things straight.

Elements is the third and final Adventure Time miniseries produced, following Stakes (2015) and Islands (2017). The miniseries' story was developed by head writer Kent Osborne, series showrunner Adam Muto, Jack Pendarvis, and Julia Pott; Patrick McHale also contributed to the story for the episode "Cloudy". Storyboard artists who worked on this miniseries include Sam Alden, Polly Guo, Seo Kim, Somvilay Xayaphone, Steve Wolfhard, Graham Falk, Hanna K. Nyström, Aleks Sennwald, Kent Osborne, and Laura Knetzger. Cole Sanchez and Elizabeth Ito served as the miniseries' supervising directors, and Sandra Lee served as art director. All eight of the miniseries' installments were watched by approximately 0.90 million viewers, making them among the season's highest-watched episodes. It has been generally well received by television critics. Elements was released on DVD in Australia on July 3, 2018.

== Plot ==
Finn (voiced by Jeremy Shada), Jake (voiced by John DiMaggio), and BMO (voiced by Niki Yang) arrive back in Ooo and discover that their home has been converted to candy and that many of their friends are now happily brainwashed candy people. Finn, Jake, and BMO eventually locate Princess Bubblegum (voiced by Hynden Walch), who has become a large candy tower being with the power to forcibly convert matter into candy. While BMO is completely transformed by Bubblegum's power, Finn and Jake are rescued by Ice King (voiced by Tom Kenny), who then takes them to the Sky Kingdom. As Finn and Jake look down upon Ooo, they discover that it has been completely corrupted by the four primordial elements: candy, ice, slime, and fire.

Ice King explains that after Finn, Jake, and BMO left on their adventure Betty (voiced by Felicia Day) attempted to get Ice King to remember who he really is but in the process was kidnapped by Patience St. Pim (voiced by Lauren Lapkus), the ice elemental. Patience used Betty's magic to ensnare Princess Bubblegum, Flame Princess (voiced by Jessica DiCicco), and Slime Princess (voiced by Maria Bamford), who make up the remaining elementals. Unfortunately, Patience's plan went awry, and the elemental magic she unleashed took over Ooo. Finn, Jake and Ice King travel to the Ice World and confront Patience, who is disappointed that her plan did not go as planned. The group flee from the Ice Kingdom and rescue Betty, who argues that she can reset the world with an alternate-universe version of the Enchiridion. In order to activate the book's power, however, the group must track down the jewels of power, which are found in the elementals' crowns.

Finn and Jake journey to the transformed Slime Kingdom to retrieve Slime Princess' crown for her jewel. They run into Lumpy Space Princess (voiced by Pendleton Ward), who is attending Slime Princess's roller skating party. The winners of the skating competition get absorbed into Slime Princess's whole being while the losers are caged up. Finn, Jake and Lumpy Space Princess enter, but lose, only to learn that by losing they still get absorbed. While Finn manages to grab the crown, Jake gets fully absorbed into Slime Princess, forcing Lumpy Space Princess to save Finn. Finn and Lumpy Space Princess flee and, along with Gunter the penguin, they journey to a radically altered Fire Kingdom to locate Flame Princess and her crown. The group finds the monarch—who has turned into a mighty dragon—in the bowels of the kingdom. When Flame Princess swallows the jewel necessary to save Ooo, Finn gives into his violence and begins attacking her, which transforms him into a fire person. Lumpy Space Princess, angered by the violence, yells at everyone to stop their fighting. The kingdom misinterprets her anger and decide to start a war with the Candy Kingdom.

Lumpy Space Princess chases after Finn and attempts to turn him back to normal, but to no avail; the Fire Kingdom citizens then start to fight the inhabitants of the Candy Kingdom. In a last ditch effort to save the world, Lumpy Space Princess reaches out to Finn's "hero heart," which reminds him of happiness, returning him to normal. Finn collects the jewels necessary to revert the world and gives them to Betty, but she betrays him and leaves him behind. Betty reveals that she wants to use the jewels to go back in time and stop Simon from transforming into Ice King. Ice King, oblivious to her plans, accidentally ruins her spell, causing her to get transported to Mars. Meanwhile, Lumpy Space Princess rescues Finn from the candy inhabitants as Princess Bubblegum begins to convert the rest of Ooo into candy. Finn realizes that throughout this ordeal, Lumpy Space Princess has yet to be converted by elemental magic. He speculates that her immunity means that she is, in effect, the anti-elemental. After Ice King arrives with the gems, Lumpy Space Princess taps into her anti-elemental powers and transforms Ooo back to normal. However, Jake now has five eyes and looks like his blue shape-shifter parent. Finn tells him that they'll find a way no matter what to fix everything and Jake embraces him, seeming to not be aware of his true form.

== Production ==
In late 2015, Cartoon Network aired an Adventure Time miniseries entitled Stakes during the show's seventh season. This was followed in early 2017 by a second miniseries entitled Islands, which aired as a part of the show's eighth season. On March 30, 2017, Cartoon Network announced that these two miniseries would be succeeded by a third, entitled Elements. This miniseries, along with Islands, had also been hinted at in 2015 (when head story writer Kent Osborne revealed prior to the airing of Stakes that the show would likely produce several more miniseries) and in 2016 (when Cartoon Network announced that "new episodes, mini-series, specials and more" would precede the series finale).

A comparison of two shots from the original Adventure Time intro sequence (left) to similar shots from the Elements intro (right).

Much like Stakes and Islands, Elements has a unique title sequence that was designed just for the miniseries. The new intro was storyboarded by Hanna K. Nyström and, much like the intros for both Stakes and Islands, was animated by Masaaki Yuasa's company Science SARU. The sequence was unveiled via the official Adventure Time Tumblr on April 3; at this time, the site noted: "Once again, we were lucky enough to feature a new intro animated by Science SARU for the upcoming Elements miniseries;" Nyström later called it "a treat" to storyboard the intro. Unlike the usual sequence that normally begins episodes of Adventure Time, the Elements intro features imagery reflecting the four primary elements in the Adventure Time universe. The theme itself is sung by Hynden Walch, the voice actress for Princess Bubblegum.

Head writer Kent Osborne, series showrunner Adam Muto, Jack Pendarvis, and Julia Pott contributed to every episodes' story; this miniseries marked Pott's first time writing for the series, and according to Pendarvis, she "parachuted in[to the writer's room] at perhaps the most mind boggling moment in the sweeping arc of the series just totally undaunted, and showed incredible spirit and ingeniousness that encouraged us to press forward." Former creative director Patrick McHale also contributed to the story for the episode "Cloudy", as the plot for this episode was based on an unused first season episode (at that point known as "Cloud Story"), for which he had drawn a few rough storyboard panels. Storyboard artists who worked on this miniseries include Sam Alden, Polly Guo, Seo Kim, Somvilay Xayaphone, Steve Wolfhard, Graham Falk, Hanna K. Nyström, Aleks Sennwald, Kent Osborne, and Laura Knetzger. Cole Sanchez and Elizabeth Ito served as the miniseries' supervising directors, and Sandra Lee served as art director. (Note: Information regarding story development and storyboard artists is taken from all of the episodes' opening credits.)

== Cast ==
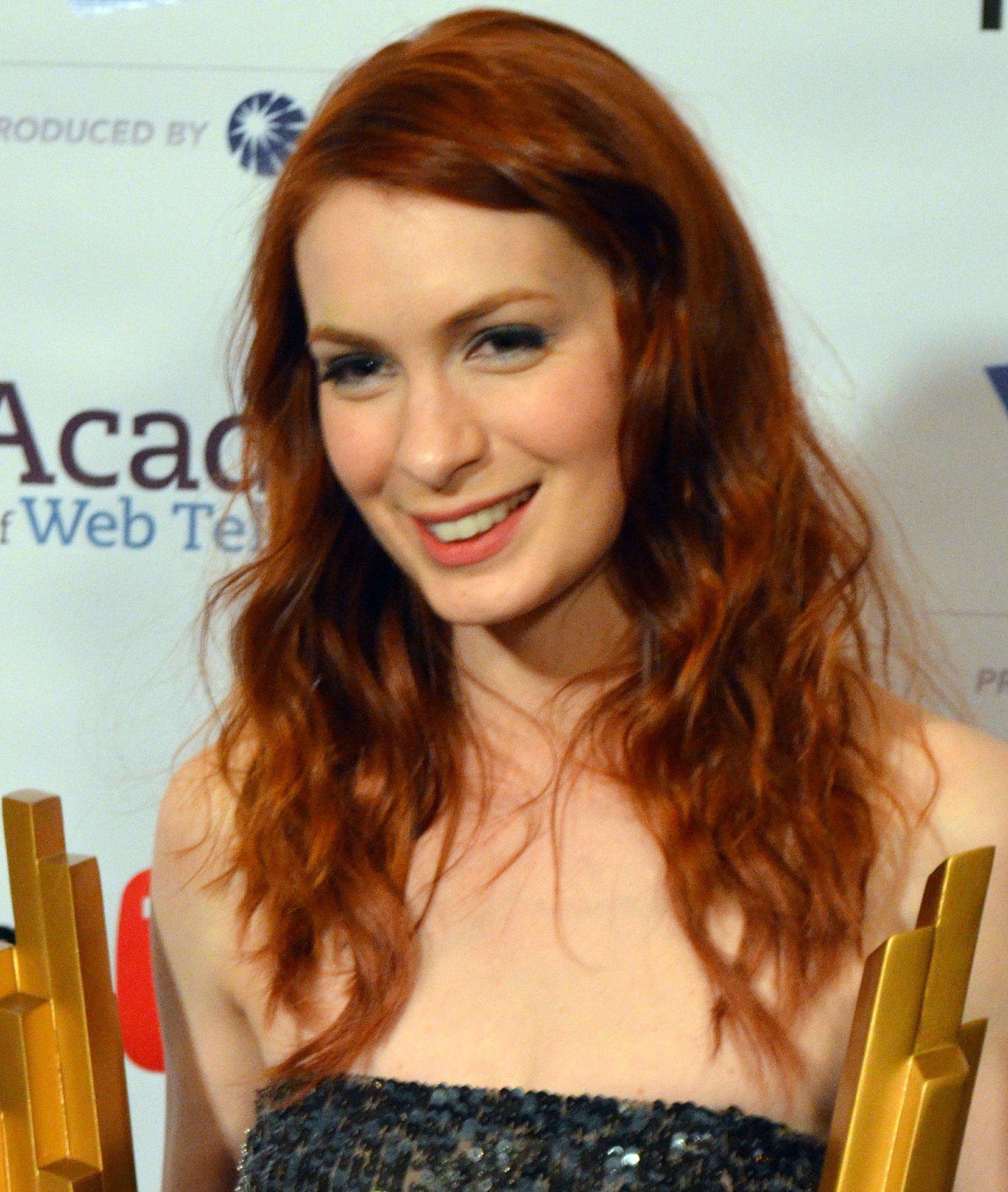
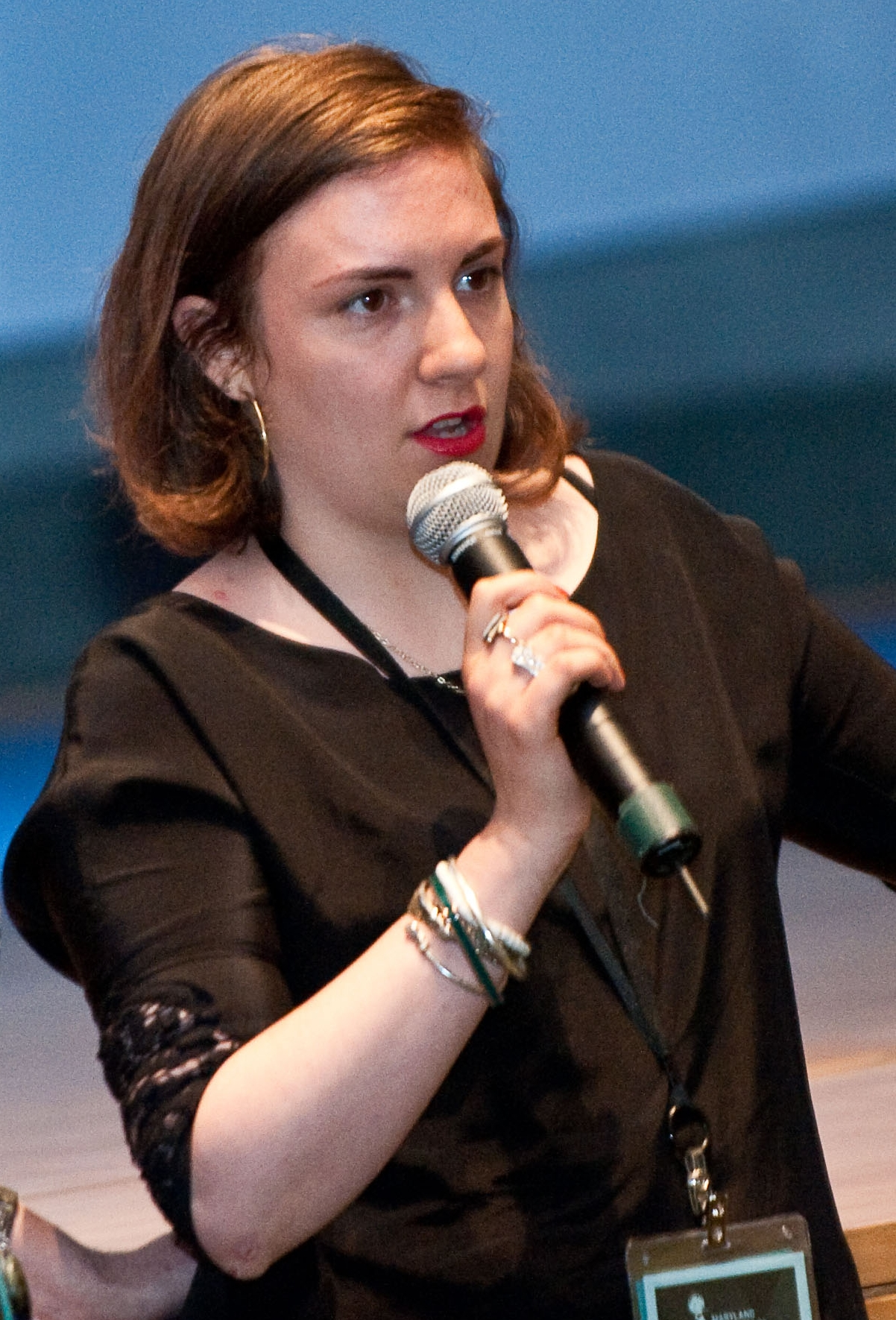
Felicia Day (left) guest stars in this miniseries, playing Betty Grof. The role had previously been played by Lena Dunham (right).

The miniseries features vocal performances from the show's regular crew: Jeremy Shada (who voices Finn the Human), John DiMaggio (who portrays Jake the Dog), Olivia Olson (who portrays Marceline), Tom Kenny (who lends his voice to Ice King), Hynden Walch (who voices Princess Bubblegum), Ward (who voices Lumpy Space Princess), and Niki Yang (who voices the sentient video game console BMO in English, as well as Jake's girlfriend Lady Rainicorn in Korean). Polly Lou Livingston, a friend of Pendleton Ward's mother, Bettie Ward, plays the voice of the small elephant Tree Trunks. Jessica DiCicco voices Flame Princess, Finn's ex-girlfriend and the sovereign of the Fire Kingdom. Andy Milonakis voices N.E.P.T.R., a sentient robot who makes and throws pies. Justin Roiland provides the voice of the Earl of Lemongrab. Felicia Day also has a starring role in this miniseries, playing Ice King's fiancée, Betty Grof (in previous episodes, this role had been played by Lena Dunham). The Adventure Time cast records their lines together as opposed to doing it individually. This is to capture more natural sounding dialogue among the characters. Hynden Walch has described these group session as akin to "doing a play reading—a really, really out there play."

The miniseries also features several guest actors lending their voices to various characters. Hayden Ezzy plays Fern, Ethan Maher voices Sweet P, Ron Lynch returns as Mr. Pig, Lauren Lapkus reprises her role as Patience St. Pim, Dana Snyder lends his voice to the Life-Giving Magus, Cameron Esposito appears as Carroll the cloud woman, storyboard artist Tom Herpich voices Mr. Fox, Jeff Bennett plays Choose Goose, John Hodgman reprises his role as Elder Plops, Andy Samberg returns to voice Party Pat, and Andrew Daly voices Wyatt. Additionally, American singer and songwriter Kelly Hogan lends her voice to the song "Blue Magic", which plays in the episode "Winter Light". Throughout the miniseries, background voices are provided by Grey Griffin, Maria Bamford, Steve Little, and Dee Bradley Baker.

== Release and reception ==
=== Broadcast ===
Elements aired as part of the show's ninth season on Cartoon Network from April 24 to April 27, 2017. The miniseries premiered on Cartoon Network Australia on June 19, 2017 and concluded on June 23, 2017. Elements premiered on Cartoon Network UK on December 4, 2017 and concluded on December 7, 2017.

=== Ratings ===
The premiere episodes, "Skyhooks"/"Bespoken For", were collectively watched by 0.826 million viewers and they both scored a 0.2 in the 18- to 49-year-old demographic according to Nielsen (Nielsen ratings are audience measurement systems that determine the audience size and composition of television programming in the United States); this means that 0.2 percent of all households with viewers aged 18 to 49 years old who were watching television at the time of the episodes' airing. In terms of viewership numbers, the miniseries hit a high with the second and third episodes, both of which were watched by 0.98 million individuals. The miniseries' final two episodes, "Hero Heart" and "Skyhooks II", were collectively viewed by 0.9 million viewers, and they both scored a 0.21 in the 18- to 49-year-old demographic.

=== Critical reception ===
Elements has received generally positive reviews. Oliver Sava of The A.V. Club awarded the miniseries a "B" letter grade. He contended that the episodes helped to return the viewers to the land of Ooo and also to resituate and reconfigure the characters' central relationships. Despite writing positively of the plot and the first half of the miniseries, Sava contended that "the back half of the miniseries switches into a generic plot where the heroes have to collect assorted items in order to stop the Elementals, and it starts to get more repetitive with each chapter." With all of this said, Sava wrote that the miniseries "does great work reinforcing how important Finn and Jake's friendship is for both of them"; he argued that this was best on display in "Cloudy", which he called "the simplest, quietest, and most affecting chapter of the entire miniseries."

Zack Smith of Newsarama awarded the miniseries an 8 out of 10 and wrote positively of the show's use of the event series format, noting that it allows for "a stronger sense of focus [...] with every episode giving the sense that the story is building to a larger conclusion". Smith also wrote that the miniseries was a "visual treat", and he applauded how it provided the show with an excuse to redesign almost all of its characters. With that said, he also wrote that the miniseries was somewhat of a "victory lap" because "there's not a lot of forward momentum in the overall mythology of the show".

Zack Blumenfeld of Paste magazine praised the miniseries, declaring that Elements "is superior to and more cohesive than both Stakes and Islands, simultaneously a return to Adventure Time's surrealist roots and an emotional step forward." Blumenfeld highlighted "Cloudy" as the miniseries' strongest episode, noting that it "give us flashes of the show's old innocence [and] it also opens up a window into Jake's inner life that we rarely see." Ultimately, he wrote that "the quality of the [series' previous] miniseries comes down to their emotional content, and Elements has that in spades. It's a welcome sign of continuous vitality from Cartoon Network's flagship show, and its urgency serves to remind us that we won't have Adventure Time forever".

== Episodes ==
No. overall	No. in season	Title	Supervising direction by	Written and storyboarded by	Original release date (Note: "Orb" was released through the Cartoon Network phone App on April 14, the Elements miniseries was released for download via iTunes on April 18, and "Abstract" through "Three Buckets" were released via the Cartoon Network phone app on July 14. However, because this field specifically refers to episode airdates, the information here will denote when these fourteen episodes first aired on Cartoon Network.)	Prod. code	US viewers (millions)
254	2	"Elements Part 1: Skyhooks"	Cole Sanchez	Sam Alden & Polly Guo	April 24, 2017	1042-260	0.83
Finn, Jake and BMO return to Ooo and discover that their home and its surroundings have been turned into candy. They also encounter Fern, N.E.P.T.R., Shelby, Lemongrab, Tree Trunks, Mr. Pig and Marceline, who are now happily-brainwashed candy people. A frightened Sweet P, the only person who is still normal, directs the three to a mysterious candy tower. The tower is Princess Bubblegum, who has become a large candy being and tries make them candy people as well. BMO is transformed; Finn and Jake are rescued by the Ice King, who takes them to the Sky Kingdom. As Finn and Jake look down, they discover that Ooo has been divided into four corrupted sections.
255	3	"Elements Part 2: Bespoken For"	Elizabeth Ito	Somvilay Xayaphone & Seo Kim	April 24, 2017	1042-261	0.83
The Ice King explains what happened to Ooo while Finn and Jake were away. After they left on their adventure, he was visited by Betty (voiced by Felicia Day); frustrated that the Ice King did not remember her, she asks him for a date and recreates a restaurant from his previous life as Simon. When the Ice King still cannot remember his old life, Betty drops him off back home. Tiny Manticore advises Betty to reach out to him as the Ice King instead of Simon, since she has changed as well. Betty returns to the Ice King and they begin playing together. Patience St. Pim (voiced by Lauren Lapkus) kidnaps Betty and begins using her magic to empower the mind-controlled Princess Bubblegum, Flame Princess and Slime Princess, while the Ice King flees with Gunter.
256	4	"Elements Part 3: Winter Light"	Cole Sanchez	Steve Wolfhard & Laura Knetzger	April 25, 2017	1042-262	0.98
Finn, Jake and the Ice King travel to the Ice World and break through the large ice dome covering its center. They see Carroll (voiced by Cameron Esposito) from "The Tower", who was converted to ice and is pleased with her new appearance. They then encounter Patience, who seems disappointed with the new Ooo. She empowered the other elementals, but they remain in their own sections of Ooo because Patience forced them to power up instead of allowing them to do it themselves. The gang rescues Betty and leaves, as Patience bemoans the new world to an iced Choose Goose. Betty says that she can help them with the power of the Enchiridion (which Finn has), and laughs ominously.
257	5	"Elements Part 4: Cloudy"	Elizabeth Ito	Graham Falk & Kent Osborne	April 25, 2017	1042-263	0.98
To calm Finn, Jake tucks them into a cloud which floats away from the Ice King and Betty. Jake and Finn float in an endless sky, and another cloud (with a door) flies past them. They play barber to pass the time, and get to the root of their worries. The cloud flies past again, and they discover that it is a type of animal known as an "Angler Lard". They use the Lard to fly back to Betty and the Ice King, and Betty has discovered how to return Ooo to normal.
258	6	"Elements Part 5: Slime Central"	Elizabeth Ito	Aleks Sennwald & Hanna K. Nyström	April 26, 2017	1042-264	0.92
Finn and Jake arrive in the transformed Slime Kingdom to retrieve Slime Princess' crown for her jewel. They see Lumpy Space Princess, who is attending Slime Princess's roller-skating party. The winners of the skating competition are absorbed by Slime Princess, and the losers are caged. Finn, Jake and Lumpy Space Princess enter and lose, discovering that they get absorbed anyway. Finn grabs the crown, but Jake is absorbed by Slime Princess. Lumpy Space Princess saves Finn, revealing that her "lumps" protect her from corruption. They are ejected from Slime Princess and forced to leave. Finn is sad at the loss of Jake, but Lumpy Space Princess explains that Finn and Jake always win; this inspires Finn to continue his mission.
259	7	"Elements Part 6: Happy Warrior"	Cole Sanchez	Sam Alden & Polly Guo	April 26, 2017	1042-265	0.92
Finn, Lumpy Space Princess, and Gunter arrive in a radically-altered Fire Kingdom. The inhabitants, which include Wyatt (voiced by Andrew Daly) and Lady Rainicorn, attack the heroes. Finn and Gunter try desperately to restrain their violent tendencies, which would allow the kingdom to corrupt them. The group finds Flame Princess, who has transformed into a dragon. When she swallows the jewel necessary to save Ooo, Finn begins attacking her and becomes a fire person. Lumpy Space Princess, angered by the violence, yells at everyone to stop fighting. The kingdom misinterprets her anger, and decides to go to war with the Candy Kingdom. Cinnamon Bun, unaffected by the corruption, frets that this is the end of Ooo.
260	8	"Elements Part 7: Hero Heart"	Elizabeth Ito	Somvilay Xayaphone & Seo Kim	April 27, 2017	1042-266	0.90
Lumpy Space Princess chases Finn and unsuccessfully tries to return him to normal. The Ice King and Betty try to intervene, but are swatted away by Flame Princess. The Fire Kingdom inhabitants "fight" their Candy Kingdom counterparts, upsetting Lumpy Space Princess. After eating some of Marceline (who is made of marshmallows), Lumpy Space Princess reaches out to Finn's heroic heart by placing some of Princess Bubblegum on him. Remembering happier times with Bubblegum, Finn returns to normal. Bubblegum then fires her candy powers, converting everyone except Finn (who is protected by Lumpy Space Princess) into obedient candy people. Finn grabs the three jewels and gives them to Betty; she betrays him and leaves him behind, surrounded by the inhabitants of the Candy Kingdom.
261	9	"Elements Part 8: Skyhooks II"	Cole Sanchez	Steve Wolfhard	April 27, 2017	1042-267	0.90
Betty knocks out the Ice King and says that she wants to use the jewels to go back in time and prevent Simon from transforming into the Ice King. The Ice King, oblivious to her plans, accidentally ruins her spell; this causes her to be transported to Mars, where she meets Normal Man. Lumpy Space Princess rescues Finn from the candy people; Princess Bubblegum enacts her plan to convert the rest of Ooo into candy, while Patience freezes herself again. Finn realizes that Lumpy Space Princess's immunity means that she is the anti-elemental. The Ice King arrives with the gems, and Lumpy Space Princess returns Ooo to normal. Jake returns (resembling his blue shape-shifter parent), but Finn is happy to be reunited with his brother.

== Home media ==
The entire miniseries was released through iTunes on April 17, 2017. This marked the third time that Adventure Time episodes had been officially released before officially airing on Cartoon Network (the first instance being the release of the episode "Princess Day" on the DVD of the same name on July 29, 2014, and the second being the release of the Islands miniseries on January 24, 2017).

=== DVD release ===
Elements was released on DVD exclusively in Australia.

"Elements"
Set details
Special features
- 8 episodes
- 1-disc set
- 1.78:1 aspect ratio
- Subtitles: English
- English (Dolby Stereo)
- TBA
Release dates
Region 1
Region 4
Region A
Region B
TBA
July 3, 2018
TBA
TBA

== See also ==
- "Orb", which functions as a prequel to Elements
- "Ketchup", which features an allegorical recollection of Elements

== Notes ==
Directing clarifications

Explanatory notes
