= Ghostshrimp =

American graphic artist, animator and illustrator (born 1980)

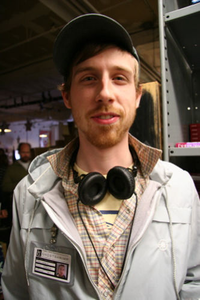
- Ghostshrimp in 2004
- Born: Daniel Rogers James; August 14, 1980 (age 46); Shutesbury, Massachusetts, U.S.
- Known for: Illustration, animation

Daniel James Bandit (born Daniel Rogers James; August 14, 1980), better known as Ghostshrimp, is an American graphic artist, animator and illustrator. His illustration work has appeared in The New York Times, The New Yorker, and on many album covers, including the MF Doom and Bishop Nehru collaboration NehruvianDoom. He is the former lead background designer for the Cartoon Network series Adventure Time. He left midway through production of the fourth season to return to his freelance career, although he later temporarily returned to design backgrounds for the seventh season miniseries Stakes and several subsequent ninth and tenth-season episodes. Finally, for the same channel he created in 2013 the pilot Mars Safari!, which was released online as part of Cartoon Network Studios' shorts development program.

== Biography ==
Ghostshrimp lived a self-proclaimed "Mark Twain childhood", and he spent most of his time in the forests around his home in rural western Massachusetts. When his family eventually moved to seacoast New Hampshire, the memories of the forests that he played in as a kid stayed with him and became hugely influential when he became an artist. Prior to moving to California, Ghostshrimp graduated from the Pratt Institute, where he had studied art. After that, lived in a cabin that he had constructed himself on Mystery Mountain in New Hampshire. This influenced his later ideas for the Land of Ooo, as in how he envisioned Finn and Jake's tree fort.

In 2008, Ghostshrimp freelanced for Cartoon Network, working with John Infantino to storyboard three episodes for the first season of Thurop Van Orman's series The Marvelous Misadventures of Flapjack. He eventually moved out to California to work full-time on the show's second season, but after completing only one episode was fired by Van Orman from the series due to disagreements with his storyboard partner, Mike Roth.

Around this time, Adventure Time was in development and its producers had been long fretting about the series' background art. Creator Pendleton Ward wanted his series to be "fully realized", with a greater emphasis on the series' environment and setting. The crew had tried a whole variety of art styles for the background art, but nothing seemed to gel with Ward's vision. Eventually, after considering Ghostshrimp's designs, the crew believed that they had found their designer; in fact, former creative director Patrick McHale noted that he "was pretty much perfect". Ward and McHale approached Ghostshrimp the day after he was let go from Flapjack and offered him a job on the show. Ghostshrimp was given free rein to design the world, and Ward told the artist to make the series look like it took "place in a 'Ghostshrimp World'".

Ghostshrimp had taken the job at Cartoon Network in order to save up enough money to buy a tract of land in Northern New England to build the Bandit family homestead and start a training camp for aspiring visual artists. His plan eventually worked, and he left Adventure Time during production of the show's fourth season and moved into the forest of the Northeast Kingdom of Vermont. The inaugural session of Ghostscout Training Camp lasted from August 1 to September 1, 2012, and Ghostshrimp continues to host the 30-day training camp every August.

In 2014, Ghostshrimp created his own pilot for Disney Television Animation entitled Pinchy and Ponchy. Ghostshrimp also helped on visual development for another Disney TVA pilot, Douglas Furs, created by Jesse LeDoux and Matt Olsen. Both pilots were picked up for a full series order by Disney XD, but executive changes at Disney Branded Television in 2016 ended their production.

Ghostshrimp has returned to Adventure Time several times. The first was in March 2015, when he agreed to design backgrounds for the seventh-season miniseries "Stakes". According to his official Facebook profile, he designed around 70 new pieces for the show. In later 2016 and early 2017, Ghostshrimp also revealed that he was working on new background pieces for several ninth- and tenth-season episodes, including several that comprise the show's finale.

== Art style ==
Ghostshrimp's art style is highly idiosyncratic. Fellow background artist Chris Tsirgiotis has described Ghostshrimp's art as "simple at first glance, but it's actually very sophisticated and nuanced". Tsirgiotis has also said that Ghostshrimp "is a master at his use of pattern. He puts it in just about everything he does."

== Filmography ==
Title	Channel	Year(s)	Role(s)
The Marvelous Misadventures of Flapjack	Cartoon Network	2009	Writer and storyboard artist (4 episodes)
Adventure Time	Cartoon Network	2010–2012, 2015, 2016, 2017	Background designer, and guest voice actor (as "Phil", "Wizard", and "Head #2")
Uncle Grandpa	Cartoon Network	2010	Character clean-up ("Pilot")
Transmission	Short only	2012	Special thanks
Cartoon Network Shorts Department	Cartoon Network	2013	Creator, writer, storyboard artist, character designer, and background designer for the short, “Mars Safari”
Douglas Furs	Disney XD	2014	Background designer; pilot only
Pinchy and Ponchy	Disney XD	2014	Creator, writer, storyboard artist, character designer, and background designer; pilot only
Cartoon Cartoons	Youtube	2026	Background designer for the short “Hungy Ghost”
