= Stakes (miniseries) =

2015 Adventure Time miniseries

- Adventure Time episodes
- DVD cover
- Episode nos.: Season 7 Episodes 6–13
- Directed by: Elizabeth Ito (Note: Supervising director); Andres Salaff; Adam Muto; Sandra Lee (Note: Art director)
- Written by: Ako Castuera (Note: Storyboard artist, "Marceline the Vampire Queen", "Take Her Back", "Checkmate"); Jesse Moynihan; Adam Muto (Note: Storyboard artist, "Everything Stays"); Hanna K. Nyström; Tom Herpich (Note: Storyboard artist, "Vamps About", "The Dark Cloud"); Steve Wolfhard; Seo Kim (Note: Storyboard artist, "The Empress Eyes"); Somvilay Xayaphone; Lyle Partridge (Note: Storyboard artist, "May I Come In?"); Luke Pearson
- Story by: Pendleton Ward; Kent Osborne; Adam Muto; Jack Pendarvis
- Original air date: November 16, 2015–November 19, 2015

Episode chronology
← Previous "Football"	Next → "The More You Moe, the Moe You Know"
- Adventure Time season 7

Adventure Time: Stakes, also known simply as "Stakes", is an American animated television miniseries comprising eight episodes from the television show Adventure Time, created by Pendleton Ward. It aired as part of the show's seventh season from November 16, 2015 to November 19, 2015 on Cartoon Network. Adventure Time follows the adventures of Finn (voiced by Jeremy Shada), a human boy, and his best friend and adoptive brother Jake (voiced by John DiMaggio), a dog with magical powers to change shape, grow and shrink at will. In this limited event series, Princess Bubblegum (voiced by Hynden Walch) removes the vampiric essence from Marceline the Vampire Queen (voiced by Olivia Olson), which unleashes five recently resurrected vampires into The Land of Ooo. Marceline, Bubblegum, Finn, Jake, and Peppermint Butler (voiced by Steve Little) are forced to deal with the fallout.

The miniseries' story was developed by series creator Pendleton Ward, showrunner Adam Muto, head writer Kent Osborne, and staff writer Jack Pendarvis. The eight episodes were storyboarded by Ako Castuera, Jesse Moynihan, Muto, Hanna K. Nyström, Herpich, Steve Wolfhard, Seo Kim, Somvilay Xayaphone, Lyle Partridge, and Luke Pearson. Andres Salaff, Elizabeth Ito, and Muto handled supervising direction, and Sandra Lee served as art director. Former Adventure Time storyboard artist Rebecca Sugar returned briefly to the show to voice Marceline's mother and to contribute a song entitled "Everything Stays".

Stakes was a ratings success, and was met with mostly positive reviews, with Sugar's song in particular being met with critical applause. Conversely, a few commentators felt that the miniseries did not meet expectations. For his work on the Stakes finale, Herpich won a Primetime Emmy Award for Outstanding Individual Achievement in Animation at the 68th Primetime Creative Arts Emmy Awards in 2016. Stakes was released on DVD on January 19, 2016.

== Plot ==
After losing her umbrella leaving her stuck in the shade of a tree in the desert, Marceline the Vampire Queen (voiced by Olivia Olson) approaches Princess Bubblegum (voiced by Hynden Walch) and asks her to cure her of her vampirism, as she no longer wants to be immortal. Bubblegum agrees and extracts the vampiric essence from Marceline's body. As Marceline recovers, the extracted essence gains sentience and escapes. Meanwhile, Finn (voiced by Jeremy Shada) and Jake (voiced by John DiMaggio) are called out to investigate livestock being attacked by a bloodsucking creature. Suspecting Marceline, they confront her, only to discover the extracted essence is behind the attacks. However, as Finn and Jake chase the vampiric essence, a mob of angry villagers capture Marceline and tie her to windmill, hoping that the rising sun will kill her. As the light hits her body, Marceline's life flashes before her eyes: Marceline first recalls a time when her mother (voiced by Rebecca Sugar) comforted her by singing a lullaby entitled "Everything Stays". Marceline then remembers Simon (voiced by Tom Kenny) leaving her before he is fully corrupted by the ice crown. She also remembers when she hunted vampires as a teenager and thereafter befriended a tribe of humans who survived the Mushroom War. Back in the present, the sunlight does not hurt Marceline, indicating that she has been cured.

Meanwhile, Jake encounters Marceline's freed vampiric essence, which has divided into five vampires whom Marceline had previously slain: the Fool (voiced by Ron Funches), the Empress (voiced by Rebecca Romijn), the Hierophant (voiced by Paul Williams), the Moon (voiced by Beau Billingslea), and the Vampire King himself (voiced by Billy Brown). The Vampire King's cohorts are each based on a different tarot card. As of a disagreeance of how to reestablish dominance, Hierophant goes to the forest, Empress goes to the Ice Kingdom to gather new troops, and Moon retreats to a marsh-like area. Witnessing this, Jake warns Finn and Marceline—the latter of whom recalls when she slew the Vampire King but was turned into a vampire in the process. Marceline tracks down and confronts the resurrected Vampire King, killing the Fool and reabsorbing his power of flight. However, before she can battle the Vampire King, he warns her that the Empress is headed for the Ice Kingdom. Fearing for the safety of the Ice King, Marceline gives chase, and with the help of Finn and Bubblegum, slays the Empress, reabsorbing her powers of invisibility. Finn, Jake, Marceline, and Bubblegum then encounter the shape-shifting Hierophant. When notified by Peppermint Butler (voiced by Steve Little) that the Hierophant cannot enter houses without permission, Jake shapeshifts into a house and the group takes shelter inside. The Hierophant manages to injure Marceline, but he is accidentally knocked into Jake and dies due to his entering a house uninvited. Marceline reabsorbs his shapeshifting powers but falls ill due to the Hierophant's wound. Princess Bubblegum takes Marceline to the Candy Kingdom to try to cure her. Meanwhile, Finn and Jake track down the Moon in hopes of using her powers to heal Marceline. Finn and Jake lure the Moon back to Marceline, who manages to reabsorb the vampire's healing power, thereby allowing her to recover from her injury.

Marceline and the group prepare for their final confrontation with the Vampire King. However, when he appears before them, he declares that he no longer wishes to be a vampire. The group reluctantly agrees to remove the King's vampiric essence. Bubblegum places the Vampire King in the same contraption that she used on Marceline, turning him into a relatively harmless lion. The vampiric essence, on the other hand, is placed in a bucket, which accidentally detonates and forms a new monstrosity: the Dark Cloud. This looming essence begins ambling towards the Candy Kingdom, causing Finn, Jake, and Bubblegum to go on the offensive. Marceline, however, loses the will to fight. The Ice King arrives and briefly talks to Marceline, instilling in her a sense of purpose; Marceline then realizes that it is her destiny to stop the Dark Cloud. Marceline flies into the Dark Cloud and, using her soul-sucking abilities, drains it from the inside out. However, she does so at the cost of once more becoming the Vampire Queen. Once the incident is over, Marceline comes to terms with her vampiric nature. The miniseries concludes with Marceline singing a rendition of "Everything Stays"; as she sings, the audience is presented with short sequences showing Ooo returning to normalcy.

== Production ==
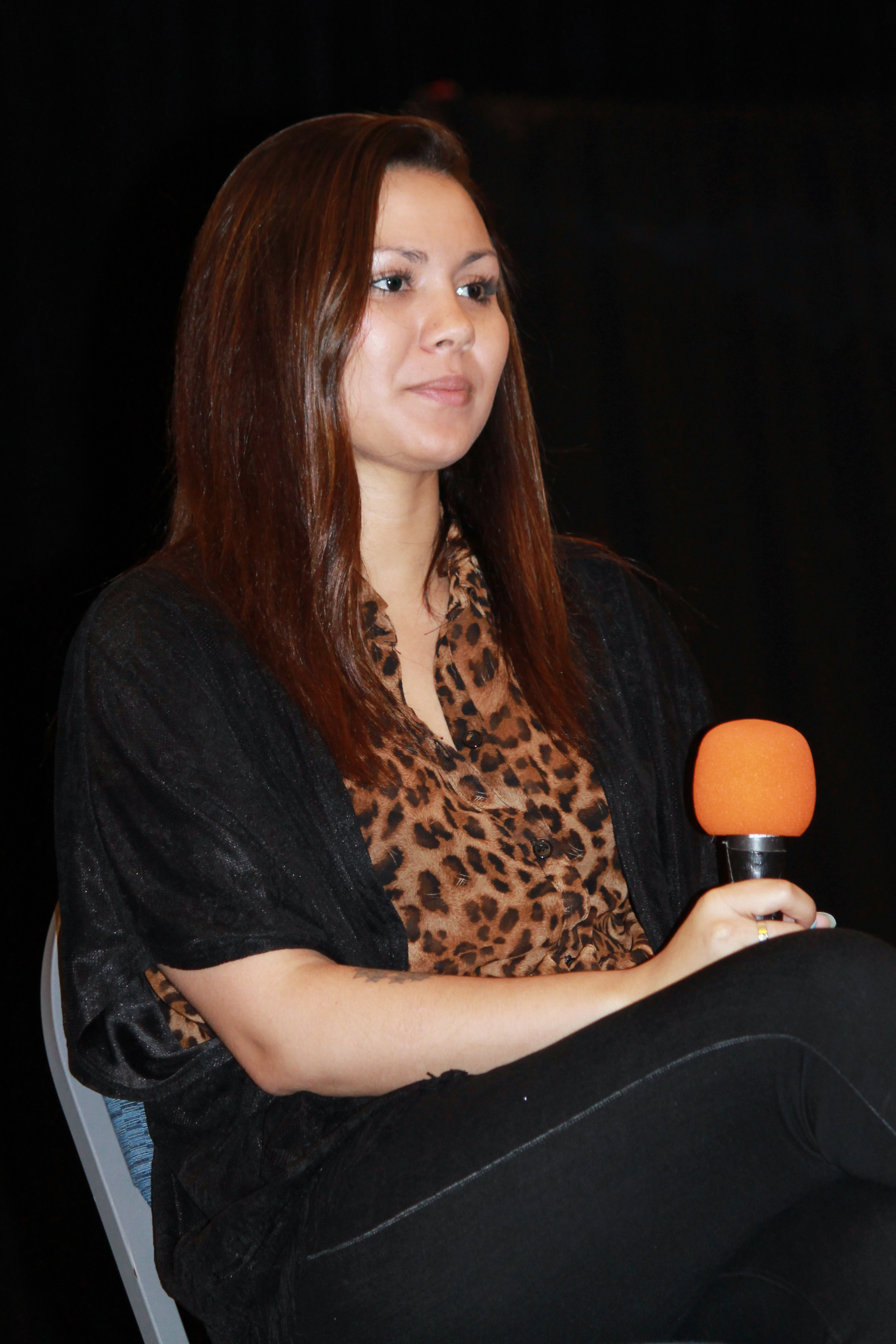
Marceline is voiced by Olivia Olson.

Stakes was announced in February 2015 alongside news of Long Live the Royals, a separate miniseries created by Sean Szeles, at an upfront regarding Cartoon Network's programming for the 2015 to 2016 television season. Writing for Cartoon Brew, Amid Amidi speculated that both were commissioned following the success of Over the Garden Wall, the network's first miniseries created by Patrick McHale (a former writer for Adventure Time). Michael Ouweleen, the chief marketing officer of the network, later said that "miniseries provide the network with more opportunities to try different creative textures and give new properties a chance to get on air." Despite being touted by some outlets as a "spin-off", Adventure Time showrunner Adam Muto later clarified that Stakes was considered part of the series' seventh season.

At the 2015 New York Comic Con, Muto revealed that the miniseries originated with ideas that were initially developed during the show's second season. He remarked, "There was this idea from season two about Marceline and ... how she got her powers to begin with. We kind of rolled with that and expanded that into eight episodes." In a 2020 interview, former series creative director and storyline writer Patrick McHale clarified what exactly this original idea had been:

I realized [sometime during the production of season two] that we'd never actually had Marceline and Ice King interact with each other in the same episode, and we'd also established that they were both 1000 years old. I thought that was meaningful, and so I started coming up with this whole elaborate backstory [explaining that] Marceline was the daughter of a demon and a human ... [and that roughly one thousand years prior to the start of the show] Marceline and Ice King were working together to save humanity [from vampires]. But Ice King was losing himself [to the ice crown], and it all landed on Marceline to fight off the vampires as the humans were escaping on an ark, set for some unknown shore. ... So in the final struggle, as a mutated horde of monsters and vampires come to kill the last remaining humans ... [Marceline] goes and fights the vampires with her demon powers so that the boat can leave. The humans make it, but Marceline is turned into a vampire. So she's stuck looking [like a teenager] forever, and Ice King is stuck being crazy ... and it's too heartbreaking for [Marceline] to ever even go near him, so she avoids him and lives in a cave ... Anyway, I pitched this whole huge elaborate thing to the writers room and they were like, "That's cool, Pat." But it was too much plot. Nobody was very excited about it.

Olson was not aware that the producers and writers were working on a Marceline-centric miniseries until the series' head writer, Kent Osborne, casually mentioned it to her in a conversation; when she learned of this, she reportedly cried because she was so excited. Due to the Marceline-centric nature of the miniseries, a new opening was created that features Olson singing the theme song over a bass guitar. This intro was storyboarded by Tom Herpich and was animated by Masaaki Yuasa's company Science SARU.

The miniseries' story was developed by head writer Kent Osborne, series creator Pendleton Ward, Jack Pendarvis, and Muto. The eight episodes were storyboarded by Ako Castuera, Jesse Moynihan, Muto, Hanna K. Nyström, Herpich, Steve Wolfhard, Seo Kim, Somvilay Xayaphone, Lyle Partridge, and Luke Pearson. Andres Salaff, Elizabeth Ito, and Muto served as the miniseries' supervising directors, and Sandra Lee served as art director. (Note: Information regarding story development and storyboard artists is taken from all of the episodes' opening credits.) Notably, the miniseries saw the return of several artists who had previously left the series, like Castuera (a storyboard artist who had left the series after working on the fifth season finale "Billy's Bucket List"), and Rebecca Sugar (a storyboard artist and songwriter, who had left the series after working on the fifth-season episode "Simon & Marcy"). Castuera storyboarded the first, sixth, and seventh parts of Stakes alongside Moynihan, and Sugar wrote a new song for the miniseries entitled "Everything Stays" and voiced Marceline's mother.

A comparison of two shots from the original Adventure Time intro sequence (left) to similar shots from the Stakes intro (right).

In regards to the miniseries' cynosural song "Everything Stays", Nyström revealed that, during the storyboarding of the episode of the same name, she found herself unable to write a lullaby for the scene between Marceline and her mother. She relayed her issue to Muto, who contacted Sugar and asked if she would be willing to pen the song. Sugar agreed and based the song on an incident in which she lost a stuffed animal in a garden. A year later, she found it; the sun had bleached the exposed surfaces, but the underside was still the same. She explained, "[The stuffed animal] wasn't better, or worse, just different. It was the first time I realized that things will change no matter what, even if they're left alone, and stay completely still." Muto was excited to have Sugar return to work on the show, and noted at the 2015 Adventure Time San Diego Comic-Con panel that "because [Stakes] was a Marceline miniseries, it wouldn't really feel complete unless Rebecca Sugar wrote a song for it." At San Diego Comic-Con, Sugar and Olson performed the song live.

Ghostshrimp, a background artist who worked on the series during seasons one through four, also returned to draw around 70 background pieces for this miniseries. Ghostshrimp, who had left the series during the middle of season four, noted: "I was super pumped that they wanted me to work on it, [and] it was great to return to that world for another go around."

== Cast ==
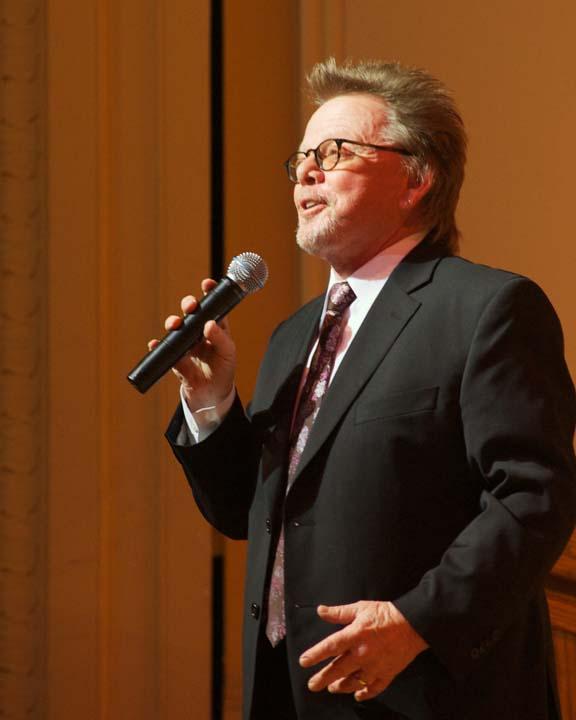
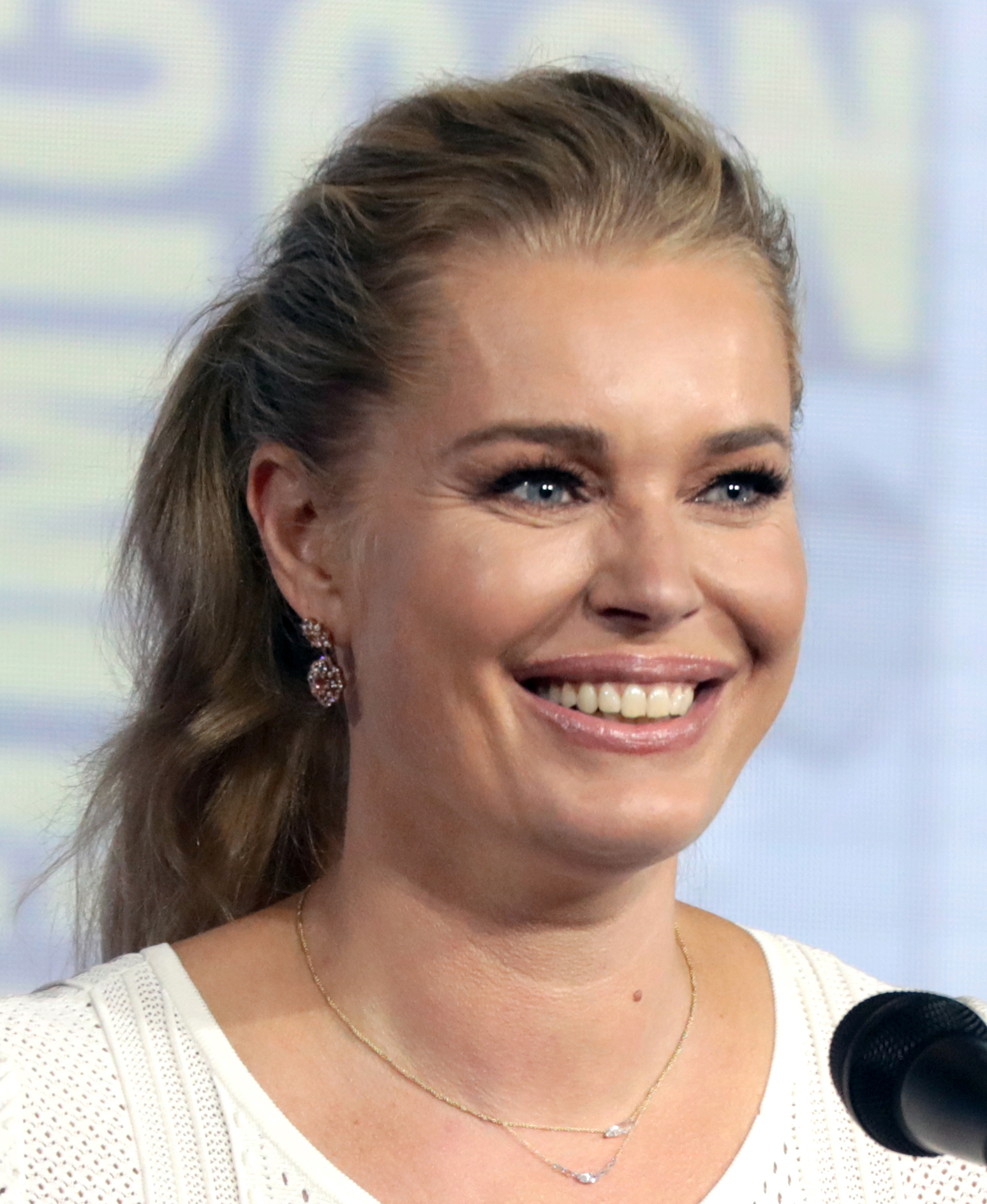
The miniseries guest starred Paul Williams (left) and Rebecca Romijn (right), among others.

The miniseries features vocal performances courtesy of the show's regular crew: Jeremy Shada (who voices Finn the Human), John DiMaggio (who portrays Jake the Dog), Olivia Olson (who portrays Marceline), Tom Kenny (who lends his voice to the Ice King), Hynden Walch (who voices Princess Bubblegum), Steve Little (who plays Peppermint Butler), and Pendleton Ward (who voices Lumpy Space Princess). The Adventure Time cast records their lines together as opposed to doing it individually. This is to capture more natural sounding dialogue among the characters. Hynden Walch has described these group session as akin to "doing a play reading—a really, really out there play."

The miniseries also features several guest actors lending their voices to various characters. Sugar, in addition to her role as songwriter, was also brought on board to voice Marceline's mother; this role marks her first foray into voice acting. Other guest stars include Rebecca Romijn as the Empress, Billy Brown as the Vampire King, Paul Williams as the Hierophant, Ron Funches as the Fool, Beau Billingslea as the Moon, Kyle Kinane as Cloud Dance, and Ava Acres as Young Marceline and the rabbit-hatted child.

== Release and reception ==
=== Broadcast ===
Although several sources suggested that the miniseries would air in October 2015, the miniseries instead debuted on Cartoon Network on November 16, 2015. An exclusive sneak peek was screened at the New York Comic Con on October 9. The first two episodes of Stakes debuted on November 16, and, following this, two episodes aired every day for three days. On November 20, the entirety of the miniseries re-aired. On January 18, 2016, preceding the miniseries' January 19, 2016 DVD release in the United States, Cartoon Network aired Stakes as an 88-minute standalone movie.

The miniseries made its international debut on Cartoon Network in Australia and New Zealand on January 18, and concluded airing on January 21, 2016. Stakes premiered on Cartoon Network UK and Ireland on March 14, 2016, and concluded on March 17, 2016.

=== Ratings ===
According to a Cartoon Network press release distributed prior to Stakes being available on DVD, the miniseries was a "success" for the network, "ranking as the #1 program in its time period with all key kids and boys audiences." The premiere episodes, "Marceline the Vampire Queen"/"Everything Stays", were collectively watched by 1.87 million viewers and they both scored a 0.45 in the 18- to 49-year-old demographic according to Nielsen (Nielsen ratings are audience measurement systems that determine the audience size and composition of television programming in the United States); this means that 0.45 percent of all households with viewers aged 18 to 49 years old were watching television at the time of the episodes' airing. This made the two episodes the most-watched installments of the series, in terms of viewers, since the sixth season episode "The Diary", which was viewed by 1.91 million viewers. The miniseries' final two episodes, "Checkmate"/"The Dark Cloud", were collectively viewed by 1.7 million viewers, and they both scored a 0.4 in the 18- to 49-year-old demographic.

=== Critical reception ===
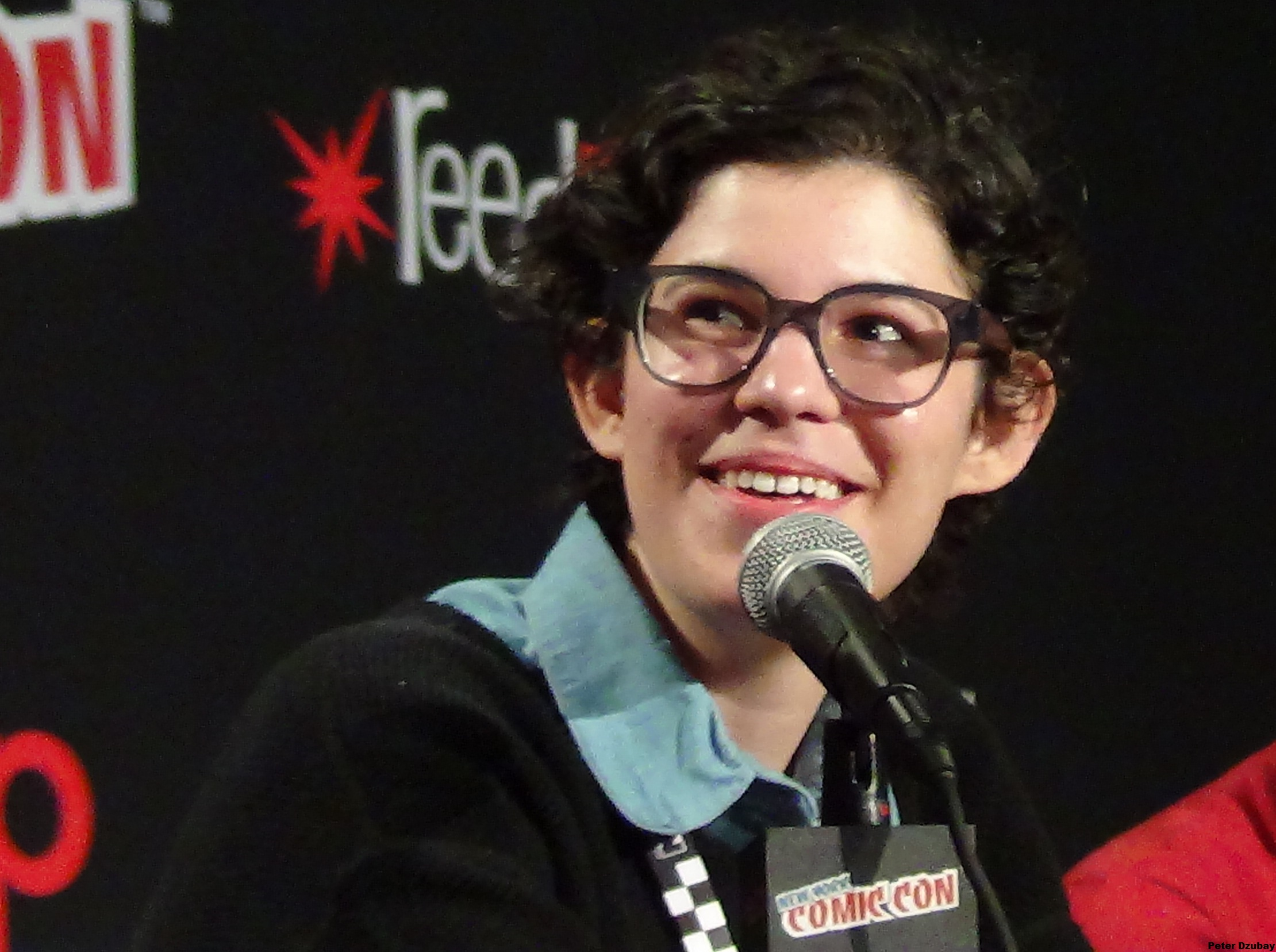
Former series storyboard artist Rebecca Sugar temporarily returned to the show as a songwriter and voice actress. Her song "Everything Stays" was met with critical praise.

Stakes was met with mostly positive reviews, although a few commentators felt that the miniseries did not meet expectations. Charlie Jane Anders of io9 applauded the miniseries, noting that it is an interesting meditation on the concept of change, as well as the on philosophical idea that everything is cyclical. In regards to the art and direction of the miniseries, Anders wrote: "There is so much insane gorgeous imagery in this [miniseries], including a ton of really fantastic dream sequences. This show is really pushing its limits in terms of pure visual artistry." Anders noted that, while some fans of the show have been suffering from "Adventure Time fatigue"—largely based on the belief that the show has not moved forward since Finn met his father—Stakes "really feels like a rejoinder to the people who complain the show isn't moving fast enough with its plots". Writing for Vox, Emily St. James wrote highly of the miniseries, arguing that it was an excellent example of the coming-of-age story that "shows off the kids series' emotional maturity". She did note that the miniseries is "less a cohesive whole than a bunch of short stories that feel as if they accidentally add up to something bigger", and that the need for every installment to exist as a self-contained unit made Stakes "a little clunky". With that being said, she felt that it ended up being "suitably epic" and "rich with metaphor". Ultimately, St. James felt that the moral message of the miniseries was: "Change is good. Growth is good. Supporting others' growth is good. And accepting others when they need to change is the best thing you can do."

Heather Hogan of Autostraddle lauded the miniseries for "color[ing] in some of Marceline's past, answer[ing] lots of questions about her relationship with Bonnie, and promis[ing] her a richer future." She argued that the miniseries as a whole was a commentary on depression, and that at the conclusion of Stakes, while Marceline had not vanquished depression, "fighting it helped her grow." Brandon Russell of TechnoBuffalo wrote, "The miniseries does an excellent job of exploring themes of depression, change, and forgiveness." Russell praised the miniseries for showing Marceline's emotional transformation, noting that Marceline's momentary depression in "The Dark Cloud" at the futility of her plight is "a reminder that, although change is hard, it's necessary for growth." However, Russell critiqued the fact that, due to the individual episodes' lengths, some of the miniseries' more poignant material was not explored to its full extent.

Oliver Sava of The A.V. Club awarded the miniseries a "B", noting that the event "loses steam when it moves away from the introspective personal elements of the past to detail Marceline and her friends' vampire hunting adventure in the present." He also bemoaned the fact that only "Everything Stays" features flashbacks, arguing that "rushing through those past events is a missed opportunity to offer a more comprehensive look at where Marceline comes from and how those circumstances have shaped her". With that being said, Sava was highly complimentary towards the voice acting, with praise being directed towards Olson and the actors who voice the villains; Sava wrote, "The new characters' personalities are quickly solidified by the guest stars' expressive performances." Eric Thurm of Pitchfork Media opined that Stakes "includes all sorts of cool action sequences and, best of all, it focuses on the backstory of the show's most musical character: Marceline [...] But Stakes, as fun as it is, ultimately fails to fully deliver, mostly because of a lack of, um, stakes."

Sugar's "Everything Stays" was met with critical praise. St. James described it as "beautiful". Russell argued that it is "arguably the most beautiful and poignant song in the Adventure Time canon." Sava called it "poignant", noting that "Olson brings a mournful quality to the song when Marceline reprises it later, and the combination of her somber vocals with Sugar's delicate songwriting gives the song a quiet power that highlights the importance of this melody in Marceline's story." Likewise, Thurm called it the "most exciting moment" in the miniseries and that the song "is pretty much a perfect Adventure Time song. It's quiet, beautiful, and heartfelt—a lullaby for children at heart, no matter their age."

=== Accolades ===
For his work on "The Dark Cloud", Tom Herpich won a Primetime Emmy Award for Outstanding Individual Achievement in Animation at the 68th Primetime Creative Arts Emmy Awards in 2016, making it the series's fourth win in this category. (Note: Former lead character designer Andy Ristaino had won the award in 2013, former art director Nick Jennings had won it in 2014, and storyboard artist Tom Herpich had previously won it in 2015.)

== Episodes ==
No. overall	No. in season	Title	Supervising direction by	Written and storyboarded by	Original release date	Prod. code	US viewers (millions)
205	6	"Stakes Part 1: Marceline the Vampire Queen"	Andres Salaff	Jesse Moynihan & Ako Castuera	November 16, 2015	1034-212	1.87
Marceline asks Princess Bubblegum to cure her vampirism, as she no longer wants to be immortal. Bubblegum performs an experimental procedure to extract the vampiric essence from Marceline's body; as Marceline recovers, the extracted essence gains a will of its own and escapes. Meanwhile, Finn and Jake are called to investigate bloodsucking attacks on livestock; they discover Marceline's extracted essence is responsible, as it has transformed into a vampire. While Finn and Jake chase the vampire, a mob of angry villagers capture Marceline and leave her to be destroyed by the rising sun.
206	7	"Stakes Part 2: Everything Stays"	Elizabeth Ito	Hanna K. Nyström & Adam Muto	November 16, 2015	1034-213	1.87
While sunlight engulfs her, Marceline experiences flashbacks. She is comforted by her mother's lullaby as a child; witnesses Simon leaving her to protect her from himself; hunts vampires as a teenager and discovers she can absorb their powers. She befriends a tribe of Hyoomans, who are preparing to escape an impending catastrophe they fear will happen. Marceline helps fight more vampires, and tells the Hyoomans to flee when the Vampire King arrives. In the present, Marceline survives the sunlight, successfully cured of vampirism. Meanwhile, Jake encounters the vampires Marceline had previously killed, resurrected by her freed vampiric essence.
207	8	"Stakes Part 3: Vamps About"	Andres Salaff	Tom Herpich & Steve Wolfhard	November 17, 2015	1034-214	1.82
The five deadliest vampires resurface: the Vampire King, The Fool, The Empress, the Hierophant and the Moon. Surprised to be alive again, they disagree on what to do and go their separate ways. Witnessing this, Jake warns Finn and Marceline. Learning the Vampire King is alive, Marceline has a flashback of their previous battle—when the Vampire King sacrificed himself to bite Marceline, making her the last vampire. Marceline hunts and confronts the resurrected Vampire King, killing the Fool and reabsorbing his power of flight. However, the Vampire King warns her that the Empress is headed for the Ice Kingdom. Fearing for the Ice King's safety, Marceline leaves immediately.
208	9	"Stakes Part 4: The Empress Eyes"	Elizabeth Ito	Somvilay Xayaphone & Seo Kim	November 17, 2015	1034-215	1.82
The Empress arrives at the Ice Kingdom and uses her hypnotism power on the Ice King, who captures Finn for her. Marceline attacks and escapes with Finn, pursued by the Ice King. Marceline tries to jog the Ice King's memory, but it turns out he was never hypnotized and this is how he always acts around women. Marceline then attacks the Empress, who has the upper hand until she is paralyzed by a special gun Bubblegum developed. Marceline kills the Empress and reabsorbs her power of invisibility. She apologizes to her friends for trying to fight the vampires alone and tells them that they will hunt the remaining vampires together.
209	10	"Stakes Part 5: May I Come In?"	Adam Muto	Luke Pearson & Lyle Partridge	November 18, 2015	1034-216	1.85
While on the trail of the vampire known as the Moon, the group run into trouble when the shape-shifting Hierophant finds them. He proves to be too powerful to fight, so on learning that he cannot enter houses without permission, Jake shapeshifts into a house and the group take shelter inside. The Hierophant proposes joining forces against the Vampire King, and Marceline agrees on the condition that the Hierophant stops drinking blood. However, he attacks her and during the struggle, he is accidentally knocked into Jake and dies due to entering a house uninvited. Marceline reabsorbs his shapeshifting powers but then falls ill, having been poisoned by the Hierophant's stinger.
210	11	"Stakes Part 6: Take Her Back"	Andres Salaff	Jesse Moynihan & Ako Castuera	November 18, 2015	1034-217	1.85
Princess Bubblegum brings Marceline to the Candy Kingdom to work on a cure for the Hierophant's poison. Meanwhile, Finn and Jake find the Moon whose healing power might aid Marceline, but cannot kill the Moon because her healing powers are so great. The Moon awakens at sunset and Finn and Jake flee, luring the Moon to the Candy Kingdom. The Moon uses her powers to incapacitate Finn and Jake as she attempts to kill Marceline, but Peppermint Butler stabs the Moon in the back, her only weak spot. Marceline reabsorbs the Moon's healing power and fully recovers from the poison.
211	12	"Stakes Part 7: Checkmate"	Elizabeth Ito	Jesse Moynihan & Ako Castuera	November 19, 2015	1034-222	1.70
The group prepare to confront the Vampire King, who unexpectedly appears and says he no longer wishes to be a vampire. He maintains this, despite Marceline's attempts to attack him, and the group reluctantly agree to remove his vampiric essence. Bubblegum uses the same contraption she'd earlier used on Marceline, which turns the Vampire King into a relatively harmless lion, and puts his vampiric essence in a bucket. Bubblegum leaves Peppermint Butler to properly dispose of the essence but he trips, causing the essence to detonate into a new monstrosity: The Dark Cloud.
212	13	"Stakes Part 8: The Dark Cloud"	Andres Salaff	Tom Herpich & Steve Wolfhard	November 19, 2015	1034-219	1.70
The Dark Cloud moves towards the Candy Kingdom, pursued by Finn, Jake, and Bubblegum. Seeing Bubblegum fighting the Dark Cloud, the people of Candy Kingdom are inspired to overthrow the King of Ooo and join the battle. Marceline resigns herself to defeat until the Ice King instills in her a sense of purpose, convincing her it is her destiny to stop the Dark Cloud. Marceline eventually uses her demonic soul-sucking abilities to drain the Dark Cloud from the inside out. However, in doing so she once more becomes the Vampire Queen. In the aftermath, Marceline comes to terms with her vampiric nature, telling Bubblegum that her time as a mortal has made her more mature. Marceline sings a rendition of "Everything Stays", with short sequences of Ooo's return to normalcy.

== Home media ==
Warner Home Video released the entire miniseries on DVD on January 19, 2016. The episodes were later re-released as part of the complete seventh season DVD on July 18, 2017. The individual episodes can also be downloaded from both the iTunes Store and Amazon.com.

=== DVD release ===
Stakes
Set details
Special features
- 8 episodes
- 1-disc set
- 1.78:1 aspect ratio
- Subtitles: English
- English (Dolby Stereo)
- Animatics
- Song demos
- Art gallery
Release dates
Region 1
Region 4
Region A
Region B
January 19, 2016
April 6, 2016
N/A
N/A

== See also ==
- Islands, the second Adventure Time miniseries, which aired as part of the show's eighth season in early 2017
- Elements, the third Adventure Time miniseries, which aired as part of the show's ninth season in April 2017

== Notes ==
Directing clarifications

Explanatory notes
