= Islands (miniseries) =

2017 television miniseries

- Adventure Time episodes
- DVD cover
- Episode nos.: Season 8 Episodes 20–27
- Directed by: Elizabeth Ito (Note: Supervising director); Cole Sanchez; Sandra Lee (Note: Art director)
- Written by: Sam Alden; Polly Guo; Seo Kim; Somvilay Xayaphone; Tom Herpich; Steve Wolfhard; Graham Falk; Pendleton Ward; Hanna K. Nyström; Aleks Sennwald; Kent Osborne; Adam Muto
- Story by: Kent Osborne; Adam Muto; Jack Pendarvis; Ashly Burch; Pendleton Ward (Note: Pendleton Ward only contributed to the story for "Imaginary Resources".)
- Original air date: January 30, 2017–February 2, 2017

Episode chronology
← Previous "Jelly Beans Have Power"	Next → "Orb"
- Adventure Time season 8

Adventure Time: Islands, also known simply as "Islands", is an American animated miniseries comprising eight episodes from the television show Adventure Time, created by Pendleton Ward. It aired as part of the show's eighth season on Cartoon Network from January 30, 2017, to February 2, 2017. Adventure Time follows the adventures of Finn (voiced by Jeremy Shada), a human boy, and his best friend and adoptive brother Jake (voiced by John DiMaggio), a dog with magical powers to change shape, grow and shrink at will. In this limited event series, Finn, Jake, BMO (voiced by Niki Yang), and Susan Strong (voiced by Jackie Buscarino) leave Ooo and voyage across the ocean to learn about Finn's origin. During their trip, they encounter various creatures, new friends, and several interesting islands. The trip culminates with a visit to Founder's Island, where Finn meets his biological mother, Minerva Campbell (voiced by Sharon Horgan), and discovers what happened to the remainder of the human race.

Islands is the second Adventure Time miniseries to have been produced, following Stakes, which aired in November 2015. Islands was preceded by the release of a graphic novel, which tied into the story and served as a prequel. The miniseries' story was developed by head writer Kent Osborne, series showrunner Adam Muto, story editor Jack Pendarvis, and staff writer Ashly Burch. Storyboard artists who worked on this miniseries include Sam Alden, Polly Guo, Seo Kim, Somvilay Xayaphone, Tom Herpich, Steve Wolfhard, Graham Falk, Pendleton Ward, Hanna K. Nyström, Aleks Sennwald, Kent Osborne, and Adam Muto. Cole Sanchez and Elizabeth Ito served as the miniseries' supervising directors, and Sandra Lee served as art director.

Islands was met with critical acclaim, with many critics applauding how the miniseries further developed the show's characters. Additionally, the episode "Imaginary Resources" won a Primetime Emmy Award for Outstanding Individual Achievement in Animation at the 69th Primetime Creative Arts Emmy Awards in 2017. Islands was released on DVD on January 24, 2017.

== Plot ==
A large robotic craft arrives searching for Susan Strong (voiced by Jackie Buscarino), but the craft is dispatched by Jake (voiced by John DiMaggio). Princess Bubblegum (voiced by Hynden Walch) examines the wreckage and discovers that it is of human origin, which engenders in Finn the Human (voiced by Jeremy Shada) a desire to travel across the sea from whence the craft came and meet others of his kind; Susan, Jake, and BMO accompany Finn on his voyage. Initially, the journey is easy and uneventful, but after a series of mishaps, the group's boat is destroyed by a mysterious colossus, throwing everyone overboard. Finn subsequently wakes up on an island where the weather drastically fluctuates. After meandering around for a while, he eventually encounters an old lady named Alva (voiced by Helena Mattsson) who speaks Swedish. Alva invites Finn to her home and shows her home movies of other humans who have since presumably died. Later, Finn and Alva encounter Jake, who informs the group that he does not know the whereabouts of either BMO and Susan. Finn and Jake eventually head to a futuristic island where all of society has hooked themselves up to a virtual reality simulator. BMO is revealed to have become the heroic leader of the VR people. Jake decides to go and destroy the generator powering the VR after BMO refuses to leave. Feeling bad for BMO, as well as the emaciated humans who emerge from the virtual reality simulator, Finn asks Jake to fix the generator, but BMO fixes it himself. BMO recognizes that if he remains behind, he will lose his friends, and so he, Finn, and Jake take a pod to the next island. It is on this stop that Finn, Jake and BMO find Susan, who begins to recall her long-forgotten past.

An extended flashback reveals Finn's origin, and what happened to the other humans. Roughly a thousand years prior to the main events of the series, a group of humans fled Ooo on a container ship (as seen in Stakes). They eventually settled on a secluded island chain far from the mainland. Over the next thousand years, the community grew into a veritable utopia. With that said, there were those few who occasionally grew dissatisfied with their rigidly structured lives and attempted to flee the island; these "hiders" were in turn hunted down and returned by specially trained "seekers". It is revealed that Susan's real name is Kara, and that she was once a seeker in training. Kara was friends with a fellow human, Frieda (voiced by Jasika Nicole), who began expressing a desire to flee the island. This revelation causes Kara some discomfort, so she approaches Dr. Gross (voiced by Lennon Parham), the cybernetic human in charge of training seekers, asking if the humans can live off the island. Dr. Gross convinces her that the outside is dangerous and, to prevent her from fleeing, she controls Kara with a remote control. Now fully under Dr. Gross's control, Kara stops Frieda from leaving and drags her away crying. Back in the present, Susan tells Finn her real name and decides to take Finn to Founders Island so that he can be reunited with his mother, Minerva Campbell (voiced by Sharon Horgan).

The audience is then presented with a series of flashbacks detailing how Minerva, a doctor, met Finn's father Martin Mertens (voiced by Stephen Root) when he was hospitalized after it was mistakenly believed he was attempting to leave the island with a group of escapees. Martin and Minerva eventually fell in love and had Finn. However, when the group of attempted escapees sought revenge on Martin for a previous betrayal, he fled on a boat with Finn. His escape is thwarted by the colossus—revealed to be a security device that was created to protect Founders Island from outside threats—which attacks the craft. In the chaos, the pair are separated, leaving Finn to drift away. The group is arrested and Minerva is heartbroken over Martin and Finn's disappearance.

Back in the present, the group make it to Founders Island where humans have been living in relative peace. While Kara seeks to make amends with Frieda, Finn and Jake discover that Minerva had digitized her consciousness in the past and now exists only in virtual reality. Minerva reveals that she had Dr. Gross send Kara to retrieve Finn, but years had passed and Dr. Gross had accidentally released a deadly virus that was killing humans. Minerva had her essence uploaded into a computer, and then created the helpers to assist the human race. Now that she is with Finn, she expresses her desire that he stay permanently. Finn tries to convince Minerva that life off the island is not all bad, but Minerva thinks off-island life is dangerous. Finn then tries to convince the humans to leave, and they all rally alongside him. This causes Minerva to attempt to upload the consciousnesses of all the islands' inhabitants. To prevent this, Finn shares with her his memories of helping people, causing her to back down; she realizes that Ooo is not nearly a threat as she before believed. The humans all change their minds about leaving, except for Frieda, who announces to Finn, Jake, and BMO that she and Susan have made amends and are leaving to have their own adventures. While setting sail on a new boat bound for Ooo, Finn has one final talk with Minerva through the VR headset, where the two embrace in the digital realm.

== Production ==
In February 2015 at an upfront regarding Cartoon Network's programming for the 2015 to 2016 television season, the network announced that Adventure Time would air a special miniseries entitled Stakes during the show's seventh season. Comprising 8 episodes and airing in November 2015, this miniseries was a "phenomenal success, ranking as the #1 program in its time period with all key kids and boys audiences." Prior to the airing of Stakes, head story writer Kent Osborne revealed that the show would likely produce several more miniseries, and when it was announced that the series would end in 2018, the network's official press release stated that prior to the show's conclusion there would be "new episodes, mini-series, specials and more".

According to TheSlanted, Cartoon Network took to "teas[ing]" information about the Islands miniseries immediately prior to its release. For instance, in early November 2016, ComiXology announced that the graphic novel Islands would tie "into the huge Adventure Time: Islands television event, the mini-series airing on Cartoon Network this winter where Finn meets other humans and an important member of his family for the first time", and later that month, an Amazon.com page for a pre-order of the Islands DVD was made available. Similarly, on December 9, the official Adventure Time Tumblr account revealed that the miniseries would have a unique title sequence. The announcements concerning the intro sequence, however, did not specifically explain what Islands was or when it would air. Official announcements detailing the miniseries were finally released on December 12, 2016, via a press release distributed to various media outlets.

A comparison of two shots from the original Adventure Time intro sequence (left) to similar shots from the Islands intro (right).

Much like Stakes, Islands has a unique title sequence that was designed just for the miniseries. The new intro was storyboarded by Sam Alden and, much like the Stakes intro, was animated by Masaaki Yuasa's company Science SARU. The sequence was previewed via Cartoon Network's Facebook page and the official Adventure Time Tumblr on December 12; at this time, the latter noted: "We were incredibly fortunate to have the fantastic staff of Science SARU animate [the] intro for [the] Islands miniseries. [Science SARU is] so good it's breathtaking." Unlike the usual sequence which begins episodes of Adventure Time, the Islands intro adopts a nautical theme, and highlights the characters Finn, Jake, Susan Strong, and BMO; the theme itself is sung by Jeremy Shada, the voice actor for Finn.

The miniseries' story was developed by head writer Kent Osborne, series showrunner Adam Muto, Jack Pendarvis, and Ashly Burch. Storyboard artists who worked on this miniseries include Sam Alden, Polly Guo, Seo Kim, Somvilay Xayaphone, Tom Herpich, Steve Wolfhard, Graham Falk, Pendleton Ward, Hanna K. Nyström, Aleks Sennwald, Kent Osborne, and Adam Muto. Cole Sanchez and Elizabeth Ito served as the miniseries' supervising directors, and Sandra Lee served as art director. (Note: Information regarding story development and storyboard artists is taken from all of the episodes' opening credits.)

== Cast ==
The miniseries features vocal performances courtesy of the show's regular crew: Jeremy Shada (who voices Finn the Human), John DiMaggio (who voices Jake the Dog), Hynden Walch (who voices Princess Bubblegum), and Olivia Olson (who voices Marceline the Vampire Queen). Niki Yang (who voices the sentient video game console BMO) and Jackie Buscarino (who voices Susan Strong) also play an integral part in the miniseries. The Adventure Time cast records their lines together as opposed to doing it individually. This is to capture more natural sounding dialogue among the characters. Hynden Walch has described these group session as akin to "doing a play reading—a really, really out there play."

The miniseries also features several guest actors lending their voices to various characters. Josh Fadem voices Whipple the sea-dragon, Helena Mattsson plays Alva, Reggie Watts voices Vinny, Jasika Nicole voices Freida, Livvy Stubenrauch plays young Kara/Susan, Sharon Horgan voices Finn's mother Minerva, and Laraine Newman lends her voice to the Widow. Likewise, Lennon Parham and Stephen Root reprise their roles as Dr. Gross and Finn's father Martin, respectively. Root had previously appeared in a string of sixth-season episodes, beginning with "Escape from the Citadel", and Parham had last voiced her character in "Preboot".

== Release and reception ==
=== Broadcast ===
Islands aired as part of the show's eighth season on Cartoon Network from January 30, 2017, to February 2, 2017. The miniseries made its international debut on Cartoon Network Australia on March 13, 2017. In South Korea, Islands was edited into a feature film and then released theatrically on April 13, 2017. Islands premiered on Cartoon Network UK on July 17, 2017, and concluded on July 20, 2017.

=== Ratings ===
The premiere episodes, "The Invitation"/"Whipple the Happy Dragon", were collectively watched by 1.20 million viewers and they both scored a 0.3 in the 18- to 49-year-old demographic according to Nielsen (Nielsen ratings are audience measurement systems that determine the audience size and composition of television programming in the United States); this means that 0.3 percent of all households with viewers aged 18 to 49 years old were watching television at the time of the episodes' airing. This made the two episodes the most-watched installments of the series, in terms of viewers, since the seventh-season episode "Five Short Tables", which was viewed by 1.36 million viewers. The miniseries' final two episodes, "Helpers" and "The Light Cloud", were collectively viewed by 1 million viewers, and scored a 0.27 in the 18- to 49-year-old demographic.

=== Critical reception ===
Pre-release reviews of the miniseries were largely positive. Zack Smith of Newsarama gave the miniseries a largely positive review and called it "fan service writ large, one that will prove immensely satisfying for long-term fans of the series". He applauded the way the string of episodes managed to start out with self-contained stories and move into a dense and emotional backstory. Tonally, Smith described the miniseries as possessing "the feel of an old-school post-apocalyptic SF saga—a journey through a devastated-but-wondrous world, with a sense of danger and mystery detached from the Land of Ooo." Smith's only complaint was that "there's enough rich emotional material once the voyagers reach their destination that it feels like more time could be spent there". Matthew Jacobson of The Spectrum wrote that "the story is masterful and imaginative" and that "if Islands is a litmus test, then the final season should be one heck of an adventure."

Post-release reviews were also positive. Oliver Sava of The A.V. Club awarded the miniseries an "A" and wrote that it "can be seen as a summary of Adventure Time's growth over seven seasons, beginning with smaller, sillier tales that build to something much deeper." He applauded how Islands "does fantastic work fleshing out supporting characters", specifically highlighting the show's nuanced and multidimensional portrayal of Martin, Dr. Gross, and Susan Strong. He wrote that the miniseries' main story is "a powerful thesis statement cementing the show's overall message that adventure is at the core of personal discovery and fulfillment", and that this same story is "extremely relevant to the United States' current socio-political climate". Dave Trumbore of Collider wrote that the string of episodes were "packed full of emotional resonance and deeply complex character relationships" and "dip[ped] into some emotionally difficult territory". Trumbore was particularly complimentary towards the way the show managed to explicate Susan's character by giving her a compelling backstory. Ultimately, Trumbore wrote that while "Adventure Time: Islands succeeds in every aspect the series has become known for," it also "comes up short in familiar ways ... Unfortunately, the style (and the duration) of Adventure Time episodes works against ... delving into [the show's] mythology ... so we'll just have to obsess over whatever glimpses we get and settle for watching this series again and again."

In a highly complimentary review for The New Republic, Juliet Kleber wrote that "Islands does a dizzying amount of plot development in 80-something minutes." Furthermore, she argued that "Finn's coming-of-age story and the exploration of the post-apocalyptic plotline" as featured in the miniseries "are handled just as deftly as any other subject—with fun and a tinge of sorrow." Zach Blumenfeld of Paste Magazine gave Islands a slightly more mixed, albeit still positive, review. He complimented the philosophical musing of the miniseries, which he argued "takes on shades of Black Mirror and existentialism to cast a critical eye on technology and the human spirit." Blumenfeld wrote:

Islands [...] [gives] us a world in which incredibly advanced bioengineering and cybernetics have kept humans alive and ensconced in relative comfort. But the twist is that the very scientific drive to innovate and develop these technologies is precisely what damned our species in the first place. [...] What Islands ends up delivering, therefore, is the most harrowing answer to Fermi's famous paradox: Intelligent life will inevitably destroy itself.

With this being said, he felt that episodes such as "Whipple the Happy Dragon" and "Mysterious Island" took time away from the main story, compacting Finn's emotional reaction to Founder's Island, which resulted in "relative emotional emptiness".

=== Accolades ===
Common Sense Media awarded the Islands miniseries with "The Common Sense Seal", calling it a "beautiful animated miniseries [that] explores a deep backstory." The episode "Imaginary Resources" won a Primetime Emmy Award for Outstanding Individual Achievement in Animation at the 69th Primetime Creative Arts Emmy Awards in 2017.

== Episodes ==
No. overall	No. in season	Title	Supervising direction by	Written and storyboarded by	Original release date (Note: The Islands miniseries was released on DVD and made available for download on iTunes and Amazon.com on January 24. However, because this field specifically refers to episode airdates, the information here will denote when these eight episodes first aired on Cartoon Network.)	Prod. code	US viewers (millions)
245	20	"Islands Part 1: The Invitation"	Elizabeth Ito	Sam Alden & Polly Guo	January 30, 2017	1042-251	1.20
A large robotic craft arrives searching for Susan Strong. However, when it reaches the Candy Kingdom, Jake destroys it with his fist. Princess Bubblegum examines the wreckage and discovers its location of origin leading Finn wanting to discover its creators. Before leaving, Finn tells Fern to stay and look after Ooo for him. Princess Bubblegum, Marceline and Fern see Finn, Jake and Susan off on their voyage.
246	21	"Islands Part 2: Whipple the Happy Dragon"	Elizabeth Ito	Somvilay Xayaphone & Seo Kim	January 30, 2017	1042-252	1.20
Finn, Jake, and Susan encounter a sea dragon named Whipple (voiced by Josh Fadem) who turns out to be rather annoying. BMO, who stowed away on their boat, angrily tells Whipple off. BMO summons a storm and destroys their boat forcing Jake to fill in. Jake begins to hallucinate his parents after a species of jellyfish latch onto him, but Finn and Susan are able to fight them. After Jake complains about wanting to return home, Finn reveals how important this trip is to him. Whipple overhears Finn's lament and uses his powers to blow the group over the dangerous waters.
247	22	"Islands Part 3: Mysterious Island"	Cole Sanchez	Tom Herpich & Steve Wolfhard	January 31, 2017	1042-253	1.09
After an encounter with a colossus, Finn wakes up on an island where the weather drastically fluctuates. He encounters an old lady named Alva (voiced by Helena Mattsson) who does not speak English. Alva invites Finn to her home and shows her home movies of other humans who have presumably died. Later Finn, Alva and her pet bear encounter Jake who does not know the whereabouts of BMO and Susan. On the moon, BMO is being attended to by another robot and wishes that Finn, Jake and Susan could join her.
248	23	"Islands Part 4: Imaginary Resources"	Elizabeth Ito	Pendleton Ward & Graham Falk	January 31, 2017	1042-254	1.09
Finn and Jake head to a futuristic island where all of society has hooked themselves up to a virtual reality simulator. BMO is revealed to actually be in that simulation becoming a heroic leader along with his sidekick Vinny (voiced by Reggie Watts). Jake decides to go and destroy the generator powering the VR after BMO refuses to leave. Feeling bad for BMO, as well as the emaciated humans, Finn asks Jake to fix the generator, but BMO fixes it himself. BMO returns to Finn and Jake and they take a pod to the next island.
249	24	"Islands Part 5: Hide and Seek"	Elizabeth Ito	Aleks Sennwald & Hanna K. Nyström	February 1, 2017	1042-255	1.01
Finn, Jake and BMO find Susan who begins to have glimpses of her past. Susan, whose real name is Kara, is a seeker in training whose job is to bring those who try to flee from paradise. Kara is friends with Frieda (voiced by Jasika Nicole) who expresses the desire to flee which causes Kara some discomfort. She approaches Dr. Gross (voiced by Lennon Parham) asking if they can live off the island. When Dr. Gross convinces her that the outside is dangerous, they stop Frieda from leaving, dragging her away crying. Back in the present, Susan tells Finn her real name.
250	25	"Islands Part 6: Min & Marty"	Cole Sanchez	Kent Osborne & Sam Alden	February 1, 2017	1042-256	1.01
Kara decides to take Finn to Founders Island so that he can be reunited with his mother, Minerva Campbell (voiced by Sharon Horgan). Flashbacks detail how Minerva, a nurse, met Finn's father Martin Mertins (voiced by Stephen Root) when he was hospitalized after it was mistakenly believed he was attempting to leave the island with a group of escapees. Martin and Minerva fall in love and have Finn. When one of the attempted escapees, an elderly widow (voiced by Laraine Newman), seeks revenge on Martin, he flees on a boat with Finn. When the colossus attacks their craft, the pair are separated, leaving Finn to drift away. The widow is arrested and Minerva is heartbroken over Martin and Finn's disappearance.
251	26	"Islands Part 7: Helpers"	Elizabeth Ito	Tom Herpich & Steve Wolfhard	February 2, 2017	1042-257	1.00
The group make it to Founders Island where humans have been living in relative peace. While Kara is distracted by Frieda, Finn and Jake discover that the island is full of Minerva look-alike robots called "helpers". They are brought to the real Minerva—a digitized consciousness—when Finn is identified as her son. Minerva reveals that she had Dr. Gross send Kara to retrieve Finn, but years had passed and Dr. Gross accidentally released a deadly virus that was killing humans. Minerva had her essence uploaded into a computer, and then created the helpers to prolong the human race. But now that Finn is here with her, she expresses her desire that he stay permanently.
252	27	"Islands Part 8: The Light Cloud"	Cole Sanchez	Graham Falk, Aleks Sennwald, & Adam Muto	February 2, 2017	1042-258	1.00
While Susan makes amends with Frieda, Finn tries to convince Minerva that life off the island isn't bad, but Minerva thinks it's dangerous. Finn then tries to convince the humans to leave and they all rally alongside him. Minerva tries to upload the consciousnesses of all the islands' inhabitants, so Finn shares with her his memories of helping people, causing her to back down. The humans all change their minds about leaving, except for Frieda. With Minerva's help, they defeat the colossus and Susan and Frieda leave for parts unknown. Finn has one final talk with Minerva through the VR headset before returning to Ooo with Jake and BMO.

== Home media ==
Warner Home Video released the entire miniseries digitally and on DVD on January 24, 2017. This marked the second time that Adventure Time episodes had been released on home media before officially airing on Cartoon Network (the first instance being the release of the episode "Princess Day" on the DVD of the same name on July 29, 2014).

=== DVD release ===
"Islands"
Set details
Special features
- 8 episodes
- 1-disc set
- 1.78:1 aspect ratio
- Subtitles: English
- English (Dolby Stereo)
- Animatics
- Song demos
- Art gallery
Release dates
Region 1
Region 4
Region A
Region B
January 24, 2017
May 4, 2017
TBA
TBA

== Comic book ==
In October 2016, it was announced that the stand-alone graphic novel, Islands, written by series' storyline writer Ashly Burch and illustrated by Diigii Daguna, would function as a prequel to the miniseries. In addition to focusing on Marceline's exploits, the book also explores the fate of the Hyoomans (introduced in the Stakes episode '"Everything Stays") after they are separated from Marceline. The book was released on December 6, 2016,

== See also ==
- "Orb", which continues from where Islands ends
- "Ketchup", which features a distorted recollection of Islands
- Elements, the third Adventure Time miniseries, which aired as part of the show's ninth season in April 2017

== Notes ==
Directing clarifications

Explanatory notes
