= The Diary (Adventure Time) =

- Adventure Time episode
- T.V. imagines a rollercoaster while he reads the diary; Jillian Tamaki received praise for her writing and visual artistry on the episode.
- Episode no.: Season 6 Episode 30
- Directed by: Cole Sanchez (Note: Supervising director); Nick Jennings (Note: Art director)
- Written by: Jillian Tamaki
- Story by: Kent Osborne; Pendleton Ward; Jack Pendarvis; Adam Muto
- Original air date: February 26, 2015
- Running time: 11 minutes

Guest appearances
- Dan Mintz as T. V.; Clark Duke as Justin Rockcandy

Episode chronology
← Previous "Dark Purple"	Next → "Walnuts & Rain"
- Adventure Time season 6

"The Diary" is the thirtieth episode of the sixth season of the American animated television series Adventure Time. In the episode, Jake's son T.V. finds an old diary, which revives a decades-old mystery. It was written by Canadian illustrator Jillian Tamaki, her second episode on the show after "Astral Plane". The episode was broadcast on Cartoon Network on February 26, 2015. Writers of Wired and The A.V. Club praised Tamaki for the way she wrote the episode as well as the visuals overall.

== Plot ==
Jake's son T.V. finds an old diary, which revives a decades-old mystery surrounding the writer of the book. T.V. soon pores over the scrawling of the writer, whose initials are B.P. The more and more T.V. reads, however, the more obsessed he becomes, to the point where he soon begins to experience everything that the diary's author wrote about. Eventually, with the help of Jake, T.V. is able to discover that the diary belonged to Nurse Poundcake when she was younger.

== Production ==
"The Diary" is the thirtieth episode of the sixth season of Adventure Time. Canadian illustrator Jillian Tamaki wrote the episode, for which she was also a storyboard artist. Her graphic novel This One Summer won the Caldecott Medal—the first of its format to receive this award—earlier in the month of the episode's broadcast. Prior to this episode, Tamaki wrote "Astral Plane", also in the sixth season. In "The Diary", Dan Mintz and Alia Shawkat voice act the respective characters of T.V. and Nurse Betsy Poundcake.

Regarding how she first got on the show, Tamaki said that the Adventure Time crew knew of her comics and invited her to write for an episode with them. According to Tamaki, who has several friends who work at Cartoon Network, the close association between the network and the comics community stems from the network tapping those artists for their "writing and drawing" skills, both of which are required for both animation and comics. She found, however, that the way the Adventure Time crew develops stories for the show was distinct compared to conventional development in such shows, where storyboard artists convey what writers give to them, with no difference in the product of each. Regarding her method of writing, Eric Thurm of Wired wrote that the missing pages of the diary in the episode allowed for Tamaki to "effectively build an Adventure Time quest out of an afterschool drama".

You can compress it, you can expand upon it, but I was constantly being told, "You have to articulate this motion. You just can't appear over there". You need to get there and stuff like that.

— Tamaki regarding her storyboarding on Adventure Time

In her comics career, the amount of drawings necessary for the field helped her as a storyboard artist on the episode, Tamaki explained. However, she said that timing in animation was less flexible, where "there are all these storyboarding rules you actually shouldn't do in comics, because a comic isn't a storyboard".

== Broadcast and reception ==
"The Diary" originally aired on February 26, 2015, on Cartoon Network. It was watched by 1.9 million viewers, receiving a Nielsen rating of 0.4 for adults in the 18- to 49-year-old demographic. According to TV by the Numbers, it was the 41st most-watched cable television episode of its air date for this demographic. The episode first saw physical release as part of the 2016 compilation DVD, Card Wars.

In his review of the episode, Thurm said that the episode was a take on soap operas and the conventions that make them fun to watch as well as an "integral and longstanding" to the television medium. He praised Mintz's voice acting as bringing "immediate credibility to the story", while the inclusion of Jake contributed to the season's theme of parenting. Oliver Sava of The A.V. Club graded the episode with an A, likewise complimenting Mintz's role while describing Shawkat's portrayal of Betsy as "a moving portrait of a shy, bookish young girl that falls desperately in love and loses herself in the process". He lauded the visuals and especially the environments, as well as the "deep emotional substance" of its "poignant story".

The writing staff for this episode was nominated for an Outstanding Achievement, Writing in an Animated TV/Broadcast Production at the 2016 Annie Awards ceremony.
