= Bad Jubies =

- Adventure Time episode
- "Bad Jubies" was filmed via stop-motion techniques.
- Episode no.: Season 7 Episode 20
- Directed by: Kirsten Lepore
- Written by: Kirsten Lepore
- Story by: Kirsten Lepore
- Production code: 1034-205
- Original air date: January 14, 2016
- Running time: 11 minutes

Guest appearances
- Kevin Michael Richardson as the storm & the automated weather alert system

Episode chronology
← Previous "Blank-Eyed Girl"	Next → "King's Ransom"
- Adventure Time season 7

"Bad Jubies" is the twentieth episode of the seventh season of the American animated television series Adventure Time. The episode was written, storyboarded, and directed by Kirsten Lepore, and filmed entirely via stop motion. It originally aired on Cartoon Network on January 14, 2016. The episode guest stars Kevin Michael Richardson as both a sentient storm and an automated weather alert system.

The series follows the adventures of Finn (voiced by Jeremy Shada), a human boy, and his best friend and adoptive brother Jake (voiced by John DiMaggio), a dog with magical powers that allow him to change shape and grow and shrink at will. In this episode, a deadly storm hits the grasslands, forcing Finn, Jake, BMO (voiced by Niki Yang), and Lumpy Space Princess (voiced by Pendleton Ward) to build a bunker. In the end, Jake begins beat boxing using nature sounds he has collected, which calms the storm.

"Bad Jubies" is the fourth guest-animated episode of Adventure Time, after season five's "A Glitch Is a Glitch", and season six's "Food Chain" and "Water Park Prank". Lepore was approached about directing the episode after Adventure Time showrunner Adam Muto saw her CalArts MFA thesis film, entitled "Move Mountain". The episode took roughly one year to make and was animated by Bix Pix Entertainment. "Bad Jubies" was met with positive critical reception, and upon its debut was viewed by 1.22 million people. Jason Kolowski, the episode's production designer, later won a Primetime Emmy Award for Outstanding Individual Achievement in Animation at the 68th Primetime Creative Arts Emmy Awards in 2016. In early 2017, the episode itself won an Annie Award for Best Animated TV/Broadcast Production for Children's Audience.

== Plot ==
After an automated weather alert system (voiced by Kevin Michael Richardson) announces the approach of a dangerous storm, Finn, Jake, Lumpy Space Princess, and BMO build an ad hoc storm shelter. Finn, Lumpy Space Princess, and BMO all chip in to help construct the refuge, but Jake spends most of the time wistfully contemplating nature. When the storm hits and the quartet is cut-off from the outside world, the isolation begins to drive everyone mad. It is then that Jake reveals what he had been doing out in nature earlier: collecting sounds. He begins beat boxing, using the sounds he collected as samples. Soon, the sentient storm (voiced by Richardson) breaks into the shelter, but Jake's nature beat box manages to tame the tempest.

== Production ==
"Bad Jubies" is the fourth guest-animated episode of the series, after season five's "A Glitch Is a Glitch", and season six's "Food Chain" and "Water Park Prank". At the 2014 San Diego Comic-Con, head writer Kent Osborne first revealed that the show was wanting to utilize stop motion in its next guest-directed episode. On October 24, 2014, Kirsten Lepore, an alumna of both the Maryland Institute College of Art's and CalArts's experimental animation programs, announced via her Twitter that she would be working on a "new project"; in tandem with this cryptic message, she posted a picture of an Adventure Time storyboard title sheet that listed her as the supervising director and storyboard artist for an episode.

Lepore first became involved with the show after her CalArts MFA thesis, the short film entitled "Move Mountain", was viewed by Adventure Time showrunner and executive producer Adam Muto in early 2014. He emailed Lepore, asking if she would be interested in working on the show. Muto was drawn to Lepore's work because her style—especially that which was exhibited in "Move Mountain"—was reminiscent of the spirit of Adventure Time; in an email correspondence with Lepore, Muto reportedly told her that the producers had "been wanting to do a stop motion episode for a very long time, [but they] were waiting for the right time and the right fit". In an interview The A.V. Club, she noted: "I knew this was a huge opportunity and such a huge honor […] It was really, really exciting for me to be able to get the project." With this being said, prior to the email, Lepore had never seen an episode of Adventure Time, and she soon started to watch the show to get a feel for its aesthetic. Eventually, however, she came to genuinely enjoy the show, and she now claims it is one of her favorites.

The episode took roughly one year to make. Approximately five or six months were devoted exclusively to writing, storyboarding, and pitching the episode's plot to the show's writers and the network. Lepore was initially worried because she had limited experience with writing lines for characters, as her previous films had almost exclusively lacked dialogue. Lepore claimed to have relegated herself to her bedroom for five weeks while she wrote and storyboarded the entirety of "Bad Jubies". On August 15, 2014, Lepore submitted her storyboard for network approval, and, after gaining said approval, teamed up with Bix Pix Entertainment. This production company constructed all of the backdrops, props, and puppets, while Lepore directed the endeavor. The production of the episode presented many technical challenges which Lepore had limited experience dealing with. Because she had mostly taught herself how to animate, she soon had to learn specific industry methods that, for instance, prevented puppets from falling over, or shots from being interrupted by human error. Lepore directed four separate animators, who each worked on a different set; this allowed for four times as much footage to be captured in a single day. The episode's introduction, which Lepore animated almost entirely by herself, was the last piece of stop motion made for the show. According to Lepore, the fleeting characters that appear were made "quick and dirty" out of clay, since they only appeared briefly.

The music for the episode was composed by electronic and chiptune artist Disasterpeace. In a Tumblr post, he wrote:

I had the pleasure of scoring Kirsten Lepore's guest directed, Emmy award-winning episode of Adventure Time from Season 7, "Bad Jubies". This is one of my favorite shows and I wanted to honor the feeling of open-ended creativity I feel is often on display when watching it, so I set out to create a collage aesthetic. I asked a bunch of friends to contribute samples to the score, and I was showered with all kinds of wonderful sounds. Guitars, organs, vocalizations, old answering machines, and that's just scratching the surface really.

In terms of sampling, Lepore herself provided a collage of nature sounds.

== Reception ==
"Bad Jubies" aired on January 14, 2016. It was seen by 1.22 million viewers and scored a 0.3 Nielsen rating in the 18- to 49-year-old demographic (Nielsen ratings are audience measurement systems that determine the audience size and composition of television programming in the United States), which means that the episode was seen by 0.3 percent of all individuals aged 18 to 49 years old who were watching television at the time of the episode's airing.

Oliver Sava of The A.V. Club awarded the episode an "A−", arguing that the episode was both about "how the act of creation can alienate the artist from others, but ultimately unites people with the finished product", and a meditation on negativity, depression, and the beauty of the natural world. Sava was impressed with Lepore's handle on the characters and their voices, especially given that her previous short films had made little to no use of dialogue. He was also appreciative that while Lepore did bring a unique and striking change by using a new medium, tonally, the episode is consistent with other episodes of Adventure Time. Robert Lloyd of the Los Angeles Times wrote that the episode "catches the show's combination of cosmic consciousness and domestic farce and takes it some places you never knew you wanted it to go. It's everything a special should be." He wrote highly of Lepore's medium, contrasting it with 3-D animation by saying, "In stop-motion, the space is real; the materials are real; their texture is not modeled texture but just, you know, texture. The light is light."

For his work on this episode, Jason Kolowski (the episode's production designer) won a Primetime Emmy Award for Outstanding Individual Achievement in Animation at the 68th Primetime Creative Arts Emmy Awards in 2016, making it the series's fifth win in this category. (Note: Former lead character designer Andy Ristaino had won the award in 2013, former art director Nick Jennings had won it in 2014, and storyboard artist Tom Herpich won it both in 2015 and 2016.) In late 2016, the episode and several of those who worked on it were also nominated for three Annie Awards. The episode itself was nominated for Best Animated TV/Broadcast Production for Children's Audience; Kirsten Lepore was nominated for Outstanding Achievement, Directing in an Animated TV/Broadcast Production; and Jason Kolowski was nominated for Outstanding Achievement, Production Design in an Animated TV/Broadcast Production. The episode won the Annie Award for Best Animated TV/Broadcast Production for Children's Audience.
