= Kirsten Lepore =

American animator

- Known for: Animation, stop motion
- Spouse(s): Daniel Kwan (m. 2016)
- Children: 1

Kirsten Lepore is an American animator, known for her stop-motion short films, including Sweet Dreams (2008), Bottle (2011), and Move Mountain (2013). She is known for her 2016 stop-motion episode of the American cartoon series Adventure Time entitled "Bad Jubies", as well as her work writing, directing, and executive producing the I Am Groot short series for Disney+.

== Education ==
Lepore was raised in South Brunswick, New Jersey. In an interview with The A.V. Club, Lepore explained that, as a child, she was fascinated by the animation techniques used by both Disney and the Jim Henson Company. Lepore attended South Brunswick High School, where she began to earnestly explore art, and as a young adult, she earned a Bachelor of Fine Arts at Maryland Institute College of Art, where she studied "experimental animation". Her undergraduate thesis was the short stop motion film entitled Sweet Dreams (2008). Following college, she applied to studios and freelanced on the side, but she "never heard back from the studios, and the freelance work kept coming." She returned to her parents' house and began working on ads and small production projects. During this phase in her life, she felt that she did not have enough technical expertise. As a result, she attended CalArts, graduating in 2012 with a Master of Fine Arts in experimental animation. Her graduate thesis, a short film entitled Move Mountain (2013), caught the attention of Adventure Time showrunner Adam Muto, and Lepore guest-animated the episode "Bad Jubies".

== Accolades ==
Lepore has won various awards, including a Student Annie Award, a South by Southwest special jury award for animation, and an Annecy + award for best animation. She has also won two Children's and Family Emmy Awards for her work on I Am Groot and the Gabby's Kid Power Challenge public service initiative, respectively.

== Personal life ==
Lepore has been married to fellow filmmaker and animator Daniel Kwan since 2016, and together they have one son.

== Selected filmography ==
Year	Title	Description	Role
2007	Story from North America	Short film	Director, animator
2008	Sweet Dreams	Short film, BFA thesis	Writer, director
2011	Bottle	Short film	Writer, director
2013	Move Mountain	Short film, MFA thesis	Writer, director
2014–15	"Bad Jubies"	Adventure Time episode	Writer, storyboard artist, director
2016	Hi Stranger	Short film	Writer, director, animator
2018	"It's My Party"	Summer Camp Island episode	Writer, storyboard artist
2021	Marcel the Shell with Shoes On	Film	Animation director
2022	Everything Everywhere All At Once	Film	Visual effects artist
2022–23	I Am Groot	Short film series	Writer, director, executive producer
