= Story from North America =

2007 short film

- Directed by: Kirsten Lepore; Garrett Davis
- Written by: Garret Davis
- Narrated by: Garret Davis
- Music by: Garret Davis
- Release date: May 2007
- Running time: 4.5 minutes
- Language: English

Story from North America is a 2007 American 2D animated short film directed by Kirsten Lepore and Garrett Davis. The animation achieved widespread exposure through internet platforms such as YouTube and marked the start of Lepore's public career in filmmaking.

== Plot ==
The whole Story from North America begins with a short scene of a man strumming a guitar in front of a crudely drawn map, announcing that he will tell "a story from North America." The shot then zooms into an area somewhere in the Midwestern United States or Southern Canada, focusing on a house before panning through an upstairs window into a child's bedroom. In the bed lays a frightened boy, and he shouts for his father to come in and help him. His father bursts in, asking what the commotion is all about. The boy says he spotted a spider on his floor, and asks his father to squish it. What follows is a continuing dialogue between the boy and his father regarding the importance of life, where the boy keeps expressing fear and disgust over the spider's physical form while the father implores him to overcome his fear and pride and to appreciate the uniqueness of life. The debate generally follows the themes of egalitarianism (the importance/equality of all life) and how unfounded paranoia or fear can lead to the destruction of life viewed as "less pretty."

== Music ==
The whole dialogue of the video is sung in a rather monotone voice, with an acoustic guitar being played over it as the sole instrumentation. The lyrics are sung by Garrett Davis, a musical artist who also worked on Off the Air (2011) and Utopia (2020). In a 2017 interview with the British online magazine Skwigly, Lepore said she had the idea to bring Garrett on the project for his "weirdly intimate, weirdly creepy kind of gender-ambiguous voice" that she thought would have fit the animation and tone of the film well. Garrett is also credited as co-director.

== Artstyle ==
The entire video is done in hand-drawn, hand-shaded pencil animation. The artstyle of the short film is very surrealist, with the depictions of human features at times appearing grossly exaggerated. The characters also change form on multiple occasions to represent their words. For instance, when the father reprimands his son for asking him to squish the spider, he asks:

You call me in here in the middle of the night

To come into your room and destroy life?

Is that what they teach you in Sunday school?

As he says this, he first morphs into a small atomic bomb to represent the rampant destruction of his son's fear, then into a floating caricature of the Devil. At another point, the father tells his son to "swallow his pride", at which point the son is depicted sitting at a table with utensils and a grotesque, hairy, heart-like organ on a plate in front of him.

== Recognition ==
The film achieved widespread exposure online, garnering over 13 million views on YouTube as of February 2026. It was also received generally positively, with reviewers on IMDb calling it "charming" and noting its "nostalgic" feel.
