= I Am Groot =

2022–2023 Marvel Studios animated shorts

- Genre: Comedy; Science fiction; Superhero
- Created by: Kirsten Lepore
- Based on: Marvel Comics
- Written by: Kirsten Lepore
- Directed by: Kirsten Lepore
- Starring: Vin Diesel; Bradley Cooper; Jeffrey Wright
- Composer: Daniele Luppi
- Country of origin: United States
- Original language: English
- No. of seasons: 2
- No. of episodes: 10

Production
- Executive producers: Brad Winderbaum; Kevin Feige; Louis D'Esposito; Victoria Alonso; James Gunn (season 1); Kirsten Lepore
- Producers: Carrie Wassenaar (season 1); Craig Rittenbaum (season 2); Alex Scharf (season 2)
- Editor: Dan Urrutia
- Running time: 4–6 minutes
- Production company: Marvel Studios Animation

Original release
- Network: Disney+
- Release: August 10, 2022 – September 6, 2023

Related
- Marvel Cinematic Universe television series

I Am Groot is an American series of animated shorts created by Kirsten Lepore for the streaming service Disney+, based on the Marvel Comics featuring the character Groot. Featuring characters from the Marvel Cinematic Universe (MCU) and sharing continuity with the films of the franchise, the series follows Baby Groot on various adventures that get him into trouble between the events of Guardians of the Galaxy (2014) and one of Guardians of the Galaxy Vol. 2's (2017) mid-credits scenes. The series is produced by Marvel Studios Animation, with Lepore serving as head writer and director.

Vin Diesel reprises his role as the voice of Baby Groot from the MCU films. Bradley Cooper also stars, with Jeffrey Wright starring in the second season. I Am Groot was announced in December 2020, and Luma Pictures began work on the series' photorealistic animation by August 2021. The involvement of Lepore was revealed that November.

I Am Groot premiered its first season with five shorts on Disney+ on August 10, 2022, as part of Phase Four of the MCU. A second season, also with five shorts, was released on September 6, 2023, as part of Phase Five.

== Premise ==
Each short follows Baby Groot as he grows up in the galaxy, going on adventures with new and unusual characters that get him into trouble.

== Cast and characters ==
- Vin Diesel as Baby Groot:
  A member of the Guardians of the Galaxy who is a tree-like humanoid. Executive producer Brad Winderbaum called Baby Groot "imperfect" who "doesn't always make the right choices, but learns from his mistakes", adding it was "fun to watch him fail, and it's even more fun to watch him succeed".
- Bradley Cooper as Rocket:
  A member of the Guardians who is a genetically modified raccoon bounty hunter and a master of weapons and military tactics. Director Kirsten Lepore described Rocket as "bit of a scolding parent" towards Groot, but still his friend "with a soft heart", with Winderbaum stating that Rocket feels responsible for Groot as "an unlikely parent".
- Jeffrey Wright as the Watcher: A member of the alien Watcher race who observes the multiverse. Wright reprises his role from the animated series What If...?.

Additionally, James Gunn voices a wrist watch and Trevor Devall voices Iwua, a shapeshifting alien who mimics Groot, in the first season.

== Episodes ==
Animated series in the Marvel Cinematic Universe
Season	Episodes	Originally released
1	5	August 10, 2022
2	5	September 6, 2023

=== Season 1 (2022) ===
No. overall	No. in season	Title	Directed by	Written by	Original release date
1	1	"Groot's First Steps"	Kirsten Lepore	Kirsten Lepore	August 10, 2022
While growing in a pot, Baby Groot is tended by robots. When a crack appears on his pot, the robots replace Groot with a bonsai plant. Out of jealousy, Groot attacks the plant and they both fall onto the floor, resulting in their pots breaking and Groot taking his first steps.
2	2	"The Little Guy"	Kirsten Lepore	Kirsten Lepore	August 10, 2022
Baby Groot finds tiny blue Grunds under a rock and plays with them, only for the Grunds to see this as an attack and launch a counterattack. A frightened Groot farts a leaf, which the Grunds find as their food source. Groot finds a nearby bush to give the Grunds additional food, only to accidentally step on them upon returning.
3	3	"Groot's Pursuit"	Kirsten Lepore	Kirsten Lepore	August 10, 2022
Waking up in the middle of the night in the Eclector's Quadrant, Baby Groot finds a broken vial and traces the bubble-colored liquid from it around the ship. This is revealed to be Iwua, a shape-shifting alien who impersonates him. The pair dance, with the alien teaching him dance steps, until Groot ejects Iwua out of the ship via the airlock.
4	4	"Groot Takes a Bath"	Kirsten Lepore	Kirsten Lepore	August 10, 2022
Baby Groot finds a pool of mud and takes a bath. He soon finds leaves growing out of him, due to the mud, and grooms them in different styles which results in a nearby Gangalorian squirrel bird becoming irritated. Groot eventually uses all of the pool's mud and can no longer grow the leaves. As the squirrel bird laughs at him, Groot trims its hair to use as a scarf.
5	5	"Magnum Opus"	Kirsten Lepore	Kirsten Lepore	August 10, 2022
Baby Groot gathers various items inside the ship to draw the Guardians of the Galaxy, including causing an explosion to create glitter. Rocket finds Groot trying to fix a hole caused by the explosion. Groot gives the drawing to Rocket, who is almost sucked out of the ship before Groot saves him.

=== Season 2 (2023) ===
No. overall	No. in season	Title	Directed by	Written by	Original release date
6	1	"Are You My Groot?"	Kirsten Lepore	Kirsten Lepore	September 6, 2023
On an alien planet, Baby Groot finds a strange egg in a nest. He adopts and makes it as his own child, but is annoyed by its constant pooping nature. When its siblings run over Groot for their mother, she comes to carry them away, while Groot looks at them emotionally.
7	2	"Groot Noses Around"	Kirsten Lepore	Kirsten Lepore	September 6, 2023
While searching for batteries for his video game controller, Baby Groot gains the sense of smell after getting a prosthetic nose attached to his face. But, after recognizing his place's odor, he decides to detach his face from the nose shortly after retrieving the batteries.
8	3	"Groot's Snow Day"	Kirsten Lepore	Kirsten Lepore	September 6, 2023
After arriving on a snowy planet, Baby Groot plays in the snow and decides to build a robot snowman, only for it to suddenly go rogue, threatening him and the ship. He only manages to defeat it by exploiting how the head comprised an engine part that would ignite after a concussive hit, provided by a well-placed snowball throw. Despite its destruction, however, life remains in one of its remnant eyes.
9	4	"Groot's Sweet Treat"	Kirsten Lepore	Kirsten Lepore	September 6, 2023
Baby Groot sees an ice cream truck–esque spaceship floating outside the ship. Wanting to eat some ice cream, Baby Groot searches for money through the ship, ultimately finding some after breaking a claw machine, only to discover the ship has already left. Desperate, Baby Groot chases after the spaceship in a capsule, resulting in a crash that destroys both vehicles as Baby Groot eats the remaining ice cream surrounded by Nova Corps patrol ships.
10	5	"Groot and the Great Prophecy"	Kirsten Lepore	Kirsten Lepore	September 6, 2023
The Watcher narrates as Baby Groot wanders through the temple of a sacred seed. But, he accidentally loses the seed to burning lava and then the temple collapses. Among the debris, Baby Groot emerges with leaves grown and the Watcher understands (metaphorically) that Groot is the seed rising from the ground.

== Production ==
=== Development ===
In December 2020, Marvel Studios president Kevin Feige announced I Am Groot, a series of short films starring Baby Groot. Around then, Marvel Studios' head of streaming, television and animation Brad Winderbaum chose Kirsten Lepore to direct the shorts, which would have "little-to-no dialogue". Marvel Studios was looking for a way to return to the Baby Groot character after his appearance in Guardians of the Galaxy Vol. 2 (2017) since they felt there was "a whole universe of stories to tell" with him as a toddler. They also were drawn to early Mickey Mouse and Donald Duck short films as a way to "go back to that early Disney animation short-form style of storytelling". Lepore was announced as director of the shorts during the Disney+ Day event in November 2021; she is also the series' head writer.

I Am Groot is produced by Marvel Studios Animation, with the first season consisting of five shorts totaling approximately 15 minutes. The shorts are executive produced by Lepore and Marvel Studios' Feige, Louis D'Esposito, Victoria Alonso, and Winderbaum, with James Gunn, the writer and director of the Guardians of the Galaxy films, serving as an executive producer on the first season. Production on five additional shorts was underway by July 2022, described as a second season. Lepore said this second collection of shorts would be "in the same spirit" as the first, and features ideas she had that did not make the first collection of shorts. For each season, 30 ideas for shorts were conceived that were then presented to Marvel Studios to choose from. Lepore felt if Marvel Studios wished to make more shorts, they had "no shortage of ideas".

=== Writing ===
Lepore drew inspiration from her son, and said the series uses science fiction elements to explore Groot's regular childhood moments. She met with Gunn throughout the process to ensure that she was accurately portraying Baby Groot, who Gunn described to her as a "bad baby". Lepore was also inspired by Looney Tunes as well as a Buster Keaton style of smart, physical comedy, which Feige and Winderbaum were also excited to explore. Marvel Studios was able to create animatics more easily given I Am Groot is shorts, allowing them to "play with bits and... concepts" to see what worked and find the identity of the series.

For the first short, "Groot's First Steps", Lepore wanted to explore Groot growing out of his pot, and was able to incorporate that with another idea of Groot, a sentient tree, going up against a non-sentient tree, which allowed her to explore Keaton physical comedy "in which the inanimate object always wins". "Groot's Pursuit" was conceived thinking about how children can mimic one another, resulting in one getting frustrated by it. Lepore was also interested in exploring Groot's physical abilities, which led to the short "Groot Takes a Bath". She described Groot as becoming a Chia Pet, which resulted in "a very fun arena to play in".

For the second season, Lepore described the shorts as showing Groot "beginning to grow up", with the shorts having him learn about parenthood, the importance of cleanliness and hygiene, "how not to pilot a ship", and starting on "his path to becoming a hero". The first short was "very autobiographical" for Lepore, with Groot needing to show his parenting skills, believing the short "did a good job of capturing the whole 360 of that experience, the good with the bad and the fun and the exhausting". Lepore was "shocked" that Marvel Studios selected the short in which Groot gets a nose, calling it the "weirdest" one. That episode had included Groot realizing an ice cube did not have any smell, but was cut since it "didn't quite work". The fifth short in the second season sees the Watcher make an appearance. Lepore noted their idea for this short was one Marvel Studios chose, which she felt was "sort of giving us that blessing to go ahead and pursue it" and his appearance it allowed them to "write some pretty fun ridiculous things"; Indiana Jones served as a reference for this episode. Story editor Ryan Little served as the script coordinator on What If...? and was familiar with how the Watcher's character had been written in that series, with Lepore saying I Am Groot was still able to show a different side of the character that was able to "infuse a little bit of comedy" into the short.

Gunn said the series was not necessarily connected to his Guardians of the Galaxy films, and described them as being "canon to themselves" in the Marvel Cinematic Universe (MCU). Joshua Meyer from /Film likened this to the Team Thor mockumentary shorts which he called a "funny bit of apocrypha that isn't essential to MCU continuity". Winderbaum said the shorts were set between the end of Guardians of the Galaxy Vol. 2 and that film's mid-credits scene which featured a teenage Groot, with Lepore adding that it also showed events between the end of Guardians of the Galaxy (2014) and the start of Guardians of the Galaxy Vol. 2. Gunn later stated he found it hard to see how they were "canonically MCU" despite Marvel saying they were. Other members of the Guardians of the Galaxy do not appear in the series, outside of Rocket, as the creatives were interested in focusing on Groot and "getting to know his character better" while also exploring the fun of seeing "what he does when nobody's looking" since "that's where he gets into the most trouble".

=== Casting ===
Vin Diesel was confirmed to be reprising his role as the voice of Baby Groot in June 2022. Diesel recorded new lines for the shorts, after it was initially discussed to reuse existing recordings of him saying "I am Groot" for the series. The next month, Bradley Cooper was revealed to be reprising his MCU role as the voice of Rocket, as well as Gunn voicing a wrist watch. Trevor Devall voices Iwua. Bob Bergen, Terri Douglas, Scott Menville, Kaitlyn Robrock, Fred Tatasciore, Kari Wahlgren, and Matthew Wood provide additional voices. Jeffrey Wright appears in the second season as the Watcher, reprising his role from the animated series What If...?, with Cooper and Tatasciore returning for the season. Dee Bradley Baker provides the voices of the various birds in the first short of the second season.

=== Design ===
Baby Groot is the same model designed by Luma Pictures for Vol. 2. Lepore enjoyed designing the Grunds, seen in "Little Guys", and finding the way to make them be expressive with "just black dots and a mouth". Other original designs for the series included Iwua, the shapeshifting alien, and Snoot Pin Bongo, a squirrel-like creature inspired by the Star Wars character Salacious Crumb. Color choices played a big role in the series, with respect to the already established color pallette and combinations in the MCU that "have certain connotations". In the second season, the short "Groot Noses Around" features a 16-bit fighting game, informally known as Beach Fighters, that was created by pixel artist and animator Jon Davies.

Perception created the titles for I Am Groot. The series presents the Marvel Studios opening and fanfare fast-forwarding. Lepore was looking to get "really irreverent" with the opening, with Winderbaum adding the studio was always looking for ways to shorten the opening. The creatives liked this since it helped balance the runtime of the shorts without having "a minute-and-a-half opening" along with "a five-minute credit sequence", with Lepore calling it the perfect design for Groot. For the second season, the opening was changed from the "standard television" fast-forwarding visual to a step-through style, more akin to how Disney+ handles fast-forward. This change was also retroactively applied to the first season episodes.

=== Animation and editing ===
Visual effects and animation for the series were created by Luma Pictures, which was joined by Trixter for the second season short "Groot's Snow Day". Work on the series' photorealistic animation style began by August 2021. Winderbaum explained that Marvel Studios wanted I Am Groot to feel "directly rooted in the language of the films", which is why they chose visual effects company Luma Pictures to animate the series since they previously designed and worked on Baby Groot for Vol. 2. Winderbaum highlighted how Lepore's experience working with stop motion animation translated to her directing computer-generated animation. When talking to Lepore, Gunn compared Baby Groot's poses and facial expressions to emojis due the character's face just having eyes and a mouth.

Initial conceptions of the episodes in the storyboard and animatic stages resulted in the shorts being about five minutes long. Lepore was aiming for each short to be approximately three minutes in length, and made refinements and "edited very carefully" to get them to that runtime.

== Music ==
Daniele Luppi served as the composer for I Am Groot. Lepore chose Luppi to score the series given his past work with an electronic sound, which helped translate to the "strange" sound she was looking for. She added that his score "sounds like it came out of a Spaghetti Western with the same kind of patina on it from that era". Luppi used old microphones, keyboards, and other analog instruments to give his score an "authentic, more organic sound". A single featuring the songs "Groot Bossa Nova" and "Groot Tuttifrutti" from the shorts was released digitally by Marvel Music and Hollywood Records on August 4, 2022.

Lepore wanted to feature music from the 1960s and 1970s, and looked at music from around the world instead of just the United States, to differentiate it from the music featured in the Guardians of the Galaxy films. Licensed songs in the series include "In the Hall of the Mountain Queen" by Raymond Scott in "Groot's First Steps", which Lepore noted instantly gives the short a "really weird flavor, this spacey, early electro feel", "Ran Kan Kan" by Tito Puente in "Groot's Pursuit", and "You Can Get It If You Really Want" by Jimmy Cliff in "Magnum Opus".

In the second season, "Groot's Sweet Treat" includes "The Entertainer" by Scott Joplin, a common song used by ice cream trucks, and is augmented into "a ridiculous '90s club banger", with the episode also featuring Mikky Ekko singing the end credits song. Luppi created a chip tune track for the video game Groot is playing in the "Groot Noses Around" short.

== Marketing ==
Brief footage from the series was shown during Disney's annual meeting of shareholders in March 2022 within a content highlight reel. The first poster for the series, announcing its release date, was revealed on June 5, which made the series "immediately [begin] trending online". According to Variety's Trending TV chart, it amassed 231,000 user engagements, which measure the combination of tweets, retweets, likes, and hashtags, the second most for the week of May 30 to June 5, behind the Netflix series Stranger Things. Marvel Studios partnered with Wonderful Pistachios and Framestore for a "Groot Gets Crackin'" marketing campaign, featuring Groot across television advertisements, digital and social media posts, and limited-edition packaging for their pistachios, as well as in-store displays until August 31. A 15-second television spot was released on June 6, as part of the campaign. Tickets to attend Marvel's Avengers S.T.A.T.I.O.N. in Las Vegas were also set to be given out randomly to customers who bought their pistachios as part of the campaign.

The short "Magnum Opus" debuted at the El Capitan Theatre, appearing before select screenings of the MCU film Thor: Love and Thunder (2022), from July 18 to 24. The short "Groot Takes a Bath" was shown during Marvel Studios' animation panel at San Diego Comic-Con on July 22, where Lepore discussed the series and a trailer for all of the shorts was also released. Posters for each short were released ahead of their premiere.

A trailer for the second season was released on August 6, 2023, in honor of National Tree Day. Kieran Fisher from Looper said the trailer "provide[s] plenty of fun moments", calling it "an experience and then some". Fisher also noted the appearance of the Watcher in the trailer, believing the cameo indicated the new shorts would be "full of unexpected surprises".

== Release ==
I Am Groot premiered with five shorts on Disney+ on August 10, 2022, as part of Phase Four of the MCU. The first season was made available on Marvel HQ's YouTube channel on September 1, 2023. A second season, consisting of five additional shorts, was released on September 6, 2023, as part of Phase Five of the MCU.

== Reception ==
=== Audience viewership ===
I Am Groot was the third highest streaming series for viewers in the United States for the week ending August 14, 2022, according to Whip Media's TV Time.

=== Critical response ===
The review aggregator website Rotten Tomatoes reported an 87% approval rating, with an average score of 7.70/10, based on 15 reviews. The website's critics consensus reads: "He is Groot, and that novelty alone ought to give MCU fans a rooting interest in this slight but fun series of hijinks."

Matt Fowler of IGN gave I Am Groot 7 out of 10, finding the shorts "adorable as an animated offshoot of the MCU but also contain a quirky dark humor thanks to [Baby] Groot's own temper and penchant for getting punchy." Fowler noted how Groot's prickliness was "a saving grace... as these types of shorts rarely showcase a brat." Andrew Webster of The Verge considered the series as one of the greatest animated shorts on Disney+, feeling the shorts were "fun and goofy". Webster also found that the short runtime "works well here — the gimmick doesn't last long enough to overstay its welcome." Variety's Wilson Chapman said I Am Groot was "charming, briskly paced and — in a rarity for a Marvel streaming TV show — completely self-contained, with no cameos or set-ups for another show to speak-of". Brett White from Decider likened the series to Looney Tunes with "mayhem in the best way possible" and called I Am Groot "a damn delight from beginning to end", saying, "Each short zips along at a perfect pace, deploying sight gags that hit their mark every time." White was frustrated, however, with each short being their own entry on Disney+ rather than collected under one title. Nick Schager at The Daily Beast was positive on the shorts, saying their "brevity prevents it from growing stale, and yet given that each chapter runs only four minutes, a little extra time might have let it playfully elaborate upon its conceits". He also enjoyed the animation, saying I Am Groot "boasts a handsome vibrancy and level of detail".

Reviewing the second season, Luke Y. Thompson at SuperHeroHype gave it 5 out of 5 saying, "These shorts may not advance the grand Marvel sagas forward, but as snippets of a space kid's story, they're both remarkably photoreal and perfectly charming."

=== Accolades ===
Accolades received by I Am Groot
Award	Date of ceremony	Category	Recipient	Result	Ref.
AACTA Awards	February 10, 2024	Best Visual Effects or Animation	Kirsten Lepore, Brad Winderbaum, Raphael de Almeida Pimentel, Adam Goins	Nominated	
Annie Awards	February 17, 2024	Outstanding Achievement for Editorial in an Animated Television / Broadcast Production	Dan Urrutia (for "Groot's Snow Day")	Nominated	
Children's and Family Emmy Awards	December 16, 2023	Outstanding Short Form Program	I Am Groot	Won	
Children's and Family Emmy Awards	December 16, 2023	Outstanding Sound Mixing and Sound Editing for an Animated Program	Coya Elliott, Tony Villaflor, Kyrsten Mate, Anele Onyekwere, Tom Kramer, James Spencer, Malcolm Fife, Shelley Roden, John Roesch, Scott Curtis	Won	
Children's and Family Emmy Awards	March 15, 2025	Outstanding Short Form Animated Program	I Am Groot	Nominated	
Children's and Family Emmy Awards	March 15, 2025	Outstanding Sound Mixing and Sound Editing for an Animated Program	Kyrsten Mate, Danielle Dupre, Jonathan Greber, Anele Onyekwere, Tom Kramer, David Farmer, Devon Kelley, Margie O'Malley, Frank Rinella	Nominated	
NAACP Image Awards	March 16, 2024	Outstanding Short-Form Series (Drama or Comedy)	I Am Groot	Nominated	
