= Adventure Time =

American animated television series

- Also known as: Adventure Time with Finn & Jake
- Genre: Science fantasy Adventure Surreal comedy Coming-of-age
- Created by: Pendleton Ward
- Showrunners: Pendleton Ward (Note: Seasons 1–5.); Adam Muto (Note: Seasons 5–10.)
- Directed by: Larry Leichliter (Note: Larry Leichliter served as director until the fifth-season episode "Bad Little Boy". After this episode, the term was phased out in favor of "supervising director", and the following have served in this role: Nate Cash (season 5), Adam Muto (seasons 5–9), Elizabeth Ito (seasons 5–9), Kent Osborne (season 6), Andres Salaff (seasons 6–8), Cole Sanchez (seasons 6, 8–10), and Diana Lafyatis (season 10). Guest directors for the series have included: David OReilly ("A Glitch Is a Glitch"), Masaaki Yuasa ("Food Chain"), David Ferguson ("Water Park Prank"), and Kristen Lepore ("Bad Jubies"). Since the first season, the show has also had an art director; Nick Jennings (seasons 1–6) and Sandra Lee (seasons 6–10).)
- Voices of: Jeremy Shada; John DiMaggio; Hynden Walch; Tom Kenny; Olivia Olson; Niki Yang
- Opening theme: "Adventure Time" by Pendleton Ward
- Ending theme: "Island Song (Come Along With Me)" by Lake
- Composers: Casey James Basichis; Tim Kiefer
- Country of origin: United States
- Original language: English
- No. of seasons: 10
- No. of episodes: 283 (Note: 282 regular, plus one special. Ten shorts (i.e., mini-episodes roughly two minutes in length) were also produced.) (list of episodes)

Production
- Executive producers: Fred Seibert; Derek Drymon; Curtis Lelash; Jennifer Pelphrey; Brian A. Miller; Rob Sorcher; Pendleton Ward; Adam Muto
- Producer: Kelly Crews
- Running time: 11 minutes
- Production companies: Frederator Studios; Cartoon Network Studios

Original release
- Network: Cartoon Network
- Release: April 5, 2010 – September 3, 2018

Related
- Adventure Time franchise

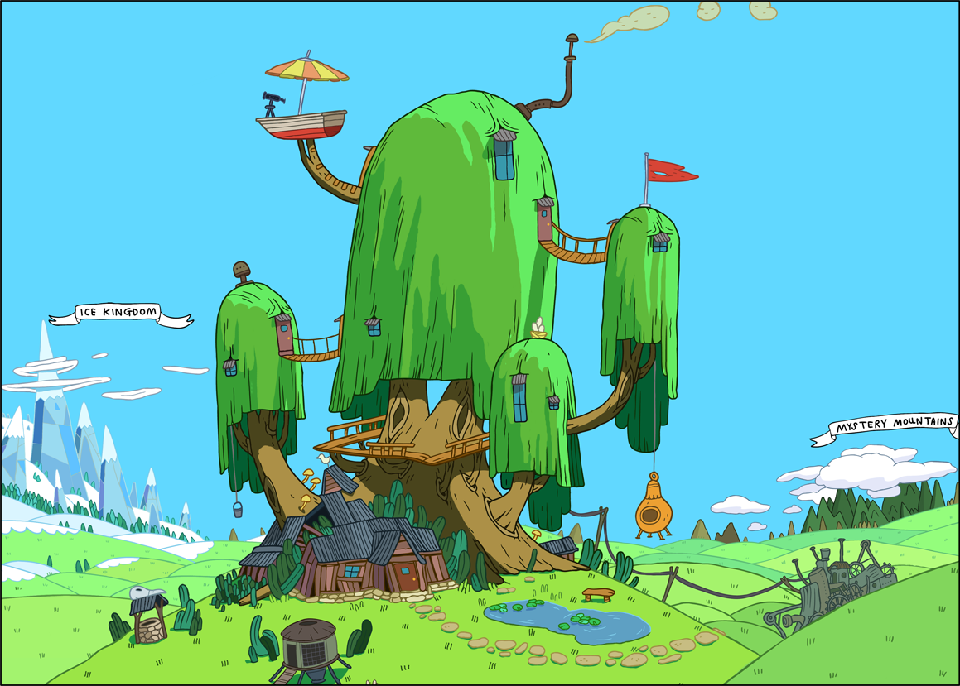
The Tree House from Adventure Time

Adventure Time (Note: In its first season, the series was often billed as Adventure Time with Finn & Jake because the producers were unsure at the time whether they could secure the rights to the simpler title Adventure Time.) is an American animated fantasy television series created by Pendleton Ward for Cartoon Network. It follows the adventures of a boy named Finn (Jeremy Shada) and his best friend and adoptive brother Jake (John DiMaggio)—a dog with the power to change size and shape at will. Finn and Jake live in the post-apocalyptic Land of Ooo, where they interact with Princess Bubblegum (Hynden Walch), the Ice King (Tom Kenny), Marceline the Vampire Queen (Olivia Olson), BMO (Niki Yang), and others. It was produced by Cartoon Network Studios and Frederator Studios.

Ward's creation is based on his 2007 short film that aired on Nicktoons as a pilot on Frederator's Random! Cartoons. After the short became a viral hit on the Internet, Nickelodeon's executives passed on its option before Cartoon Network commissioned a full-length series from Fred Seibert and Ward, which was previewed on March 11, 2010. The same year, the series premiered on Cartoon Network on April 5, and it ended its eight-year run on September 3, 2018. The series has since been succeeded by several spin-offs and follow-up shows, starting with the Adventure Time: Distant Lands specials in 2020.

The series drew inspiration from a variety of sources, including the fantasy role-playing game Dungeons & Dragons and video games. It was produced using hand-drawn animation; action and dialogue for episodes were decided by storyboard artists based on rough outlines. Because each episode took roughly eight to nine months to complete, multiple episodes were worked on concurrently. The cast members recorded their lines in group recordings, and the series regularly employed guest actors for minor and recurring characters. Each episode runs for about eleven minutes; pairs of episodes are often telecast to fill half-hour program slots.

Adventure Time was a ratings success for Cartoon Network, with some of its episodes attracting over three million viewers. It has been praised for its originality and worldbuilding. The show won eight Primetime Emmy Awards, a Peabody Award, three Annie Awards, two British Academy Children's Awards, a Motion Picture Sound Editors Award, and a Kerrang! Award. The series has also been nominated for three Critics' Choice Television Awards, two Annecy Festival Awards, a TCA Award, and a Sundance Film Festival Award, among others. Of the many comic book spin-offs based on the series, one received an Eisner Award and two Harvey Awards. It has also spawned various forms of licensed merchandise, including books, video games and clothing.

== Premise ==
Adventure Time follows the adventures of a boy, named Finn the Human, and his best friend and adoptive brother, Jake the Dog, who has magical powers to change shape and size at will. Pendleton Ward, the series' creator, describes Finn as a "fiery little kid with strong morals". Jake, on the other hand, is based on Tripper Harrison, Bill Murray's character in Meatballs. This means that while Jake is somewhat carefree, he will "sit [Finn] down and give him some decent advice if he really needs it". Finn and Jake live in the post-apocalyptic Land of Ooo, which was ravaged by a cataclysmic event known as the "Mushroom War", a nuclear war that destroyed civilization a thousand years before the series' events.

Throughout the series, Finn and Jake interact with major characters, including Princess Bubblegum, the sovereign of the Candy Kingdom and a sentient piece of gum; the Ice King, a menacing but largely misunderstood ice wizard; Marceline the Vampire Queen, a thousand-year-old vampire and rock music enthusiast; Lumpy Space Princess (Pendleton Ward), a melodramatic and immature princess made out of "lumps"; BMO, a sentient video game console-shaped robot that lives with Finn and Jake; and Flame Princess (Jessica DiCicco), a flame elemental and ruler of the Fire Kingdom.

== Development ==
=== Concept and creation ===
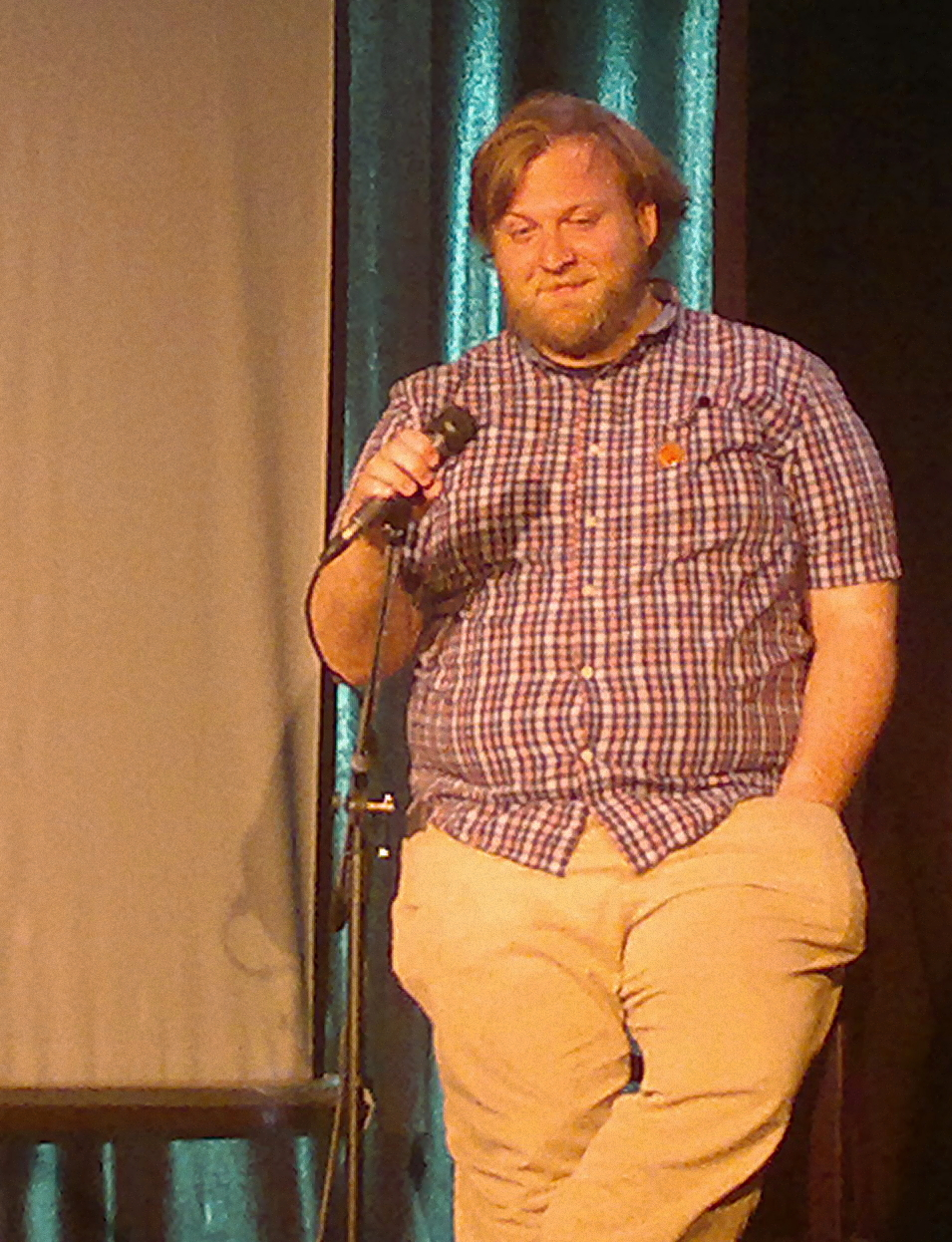
Pendleton Ward, the creator of the show

According to series creator Pendleton Ward, the show's style was influenced by his time attending the California Institute of the Arts (CalArts) and his experiences working as a writer and storyboard artist on The Marvelous Misadventures of Flapjack, a series that ran on Cartoon Network from 2008 until 2010. In an interview with Animation World Network, Ward said he strove to combine Adventure Time's subversive humor with "beautiful" moments, using Hayao Miyazaki's film My Neighbor Totoro as inspiration for the latter. Ward has also named Home Movies and Dr. Katz, Professional Therapist as influences, largely because both shows are "relaxing" and feature "conversational dialogue that feels natural [and is neither] over the top [nor] cartoony and shrill".

The series traces its origins to a seven-minute, stand-alone animated short film of the same name (this short was later identified as the show's pilot post factum). Produced by Frederator Studios, the short was created by Ward almost entirely by himself, and its production concluded in early 2006. It was first broadcast on Nicktoons Network on January 11, 2007, and was re-broadcast as part of Frederator's anthology show Random! Cartoons on December 7, 2008. After its initial release, the video became a viral hit on the Internet. Frederator then pitched an Adventure Time series to Nicktoons Network, which rejected it five times. When Nicktoons' rights to commission a full series expired, Frederator pitched it to other channels. One of the studios that Frederator approached was Cartoon Network, which was interested in producing a full series, but would commit to a deal only if Ward could prove the pilot "wasn't a one-hit wonder". Rob Sorcher, the chief content officer at Cartoon Network, was influential in getting the network to take a chance on the show; he recognized the series as "something that felt really indie ... comic book-y [and] new".

Cartoon Network asked Ward to submit a sample script for their consideration, but Frederator convinced him to rough out a storyboard instead, as "a board would give a better sense of what was on Pen's mind", according to Frederator's vice president Eric Homan. Ward and his college friends Patrick McHale and Adam Muto (who both would go on to take significant roles in the series' production) began developing ideas, all the while concentrating on "keep[ing] the good things about the original short [while also] improv[ing] on" them. The group's first product was a rough storyboard featuring Finn and Princess Bubblegum going on a spaghetti-supper date. After Cartoon Network rejected the initial story, Ward, McHale, and Muto storyboarded "The Enchiridion!" to emulate the original Nicktoons short. This tactic proved successful, and in August 2008, Cartoon Network approved a first season, which was produced by Cartoon Network Studios. "The Enchiridion!" was the first episode to enter into production.

Ward and his production team began storyboarding episodes and writing plot outlines, but Cartoon Network was still concerned about the direction of the new series. McHale later recalled that during the pitch of an episode titled "Brothers in Insomnia" (which, for various reasons, was scrapped) the room was filled with executives from Cartoon Network. The pitch went well, but the production staff was soon inundated with questions about the stylistic nature of the series. Around this time, Cartoon Network paused the production of the show in an attempt to resolve these creative issues. A number of writers and animators were let go, and in their place, Cartoon Network management hired three veteran animators who had worked on SpongeBob SquarePants: Derek Drymon (who served as executive producer for the first season of Adventure Time), Merriwether Williams (who served as head story editor for the show's first and second seasons), and Nick Jennings (who became the series' long-serving art director). Drymon, in particular, played a key role at this time, ensuring that both Cartoon Network and the show's production crew were on the same creative page. Thurop Van Orman, the creator of The Marvelous Misadventures of Flapjack, was also hired to guide Ward and his staff for the first two seasons. The storyboard for "Prisoners of Love" assuaged many of the fears some Cartoon Network executives had expressed.

As production for season one progressed, more artists were brought on board. Dan "Ghostshrimp" Bandit, a freelance illustrator who had also written and storyboarded on Flapjack, was hired as the show's lead background designer; Ward told him to create background art that set the show "in a 'Ghostshrimp World'". Ghostshrimp designed major locations, including Finn and Jake's home, the Candy Kingdom, and the Ice Kingdom. The position of lead character designer was given to Phil Rynda, who held this role for two and a half seasons. The show's lead production crew (which included Ward and McHale) was initially hesitant to bring him on board, but they were soon convinced by director Larry Leichliter, who assured them Rynda was talented and could draw in a variety of styles. With the producers satisfied, Rynda quickly began designing characters that were simple but still fell in line with "Pen's natural aesthetic". Around this time, Rynda and McHale began drafting artistic guidelines for the show, so that its animation style would always be somewhat consistent. With many of the lead production roles filled, Ward turned his attention to choosing storyboard artists for the first season. He assembled a team made up largely of "younger, inexperienced people", many of whom he discovered on the Internet. Many of these individuals had backgrounds in indie comics, and Ward has called them "really smart, smartypants people" who were responsible for inserting more idiosyncratic and spiritual ideas into the series.

For the show's first four and a half seasons, Ward served as the showrunner. In an interview with Rolling Stone, he said he had stepped down from this role sometime during the fifth season. As a naturally shy person, he found interacting with and directing people every day to be exhausting. After Ward resigned from the post, Adam Muto became the showrunner. Until late 2014, Ward continued to work on the series as a storyboard artist and storyline writer. After November 2014, he stopped regularly contributing to episode outlines, but still looked over stories, provided occasional input, and continued to storyboard for the series on a limited basis.

=== Production ===
==== Writing and storyboarding ====
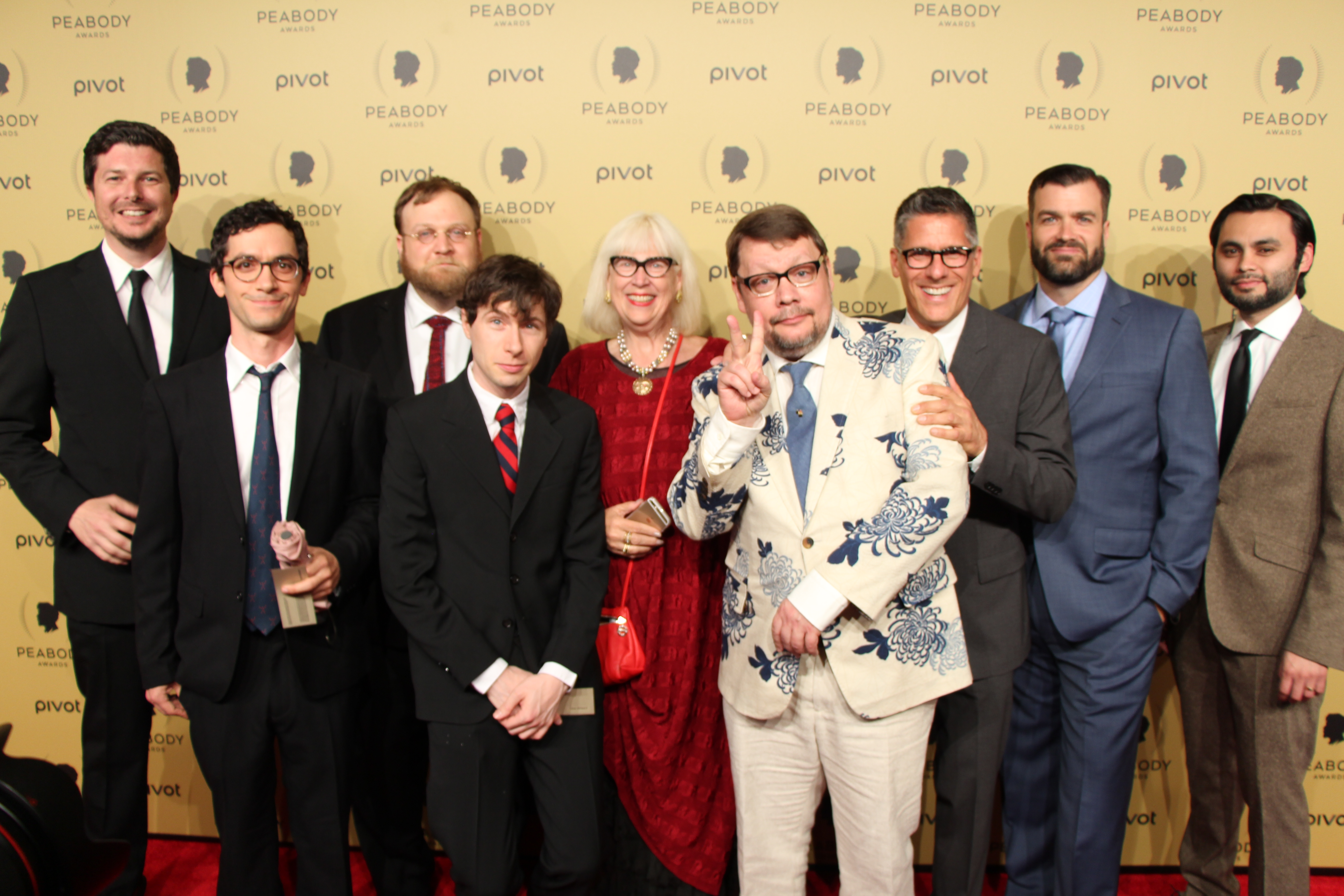
The crew of Adventure Time at the 74th Annual Peabody Awards in 2014. From left to right: Kent Osborne, Tom Herpich, Pendleton Ward, Patrick McHale, Betty Ward, Jack Pendarvis, Rob Sorcher, Curtis LeLash and Adam Muto.

A storyboard panel drawn by Adam Muto for the episode "What Was Missing" showing action, dialogue, and sound effects. Adventure Time is a storyboard-driven series, meaning that the storyboard artists are also writers, allowing them to draft the dialogue and the action how they see fit.

Ward—a self-professed fan of ambivalent emotions, such as feeling "happy and scared at the same time"—has called the show a "dark comedy". He has also cited the fantasy role-playing game Dungeons & Dragons—of which many of the show's writers are devotees—as an inspiration for the show. In the United States, the series is rated TV-PG; Ward said he never wanted to push the boundaries of the PG rating, noting in an interview with Art of the Title that he "never really even thought about the rating ... we don't like stuff that's overly gross. We like cute stuff and nice things". Ward intended the show's world to have a coherent physical logic, and although magic exists in the story, the show's writers tried to create an internal consistency in the characters' interactions with the world.

In an interview with The A.V. Club, Ward said the show's writing process usually began with the writers telling each other what they had done the previous week to find something humorous to build on. He also said, "A lot of the time, if we're really stuck, we'll start saying everything that comes to our mind, which is usually the worst stuff, and then someone else will think that's terrible but it'll give him a better idea and the ball just starts rolling like that". Because of the busy schedule of writing and coordinating a television series, the writers did not have time to play Dungeons and Dragons, but they still wrote stories they would "want to be playing D&D with". Sometimes, the writers and storyboard artists convened and played writing games. One game that was often used is called exquisite corpse, which one writer starts a story on a sheet of paper, and another writer tries to finish it. However, while a few episodes (such as the fifth-season episode "Puhoy" and the sixth-season episode "Jake the Brick") have been generated using this game, Ward has said that "the ideas are usually terrible". Former storyboard artist and creative director Cole Sanchez said episode scripts are either created by expanding the good ideas produced by these writing games, or are based on an idea proposed by a storyboard artist in the hope it can be developed into an episode.

After the writers pitched stories, the ideas were compiled onto a two-or-three-page outline that contained "the important beats". The episodes were then passed to storyboard artists (often called "boarders"). While many cartoons are based on script pitches to network executives, Cartoon Network allowed Adventure Time to "build their own teams organically" and communicate using storyboards and animatics. Rob Sorcher said this novel approach was sanctioned because the company was dealing with "primarily visual people", and that by using storyboards, the writers and artists could learn and grow "by actually doing the work". The storyboard artists generally worked on an episode in pairs, independent from other storyboarders, which, according to freelance writer David Perlmutter in his book America Toons In, countered creative ennui and prevented episodes from being "alike in either content or tone". The storyboard artists were given a week to "thumbnail" (roughly sketch out) a storyboard and fill in the details complete with action, dialogue, and humor. The series' showrunner and his creative directors then reviewed the storyboard and made notes. The artists were then given another week to implement the notes and to clean up the episode. Storyboard writing and revising usually took up to a month.

==== Animation ====
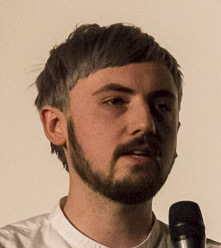
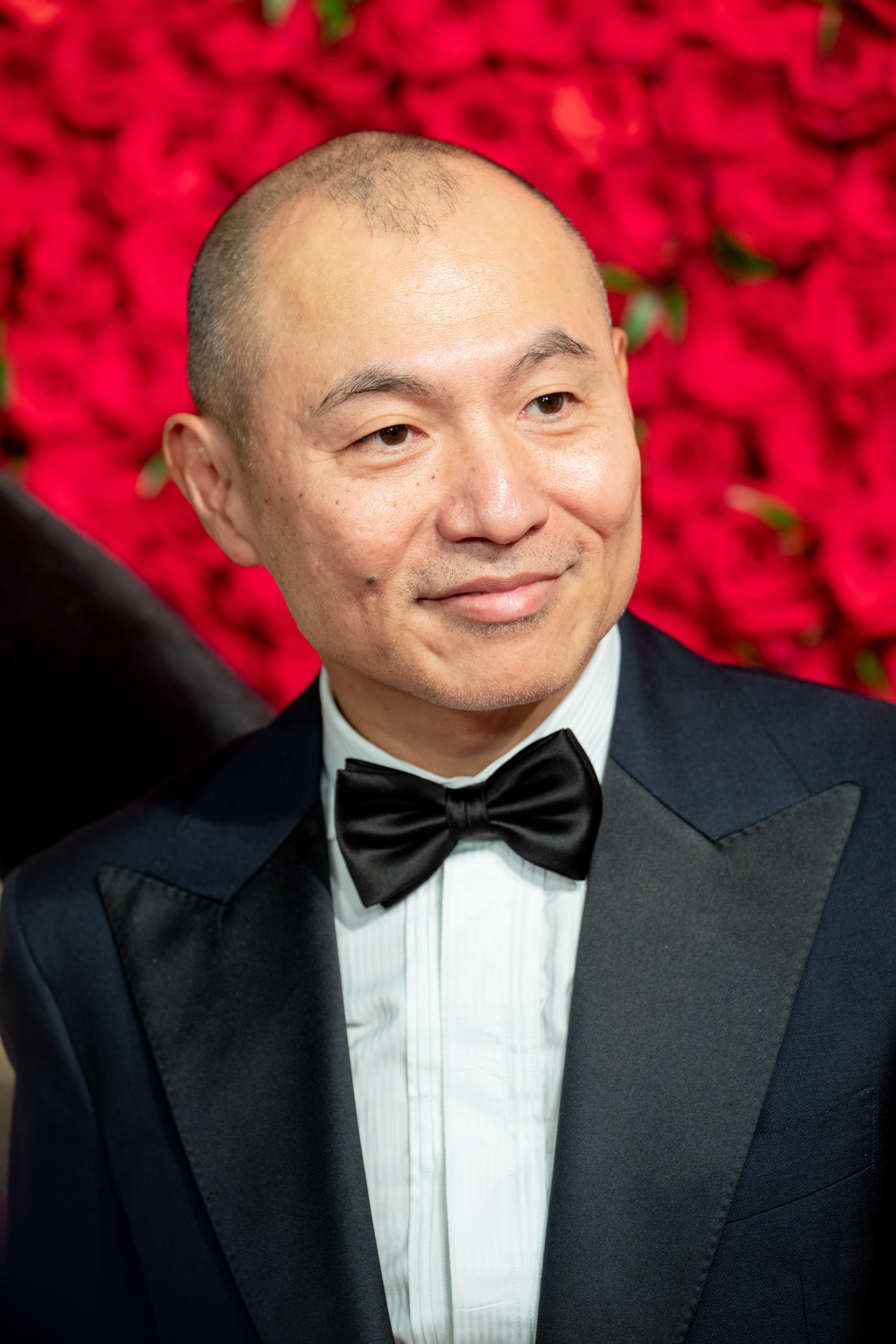
Two of the guest animators who worked on Adventure Time, David OReilly (left) and Masaaki Yuasa (right)

Following the writing revisions, voice actors would record their parts for the episodes and an animatic would be compiled to reduce the running time to the necessary 11 minutes. Specialized artists then created prop, character, and background designs. According to Rynda, most of this pre-production was done in Photoshop. While the episodes' design and coloring was done at Cartoon Network Studios in Burbank, California, the actual animation was handled in South Korea by either Rough Draft Korea or Saerom Animation. Animating an episode often took between three and five months. The animation was hand-drawn on paper, which was then digitally composited and painted with digital ink and paint. Executive producer Fred Seibert compared the show's animation style to that of Felix the Cat and various Max Fleischer cartoons, but said its world was equally inspired by "the world of videogames [sic]".

While the episodes were being handled in South Korea, the production crew in the U.S. worked on retakes, music scoring, and sound design. Upon being completed, the animation was sent back to the U.S., at which point the production crew inspected it, looking for mistakes in the animation or "things that didn't animate the way [the staff] intended". These problems were then fixed in Korea and the animation was finalized. From story outlining to broadcast, it took between eight and nine months for each episode to be created; because of this, multiple episodes were worked on concurrently.

While a great majority of the series' episodes were animated by Korean animation studios, Adventure Time occasionally featured guest animators and directors. For instance, the second-season episode "Guardians of Sunshine" was partly rendered in 3D to emulate the style of a video game. The fifth-season episode "A Glitch is a Glitch" was written and directed by Irish filmmaker and writer David OReilly and features his distinctive 3D animation. Animator James Baxter animated select scenes and characters in both the fifth-season episode "James Baxter the Horse" as well as the eighth-season episode "Horse & Ball". The sixth-season episode "Food Chain" was written, storyboarded, and directed by Japanese anime director Masaaki Yuasa, and animated entirely by Yuasa's studio Science Saru. Another sixth-season episode, "Water Park Prank", features Flash animation by David Ferguson. The stop-motion episode "Bad Jubies", directed by Kirsten Lepore, aired near the middle of the show's seventh season. Finally, Alex and Lindsay Small-Butera, noted for their web series Baman Piderman, contributed animation to the eighth-season episode "Beyond the Grotto" and the ninth-season episode "Ketchup".

==== Voice cast ====
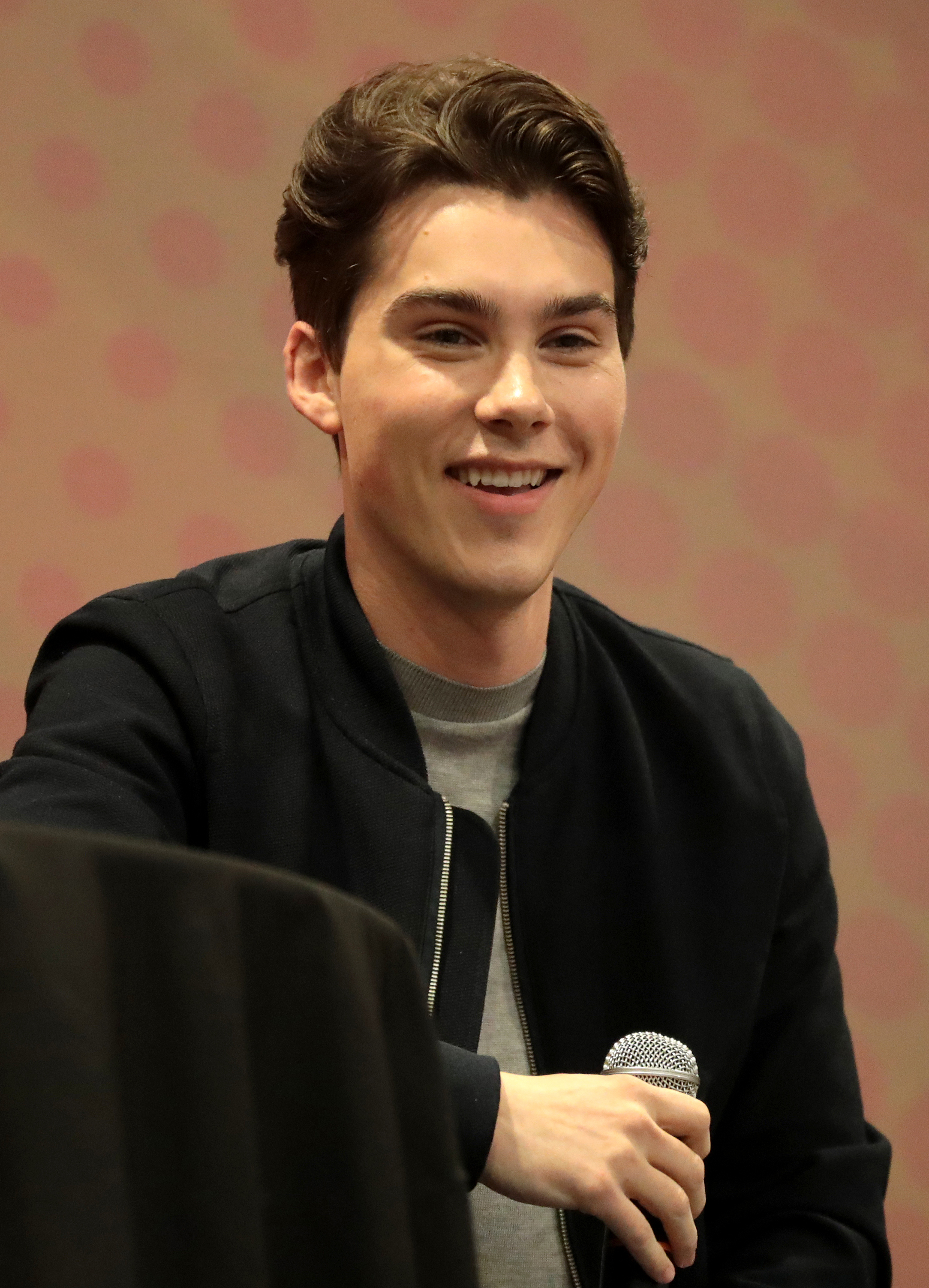
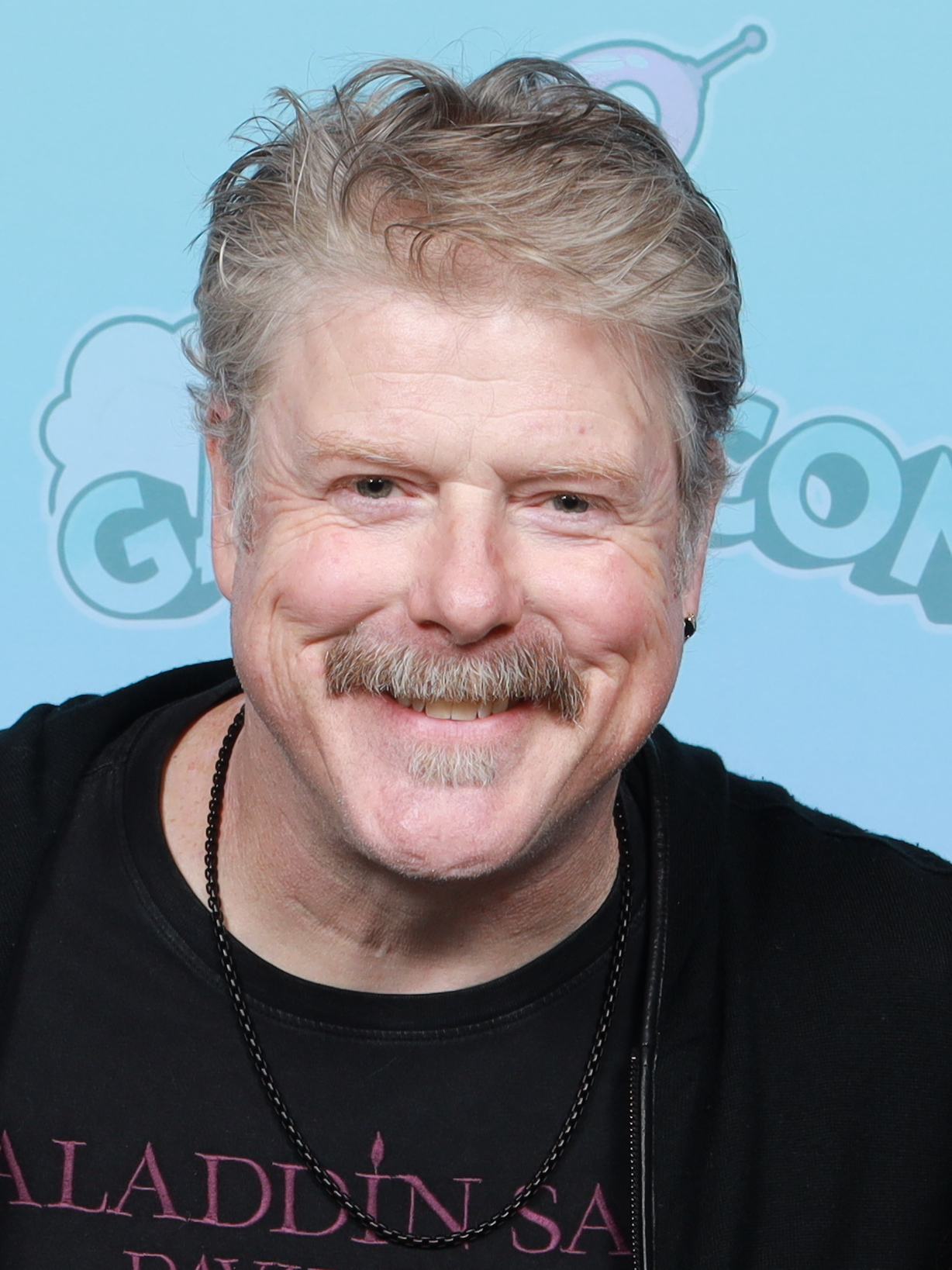
Jeremy Shada (left) and John DiMaggio (right) star in the series, voicing Finn and Jake, respectively.

The series' voice actors include Jeremy Shada (Finn the Human), John DiMaggio (Jake the Dog), Tom Kenny (Ice King), Hynden Walch (Princess Bubblegum), and Olivia Olson (Marceline the Vampire Queen). Ward voices Lumpy Space Princess and several minor characters. Former storyboard artist Niki Yang voices the sentient video game console BMO in English, as well as Jake's girlfriend Lady Rainicorn in Korean. Polly Lou Livingston, a friend of Ward's mother Bettie Ward, voices the small elephant Tree Trunks.

The show's cast members recorded their lines together at group recording sessions rather than individually, with the aim of recording natural-sounding dialogue. Walch described these group recordings as akin to "doing a play reading—a really, really out there play". The series regularly employed guest actors for minor and recurring characters, and crew members cast people with whom they were interested in working. For instance, in a panel, Muto and Kent Osborne said the Adventure Time crew often sought out actors who had had roles in the television programs Star Trek: The Next Generation and The Office to play various supporting or background characters.

==== Title sequence and music ====
Orchestral rendition of "Come Along with Me", the series' credits theme, in MultiVersus.

When Ward was developing the series' title sequences, the rough draft version consisted of quick shots and vignettes that were "just sort of crazy [and] nonsensical", which alluded to the show's theme of quirky adventures. These drafts included "the characters ... just punching random ghosts and monsters, jumping through anything and everything [and] there were a bunch of atomic bombs at the end of it". Ward later called this version "really silly". He sent the draft to Cartoon Network; they did not like it and wanted something more graphical like the introduction to The Brady Bunch. Inspired by the title sequences of The Simpsons and Pee-wee's Playhouse, Ward developed a new title sequence featuring a panning sweep of the Land of Ooo while a synthesizer note rose slowly until the main theme was played. Ward's draft for this idea was handed to layout animators, who then finalized the timing for the sequence. From there, the sequence evolved; while Ward added "silly character stuff", Patrick McHale focused his attention on the Ice King's shot and gave him a "high school [year]book" smile. The crew also struggled to get the shadows in the shot featuring Marceline correct. After the panning sweep, the sequence cuts to the theme song, which plays while shots of Finn and Jake adventuring are shown. For this part of the sequence, Ward was inspired by the "simple" aspects of the introduction to the 2007 comedy film Superbad. When the theme mentions "Jake the Dog" and "Finn the Human", the characters' names are displayed next to their heads, with a solid color in the background. The sequence was finalized immediately before the series aired.

The show's eponymous theme song is sung by Ward, accompanied by a ukulele. It is first heard in the pilot episode; in that version, Ward is accompanied by an acoustic guitar. For the version used in the series, Ward sang in a higher register to match the ukulele's range. The theme song's final version was originally supposed to be a temporary one. Ward said, "I recorded the lyrics for the opening title in the animatics room where we have this little crummy microphone just so that we could add it to the titles and submit it to the network. Later, we tried re-recording it and I didn't like it ... I only liked the temp one!" Because the series' finalized theme song was originally recorded as a temp track, ambient noises can be heard throughout. For instance, the sound of Derek Drymon typing can be heard while Jake is walking through the Ice Kingdom. According to Ward, much of the series' music has similar "hiss and grit" because one of the show's original composers, Casey James Basichis, "lives in a pirate ship he's built inside of an apartment [and] you can hear floorboards squeak and lots of other weird sounds". As the show progressed, Basichis's friend Tim Kiefer joined the show as an additional composer. The two eventually worked together on its music.

The show's title sequence and theme song have stayed mostly consistent throughout its run, with seven exceptions. During the episodes featuring Fionna Campbell and Cake the Cat (viz. season three's "Fionna and Cake", season five's "Bad Little Boy", season six's "The Prince Who Wanted Everything", season eight's "Five Short Tables", and season nine's "Fionna and Cake and Fionna") the series features a different intro sequence that mirrors the original, with the major exception that all the characters are gender-bent, and the theme is sung by former storyboard revisionist Natasha Allegri. Likewise, the intro to the series' three miniseries are each unique: the introduction to the Marceline-centric Stakes (2015) places most of the emphasis on Marceline, and the theme song is sung by Olson; the introduction to Islands (2017) adopts a nautical theme, highlights the principal characters in the miniseries, and is sung by Shada; and the intro to Elements (2017) features imagery reflecting the four primary elements in the Adventure Time universe (fire, ice, slime, and candy) and is sung by Hynden Walch. The introductions to the guest-animated episodes "A Glitch Is a Glitch" and "Food Chain" are each unique, featuring animation courtesy of OReilly and Yuasa, respectively. Finally, the series finale, "Come Along With Me", features an introduction offering viewers a glimpse of future Ooo, 1,000 years after Finn and Jake. This intro features the new characters Shermy and Beth and is sung by the latter (voiced by Willow Smith).

The series regularly features songs and musical numbers. Many of the cast members—including Shada, Kenny, and Olson—sing their characters' songs. Characters often express their emotions in song; examples of this include Marceline's song "I'm Just Your Problem" (from season three's "What Was Missing") and Finn's "All Gummed Up Inside" (from season three's "Incendium"). While the series' background music is composed by Basichis and Kiefer, the songs sung by characters are often written by the storyboard artists. And while it is a general rarity, the show also occasionally refers to popular music. Early during the show's run, Frederator, Seibert's production company, occasionally uploaded demos and full versions of songs sung by the characters to their official website, and when the production crew set up a series Tumblr account, this tradition of publishing demos and full versions of songs to the public was revived. On November 20, 2015, the label Spacelab9 released a limited-edition 12" LP featuring many of Marceline's songs, followed by a 38-song series soundtrack in October 2016.

==== Setting and mythology ====
The show is set in the fictional Land of Ooo, in a post-apocalyptic future about a thousand years after a nuclear holocaust called the "Great Mushroom War". According to Ward, the show takes place "after the bombs have fallen and magic has come back into the world". Before the series was fully developed, Ward intended the Land of Ooo to simply be "magical". After the production of the episode "Business Time", in which an iceberg containing reanimated businessmen floats to the surface of a lake, the show became explicitly post-apocalyptic; Ward said the production crew "just ran with it". Ward later described the setting as "candyland on the surface and dark underneath", noting he had never intended the Mushroom War and the post-apocalyptic elements to be "hit over the head in the show". He limited it to "cars buried underground in the background [and other elements that do not] raise any eyebrows". Ward has said the series' post-apocalyptic elements were influenced by the 1979 film Mad Max. Kenny called the way the elements are worked into the plot "very fill-in-the-blanks", and DiMaggio said, "it's been obvious the Land of Ooo has some issues".

The series has a canonical mythology—or, an overarching plot and backstory—that is expanded upon in various episodes. This mythology mainly involves the nature of the Mushroom War, the origin of the series' principal antagonist the Lich, and the backstories of several of the series' principal and recurring characters. Ward once noted that the details behind the Mushroom War and the series' dark mythology form "a story worth telling", but he also felt the show would be better off if the show "dance[d] around how heavy the back-history of Ooo is".

=== LGBTQ+ representation ===
After the September 2011 episode "What Was Missing" hinted at romantic subtext between Marceline and Bubblegum, fans began to "ship" the two, referring to the pairing as "Bubbline". Some reviewers also discussed the possible relationship, with Kjerstin Johnson of Bitch magazine expressing hope that that show's "queer cartoon subtext" would turn into "a queer cartoon subplot". Eventually, Bubblegum and Marceline's relationship was confirmed in the series finale, "Come Along With Me", which also featured the two characters kissing. While Bubblegum seems to have dated a male character named Mr. Cream Puff, her exact sexuality, unlike Marceline's, has not been confirmed. As such, reviewers have argued that she is either bisexual, non-binary, queer, lesbian, or a combination of some of the latter, as both live in a world where "sexuality is somewhat fluid."

Much of the series' LGBTQ+ representation was the result of storyboard artist Rebecca Sugar, who soon after joining the production crew "became more aware of what we're really saying by excluding [LGBTQ] characters" from children's TV—a situation which felt "more and more dire" to her. She thus began working hard to put "LGBTQIA characters in G-rated content" in the years to follow. Zeroing in on the relationship between Marceline and Bubblegum, Sugar tried to foster their relationship. In a March 2021 Vanity Fair interview, Sugar said that she was encouraged by the "creative team to put their own life experiences into the character of Marceline," but when this led to a "romantic storyline between Marceline and Princess Bubblegum", Cartoon Network executives intervened. This moment led Sugar and the rest of the show's team to see the limit of what they could accomplish, in terms of representation. The writers initially responded to this roadblock by working queer themes into episodes as subtext to avoid controversy or network censorship, but later episodes would openly expand on these themes, bringing them to the forefront of the series' plot.

=== Finale ===
During the last seasons of Adventure Time, there was discussion at Cartoon Network about concluding the series. Olivia Olson, who provided the voice of Marceline, said that since this discussion wore on for a while, "the ending of the show was getting stretched and stretched and stretched". Chief content officer Rob Sorcher told the Los Angeles Times of the network's decision to end the series, saying:

Adventure Time was playing less and less on Cartoon Network, yet we were moving towards a large volume of episodes. And I really began thinking "[The end] can't come quickly as a sudden company decision, it needs to be a conversation over a period of time." And it did also strike me that if we don't wind this up soon, we're going to have a generation of fans graduate through the [television] demo [graphic that Cartoon Network targets] and we won't have completed a thought for them.

Consequently, on September 29, 2016, Cartoon Network confirmed that the series would conclude after its tenth season. The final episode of the series was a special, titled "Come Along with Me"; the special was written and storyboarded by Tom Herpich, Steve Wolfhard, Seo Kim, Somvilay Xayaphone, Hanna K. Nyström, Aleks Sennwald, Sam Alden, and Graham Falk. The story was developed by Herpich, Wolfhard, Ashly Burch, showrunner Adam Muto, head writer Kent Osborne, Jack Pendarvis, Julia Pott, and series creator Pendleton Ward. Former head background designer Ghostshrimp returned after having officially left the series during the fourth season.

According to Osborne, Cartoon Network provided the writers with "an opportunity to spend a lot of time thinking about the finale" before production ended. In an interview with TV Guide, Muto explained that the show's writers used many of the episodes preceding the finale to conclude minor character story arcs "so we wouldn't have to cram too much in at the very end here." This allowed the finale itself to be "less dense" by simply "hitting the big [beats] and then finding vignettes for all the characters ... so we could get snapshots of where they could end up." According to Pendarvis, storyline writing for the series ended in mid-November 2016, with the last storyline meeting held on November 21. A tweet by Osborne revealed that the series' final script was pitched to storyboarders, with Alden and Nyström in attendance, on November 28. This episode was then pitched to the show's producers during the third week of December 2016. Voice recording for the episode ended on January 31, 2017, as confirmed by a number of cast members, including Maria Bamford and Andy Milonakis. The series finale aired on September 3, 2018 to universal acclaim.

== Broadcast and ratings ==
=== Episodes ===
Each Adventure Time episode is about eleven minutes in length; pairs of episodes are often telecast in order to fill a half-hour program time slot. Before the official debut of the first season, Cartoon Network aired both "Business Time" and "Evicted!" on March 11 and 18, respectively, advertising these showings as "previews" of the series-to-come. The show officially debuted with "Slumber Party Panic" on April 5, 2010.

During the latter part of its run, the show began to experiment with the miniseries format. The first of these was Stakes (2015), which aired during the show's seventh season. The following miniseries, Islands (2017) aired as part of the eighth season. The third and final miniseries, Elements (2017), aired during the show's ninth season.

The show's seventh season was originally intended to comprise 39 episodes, ranging from "Bonnie & Neddy" to "Reboot". However, when it came time to upload the season onto streaming sites like CartoonNetwork.com, Cartoon Network chose to end the season with the episode "The Thin Yellow Line", for a total of 26 episodes. This new episode count for the season was cemented by the release of the complete seventh season DVD on July 18, 2017, which included episodes "Bonnie & Neddy" through "The Thin Yellow Line". As such, the episode and season number sequence is accordingly changed, as follows:

Production numbering vs. season divisions
| Production Sequence | Season 7 | | | | | | | | | | | | | | | | | | | | | | | | | | | | | | | | | | | | | | | Season 8 | | | | | | | | | | | | | | | | | | | | | | | | | | | | Season 9 | | | | | | | | | | | | | | | |
| Production Sequence | 1 | 2 | 3 | 4 | 5 | 6 | 7 | 8 | 9 | 10 | 11 | 12 | 13 | 14 | 15 | 16 | 17 | 18 | 19 | 20 | 21 | 22 | 23 | 24 | 25 | 26 | 27 | 28 | 29 | 30 | 31 | 32 | 33 | 34 | 35 | 36 | 37 | 38 | 39 | 1 | 2 | 3 | 4 | 5 | 6 | 7 | 8 | 9 | 10 | 11 | 12 | 13 | 14 | 15 | 16 | 17 | 18 | 19 | 20 | 21 | 22 | 23 | 24 | 25 | 26 | 27 | 28 | 1 | 2 | 3 | 4 | 5 | 6 | 7 | 8 | 9 | 10 | 11 | 12 | 13 | 14 | 15 | 16 |
| Current Sequence | Season 7 | | | | | | | | | | | | | | | | | | | | | | | | | | Season 8 | | | | | | | | | | | | | | | | | | | | | | | | | | | Season 9 | | | | | | | | | | | | | | Season 10 | | | | | | | | | | | | | | | |
| Current Sequence | 1 | 2 | 3 | 4 | 5 | 6 | 7 | 8 | 9 | 10 | 11 | 12 | 13 | 14 | 15 | 16 | 17 | 18 | 19 | 20 | 21 | 22 | 23 | 24 | 25 | 26 | 1 | 2 | 3 | 4 | 5 | 6 | 7 | 8 | 9 | 10 | 11 | 12 | 13 | 14 | 15 | 16 | 17 | 18 | 19 | 20 | 21 | 22 | 23 | 24 | 25 | 26 | 27 | 1 | 2 | 3 | 4 | 5 | 6 | 7 | 8 | 9 | 10 | 11 | 12 | 13 | 14 | 1 | 2 | 3 | 4 | 5 | 6 | 7 | 8 | 9 | 10 | 11 | 12 | 13 | 14 | 15 | 16 |

For its first six seasons, episodes regularly aired once a week. Starting in November 2014, the show began to air new episodes via "bombs", or weeks in which new episodes debuted every day. This change in airing style disrupted the viewing patterns of some fans, as Dave Trumbore of Collider explained: "Back when [the show] was regularly airing in a more traditional schedule, it was a little easier to keep track of the completely insane episodes full of half-explained mythology and lots and lots of non-sequiturs. During the last few seasons, however, [when] the episodes started to arrive in more of a scattershot fashion scheduled around multi-part specials [it became easier to miss] the random airings of certain episodes".

The series' initial run concluded in 2018, after the airing of its tenth season. Reruns have aired on Boomerang and Adult Swim.

=== Ratings ===
Upon its debut, Adventure Time was a ratings success for Cartoon Network. In March 2013, it was reported that the show averaged roughly 2 to 3 million viewers an episode. According to a 2012 report by Nielsen, the show consistently ranked first in its time slot among boys aged 2–14. The show premiered on April 5, 2010, and was watched by 2.5 million viewers. The pilot episode was a ratings success. According to a press release by Cartoon Network, the episode's time slot saw triple-digit percentage increases from the previous year. The program was viewed by 1.661 million children aged 2–11, which marked a 110% increase from the previous year's figures. It was watched by 837,000 children aged 9–14, a 239% increase from the previous year's figures.

Between the second and sixth seasons, the show's ratings continued to grow; the second-season premiere was watched by 2.001 million viewers, the third-season premiere by 2.686 million, the fourth-season premiere by 2.655 million, the fifth-season premiere by 3.435 million, and the sixth-season premiere by 3.321 million. The show's seventh-season opener took a substantial ratings tumble, being watched by only 1.07 million viewers. Likewise, the eighth-, ninth-, and tenth-season premieres were watched by only 1.13, 0.71, and 0.77 million viewers, respectively. The series finale, "Come Along with Me", was viewed by 0.92 million viewers and scored a 0.25 Nielsen rating in the 18- to 49-year-old demographic, which means the episode was seen by 0.25 percent of all individuals aged 18 to 49 years old who were watching television at the time of the episode's airing.

=== Home media and streaming service ===
On September 27, 2011, Cartoon Network released the region 1 DVD My Two Favorite People, which features a selection of twelve episodes from the series' first two seasons. Following this, several other region-1 compilation DVDs have been released, including: It Came from the Nightosphere (2012), Jake vs. Me-Mow (2012), Fionna and Cake (2013), Jake the Dad (2013), The Suitor (2014), Princess Day (2014), Adventure Time and Friends (2014), Finn the Human (2014), Frost & Fire (2015), The Enchiridion (2015), Stakes (2016), Card Wars (2016), and Islands (2017). All of the seasons have been released on DVD, and the first six have been released domestically on Blu-ray. A box set containing the entire series was released on DVD on April 30, 2019.

On March 30, 2013, the first season of Adventure Time was made available on the Netflix Instant Watch service for online streaming; the second season was made available on March 30, 2014. Both seasons were removed from Netflix on March 30, 2015. The series was made available for streaming via Hulu on May 1, 2015.

While in the United States, HBO Max becomes the primary platform to watch Adventure Time: Distant Lands, there are debuts of "BMO", the first special of the spin-off series, in different countries and regions in respective Cartoon Network channels worldwide, on different dates mainly in 2020; such as October 24 (Turkey), October 25 (France), November 21 (the United Kingdom), December 12 (Germany, Australia, and Taiwan), and December 27 (Russia). In South Korea, the debut was on January 1, 2021.

== Reception ==
=== Critical reception ===
Adventure Time makes me wish I were a kid again, just so I could grow up to be as awesome as the kids who are currently watching Adventure Time will be.

— Entertainment Weekly staff.

Adventure Time received widespread critical acclaim. The A.V. Club reviewer Zack Handlen called it "a terrific show [that] fits beautifully in that gray area between kid and adult entertainment in a way that manages to satisfy both a desire for sophisticated (i.e., weird) writing and plain old silliness".

The show has been praised for its resemblance to cartoons of the past. In an article for the Los Angeles Times, television critic Robert Lloyd compared the series to "the sort of cartoons they made when cartoons themselves were young and delighted in bringing all things to rubbery life". Robert Mclaughlin of Den of Geek expressed a similar sentiment when he wrote that Adventure Time "is the first cartoon in a long time that is pure imagination". He complimented the show for "its non-reliance on continually referencing pop culture". Eric Kohn of IndieWire said the show "represents the progress of [cartoon] medium" in the current decade.

A number of reviews have positively compared the series and its creators to other culturally significant works and individuals, respectively. In 2013, Entertainment Weekly reviewer Darren Franich called the series "a hybrid sci-fi/fantasy/horror/musical/fairy tale, with echoes of Calvin and Hobbes, Hayao Miyazaki, Final Fantasy, Richard Linklater, Where the Wild Things Are, and the music video you made with your high school garage band". Emily Nussbaum of The New Yorker praised Adventure Time's unique approach to emotion, humor, and philosophy by likening it to "World of Warcraft as recapped by Carl Jung". Zack Handlen of The A.V. Club concluded that the show was "basically what would happen if you asked a bunch of 12-year-olds to make a cartoon, only it's the best possible version of that, like if all the 12-year-olds were super geniuses and some of them were Stan Lee and Jack Kirby and the Marx Brothers".

Adventure Time's willingness to explore dark, depressing, and complex issues has received praise. Kohn applauded the fact that the show "toys with an incredibly sad subtext". Novelist Lev Grossman, in an interview with NPR, praised the backstory of the Ice King and the exploration of his condition in the third-season episode "Holly Jolly Secrets", the fourth-season episode "I Remember You", and the fifth-season episode "Simon & Marcy", noting that his origin is "psychologically plausible". Grossman praised the way the series was able to tackle issues of mental illness, saying: "It's very affecting. My dad has been going through having Alzheimer's, and he's forgotten so much about who he used to be. And I look at him and think this cartoon is about my father dying". Critics have suggested that the show has grown and matured as it has aged. In a review of season four, for instance, Mike LeChevallier of Slant magazine complimented the show for "growing up" with its characters. He concluded that the series has "strikingly few faults" and awarded the fourth season three-and-a-half stars out of four.

The series has been included on a number of best-of lists. Entertainment Weekly awarded it second place in its 2012 list of the "10 Best Cartoon Network Shows" and ranked it number 20 (out of 25) in a list of the "Greatest Animated TV Series". Similarly, The A.V. Club, in a non-ranked run-down of the "best animated series ever", called the series "one of the most distinctive cartoons currently on the air".

The show has also received some minor criticism from reviewers. LeChevallier, in an otherwise largely positive review of the third season for Slant magazine, wrote that "the short-form format leaves some emotional substance to be desired", and that this was inevitable for a series with such short episodes. The independent cartoon scholar and critic David Perlmutter, who otherwise applauded the show's voice acting and its ability to surpass its source material, argued that the show's vacillation between high and low comedy epitomizes the fact that Cartoon Network is "unsure of what direction to pursue". He noted that "while some of [Adventure Time's] episodes work well, others [are] simply confusing". The newspaper Metro cited the show's frightening situations, occasional adult themes, and use of innuendo as reasons why parents might not want their young children watching it.

=== Industry impact ===
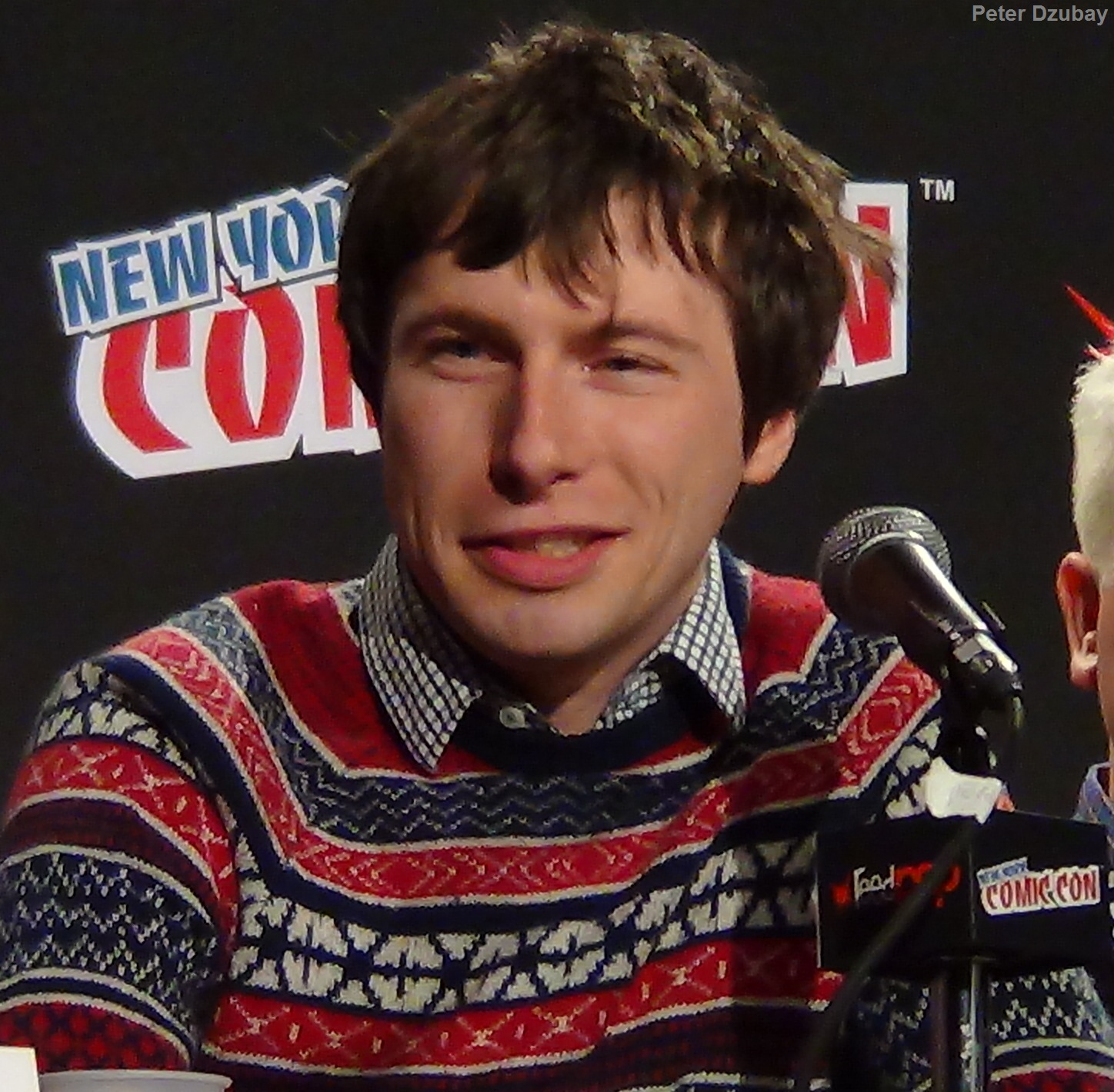
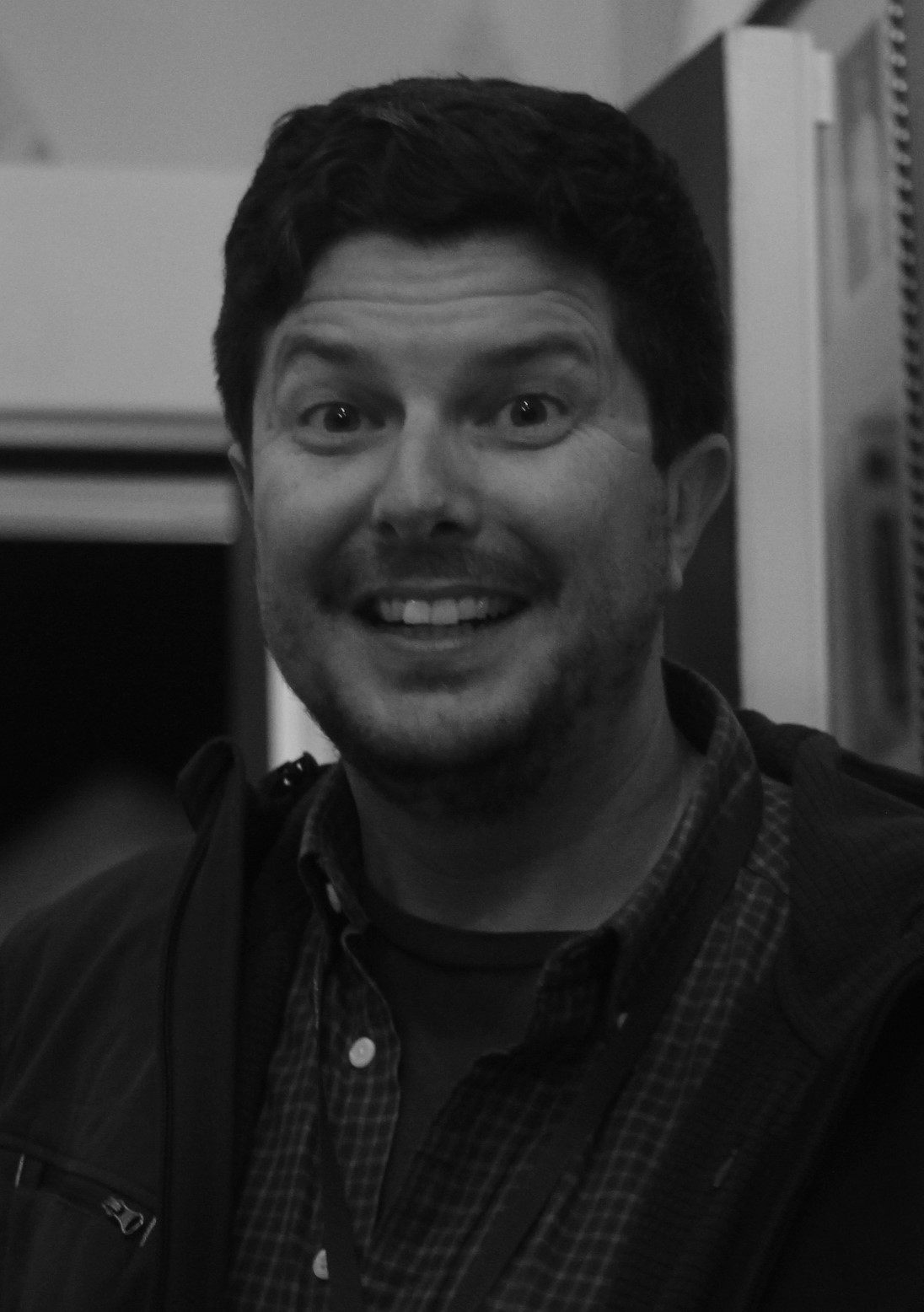
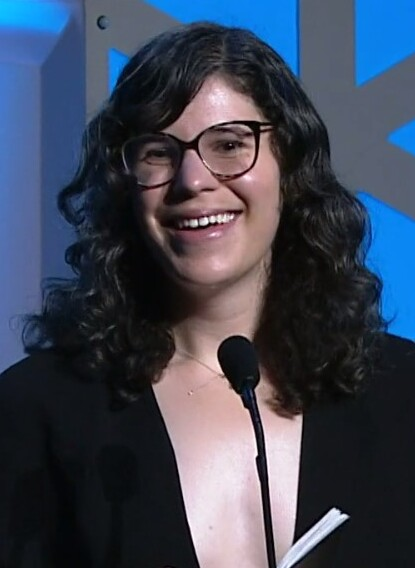
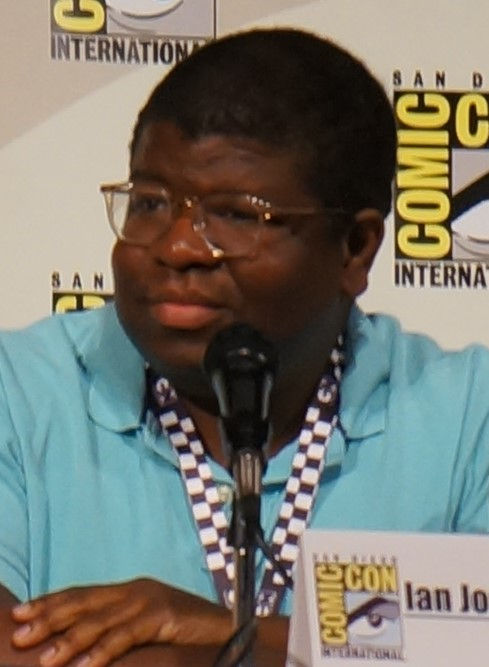
Some of the notable animators who worked on Adventure Time, listed here from left to right:
(Top Row) Patrick McHale, Kent Osborne
(Bottom Row) Rebecca Sugar and Ian Jones-Quartey.

Several former crew members who worked on Adventure Time have gone on to create their own series, including Patrick McHale (a former storyline writer, storyboard artist, and creative director who went on to create Over the Garden Wall), J.G. Quintel (a former storyboard artist who went on to create Regular Show and Close Enough), Pete Browngardt (a former storyboard artist who went on to create Secret Mountain Fort Awesome, Uncle Grandpa, and Looney Tunes Cartoons), Rebecca Sugar (a former storyboard artist who went on to create Steven Universe), Ian Jones-Quartey (a former storyboard revisionist and supervisor who went on to create OK K.O.! Let's Be Heroes), Skyler Page (a former storyboard artist who went on to create Clarence), Julia Pott (a former storyline writer who went on to create Summer Camp Island), Kent Osborne (the show's former head story writer who went on to create Cat Agent), and Elizabeth Ito (a former storyboard artist and supervising director who created City of Ghosts for Netflix).

Heidi MacDonald of Slate argued that the scouting of indie comic creators employed by Adventure Time (as well as several other Cartoon Network and Nickelodeon series) has led to an "animation gold rush" in which major studios are actively seeking under-the-radar talent for their shows, with her article surmising that "your favorite brilliant indie cartoonist is probably storyboarding for Adventure Time". MacDonald also pointed out that Adventure Time has influenced the tone of modern comics, noting:

If anything, walking around [comic] shows like SPX, I've noticed something of an Adventure Time track among many of the small press comics now coming out: Where once young cartoonists overwhelmingly produced gloomy masculine self-absorption and misanthropy in the tradition of Daniel Clowes or Chris Ware, these days many booths feature fantasy epics with colorful characters and invented worlds heavy on the talking animals. It shouldn't be surprising that up-and-coming cartoonists are absorbing the Adventure Time aesthetic. A 20-year-old making comics now could have been watching the show since she was 15, after all.

In an interview with Paste magazine, Sugar explained that working on Adventure Time and connecting with indie and underground comic artists who worked on the show (like Ward, McHale and Muto) was a creative game-changer, as they told her to do what she would do when drawing comics and to not hold anything back. She argued that many of the recent developments in animation were inspired by what the show was able to do by being "very artist-driven" and allowing independent comic artists to have a major say in the direction of episodes.

=== Academic interest ===
Adventure Time has attracted academic interest for its presentation of gender and gender roles. Emma A. Jane, an academic from the University of New South Wales in Sydney, Australia, wrote that while the two main characters are male and many episodes involve them engaging in violent acts to save princesses, "Finn and Jake are [nevertheless] part of an expansive ensemble cast of characters who are anything but stereotypical and who populate a program which subverts many traditional gender-related paradigms". She said the show features "roughly equal numbers of female and male characters in a protagonist, antagonist, and minor roles"; includes characters with no fixed gender; uses "gendered 'design elements'" such as eyelashes and hair to illustrate character traits rather than gender; equally distributes traits regardless of gender; privileges found, adoptive families or extended families; frames gender in ways that suggest it is fluid, and features elements of queer and transgender subtext. Carolyn Leslie, writing in Screen, agrees, saying, "despite having two male leads, Adventure Time is particularly strong when it comes to questioning and challenging gender stereotypes". She cited Princess Bubblegum, BMO, and Fionna and Cake as examples of characters who refuse to be readily categorized and genderized.

The first non-fiction book to scholarly study the series was Adventure Time and Philosophy (2015), edited by Nicolas Michaud. Published by Open Court Publishing Company, this work considers Adventure Time from a variety of angles, using the show as a way to explore different philosophical angles and ideas. In July 2020, independent scholar Paul A. Thomas released a book entitled Exploring the Land of Ooo that documented the show's production history; an expanded and updated version of the book was released in 2023 by the University Press of Mississippi.

=== Fandom ===
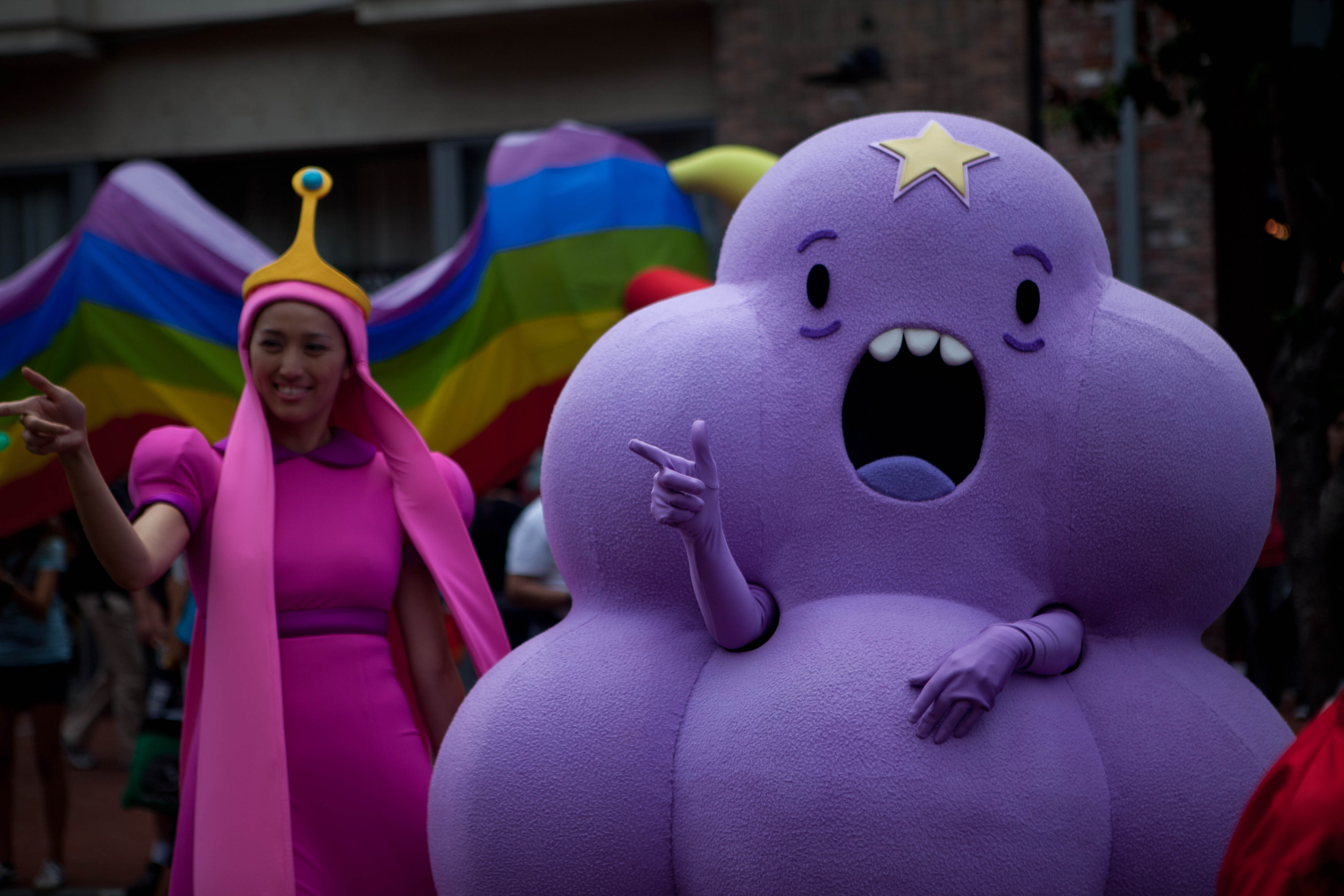
Adventure Time fans cosplaying as Princess Bubblegum (left) and Lumpy Space Princess (right).

Since its debut, Adventure Time has developed a strong following among children, teenagers, and adults; according to A.V. Club critic Noel Murray, fans are drawn to Adventure Time because of "the show's silly humor, imaginative stories, and richly populated world". While the show is often described as having a cult following, Eric Kohn of IndieWire said that the series has "started to look like one of the biggest television phenomenons of the decade". According to Alex Heigl of People magazine, "The show's fandom is especially Internet-savvy as well, with huge communities on Reddit, Imgur and Tumblr, who swap GIFs, fan art and theories with fervent regularity". In 2016, a study by The New York Times of the 50 TV shows with the most Facebook Likes found that Adventure Time "is the most popular show among the young in our data—just over two-thirds of 'likes' come from viewers [aged] 18–24".

The show is a popular presence at fan conventions, such as San Diego Comic-Con. Reporter Emma-Lee Moss said, "This year's [2014] Comic-Con schedule reflected Adventure Time's growing success, with several screenings [as well as] a dramatic reading with the show's voice talent". The show is also popular with cosplayers, who are performance artists that wear costumes and fashion accessories to represent characters from any given series. Moss wrote, "Looking into the crowd, it was clear that [Finn's] distinctive blue shirt and white hat were being mirrored by hundreds of Cosplayers, male and female". In an interview, Olivia Olson (who voices the character Marceline) said, "Literally, anywhere you look, anywhere in your range, you're going to see at least two people dressed up like Finn. It's crazy".

== Related media ==
=== Spin-offs ===
On October 23, 2019, Cartoon Network announced that four hour-long specials—collectively titled Adventure Time: Distant Lands—would air on HBO Max. The specials aired in 2020 and 2021. On August 17, 2021, it was announced that a second spin-off, Adventure Time: Fionna and Cake, focusing on the gender-swapped Fionna and Cake characters, had been ordered by HBO Max. On June 12, 2024, it was revealed that two additional spin-offs, entitled Adventure Time: Side Quests and Adventure Time: Heyo BMO, had also been greenlit by Cartoon Network Studios. Another spin-off Adventure Time: Bubblegum and Marceline was greenlit two years later. Adventure Time: Side Quests was released on Hulu and Disney+ on June 29, 2026.

=== Comic books ===
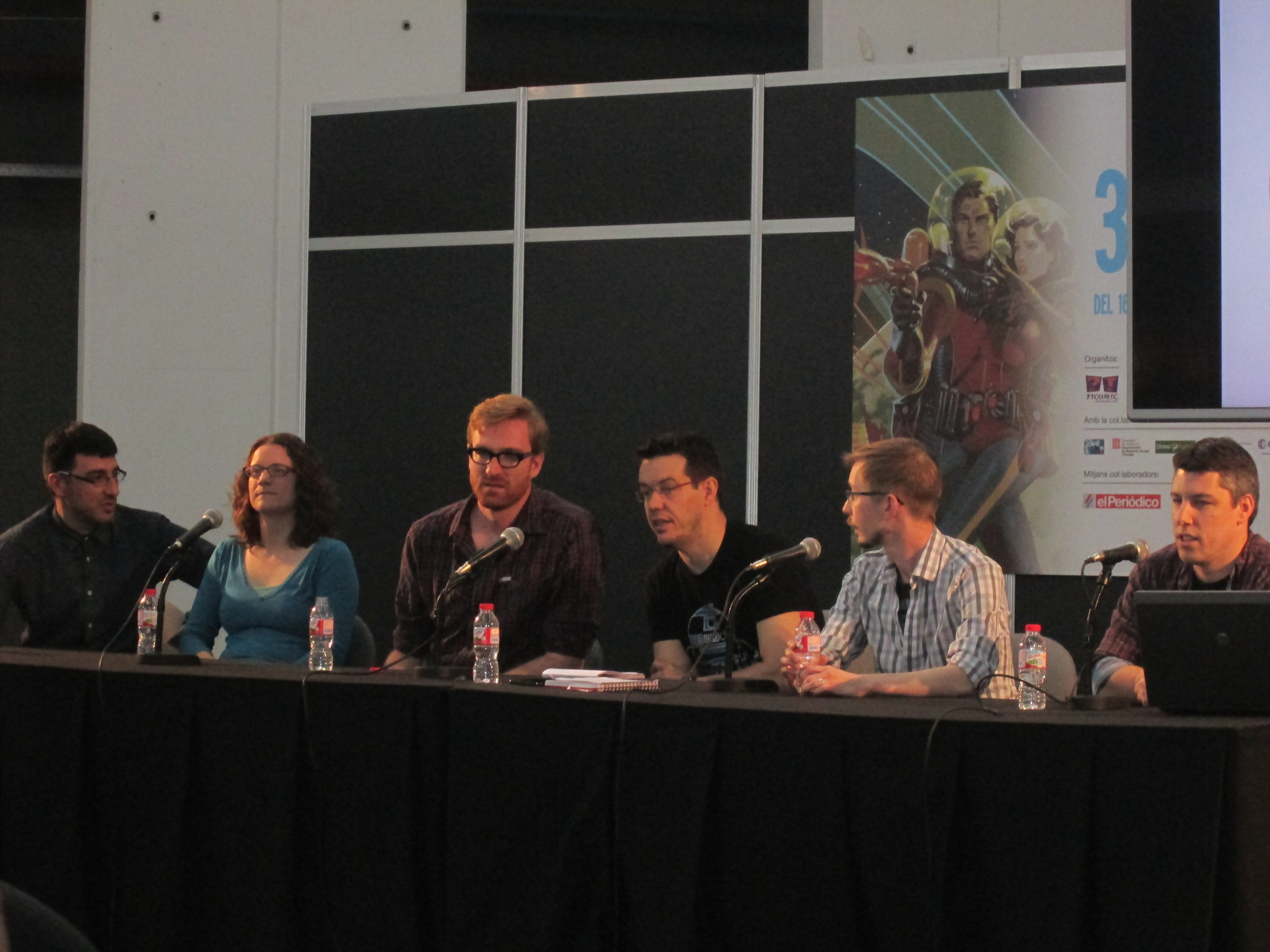
Ryan North (third from the left) along with other Adventure Time comics crew in 2015

On November 19, 2011, KaBoom! Studios announced plans for an Adventure Time comic book series written by independent webcomic creator Ryan North, who wrote the series Dinosaur Comics. The series launched on February 8, 2012, with art by Shelli Paroline and Braden Lamb. In October 2014, it was revealed that North had left the comic series after three years. His duties were assumed by Christopher Hastings, the creator of The Adventures of Dr. McNinja. This comic book line ended in April 2018 with its seventy-fifth issue, which North returned to co-write.

In 2025, Oni Press launched a new monthly Adventure Time series. On October 1, 2025, the Adventure Time: Bubbline College Special one-shot comic book was released, written by Caroline Cash.

After the success of the original 2012 comic book line, several spin-off mini-series were launched. Some of the comic series are as follows:

| Title | Story by | Release date | End date | No. of issues | Ref. |
|---|---|---|---|---|---|
| Adventure Time: Marceline and the Scream Queens | Meredith Gran | July 11, 2012 | December 12, 2012 | 6 | |
| Adventure Time with Fionna & Cake | Natasha Allegri | January 2, 2013 | June 3, 2013 | 6 | |
| Candy Capers | Ananth Panagariya; Yuko Ota | July 10, 2013 | December 11, 2013 | 6 | |
| Flip Side | Colleen Coover; Paul Tobin | January 8, 2014 | June 4, 2014 | 6 | |
| Banana Guard Academy | Kent Osborne | July 9, 2014 | December 7, 2014 | 6 | |
| Adventure Time: Marceline Gone Adrift | Meredith Gran | January 14, 2015 | June 10, 2015 | 6 | |
| Adventure Time with Fionna and Cake: Card Wars | Jen Wang | July 15, 2015 | December 16, 2015 | 6 | |
| Adventure Time: Ice King | Emily Partridge | January 20, 2016 | June 15, 2016 | 6 | |
| Adventure Time/Regular Show | Conor McCreery | August 2, 2017 | January 10, 2018 | 6 | |
| Adventure Time Season 11 | Ted Anderson | October 24, 2018 | March 27, 2019 | 6 (Note: There were 12 issues in total planned, but the project was cancelled after the release of the sixth issue. Note that while the plot to these comics are billed as being "season 11", no one from the original Adventure Time production crew was involved, making them non-canonical with respect to the television series.) | |
| Adventure Time: Marcy & Simon | Olivia Olson | January 16, 2019 | June 19, 2019 | 6 | |

A separate line of comics officially denoted as graphic novels, have also been released. Books in this line are:

| Title | Story by | Release date | Ref. |
|---|---|---|---|
| Playing with Fire | Danielle Corsetto | July 11, 2012 | |
| Pixel Princesses | Danielle Corsetto | November 6, 2013 | |
| Seeing Red | Kate Leth | March 5, 2014 | |
| Bitter Sweets | Kate Leth | November 5, 2014 | |
| Graybles Schmaybles | Danielle Corsetto | April 1, 2015 | |
| Masked Mayhem | Kate Leth; Meredith McClaren | November 11, 2015 | |
| The Four Castles | Josh Trujillo | May 4, 2016 | |
| President Bubblegum | Josh Trujillo | September 27, 2016 | |
| Brain Robbers | Josh Trujillo | March 27, 2017 | |
| The Ooorient Express | Jeremy Sorese | July 18, 2017 | |
| Princess & Princess | Jeremy Sorese | January 24, 2018 | |
| Thunder Road | Jeremy Sorese | June 13, 2018 | |
| Marceline the Pirate Queen | Leah Williams | February 26, 2019 | |

=== Other literature ===
Other Adventure Time-themed books have also been released. The Adventure Time Encyclopaedia, published on July 22, 2013, was written by comedian Martin Olson, father of Olivia Olson and the voice of recurring character Hunson Abadeer. This was followed by Adventure Time: The Enchiridion & Marcy's Super Secret Scrapbook!!!, which was released on October 6, 2015. Written by Martin and Olivia Olson, it is presented as a combination of the Enchiridion and Marceline's secret diary. An official Art of ... book, titled The Art of Ooo was published on October 14, 2014. It contains interviews with cast and crew members and opens with an introduction by filmmaker Guillermo del Toro. Two volumes with collections of the show's title cards have also been released, as has a cookbook with recipes inspired by the show, and a series of prose novels published under the header "Epic Tales from Adventure Time" (which includes The Untamed Scoundrel, Queen of Rogues, The Lonesome Outlaw, and The Virtue of Ardor, all of which were published under the pseudonym "T. T. MacDangereuse").

=== Video games ===
The series has spawned several major video game releases. The first game based on the series, Adventure Time: Hey Ice King! Why'd You Steal Our Garbage?!!, was announced by Pendleton Ward on his Twitter account in March 2012. The game was developed by WayForward Technologies for Nintendo DS and Nintendo 3DS, and was released by D3 Publisher on November 20, 2012. A year later, the game Adventure Time: Explore the Dungeon Because I Don't Know!, which follows Finn and Jake as they strive "to save the Candy Kingdom by exploring the mysterious Secret Royal Dungeon deep below the Land of Ooo", was released in November 2013. On November 18, 2014, Adventure Time: The Secret of the Nameless Kingdom was released for Nintendo 3DS, Xbox 360, PlayStation 3, PlayStation Vita, and Microsoft Windows. In October 2015, the fourth major Adventure Time video game, titled Finn & Jake Investigations, was released for 3DS, Windows and other consoles. It is the first in the series to feature full 3D graphics. Another game, Adventure Time: Pirates of the Enchiridion, was released for the PlayStation 4, Nintendo Switch, Windows, and Xbox One in July 2018. The game was published by Outright Games, developed by Climax Studios, and features the show's original cast. That game won the award for "Performance in a Comedy, Lead" with John DiMaggio at the National Academy of Video Game Trade Reviewers Awards, in which Jeremy Shada was also nominated for the same category.

Various other minor video games have also been released. Several, including Legends of Ooo, Fionna Fights, Beemo – Adventure Time, and Ski Safari: Adventure Time, have been released on the iOS App Store. A game titled Finn & Jake's Quest was released on April 11, 2014, on Steam. Cartoon Network also released a multiplayer online battle arena (MOBA) game titled Adventure Time: Battle Party on Cartoon Network's official site, on June 23, 2014. In April 2015, two downloadable content packs for LittleBigPlanet 3 on PlayStation 3 and PlayStation 4 were released; one contained Adventure Time costumes, while the other contained a level kit with decorations, stickers, music, objects, a background, and a bonus Fionna costume. A virtual reality (VR) game entitled Adventure Time: Magic Man's Head Games was also released to Oculus Rift, HTC Vive, and PlayStation VR. A second VR game, entitled Adventure Time: I See Ooo, was released on September 29, 2016. In that same month, Adventure Time characters were added to the Lego Dimensions game. Finn and Jake became playable characters in the video game Cartoon Network: Battle Crashers which was released for the Nintendo 3DS, PlayStation 4, Xbox One on November 8, 2016 and the Nintendo Switch on October 31, 2017. Finn, Jake, Banana Guard, and Marceline are playable characters in the platform fighter MultiVersus.

=== Film ===
In February 2015, it was reported that a theatrical Adventure Time film was being developed by Cartoon Network Studios, Frederator Films, Vertigo Entertainment, and Warner Animation Group. According to reports, the film would be executive-produced and written by Pendleton Ward, and produced by Roy Lee and Chris McKay. In October 2015, series producer Adam Muto confirmed that series creator Pendleton Ward was "working on the premise" for the film, but that there was "nothing official to announce yet". On July 22, 2018, Muto noted that "an [Adventure Time] movie was never officially announced". On August 31, 2018, Muto said the finale of the show would not affect a potential movie, nor would the finale lead directly into a film. He also noted that "all the lore and stuff would not work for a first time viewer", suggesting that the film would have to hold well on its own to be successful.

However, on June 12, 2024, during the Annecy Animation Festival, it was announced that an Adventure Time movie was in development, with Rebecca Sugar, Adam Muto, and Patrick McHale all involved in the project.

=== Other appearances ===
A variety of officially licensed merchandise—including action figures, role-playing toys, bedding, dishware, and various other products—have been released. Since the dramatic increase in popularity of the series, many graphic T-shirts have been officially licensed through popular clothing retailers. Pendleton Ward hosted T-shirt designing contests on the websites of both We Love Fine and Threadless. Other shirts can be purchased directly from Cartoon Network's store. A collectible card game called Card Wars, inspired by the fourth-season episode of the same name, has also been released. On March 11, 2016, it was announced by Lego via Lego Ideas that an official Adventure Time Lego set from an idea by site user, aBetterMonkey, had met voting qualifications and was approved to be produced in cooperation with Cartoon Network. The set was released in January 2017.

On July 21, 2013, Taiwan High Speed Rail and the Taiwan branch of Cartoon Network worked together on a project called "Cartoon Express" (歡樂卡通列車). The entire train was covered with characters from various Cartoon Network shows (including The Amazing World of Gumball, The Powerpuff Girls, Ben 10, and Regular Show), and the two sides of the train is painted with Finn and Jake respectively. Throughout the project, there were over 1,400 runs of the train and over 1.3 million passengers were transported. Near the end, the Taiwan High Speed Rail also sold postcards as souvenirs for sale since August 23, 2014, and the project eventually ended on September 9, 2014. In addition, Cartoon Network established a waterpark named Cartoon Network Amazone in Chonburi, Thailand; it opened on October 3, 2014. Promoting the waterpark, Thai Smile painted Finn, Jake, Princess Bubblegum and Marceline on the planes.

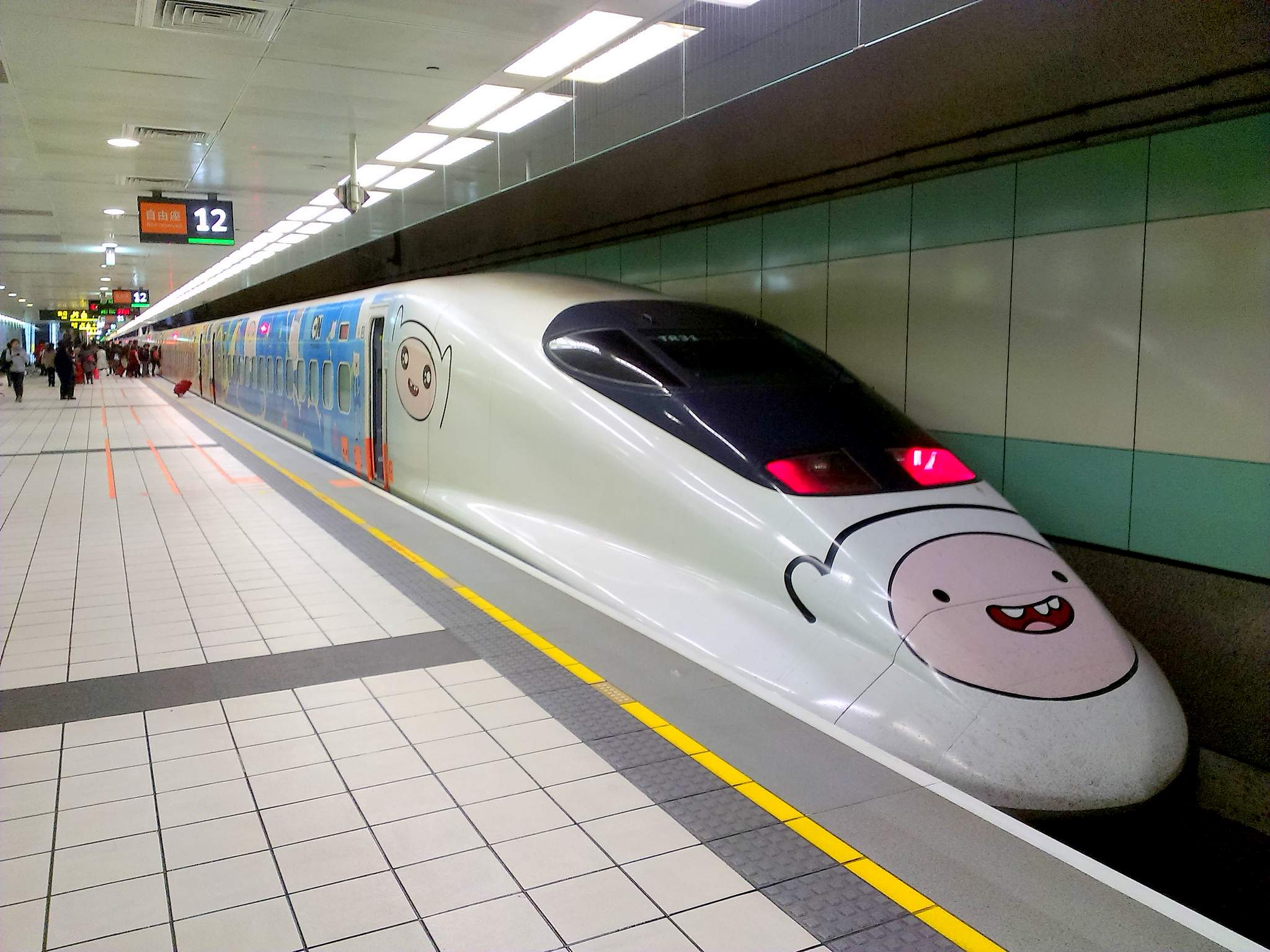
The Finn train as seen in Taoyuan HSR station, Taiwan (2014)

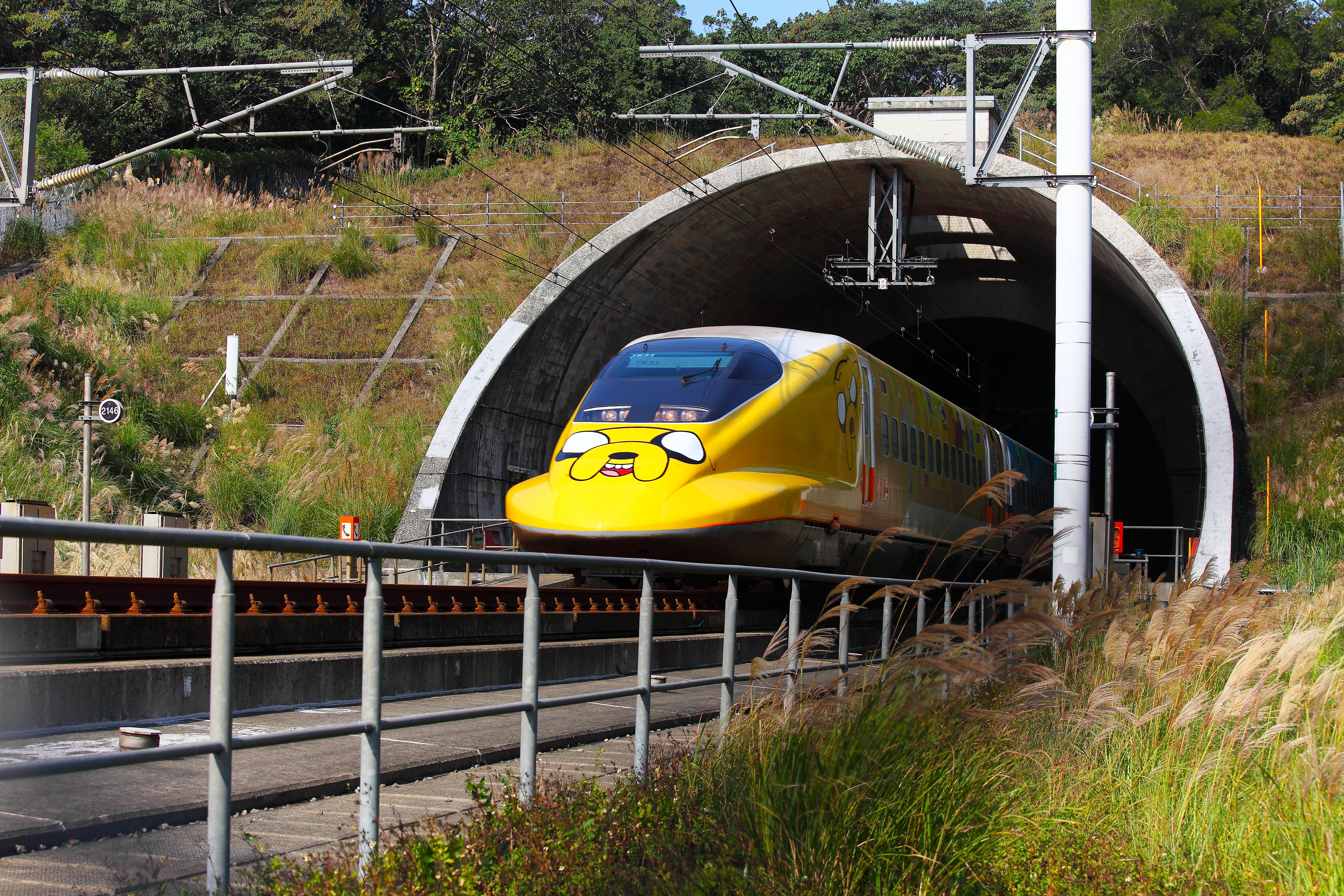
The Jake train as seen from Xinpu, Hsinchu near the railway (2013)

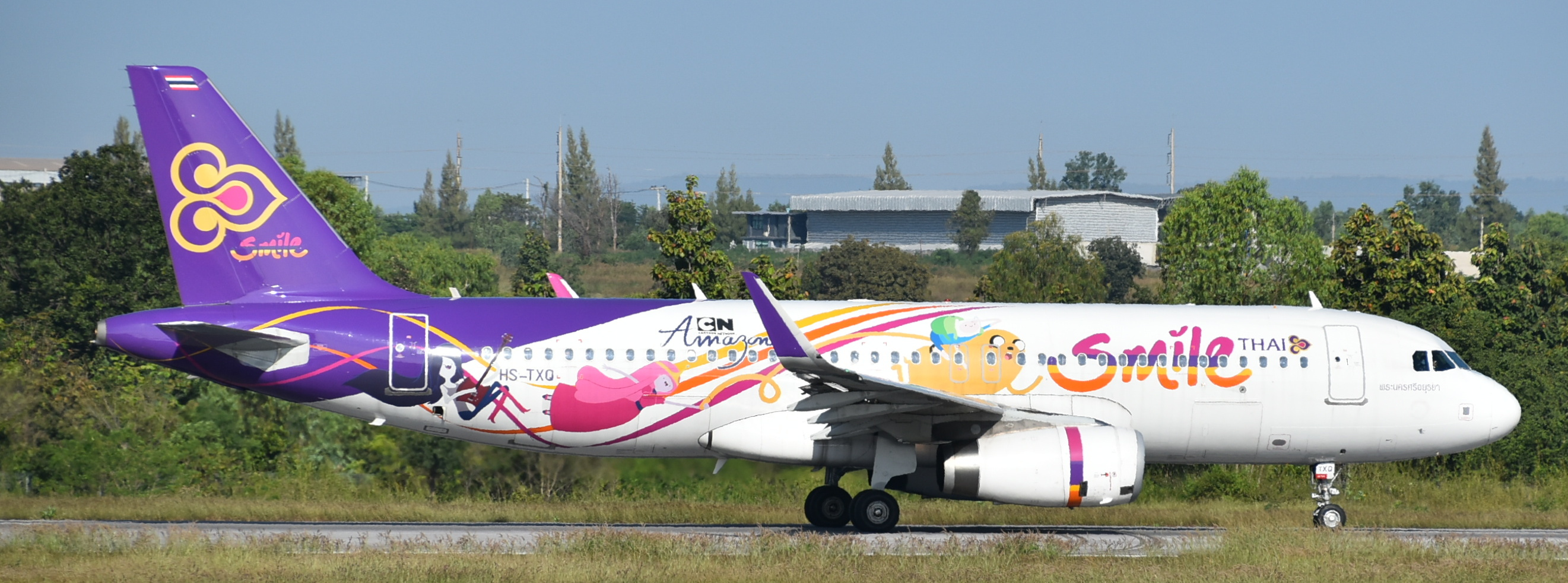
An Airbus A320 (SL) in Khon Kaen, Thailand (2016)

"Leela and the Genestalk", an episode from the seventh season of the animated Comedy Central program Futurama, features a cameo of Finn and Jake, with DiMaggio (who voices Bender in Futurama) reprising his role as Jake for the appearance. Similarly, the twenty-eighth season premiere of the Fox series The Simpsons, entitled "Monty Burns' Fleeing Circus", includes a couch gag that parodies the title sequence to Adventure Time, complete with Pendleton Ward himself singing a spoof of the Adventure Time theme song. According to Al Jean, the executive producer of The Simpsons, "[The couch gag] was the brain child of Mike Anderson, our supervising director ... It's a really beautiful, elaborate crossover".

On the Portuguese talk show 5 Para A Meia-Noite, the humorist Eduardo Madeira, who portrayed a hater called Osório, used Princess Bubblegum and Marceline to mock the Eurovision Song Contest 2018's Portuguese contestants, Cláudia Pascoal and Isaura.

In the 2016 horror film Better Watch Out, the two boys in the film, Luke the antagonist and his friend Garrett, are fans of the series, and after subduing Luke's babysitter and using drugs and alcohol, the two boys play Fuck, Marry, Kill using Princess Bubblegum and Marceline as options.
