= A Glitch Is a Glitch =

- Adventure Time episode
- Episode no.: Season 5 Episode 15
- Directed by: David OReilly
- Written by: David OReilly
- Production code: 1014-120
- Original air date: April 1, 2013
- Running time: 11 minutes

Guest appearance
- David OReilly as a guest director

Episode chronology
← Previous "Simon & Marcy"	Next → "Puhoy"
- Adventure Time season 5

"A Glitch Is a Glitch" is the fifteenth episode of the fifth season of the American animated television series Adventure Time. It was written, storyboarded, and directed by Irish filmmaker David OReilly. It originally aired on Cartoon Network on April 1, 2013.

In this episode, the Ice King (voiced by Tom Kenny) creates a computer virus to delete everything in Ooo except him and Princess Bubblegum (voiced by Hynden Walch). Finn and Jake try to remove the virus before it can glitch out the universe.

"A Glitch Is a Glitch" is the second episode to feature CGI, the first being "Guardians of Sunshine". "A Glitch is a Glitch" is the only episode in the series to feature no 2D animation at all. Pendleton Ward, the show's creator, was a fan of OReilly's short films and decided to let him create his very own episode. The episode was seen by 2.004 million viewers, and received largely positive critical feedback.

== Plot ==
As Finn and Jake are drawing a picture of Ice King on their computer, a brick with a floppy disk taped to it flies in through their window. When they try to read the disk, they find a disturbing video of a woman eating her own hair. Jake tries to exit the video, but it produces a glitch that materializes outside the computer and begins to destroy their treehouse.

Meanwhile, in the Candy Kingdom, the Ice King appears and discusses with Princess Bubblegum a purported statement she made about going on a date with him if he was the last person in Ooo. Finn and Jake arrive and Ice King tells them that he created the virus so that, indeed, he will be the last person around, which will force Bubblegum to go on a date with him. Finn and Jake attempt to save the Candy People, but are dismayed when they keep being "deleted". Finn manages to enter the "Universal Source Code" by breaking a hole in the virus' body. They find the virus, a grotesque digital likeness of Ice King's head, eating pieces of source code, which in turn deletes reality. Before they can reach the virus, Jake's and Finn's limbs are deleted. Meanwhile, Princess Bubblegum attempts to force Ice King to relinquish the anti-virus, only for him to reveal he did not make one.

Back in the Source Code, Finn attempts to slice open the virus but it eats his sword. When all seems lost, Jake remembers the video Ice King sent at the start of the episode, and both he and Finn start eating Finn's hair. Disgusted, the virus regurgitates all the chunks of code it consumed and is ejected from the Source Code. Everything returns to normal back on Ooo, and Princess Bubblegum then destroys Ice King's computer.

== Production ==
OReilly used a moiré pattern to visually present the idea of traveling through a "time tunnel".

"A Glitch Is a Glitch" was written, storyboarded, directed, and animated by Irish filmmaker and artist David OReilly. Pendleton Ward, the show's creator, was a fan of OReilly's short films and had contacted him in early 2010 about the possibility of OReilly directing an episode of the series. At the time OReilly, was busy making The External World, and he was forced to tell Ward that, due to his obligations, he would be unable to collaborate at the time. About a year later OReilly had moved to Los Angeles and they ran into each other a few times and started talking about the idea again. Reportedly, Ward allowed OReilly to have complete creative control over the episode, stipulating that OReilly was allowed to "do [his] own thing". OReilly later noted that he would have been happy to have animated one of the show's regular episodes, but he was extremely pleased that Ward gave him complete control over the episode, noting that, "It may be the only animated show in history to let a total outsider write and direct an episode." The final product had to be slightly modified, and some jokes had to be cut or edited, but OReilly explained that the finished product was still something he is proud of.

The initial video seen in the episode that gives the Land of Ooo a virus—featuring a girl eating her own hair—was created by OReilly and then released a few weeks before the episode aired. OReilly explained that he was trying to emulate shock sites. OReilly later said that some complained that the scene was "too extreme for kids' TV", but he argued that children were capable of tolerating it. OReilly found that mixing his trademark glitch style with good character animation was difficult, and presented a lot of technical hurdles. In particular, he found a scene in the end, wherein an earlier clip is superimposed above Finn and Jake to function almost as a thought bubble, to be easy to storyboard, but difficult to animate. To create the titular glitches, OReilly generated sprites inside of objects that produced random pixels which moved outwards to create colorful blotches. Some other glitch effects were created via jpeg corruption and datamoshing. OReilly also used moire patterns for the "time tunnel" sequence. All of these effects were then processed through compositing software, in an effect, controlling the glitches.

Music producer Steven Ellison, better known as Flying Lotus composed the music featured at the end of the episode. There were originally plans for OReilly to craft a completely different intro that Flying Lotus would score, so he sent over some tracks during production. In the end, the series did not have the time or money to recraft the intro, so the end credits sequence was created in its stead.

== Reception ==
"A Glitch is a Glitch" first aired on Cartoon Network on April 1, 2013. The episode was viewed by 2.004 million people. The network broadcast a promo for the episode that was edited in such a way that it did not use any clips from the episode itself.

Oliver Sava of The A.V. Club gave the entry a "B+", saying that "[The episode] falls on the far end of the weird spectrum, which is saying something with a show as odd as Adventure Time." In a separate article, he applauded the fact that the show was willing to try new styles of animation. Sava later wrote that while "Adventure Time's most experimental episode isn’t a full-fledged triumph, David OReilly’s completely 3-D animated installment reveals just how far outside the box this series is willing to go." Kendra Beltran of MTV Geek commented positively on the episode's unique animation style, and also wrote that the episode's main idea concerning a computer virus ending mankind was "a genius take on the world today", pointing out the attachment many people have to their electronic devices.
