= Crossover (Adventure Time) =

- Adventure Time episodes
- Episode nos.: Season 7 Episodes 23 (Note: The two halves of the earlier season seven episode "The More You Moe, The Moe You Know" were produced as two separate episodes, each with its own production code. However, Cartoon Network packaged them together as a single episode for inclusion on the season seven DVD release. As a result, "Crossover" is thus the twenty-third episode of the season produced, but only the twenty-second episode aired.)
- Directed by: Andres Salaff (Note: Supervising director); Sandra Lee (Note: Art director)
- Written by: Sam Alden; Jesse Moynihan
- Story by: Adam Muto; Jack Pendarvis; Kent Osborne
- Production code: 1034-226
- Original air date: January 28, 2016
- Running time: 11 minutes

Guest appearances
- Kumail Nanjiani as Prismo; Lou Ferrigno as Bobby; James Kyson as Big Destiny

Episode chronology
← Previous "Scamps"	Next → "The Hall of Egress"
- Adventure Time season 7

"Crossover" is the twenty-third episode of the seventh season of the American animated television series Adventure Time. The episode was written and storyboarded by Sam Alden and Jesse Moynihan, from an outline by showrunner Adam Muto, Jack Pendarvis, and head writer Kent Osborne. The episode, which debuted on January 28, 2016 on Cartoon Network, guest stars Kumail Nanjiani as Prismo, Lou Ferrigno as Bobby, and James Kyson as Big Destiny.

The series follows the adventures of Finn (voiced by Jeremy Shada), a human boy, and his best friend and adoptive brother Jake (voiced by John DiMaggio), a dog with magical powers to change shape and grow and shrink at will. In this episode, Finn and Jake crossover into Farmworld (an alternate dimension first created in the episode "Finn the Human") to stop Farmworld-Finn and the Jake-Lich from using an alternate version of the Enchiridion to open up doorways into all dimensions. After a long and drawn-out battle, Finn, Jake, and Farmworld-Finn team up to stop the Jake-Lich. Finn and Jake are able to use a magical device given to them by Prismo to remove the essence of the Lich from Farmworld Jake, returning Farmworld to normal.

"Crossover" was the first of several seventh-season episodes that Moynihan and Alden would work on; the two had previously collaborated on the sixth-season episode "The Mountain". Moynihan focused part of his attention on making sure that this episode would line up with the logic established in the fifth-season episode "Finn the Human" regarding alternate realities. Upon its airing, the episode was seen by 1.13 million viewers. It received largely positive reviews from critics, with several praising Nanjiani's voice work, as well as the aesthetic and design of the episode itself.

== Plot ==
=== Background ===
In the fourth-season finale, "The Lich", the series' main villain, the Lich (voiced by Ron Perlman), manages to open a portal to access the time room of Prismo (voiced by Kumail Nanjiani). In the fifth-season premiere, "Finn the Human", it is revealed that Prismo is a being that can grant wishes, and the Lich wishes for all life in the multiverse to be extinguished. Finn and Jake also enter Prismo's time room, and to undo the Lich's cataclysmic request, Finn wishes that "the Lich never even ever existed". Consequently, Finn is transported into a new "wish-altered reality", dubbed "Farmworld". In this version of Ooo, magic has been lost and the essence of the Lich was never released into the world via the detonation of a "mutagenic bomb". Furthermore, in this reality, Finn lives with his family and a non-magical dog named Jake. During the course of "Finn the Human", Finn finds the ice crown, a magical artifact. When he puts it on, he releases the essence of the Lich (who then possesses Farmworld-Jake's body), and re-introduces magic into the world. In "Jake the Dog", Jake, who has been still stuck in Prismo's time room after Finn is teleported to Farmworld, eventually wishes that the Lich's original request had merely been for "Finn and Jake to go home". With Jake's wish to seemingly undo what both the Lich and Finn wished for, Prismo believes that everything has been reset.

=== Events ===
Prismo summons Finn and Jake to his time room and reveals that Farmworld is still in existence; Farmworld-Finn has teamed up with the Jake-Lich, which could lead to destruction of all life in the multiverse. Prismo is powerless to stop this from occurring, and so he sends Finn and Jake to Farmworld with a device called "The Maid", which will clean up "all class-A inter-dimensional bung-ups." Once in the Farmworld universe, Finn and Jake discover that Farmworld-Finn has frozen all of that reality's humans in order to "save them". It is also revealed that the Jake-Lich has been possessing Big Destiny (voiced by James Kyson), gathering up the jewels needed to activate the Farmworld-version of the Enchiridion, so as to open up a portal to the multiverse.

Eventually, Finn and Jake are discovered, and the portal is opened. Just as the Jake-Lich is about to kill Jake, Finn's grass-arm activates, severing Jake-Lich's hand. Farmworld-Finn realizes he has been used by Jake-Lich, and he teams up with Finn and Jake. The portal is closed, and Finn manages to use The Maid to remove the Lich's essence from Farmworld-Jake's body. With their work complete, Finn and Jake are taken back to Prismo's time room. Out of pity for his alternate reality self, Finn convinces Prismo to destroy Farmworld's ice crown, allowing Farmworld-Finn to reunite with his family. Finn despondently watches this transpire, while Jake tries to comfort him as they watch.

== Production ==
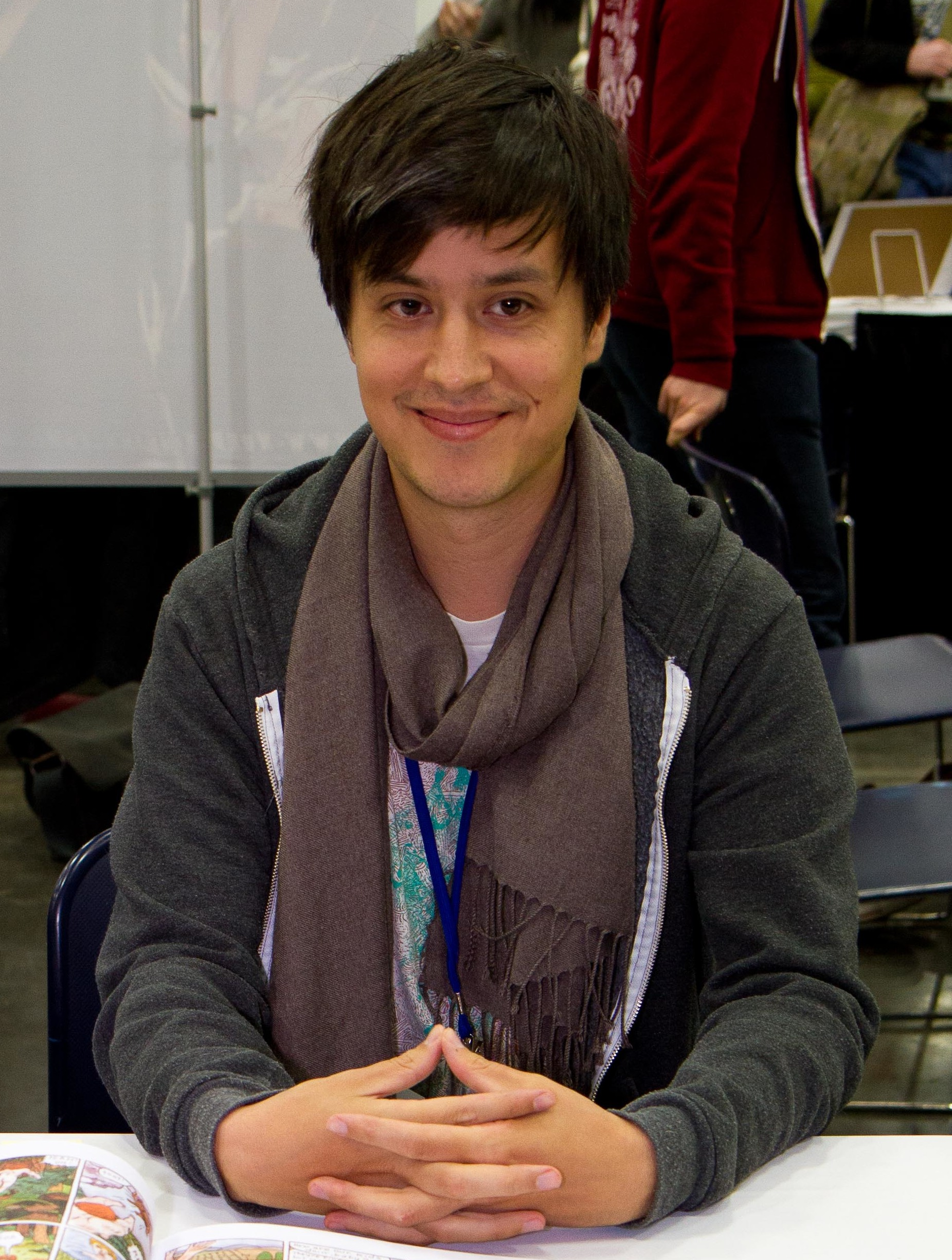
The episode was co-storyboarded by Jesse Moynihan.

The story for "Crossover" was developed by showrunner Adam Muto, Jack Pendarvis, and lead writer Kent Osborne. Sam Alden and Jesse Moynihan collaborated on the storyboard, which was submitted for network approval May 18, 2015, and eventually animated by Rough Draft Studios in South Korea. Supervising direction for the episode was carried out by Andres Salaff, whereas Sandra Lee handled the episode's art direction. This was Alden and Moynihan's first episode together since the sixth season episode "The Mountain". The episode sees the return of guest stars Ron Perlman, Kumail Nanjiani, and James Kyson; they reprise their characters Jake-Lich, Prismo, and Big Destiny, respectively. The episode also features Lou Ferrigno as Bobby, the Farmworld-version of the hero Billy.

Some scenes in this episode reference other media works. According to Pendarvis, the visual appearance of the Jake-Lich was based on a scene from Invasion of the Body Snatchers (1978), which featured a mutant dog with a man's face. During the episode's final scene, Farmworld Finn's father is seen emerging out of a block of ice. Alden revealed on Twitter that he had specifically storyboarded this sequence to mirror a similar scene in "Escape from the Citadel" that had been storyboarded by Steve Wolfhard, which featured Finn's father Martin emerging from a crystal prison cell. It was Alden's intention for these two scenes to mirror each other, given their similar content.

With the episode assigned to Alden and Moynihan, fellow storyboard artist Tom Herpich began to worry that the show would not be able to adequately explain why Farmworld continued to exist after the result of Jake's wish in "Jake the Dog". Herpich's concern caused Moynihan to also worry, and several discussions with Muto did little to quell his unease. In order to overcome this issue, Moynihan storyboarded several scenes featuring Prismo explaining why Farmworld continued to exist. Moynihan claimed that these additions were to ensure that "this shit made sense." In the end, however, these scenes were deemed unnecessary, and as such were excised from the episode. The sequences that depict the multiverse were designed by Moynihan, and to get the details right, he asked storyboard revisionist Julia Srednicki's father, who was a former quantum physicist, for assistance. Julia Srednicki's father provided several "articles and diagrams", which Moynihan then used when storyboarding the episode.

== Reception ==
"Crossover" aired on January 28, 2016. It was seen by 1.13 million viewers and scored a 0.29 Nielsen rating in the 18- to 49-year-old demographic (Nielsen ratings are audience measurement systems that determine the audience size and composition of television programming in the United States), which means that the episode was seen by 0.29 percent of all individuals aged 18 to 49 years old who were watching television at the time of the episode's airing.

The episode received positive reviews from critics. Oliver Sava of The A.V. Club awarded it an "A", calling it "a thrilling episode with some very impressive visuals". He also wrote that it "ends with a significant, unexpected emotional gut punch that takes advantage of the undercurrent of tragedy that runs through this post-post-apocalyptic series." Sava was complimentary towards Moynihan and Alden's storyboarding sensibilities, specifically highlighting their ability to balance the darker and more humorous aspects of the episode. Finally, the review also applauded Nanjiani's voice work, as well as the episode's "bold color choices and dramatic compositions that intesify the impact of the story".

Andrew Tran of Overmental wrote that the episode's plot device—parallel universes—"call[s] attention to the most basic function of fiction: to imaginatively, counterfactually ponder what never happened so we can understand what did happen, and perhaps more importantly, so we can edit our perspectives on reality." In regards to the latter point, Tran highlighted similarities between the episode, and news stories of the day, writing:

It looks as though every wish granted in this way causes an entirely new dimension to be born and exist independently and irrevocably, which is an intriguing idea for the current moment. Today's headlines are littered with activists and would-be revisionists attempting to either confront or whitewash this atrocity, or that new perspective, to either insert or obliterate narratives from history books, and effectively from the public consciousness. Hence, parallel dimension episodes are very much about historical authority and the fluidity of prevailing worldviews, and the threat that even a backwater dimension like Farmworld poses to Adventure Time‘s multiverse suggests that even the unlikeliest narrative, the most insane conspiracy theory, the most fringe historical revision, has a shot at existence, a chance to influence.

K-K Bracken of The Geekiary applauded the return of the Lich as well as Prismo, and she complimented the episode's creative dialogue and neologism, writing, "This kind of dialogue is not only giggle-worthy, it's also sneaking in vocabulary lessons for its target audience." Bracken also noted that Moynihan and Alden had good chemistry and that, in regards to Alden alone, "if this episode is any indication his future with the program looks bright indeed."
