= Billy's Bucket List =

- Adventure Time episode
- Episode no.: Season 5 Episode 52
- Directed by: Nate Cash (Note: Supervising director); Adam Muto; Nick Jennings (Note: Art director)
- Written by: Ako Castuera; Jesse Moynihan
- Story by: Kent Osborne; Pendleton Ward; Jack Pendarvis; Adam Muto
- Production code: 1014-159
- Original air date: March 17, 2014
- Running time: 11 minutes

Guest appearances
- Lou Ferrigno as Billy; Andy Samberg as Party Pat & Rap Bear; Mark Hamill as Fear Feaster; Ako Castuera as Canyon

Episode chronology
← Previous "Lemonhope Part 2"	Next → "Wake Up"
- Adventure Time season 5

"Billy's Bucket List" is the final episode of the fifth season of the American animated television series Adventure Time. The episode was written and storyboarded by Ako Castuera and Jesse Moynihan, from a story by Kent Osborne, Pendleton Ward, Jack Pendarvis, and Adam Muto. It originally aired on Cartoon Network on March 17, 2014. The episode guest stars Lou Ferrigno, Andy Samberg, and Mark Hamill; Castuera herself also voiced a character.

The series follows the adventures of Finn (voiced by Jeremy Shada), a human boy, and his best friend and adoptive brother Jake (voiced by John DiMaggio), a dog with magical powers to change shape and grow and shrink at will. In this episode, Finn finds Billy's (voiced by Ferrigno) bucket list and decides to complete the unfinished items, as a tribute toward the fallen hero. After completing most of the items, including giving Billy's ex-girlfriend Canyon (voiced by Castuera) one last motorcycle ride, and conquering his fear of the ocean, an apparition of Billy appears to Finn, telling him that Finn's biological father is still alive.

The episode was the last to feature Castuera as a storyboard artist until her return to the series during the seventh season; in the interim time, she focused on her art career. This episode also marked the last time Nate Cash was credited as supervising director; he left to direct the animated mini-series Over the Garden Wall. "Billy's Bucket List" was met with critical acclaim, with one reviewer complimenting the episode's cliffhanger and emotional growth. In addition, the episode was watched by 2.335 million viewers.

== Plot ==
During a freestyle rap battle with Rap Bear, hosted by Party Pat (voiced by Andy Samberg), Finn is approached by Billy's (voiced by Lou Ferrigno) ex-girlfriend, Canyon (voiced by Ako Castuera). She delivers Billy's loincloth to Finn, and Finn and she venture back to Billy's lair to pay their respects and move on. At his cavern, Finn defeats a group of fairies and then discovers a bucket list penned by Billy. Canyon and Finn decide to complete it as a tribute to the fallen hero. The two go on a joy ride in a desert environment, and afterwards Canyon and Finn part ways. Finn soon discovers that the list contains one more item hidden at the bottom left corner reading: "Lie on my back in the ocean. Just float."

Finn, terrified of the ocean, decides to do this final task for Billy, but the Fear Feaster (voiced by Mark Hamill) manifests and taunts him, until he knocks himself unconscious; during this time, he has an intense dream of swimming through the ocean and being consumed by a whale. Eventually he wakes up, and — possibly involuntarily — uses his grass sword to slice through and destroy the Fear Feaster, ending Finn's ocean fear for good. The spirit of Billy manifests itself before Finn in the sky, thanking him for completing his list. Before his spirit departs, he reveals to Finn that his human father is still alive, trapped in a mysterious place known only as the "Citadel".

== Production ==
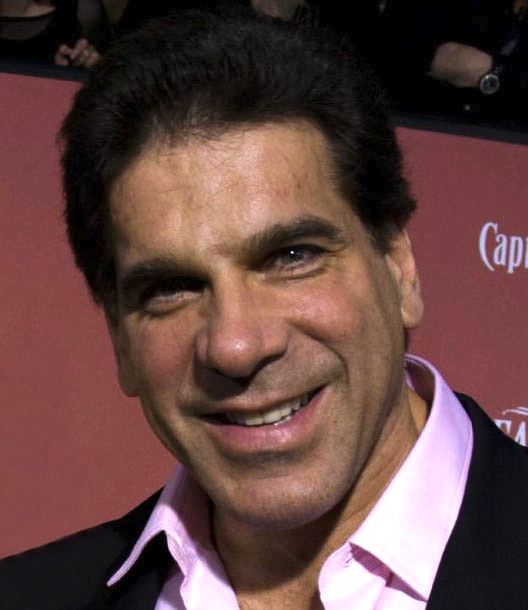
Lou Ferrigno reprised his role as Billy for this episode.

"Billy's Bucket List" was written and storyboarded by Ako Castuera and Jesse Moynihan, from a story by Kent Osborne, Pendleton Ward, Jack Pendarvis, and Adam Muto. This episode was the last to feature Castuera—who had been storyboarding on the show since the first season finale "Gut Grinder"—until her return to the series during the seventh season. According to Moynihan, Castuera left the show "to do something different and pursue other interests" as well as to "pursue a different path from television animation." On September 29, 2014, however, Kent Osborne posted an image on Instagram, confirming that Castuera and Moynihan would again be partners for the seventh season. Art direction was handled by Nick Jennings, whereas supervising direction was cohelmed by Nate Cash and Adam Muto. This episode marked the last time Nate Cash was credited as supervising director, as he later left the series to direct the animated mini-series Over the Garden Wall.

Castuera herself voiced Canyon. The episode also features the return of Lou Ferrigno as the hero Billy; Ferrigno had previously appeared in the first-season episode "His Hero" and the fourth season finale "The Lich". In addition, both comedian and rapper Andy Samberg, as well as actor Mark Hamill, reprise their roles as Party Pat and the Fear Feaster, respectively. Samberg had previously voiced the character in the second season episode "Belly of the Beast", whereas Hamill had appeared in the first-season episode, "Ocean of Fear".

The rap battle music was scored by Moynihan, who made heavy use of orchestra hits. The instrumental was later uploaded to SoundCloud and shared by the official Adventure Time production blog. In one of the episode's background art pieces, artist Derek Ballard inserted a buried car, homemade bombs, and a hole in the side of a cliff, additions that he claims were in honor of "one of America’s greatest film treasures: Tremors".

== Reception ==
"Billy's Bucket List" first aired on Cartoon Network on March 17, 2014. The episode was viewed by 2.335 million viewers and scored a 0.5 Nielsen rating in the 18- to 49-year-old demographic. Nielsen ratings are audience measurement systems that determine the audience size and composition of television programming in the United States, which means that the episode was seen by 0.5 percent of all households aged 18 to 49 years old were watching television at the time of the episode's airing. Furthermore, the episode was the 43rd most-watched cable program on the night it aired.

Oliver Sava of The A.V. Club awarded the episode an "A−", arguing that it was an example of the series' continued growth: he wrote, "as Finn grows, so does this series". Sava opined that, "the final minute of “Billy’s Bucket List” drops a major plot-bomb that gives the series an exciting direction for next season, and while the events leading up to the cliffhanger aren't quite as provocative or substantial as the last few episodes, they represent all the things that make this show such a great 10-minute oasis at the beginning of the week." Sava also noted that, "Trippy psychedelia is another major ingredient of this series, and 'Billy’s Bucket List' delivers a heavy serving when Finn finds himself underwater."

Andrea Reiher of Zap2it called the episode "a great ending to Season 5". Darren Franich of Entertainment Weekly awarded the episode an "A", noting that while the series "can do hilarious weirdness in its sleep," this episode in particular "showcases its soulfulness". He described the main plot as "oddly introspective", and wrote that the end was "a surprise reveal—a mythology boost that could push the show in a radical new direction."
