= Scamps =

Scamps may refer to:

- Episode #221 of Adventure Time season 7
- Sophie Scamps, Australian politician
