= The Hall of Egress =

- Adventure Time episodes
- Title Card
- Episode nos.: Season 7 Episodes 24 (Note: The two halves of the earlier season seven episode "The More You Moe, The Moe You Know" were produced as two separate episodes, each with its own production code. However, Cartoon Network packaged them together as a single episode for inclusion on the season seven DVD release. As a result, "The Hall of Egress" is thus the twenty-fourth episode of the season produced, but only the twenty-third episode aired.)
- Directed by: Andres Salaff (Note: Supervising director); Sandra Lee (Note: Art director)
- Written by: Tom Herpich
- Story by: Kent Osborne; Jack Pendarvis; Ashly Burch; Tom Herpich
- Production code: 1034-226
- Original air date: March 5, 2016
- Running time: 11 minutes

Episode chronology
← Previous "Crossover"	Next → "Flute Spell"
- Adventure Time season 7

"The Hall of Egress" is the twenty-fourth episode of the seventh season of the American animated television series Adventure Time. The episode—which was written and storyboarded by Tom Herpich, from a story by head writer Kent Osborne, Jack Pendarvis, Ashly Burch, and Herpich—debuted on March 5, 2016, on Cartoon Network.

The series follows the adventures of Finn (voiced by Jeremy Shada), a human boy, and his best friend and adoptive brother Jake (voiced by John DiMaggio), a dog with magical powers to change shape and grow and shrink at will. In this episode, Finn and Jake set out to find a dungeon, but, after the two find it, Finn ends up getting trapped within. In the center of the structure he finds a door that, when he closes his eyes, he is able to pass through. However, every time Finn opens his eyes, he is transported back to being outside the door.

"The Hall of Egress" marked the third time that Herpich had storyboarded an episode by himself (the first instance being the third season episode "Thank You", and the second being the sixth season episode "Walnuts & Rain"). Elements in the episode were inspired by, among other things, songs by M83 and the business practices of P. T. Barnum. Upon its airing, the episode was seen by 1.245 million viewers, and received largely positive reviews from critics. It was later nominated for a Primetime Emmy Award for Short-format Animation at the 68th Primetime Emmy Awards in 2016.

== Plot ==
External videos
- FULL EPISODE: Hall of Egress Adventure Time Cartoon Network — Official upload of the episode onto YouTube

Finn and Jake set out to find a dungeon, but soon after discovering it, Finn ends up getting trapped within. In the center of the structure he finds a door that, when he closes his eyes, he is able to pass through. On the other side of this door is a maze, and past the maze is the outside world. However, every time Finn opens his eyes, he is transported back from where he came: outside the door. At first, Finn tries to live his life blindfolded, but he is always somehow forced to open his eyes. He eventually sets off on his own and wanders into an identical dungeon. In the center of this structure is a door that he can only pass through by opening his eyes. Finn does just that, and in doing so manages to escape the Hall of Egress.

== Production ==
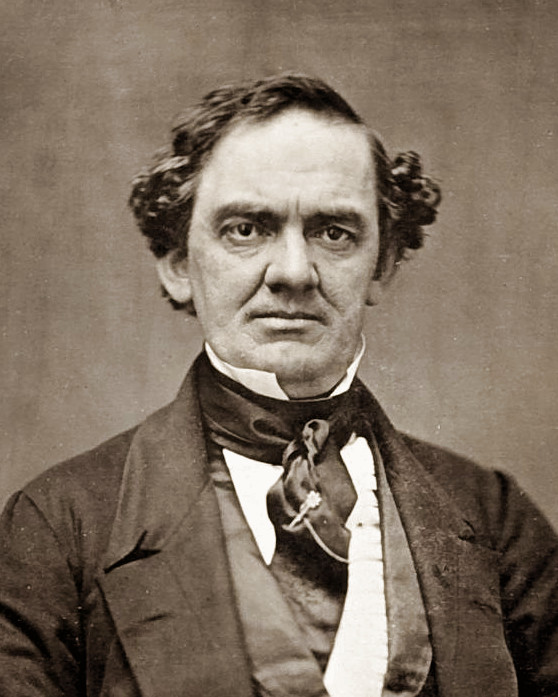
A deleted scene from this episode was based on the business practices of P. T. Barnum.

The story for "The Hall of Egress" was developed by lead writer Kent Osborne, Jack Pendarvis, Ashly Burch, and storyboard artist Tom Herpich. Herpich himself worked on the episode's storyboard, marking the third time that he had storyboarded an episode by himself (the first instance being the third season episode "Thank You", and the second being the sixth season episode "Walnuts & Rain"). The storyboard for "The Hall of Egress" was completed on May 22, 2015, and the episode was eventually animated by SAEROM Studios in South Korea. Andres Salaff served as the episode's supervising director, and Sandra Lee handled art direction.

In the episode's storyboard, Herpich added a note that for the line "Hurry, Finn, because at the seashell's center lies the cornucopia's smallest door" (which is spoken by Hynden Walch's Princess Bubblegum during Finn's climactic rush through the now-visible maze), the dialogue was to be "integrated into the propulsive, triumphant, poignant soundtrack". Herpich was inspired by the M83 songs "Intro", "Reunion", and "OK Pal" from the album Hurry Up, We're Dreaming (2011), all of which mix music with soft, spoken-word elements.

Originally, when he was storyboarding the episode, Herpich included a longer scene that explains how Finn knew what the word "egress" meant. In this short sequence, Finn recalls a time he went to a sideshow and noticed a sign that read "This way to the Egress". Curious as to what an "egress" might be, he followed the sign, only to find himself having passed through the sideshow's exit. This was a reference to an actual practice of P. T. Barnum, who placed signs (which read "This way to the Egress") throughout his American Museum that many believed would lead to a strange creature known as the "egress". What they failed to realize was that "egress" was simply a fancy but obfuscating word for "exit". Only upon passing through the egress would they realize their mistake. And since they had left the exhibit early, they would be forced to once again pay for admission if they wished to finish touring the museum. This scene was eventually scrapped due to time constraints and replaced with a shorter one in which Finn asks Princess Bubblegum the definition of the word; Herpich also mused that the scene was cut because "the [P. T. Barnum] reference might be too obscure" for casual viewers.

== Reception ==
"The Hall of Egress" aired on March 5, 2016. It was seen by 1.245 million viewers and scored a 0.3 Nielsen rating in the 18- to 49-year-old demographic (Nielsen ratings are audience measurement systems that determine the audience size and composition of television programming in the United States), which means that the episode was seen by 0.3 percent of all individuals aged 18 to 49 years old who were watching television at the time of the episode's airing.

Oliver Sava of The A.V. Club awarded the episode an "A–", calling it "a fascinating psychological horror story about a boy shedding everything that defines him in order to move on to the next phase of his life." Sava noted that while the episode was humorous, much of the comedy was undercut by the tragic and distressing nature of Finn's story. Andrew Tran of Overmental argued that "the episode ... dissects vividly that bottomless feeling of midlife wanderlust ... not the road-trippy, running-through-the-fields kind [but rather] the life-map-disappearing-in-your-hands, what-the-hell-is-next kind." Tran contended that, through the use of video game tropes, explores the idea that life is ultimately unpredictable that there "is no map that you can make for yourself (or that anyone can give you) that can account for everything you’re going to encounter". "The Hall of Egress" has been highly lauded by the show's production staff, with series creator Pendleton Ward in particular naming it as one of his favorites. According to the crew, "It was just so thoughtfully done."

At the 68th Primetime Emmy Awards in 2016, "The Hall of Egress" was nominated for a Primetime Emmy Award for Short-format Animation. The episode lost to the Robot Chicken episode "Robot Chicken Christmas Special: The X-Mas United".
