= Wake Up and Escape from the Citadel =

"Wake Up" and "Escape from the Citadel"
- Adventure Time episodes
- Betrayed by his father and left behind, Finn loses his right arm. Oliver Sava of The A.V. Club wrote that the transformation of Finn's arm was similar to Tetsuo Shima's transformation in the anime film Akira.
- Episode nos.: Season 6 Episodes 1 & 2
- Directed by: Elizabeth Ito (Note: Supervising director, "Wake Up"); Adam Muto (Note: Supervising director, "Escape from the Citadel"); Nick Jennings (Note: Art director)
- Written by: Andy Ristaino (Note: Storyboard artist, "Wake Up"); Cole Sanchez; Tom Herpich (Note: Storyboard artist, "Escape from the Citadel"); Steve Wolfhard
- Story by: Kent Osborne; Pendleton Ward; Jack Pendarvis; Adam Muto
- Production codes: 1025-166; 1025-163
- Original air date: April 21, 2014
- Running time: 22 minutes

Guest appearances
- Kumail Nanjiani as Prismo; M. Emmet Walsh as the Cosmic Owl; Miguel Ferrer as Death, Grod; Ethan Maher as Sweet P; Ron Perlman as the Lich; Stephen Root as Martin

Episode chronology
← Previous "Billy's Bucket List"	Next → "James II"
- Adventure Time season 6

"Wake Up" and "Escape from the Citadel" are the first two episodes of the sixth season of the American animated television series Adventure Time. "Wake Up" was written and storyboarded by Andy Ristaino and Cole Sanchez, whereas "Escape from the Citadel" was storyboarded by Tom Herpich and Steve Wolfhard. Both episodes' stories were developed by Kent Osborne, Pendleton Ward, Jack Pendarvis, and Adam Muto. The two episodes originally aired on Cartoon Network on April 21, 2014. The episodes guest star Kumail Nanjiani as Prismo, M. Emmet Walsh as the Cosmic Owl, Miguel Ferrer as Death, Ron Perlman as the Lich, and Stephen Root as Martin.

The series follows the adventures of Finn (voiced by Jeremy Shada), a human boy, and his best friend and adoptive brother Jake (voiced by John DiMaggio), a dog with magical powers to change shape and grow and shrink at will. In "Wake Up", Finn and Jake try to commit a cosmic crime in order to gain access to a multiverse prison called the Citadel to meet Finn's father, where he is trapped. Prismo (voiced by Nanjiani) offers to help them, but he is murdered by the Lich (voiced by Perlman). In "Escape from the Citadel", Jake, Finn, and the Lich are transported to the Citadel, where Finn and Jake meet Martin (voiced by Root), Finn's father, who is not what Finn expected. The three are forced to run from the Lich, as he begins to destroy the Citadel. At this time, Martin flees, and Finn tries to give chase, but his grass sword takes over his entire arm, causing Finn to lose it. Despite Finn's loss of his father and limb, Finn and Jake are vindicated when the Lich is turned into a giant baby.

Both "Wake Up" and "Escape from the Citadel", were met with critical acclaim. Robert Lloyd of the Los Angeles Times felt that the episode was exciting, whereas Oliver Sava of The A.V. Club applauded the episode's use of humor as a way of balancing out the heavier aspects of the plot. Many of the reviews also praised Nanjiani's return as Prismo. Reviews were also complimentary towards the darker nature of "Escape from the Citadel". Both episodes were watched by 3.321 million viewers.

== Plot ==
=== "Wake Up" ===
Jake is partying with Prismo (voiced by Kumail Nanjiani). At the party, Peppermint Butler (voiced by Steve Little) and Death (voiced by Miguel Ferrer) note the Lich (voiced by Ron Perlman) is sitting ominously in the corner. Prismo explains that, after the events of an earlier episode, the Lich, an entity driven by the pursuit of causing mass death, is now harmless, functioning like a machine without a purpose. Later, Finn confronts Jake about the revelation that his father is still alive. Jake convinces him to ask Prismo to send them to the Citadel. Prismo explains that the Citadel is a prison, and the only way to gain access to the Citadel is to commit a cosmic crime; he instructs Finn and Jake to find and wake a certain old man who is asleep in the debris surrounding his Time Room.

It is revealed that this man is the actual, corporeal Prismo, and the version Finn and Jake are familiar with is merely a dream. Prismo explains that killing a wishmaster—as in, waking up the man—is a cosmic crime, but that he will return when his corporeal body falls back asleep. At that instant, the Lich springs into action, physically waking and destroying Prismo, killing him. Suddenly, an interdimensional being arrives and begins taking the Lich to the Citadel, to which Finn and Jake give chase.

=== "Escape from the Citadel" ===
Finn and Jake grab hold of the captured Lich as he is transported to the Citadel. Once there, they discover a human figure encased in a crystal-like substance, who they conclude must be Finn's father. Meanwhile, the Lich uses his malevolent magic to begin melting the Citadel and turning its prisoners to his will. Finn's father, Martin (voiced by Stephen Root), is eventually freed by the Lich's actions, and as the Citadel guardians battle the escaping prisoners he, Finn, and Jake try to escape. One of the Citadel guardians, however, uses its laser and melts away part of Martin's flesh on his leg. Finn retrieves some guardian blood, which repairs and heals Martin. However, Finn starts to realize that his father is not the hero that he thought he would be.

Soon thereafter, Martin leaves Finn and Jake to save himself and the Lich appears, ordering Finn to fall. He delivers a monologue, explaining his desire to extinguish all life in the universe. Finn, overcome by the Lich's power, feebly tries to fight back and ends up throwing some of the guardian blood on the Lich, which causes him to grotesquely begin growing flesh. With the Lich disposed of, Finn pursues his father, who is hitching a ride with escaping criminals on a loose piece of the Citadel, still held on by a vein. One of the criminals cuts the vein, but Finn holds on, causing his grass sword to envelop his arm and eventually rip away, severing it. After Martin escapes, Jake eventually reveals to Finn that the Lich has now been turned into a large humanoid baby; the two leave him on the doorstep of Tree Trunks (voiced by Polly Lou Livingston) and Mr. Pig's house.

== Production ==
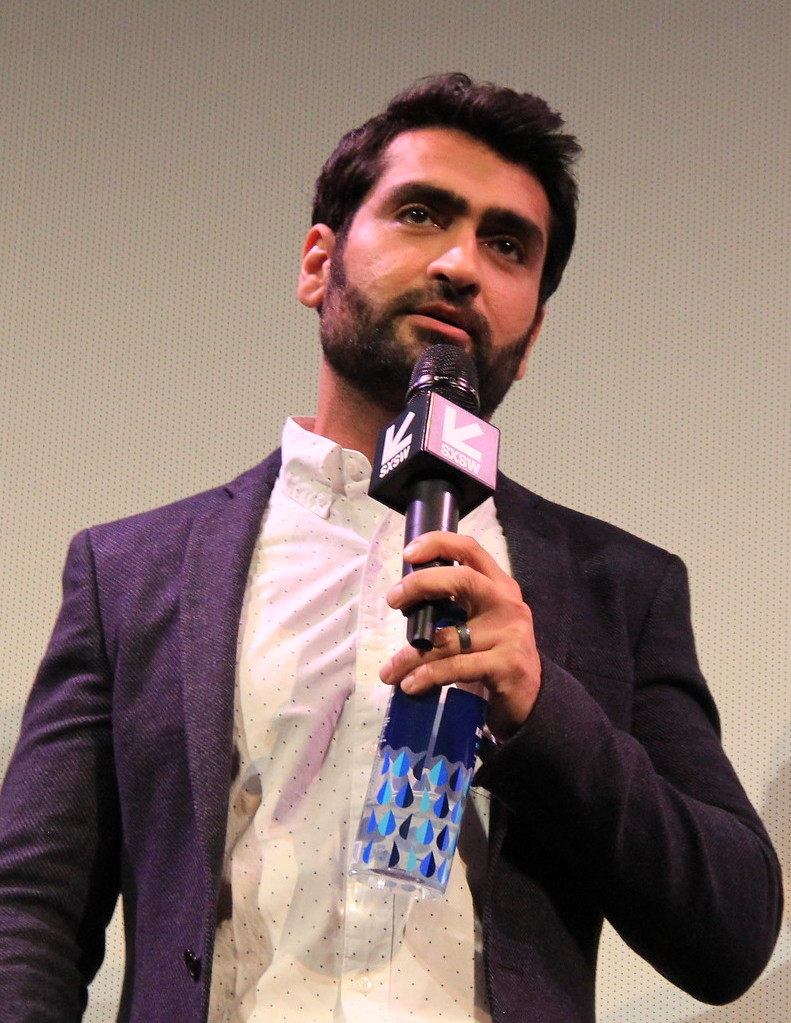
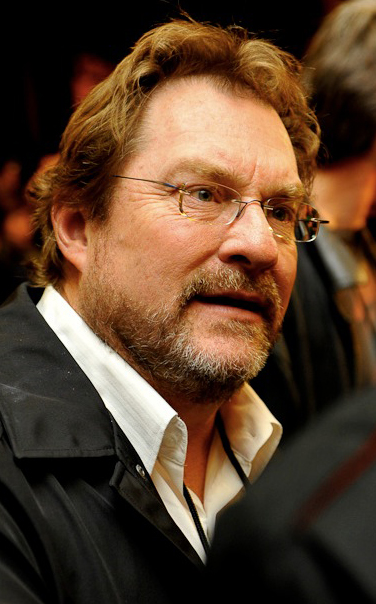
The episode guest starred Kumail Nanjiani (left) and Stephen Root (right) among others.

"Wake Up" was written and storyboarded by Andy Ristaino and Cole Sanchez, whereas "Escape from the Citadel" was storyboarded by Tom Herpich and Steve Wolfhard; both episodes' stories were developed by Kent Osborne, Pendleton Ward, Jack Pendarvis, and Adam Muto. Art direction was handled by Nick Jennings, whereas supervising direction was handled by Elizabeth Ito (for "Wake Up") and Muto (for "Escape from the Citadel"). The design for the Citadel, which is featured in both episodes, was crafted by Herpich, who used Google SketchUp to design a 3-D model of the structure.

"Escape from the Citadel" featured the introduction of Finn's father, Martin. Because previous episodes illustrated that Finn had had good and loving adoptive parents in Joshua and Margaret, the writers for the series wanted to craft Martin so that he would not be a "carbon copy" of his son. Wolfhard pushed for the idea that Martin would be "as roguish and dishonorable as Finn is heroic". According to Muto, Martin's design "was based on [Wolfhard's] impression of Sean Connery's costume in [the 1974 film] Zardoz without having seen the movie."

"Wake Up" featured the return of Kumail Nanjiani as Prismo, M. Emmet Walsh as the Cosmic Owl, and Miguel Ferrer as Death and one of the heads of Grob Gob Glob Grod. Martin is voiced by Stephen Root. Root had previously voiced the characters Grimby and the Royal Tart Toter in the second season episode "The Other Tarts". Ethan Maher voiced the baby version of the Lich. Herpich himself played the part of the Void Caster.

These two episodes were affected by the censorship applied by Turner Broadcasting System Europe to airings of their shows around Europe and they were never aired in countries such as Spain or Poland. The episodes were made available in United Kingdom for the first time in 2026, with "Escape from the Citadel" containing cuts to some scenes.

== Cultural references ==
When the Lich is addressing Finn, he refers to the escaped criminals as "Ancients", a reference to one of the many name for deities in H.P. Lovecraft's Cthulhu Mythos. Oliver Sava of The A.V. Club wrote that the transformation of Finn's arm was similar to Tetsuo Shima's transformation in the anime film Akira. Jason Krell of io9 noted parallels between the scene immediately following the loss of Finn's arm and the end of the 1980 film The Empire Strikes Back.

== Reception ==
"Wake Up" and "Escape from the Citadel", first aired on Cartoon Network on April 21, 2014. The episodes were viewed by 3.321 million viewers and scored a 0.7 Nielsen rating in the 18- to 49-year-old demographic. Nielsen ratings are audience measurement systems that determine the audience size and composition of television programming in the United States, which means that the episodes were seen by 0.7 percent of all 18- to 49-year-olds who were watching television at the time of the episodes' airing. Furthermore, the episode was the 23rd most-watched cable program on the night it aired. These episodes were the last to have been watched by over 3 million viewers.

Both episodes received largely positive reviews from television critics. Robert Lloyd of the Los Angeles Times, wrote that "Wake Up" and "Escape from the Citadel" form a "beautiful, strange and exciting" two-part special episode of the series. He specifically cited the plot as a highlight, as well as the return to the series by Nanjiani as Prismo. Eric Kohn of IndieWire awarded both this episode and "Escape from the Citadel" an "A−", writing that while the episode featured extremely dark material, it was never presented in a way so as to drive viewers away. Kohn wrote highly of the comedy and naturalistic dialogue that took place during Prismo's opening party in "Wake Up", and felt that the addition about Prismo's origins helped the show slip "in a certain wise gaze [concerning] the fog of time". In regards to "Escape from the Citadel", he also noted that "the fate of the Lich takes an amusing new turn," and that the storyline concerning "Finn's cursed sword arm—an ingredient that has festered in the sidelines for weeks—reaches a beguiling new state."

Oliver Sava of The A.V. Club awarded "Wake Up" and "Escape from the Citadel" an "A". Sava praised Nanjiani's "delightfully low-key" performance in the former, noting that his "soft, smooth voice is perfect for a character that is so laid back he's completely flat, and his casual delivery of ominous lines helps keep the tone light as the material gets heavier." Furthermore, he noted that the jokes were more pronounced in this episode, making the opening scene during Prismo's party that much funnier. Sava felt that the Lich's monologue to Finn in "Escape from the Citadel" was "even creepier thanks to Ron Perlman's gravely voice for The Lich and the evocative staging by writers/storyboard artists Tom Herpich and Steve Wolfhard", who were able to "achieve a fascinating combination of terror and hope when Finn touches The Lich with Guardian blood and starts a grotesquely stunning transformation that strips the villain of his power by making him a giant baby." Sava also complimented the episode for being full of harsh realizations concerning Finn's father and the vulnerability of his body. Ultimately he concluded that "the developments of these two episodes dramatically alter the series' status quo to give this season an added boost of momentum from the very beginning."
