= Adventure Time season 7 =

Adventure Time
- Season 7
- DVD cover
- Showrunner: Adam Muto
- Starring: Jeremy Shada; John DiMaggio
- No. of episodes: 26 (Note: The two halves of the season seven episode "The More You Moe, The Moe You Know" were produced as two separate episodes, each with its own production code. However, the official season seven DVD counts the two parts of "The More You Moe, The Moe You Know" as making up a single, collective episode, resulting in the DVD packaging listing only 25 episodes. "The More You Moe, The Moe You Know" is being listed here as comprising two episodes to be consistent with the treatment of previous two-parters (e.g., season five's "Lemonhope", season three's "Holly Jolly Secrets").)

Release
- Original network: Cartoon Network
- Original release: November 2, 2015 – March 19, 2016

Season chronology
- ← Previous; Season 6 Next → Season 8

The seventh season of Adventure Time, an American animated television series created by Pendleton Ward, premiered on Cartoon Network on November 2, 2015, and concluded on March 19, 2016. It follows the adventures of Finn, a human boy, and his best friend and adoptive brother Jake, a dog with magical powers to change shape and size at will. Finn and Jake live in the post-apocalyptic Land of Ooo, where they interact with the show's other main characters: Princess Bubblegum, The Ice King, Marceline the Vampire Queen, Lumpy Space Princess, BMO, and Flame Princess.

The seventh season of Adventure Time features an eight-episode story-arc, promoted and originally broadcast as the miniseries Stakes, which examines Marceline's backstory and follows Finn, Jake, Bubblegum, and Marceline as they attempt to defeat several newly resurrected vampires. This season also features the stop-motion episode "Bad Jubies", directed by guest animator Kirsten Lepore.

The season premiered with the episode "Bonnie & Neddy", which was viewed by 1.07 million viewers (this marked a decrease in ratings from the previous season finale, "Hot Diggity Doom"/"The Comet"). The Stakes miniseries, which aired near the beginning of the season, rated well, with each episode being seen by around 1.8 million viewers. The season concluded with "The Thin Yellow Line", which was watched by 1.15 million viewers; this made it the lowest-rated Adventure Time season finale at the time. Critical reception to the season was largely positive, and the episode "The Hall of Egress" was nominated for a Primetime Emmy Award for Short-format Animation at the 68th Primetime Emmy Awards. At the same event, Herpich and Jason Kolowski each won an Emmy Award for Outstanding Individual Achievement in Animation, for their work on "Stakes Part 8: The Dark Cloud" and "Bad Jubies", respectively. "Bad Jubies" won an Annie Award for Best Animated Television/Broadcast Production for Children. Several compilation DVDs that contain episodes from the season have been released, and the full season was released on DVD on July 18, 2017.

== Development ==
=== Concept ===
The series follows the adventures of Finn the Human, a human boy, and his best friend Jake, a dog with magical powers to change shape and size at will. Finn and Jake live in the post-apocalyptic Land of Ooo, wherein they interact with the other major characters, including: Princess Bubblegum, The Ice King, Marceline the Vampire Queen, Lumpy Space Princess, BMO, and Flame Princess. Common storylines revolve around Finn and Jake discovering strange creatures, dealing with the antagonistic but misunderstood Ice King, and battling monsters in order to help others. Multi-episode story arcs for this season include Bubblegum adjusting to life in exile and eventually reclaiming the Candy Kingdom crown, and Marceline coming to terms with her vampiric nature.

=== Production ===
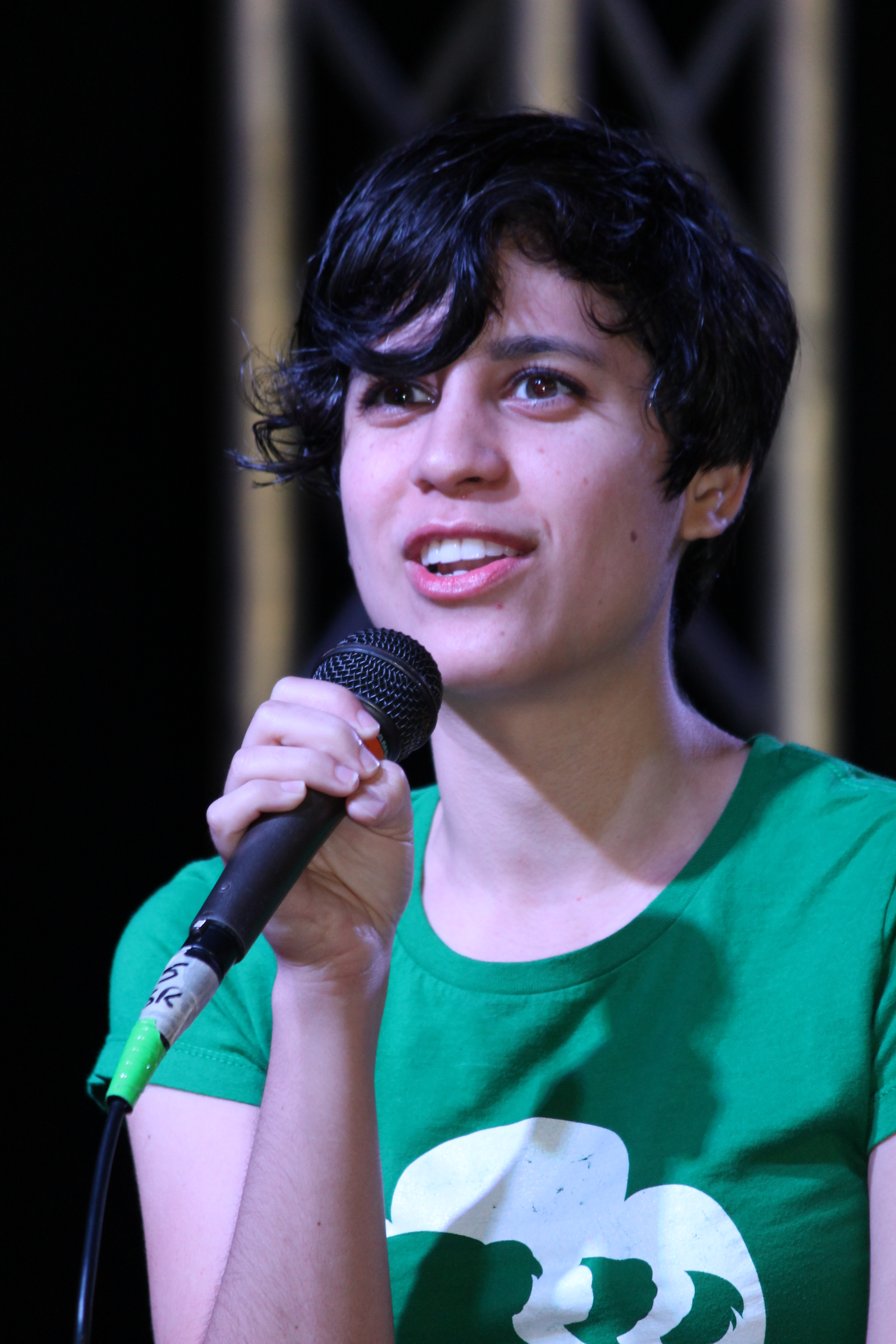
This season features episode outlines penned by Ashly Burch.

On July 25, 2014, the series was renewed for a seventh season. On September 26, 2014, Tom Herpich posted a picture on Tumblr of himself and Steve Wolfhard pitching the season premiere to the Adventure Time crew, suggesting that storyboarding for the season had already commenced. By August 9, 2015, production of the season had been completed and most of the staff's focus had shifted to the eighth season. In regards to the tone of the season, at the 2015 New York Comic Con, Muto said that this season focuses more on telling "simpler stories with the characters". While he contrasted the show's seventh season with its sixth—which he described as "heady"—Muto asserted that the seventh season would not be a "throwback" to the show's earlier seasons, which had been defined by their focus on comedy.

Originally, the show's seventh season comprised episodes "Bonnie & Neddy" through "Reboot", for a total of 39. (Note: In the past, Adam Muto (the series' showrunner) had explicitly referred to "Preboot"/"Reboot" as being the collective finale to season seven. This ordering of the season was delineated by an image that hung in Muto's office, which listed episodes "Bonnie & Neddy" through "Reboot" as belonging to season seven.) However, when it came time to upload the seventh season onto streaming sites, Cartoon Network chose to end the season with its 26th episode, "The Thin Yellow Line." The network then began counting the remaining 13 episodes (which included "Broke His Crown" through "Reboot") as making up the first portion of season eight, despite their having been produced as part of the seventh. This new episode count was cemented by the release of the complete seventh season DVD on July 18, 2017, which included episodes up until "The Thin Yellow Line".

This season's episodes were produced in a process similar to those of the previous seasons. Each episode was outlined in two-to-three pages that contained the necessary plot information. These outlines were then handed to storyboard artists, who created full storyboards. (Note: Information regarding story development and storyboard artists is taken from the opening credits of the season's twenty-six episodes.) Design and coloring were done at Cartoon Network Studios in Burbank, California, and animation was handled overseas in South Korea by Rough Draft Korea and Saerom Animation. Kirsten Lepore directed the episode "Bad Jubies", which was animated via stop motion, continuing a tradition from the previous two seasons of using a guest animator for an episode. Lepore had previously animated the short stop-motion tag for Frederator Studios, one of the series' production companies. There was a sneak peek of "Bad Jubies" at the Annecy International Animated Film Festival on June 19, 2015, several months before the season's premiere.

Pearson—a British cartoonist who had worked on the fifth season with Xayaphone—was temporarily hired to storyboard two episodes with Partridge. Similarly, Castuera, who had stepped down from her role as a regular storyboard artist after the fifth season, returned in a temporary role for three episodes with Moynihan.

While series creator Pendleton Ward worked on a few outlines for this season, Osborne told IndieWire that Ward did not take an active role in developing stories that were produced after November 2014. Ward had an oversight role and provided occasional input, focusing much of his attention on developing an Adventure Time movie. In February 2015, Ashly Burch was hired to write story outlines for the show. Burch had voiced several characters in the sixth season before becoming a permanent member of the writing staff. She later joked that, because she was a fan of the show prior to being hired, writing for the show was akin to writing fan fiction.

=== Miniseries ===
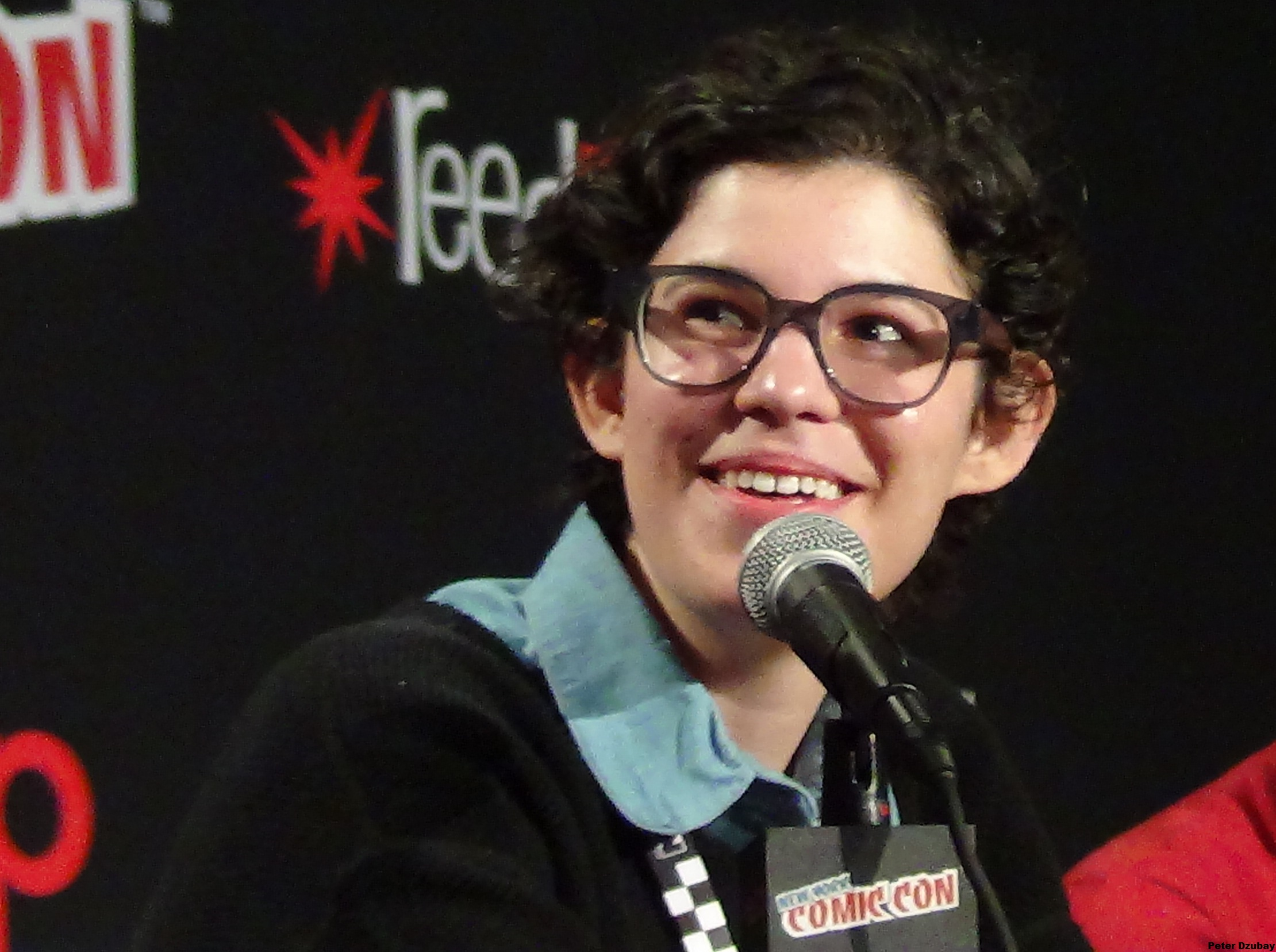
Rebecca Sugar returned to write a song for the miniseries.

On February 18, 2015, during Cartoon Network's upfront announcing shows for their 2015–16 season, the network announced a special miniseries, which would air as part of season seven. Cartoon Network was encouraged to greenlight the miniseries after the success of the 2014 event series Over the Garden Wall, which was created by Pat McHale, the former creative director of Adventure Time. The eight-episode miniseries, entitled Stakes, follows Finn and Jake as they face a new threat brought about when one of Princess Bubblegum's science projects unleashes the ghosts of Marceline's past. Former storyboard artist Rebecca Sugar returned to write a new song for the miniseries (entitled "Everything Stays") and to voice Marceline's mother.

== Cast ==
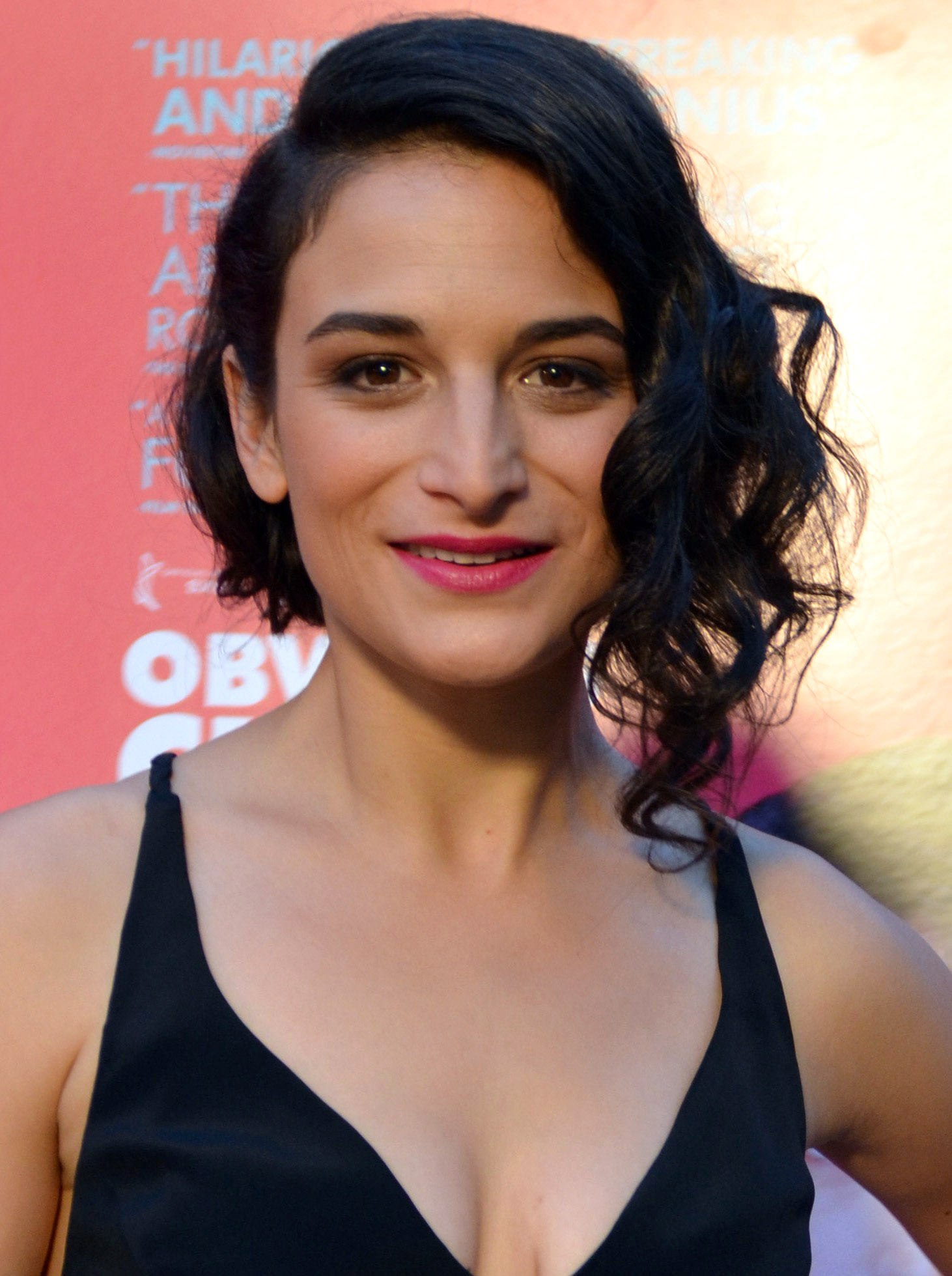
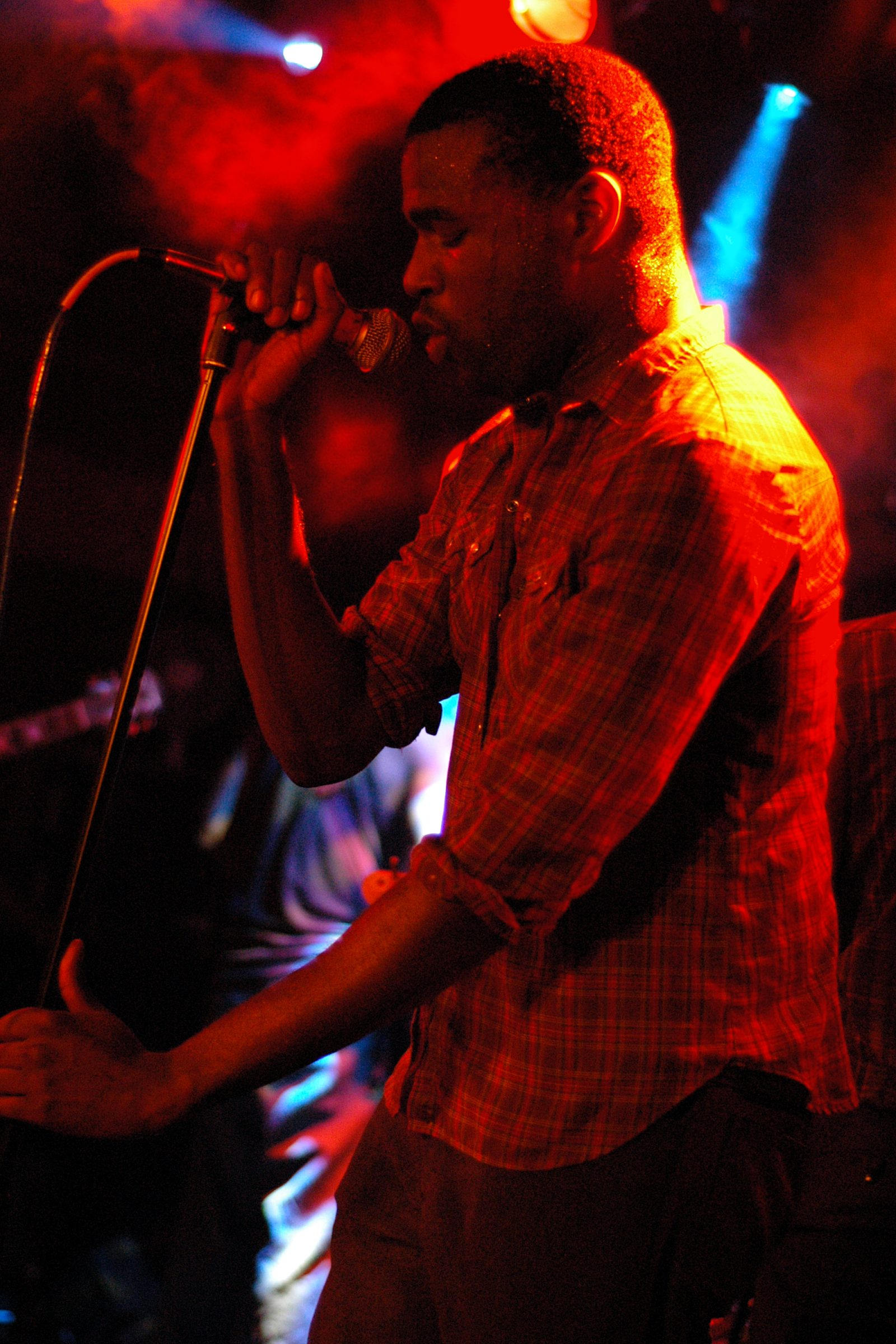
Several guest stars lent their voices to Adventure Time characters for the very first time this season, including Jenny Slate (left) and Tunde Adebimpe (right).

The voice actors for the season included: Jeremy Shada (Finn the Human), John DiMaggio (Jake the Dog), Tom Kenny (The Ice King), Hynden Walch (Princess Bubblegum), and Olivia Olson (Marceline the Vampire Queen). Ward provided the voice for several minor characters, including Lumpy Space Princess. Former storyboard artist Niki Yang voices the sentient video game console BMO in English, as well as Jake's girlfriend Lady Rainicorn in Korean. Polly Lou Livingston, a friend of Pendleton Ward's mother, Bettie Ward, voices the small elephant, Tree Trunks. Jessica DiCicco voices Flame Princess, Finn's ex-girlfriend and the sovereign of the Fire Kingdom. Andy Milonakis voices N.E.P.T.R., a sentient robot who makes and throws pies. Several episodes also feature The Lich, the series' principal antagonist. The Lich's demonic form is voiced by Ron Perlman. The Adventure Time cast recorded their lines together to capture more natural-sounding dialogue among the characters. Hynden Walch has described these group sessions as akin to "doing a play reading—a really, really out there play."

Guest voices were provided by actors, musicians, artists, and others. Andy Daly returned as the King of Ooo and Paul Scheer as Toronto in the season premiere "Bonnie and Neddy". Daly would go on to be featured in other season seven episodes as well, like "Varmints", "Mama Said", "May I Come In?", "Take Her Back", and "The Dark Cloud". "Bonnie & Neddy" also features supervising director Andres Salaff voicing Neddy. Anne Heche returned to voice the titular character in "Cherry Cream Soda", and storyline writer Jack Pendarvis reprised his role as Root Beer Guy. Pendarvis returned in the episode "Mama Said", with storyboard artist Ako Castuera as the voice of Canyon. The miniseries features Sugar as Marceline's mother, Ava Acres as a young Marceline, Rebecca Romijn as The Empress, Billy Brown as the Vampire King, Paul Williams as the Hierophant, Ron Funches as the Fool, Beau Billingslea as the Moon, and Kyle Kinane as Cloud Dance. "The More You Moe, the Moe You Know" features Chuck McCann reprising his role as Moe, and guest stars Thu Tran as AMO. Paget Brewster and Ron Lynch return in "Summer Showers" and voice Viola and Mr. Pig, respectively. In "Angel Face", Kyla Rae Kowalewski reprises her role as Me-Mow. "Weird Al" Yankovic returns as Banana Man in "President Porpoise is Missing", with James Urbaniak as Vice President Blowfish. Kevin Michael Richardson appears in "Bad Jubies", lending his voice to an automated storm alert and an aggressive storm. In "King's Ransom", storyboard artist Tom Herpich reprises the role of Mr. Fox. Max Charles appears in "Scamps", voicing Hugo the chocolate-dipped marshmallow. "Crossover" features Kumail Nanjiani and James Kyson reprising their roles of Prismo and Big Destiny, respectively; Lou Ferrigno appears in the same episode, playing Bobby, an alternate universe variant of the hero Billy. In "Flute Spell", Jenny Slate voices Huntress Wizard and Steve Agee voices Science Cat. Tunde Adebimpe, the lead singer from the band TV on the Radio, appears in "The Thin Yellow Line", voicing Banana Guard 16.

Various other characters are voiced by Tom Kenny, Dee Bradley Baker, Maria Bamford, Steve Little, Kent Osborne, and Melissa Villaseñor.

== Broadcast and reception ==
=== Broadcast ===
As with the sixth season, the seventh season of Adventure Time featured several "bomb weeks", where new episodes debuted each day. During the first of these, which ran from November 2–6, 2015, the episodes "Bonnie & Neddy" through "Football" aired. During the second week-long string of episodes, which ran from November 16–19, 2015, the eight-episode Stakes story-arc was aired as a miniseries. The third and final bomb started on January 11, 2016, with "Angel Face" and ended on January 15 with "King's Ransom".

=== Ratings ===
The season debuted on November 2, 2015, with the episode "Bonnie & Neddy". This episode was viewed by 1.07 million viewers and scored a 0.3 Nielsen rating in the 18- to 49-year-old demographic—meaning that it was seen by 0.3 percent of all households aged 18–49 who were watching television at the time. This marked a drop from the previous season finale, which was seen by 1.55 million viewers, and it marked a decrease of over two million viewers when compared with the previous season opener. Nevertheless, the miniseries Stakes saw an uptick in viewers, with the first two episodes scoring a 0.4 Nielsen rating in the 18- to 49-year-old demographic and being watched by 1.87 million viewers. During the week that Stakes aired, Adventure Time was able to hold a 0.4 Nielsen rating in the 18- to 49-year-old demographic and attain viewership numbers over 1.7 million for each episode. The season finale, "The Thin Yellow Line", was watched by 1.15 million viewers and scored a 0.28 Nielsen rating in the 18- to 49-year-old demographic, making it the lowest-rated season finale for the show at the time, and making the season as a whole the first in the series to fail to hit the two-million viewer mark for any episode.

=== Reviews and accolades ===
The A.V. Club writer Oliver Sava reviewed all of the episodes, grading each with a different letter grade; Stakes was collectively awarded a B, and the rest of the season received two C's, nine B's, and seven A's.

Stakes was met with mostly positive reviews. A wide variety of critics applauded the miniseries for its philosophical musings, with Charlie Jane Anders of io9 arguing that it is a meditation on the concept of change, and Heather Hogan of Autostraddle proposing that the miniseries is a commentary on depression. Many critics also applauded Sugar's song, "Everything Stays". Some critics, however, felt that the miniseries did not live up to expectations.

At the 68th Primetime Emmy Awards in 2016, the episode "The Hall of Egress" was nominated for a Short-format Animation. Herpich and Jason Kolowski each won a Primetime Emmy Award for Outstanding Individual Achievement in Animation, for their work on "Stakes Part 8: The Dark Cloud" and "Bad Jubies", respectively. In late 2016, "Bad Jubies" won an Annie Award for Best Animated Television/Broadcast Production for Children. Kirsten Lepore was nominated for Outstanding Achievement, Directing and Jason Kolowski was nominated for Outstanding Achievement, Production Design for this same episode.

== Episodes ==
No. overall	No. in season	Title	Supervising direction by	Written and storyboarded by	Original release date	Prod. code	US viewers (millions)
200	1	"Bonnie & Neddy"	Andres Salaff	Tom Herpich & Steve Wolfhard	November 2, 2015	1034-209	1.07
Finn and Jake explore a forbidden area under the Candy Kingdom for the King of Ooo. They discover a Candy Dragon, which the King of Ooo tries to monopolize as the source of all candy juice but scares it away. Finn and Jake enlist Bubblegum to help return the dragon, which she reveals is her shy and sensitive brother Neddy. Bubblegum finds Neddy, soothes him, and returns him to the Candy Kingdom after ensuring the King of Ooo cannot bother him again.
201	2	"Varmints"	Elizabeth Ito	Kris Mukai & Adam Muto	November 3, 2015	1034-208	1.31
Marceline visits the Candy Kingdom and is surprised that Bubblegum has been deposed. At Bubblegum's cabin, Bubblegum enlists Marceline's help in eliminating varmints that have been eating her pumpkins. They track the varmints and revisit an old mine tunnel which they frequented in their youth. The Queen Varmint proves too powerful for them to defeat, and Bubblegum admits that she misses the Candy Kingdom. Returning to the surface, Marceline promises to help Bubblegum defeat the Queen Varmint.
202	3	"Cherry Cream Soda"	Adam Muto	Graham Falk	November 4, 2015	1034-206	1.22
Cherry Cream Soda, now married to Starchy, is determined to put her past behind her and buries the remains of her previous husband, Root Beer Guy. However, a chance lightning strike revives him as Dirt Beer Guy. He tries to return to Cherry Cream Soda, who is terrified of his sudden return and newfound strength. After a talk with Jake, Dirt Beer Guy finds the resolve to rekindle his relationship with Cherry Cream Soda, but a jealous Starchy tries to kill him. Angered by Starchy's behavior, Cherry Cream Soda breaks up with Starchy and decides to start dating Dirt Beer Guy.
203	4	"Mama Said"	Elizabeth Ito	Kent Osborne & Kris Mukai	November 5, 2015	1034-218	1.16
The King of Ooo orders Finn and Jake to find a flying mushroom that he can ride. During their search, they encounter Canyon and accompany her to find a sacred spring. They are attacked by a giant flying mushroom, which Canyon defeats by turning the sacred spring's water into a blade to cut the mushroom apart. With no flying mushroom, Finn and Jake attempt to appease the King of Ooo with a mushroom pizza, but he fires them for their failure.
204	5	"Football"	Andres Salaff	Lyle Partridge & Luke Pearson	November 6, 2015	1034-207	1.26
BMO talks with Football, his reflection in the mirror, and agrees to switch places for a day. However, Football prefers the real world since the mirror world is empty and lonely, and reneges on the deal. Trapped, BMO haunts Football through reflective surfaces, and a terrified Football accidentally falls into a reflective pond, switching with BMO again. Football likes living in the pond, with the reflections of ducks to keep her company. BMO accepts an apology from Football and celebrates being back in the real world.
205	6	"Stakes Part 1: Marceline the Vampire Queen"	Andres Salaff	Jesse Moynihan & Ako Castuera	November 16, 2015	1034-212	1.87
Marceline asks Princess Bubblegum to cure her vampirism, as she no longer wants to be immortal. Bubblegum performs an experimental procedure to extract the vampiric essence from Marceline's body; as Marceline recovers, the extracted essence gains a will of its own and escapes. Meanwhile, Finn and Jake are called to investigate bloodsucking attacks on livestock; they discover Marceline's extracted essence is responsible, as it has transformed into a vampire. While Finn and Jake chase the vampire, a mob of angry villagers capture Marceline and leave her to be destroyed by the rising sun.
206	7	"Stakes Part 2: Everything Stays"	Elizabeth Ito	Hanna K. Nyström & Adam Muto	November 16, 2015	1034-213	1.87
While sunlight engulfs her, Marceline experiences flashbacks. She is comforted by her mother's lullaby as a child; witnesses Simon leaving her to protect her from himself; hunts vampires as a teenager and discovers she can absorb their powers. She befriends a tribe of Hyoomans, who are preparing to escape an impending catastrophe they fear will happen. Marceline helps fight more vampires, and tells the Hyoomans to flee when the Vampire King arrives. In the present, Marceline survives the sunlight, successfully cured of vampirism. Meanwhile, Jake encounters the vampires Marceline had previously killed, resurrected by her freed vampiric essence.
207	8	"Stakes Part 3: Vamps About"	Andres Salaff	Tom Herpich & Steve Wolfhard	November 17, 2015	1034-214	1.82
The five deadliest vampires resurface: the Vampire King, The Fool, The Empress, the Hierophant and the Moon. Surprised to be alive again, they disagree on what to do and go their separate ways. Witnessing this, Jake warns Finn and Marceline. Learning the Vampire King is alive, Marceline has a flashback of their previous battle—when the Vampire King sacrificed himself to bite Marceline, making her the last vampire. Marceline hunts and confronts the resurrected Vampire King, killing the Fool and reabsorbing his power of flight. However, the Vampire King warns her that the Empress is headed for the Ice Kingdom. Fearing for the Ice King's safety, Marceline leaves immediately.
208	9	"Stakes Part 4: The Empress Eyes"	Elizabeth Ito	Somvilay Xayaphone & Seo Kim	November 17, 2015	1034-215	1.82
The Empress arrives at the Ice Kingdom and uses her hypnotism power on the Ice King, who captures Finn for her. Marceline attacks and escapes with Finn, pursued by the Ice King. Marceline tries to jog the Ice King's memory, but it turns out he was never hypnotized and this is how he always acts around women. Marceline then attacks the Empress, who has the upper hand until she is paralyzed by a special gun Bubblegum developed. Marceline kills the Empress and reabsorbs her power of invisibility. She apologizes to her friends for trying to fight the vampires alone and tells them that they will hunt the remaining vampires together.
209	10	"Stakes Part 5: May I Come In?"	Adam Muto	Luke Pearson & Lyle Partridge	November 18, 2015	1034-216	1.85
While on the trail of the vampire known as the Moon, the group run into trouble when the shape-shifting Hierophant finds them. He proves to be too powerful to fight, so on learning that he cannot enter houses without permission, Jake shapeshifts into a house and the group take shelter inside. The Hierophant proposes joining forces against the Vampire King, and Marceline agrees on the condition that the Hierophant stops drinking blood. However, he attacks her and during the struggle, he is accidentally knocked into Jake and dies due to entering a house uninvited. Marceline reabsorbs his shapeshifting powers but then falls ill, having been poisoned by the Hierophant's stinger.
210	11	"Stakes Part 6: Take Her Back"	Andres Salaff	Jesse Moynihan & Ako Castuera	November 18, 2015	1034-217	1.85
Princess Bubblegum brings Marceline to the Candy Kingdom to work on a cure for the Hierophant's poison. Meanwhile, Finn and Jake find the Moon whose healing power might aid Marceline, but cannot kill the Moon because her healing powers are so great. The Moon awakens at sunset and Finn and Jake flee, luring the Moon to the Candy Kingdom. The Moon uses her powers to incapacitate Finn and Jake as she attempts to kill Marceline, but Peppermint Butler stabs the Moon in the back, her only weak spot. Marceline reabsorbs the Moon's healing power and fully recovers from the poison.
211	12	"Stakes Part 7: Checkmate"	Elizabeth Ito	Jesse Moynihan & Ako Castuera	November 19, 2015	1034-222	1.70
The group prepare to confront the Vampire King, who unexpectedly appears and says he no longer wishes to be a vampire. He maintains this, despite Marceline's attempts to attack him, and the group reluctantly agree to remove his vampiric essence. Bubblegum uses the same contraption she'd earlier used on Marceline, which turns the Vampire King into a relatively harmless lion, and puts his vampiric essence in a bucket. Bubblegum leaves Peppermint Butler to properly dispose of the essence but he trips, causing the essence to detonate into a new monstrosity: The Dark Cloud.
212	13	"Stakes Part 8: The Dark Cloud"	Andres Salaff	Tom Herpich & Steve Wolfhard	November 19, 2015	1034-219	1.70
The Dark Cloud moves towards the Candy Kingdom, pursued by Finn, Jake, and Bubblegum. Seeing Bubblegum fighting the Dark Cloud, the people of Candy Kingdom are inspired to overthrow the King of Ooo and join the battle. Marceline resigns herself to defeat until the Ice King instills in her a sense of purpose, convincing her it is her destiny to stop the Dark Cloud. Marceline eventually uses her demonic soul-sucking abilities to drain the Dark Cloud from the inside out. However, in doing so she once more becomes the Vampire Queen. In the aftermath, Marceline comes to terms with her vampiric nature, telling Bubblegum that her time as a mortal has made her more mature. Marceline sings a rendition of "Everything Stays", with short sequences of Ooo's return to normalcy.
213 214	14 15	"The More You Moe, the Moe You Know"	Andres Salaff Elizabeth Ito	Tom Herpich & Steve Wolfhard	December 3, 2015	1034-224 1034-228	1.20
A MO claiming to be Moe visits for BMO's birthday, bringing a special mission for the robot: return to the MO factory to grow up. BMO is nervous, worrying that the process of growing up may affect the way others see it. At the MO factory, BMO, after nearly falling into a trash compactor, learns that the real Moe went offline yesterday, and that the MO at the tree fort is actually AMO, the first MO ever created. AMO was built to receive love, and has become desperate for affection at any cost. Realizing that AMO has attempted to take its place and receive the love of Finn and Jake, BMO rushes back to the tree house, and in the resultant scuffle, AMO is accidentally hurled off a cliff.
215	16	"Summer Showers"	Elizabeth Ito	Graham Falk	January 7, 2016	1034-223	1.10
Jake's daughter, Viola, is up for the lead role in a play directed by Lumpy Space Princess, but is instead made responsible for sound and practical effects. Lumpy Space Princess treats her poorly and picks over details of reproducing raindrops. Viola puts up with this, wanting to make Jake proud. On opening night, the leading lady is unable to perform and Lumpy Space Princess decides to take her place, but at the last moment Viola teleports Lumpy Space Princess far away so she can assume the lead role. Lumpy Space Princess makes her way back, but her anger is soothed when she sees the raindrops Viola made for the play.
216	17	"Angel Face"	Elizabeth Ito	Somvilay Xayaphone & Seo Kim	January 11, 2016	1034-210	1.11
BMO sets up an elaborate cowboy-themed live-action role-play scenario. Using special "sentient sandwiches" as a bribe, BMO convinces Jake to take on the role of his horse, and the two set off to catch Finn, who is role-playing as an outlaw. Meanwhile, Me-Mow sees a pretend wanted poster that BMO made with Finn's picture on it, and she kidnaps Finn in the hopes of receiving an actual bounty. Finn escapes with the help of BMO and Jake, and they imprison Me-Mow deep inside the Candy Kingdom.
217	18	"President Porpoise Is Missing!"	Andres Salaff	Kent Osborne & Sam Alden	January 12, 2016	1034-211	1.21
While playing video games in their treehouse, Finn and Jake learn that President Porpoise is missing. They decide to find Banana Man for help, and are surprised that Banana Man and the Ice King were already there, listening. Finn and Jake enlist BMO to distract the Ice King, while they travel with Banana Man to the bottom of the sea in Banana Man's submarine. Finn and Jake interrogate Vice President Blowfish but are unsuccessful at getting information. At the last moment before Blowfish takes over as President of the Ocean, President Porpoise returns, explaining that he had taken a long weekend.
218	19	"Blank-Eyed Girl"	Andres Salaff	Somvilay Xayaphone & Seo Kim	January 13, 2016	1034-220	1.12
Finn and Jake are confronted by the urban myth of the Blank-Eyed Girl, creatures who hide in all corners of Ooo and unnervingly stare at people for no reason. Finn and Jake are terrified and try to fight off the Blank-Eyed Girls with various superstitions. When this fails, they try to ignore the Blank-Eyed Girls, but Jake breaks down at their creepiness. Eventually, the creatures reveal that they are formless creatures in disguise, and they leave the tree house through an open window.
219	20	"Bad Jubies"	Kirsten Lepore^{g}	Kirsten Lepore	January 14, 2016	1034-205	1.22
A deadly storm hits the grasslands, forcing Finn, Jake, BMO, and Lumpy Space Princess to build a bunker. Jake appears to do nothing while the others collect necessities, angering them. In the end, it is revealed that Jake was collecting sounds; as the storm threatens to destroy the group's bunker, Jake uses a beat box of these sounds to calm the storm.
220	21	"King's Ransom"	Adam Muto	Andres Salaff & Hanna K. Nyström	January 15, 2016	1034-221	1.12
The Ice King enlists Finn and Jake to recover his stolen crown and Gunter the penguin. After several wasted efforts involving foxes and fake crowns, they learn that Gunter and the real crown have been taken to a mysterious cave. The Ice King goes alone and meets Betty, who used Gunter's innate demon powers to manipulate the circuitry of the crown for unknown purposes. As the Ice King is reunited with the ice crown and Gunter, Betty disappears.
221	22	"Scamps"	Elizabeth Ito	Kent Osborne & Somvilay Xayaphone	January 21, 2016	1034-225	1.45
After foiling a scam perpetrated by a group of at-risk candy kids, Finn takes the youths on a camping trip in an attempt to reform them. Initially, the kids are unable to give up their immoral ways, but Finn uses reverse psychology to convince the kids to do what he wants them to do. In the end, the children enroll in school to better themselves.
222	23	"Crossover"	Andres Salaff	Sam Alden & Jesse Moynihan	January 28, 2016	1034-226	1.13
Finn and Jake cross over into Farmworld—the alternate dimension that was first created in the episode "Finn the Human"—to stop Farmworld-Finn and the Jake-Lich from using an alternate version of the Enchiridion to open doorways into all dimensions. After a long and drawn-out battle, Finn, Jake, and Ice Finn team up to stop the Jake-Lich. Finn and Jake are then able to use a magical device provided by Prismo to remove the essence of the Lich from Farmworld-Jake, returning Farmworld to normal.
223	24	"The Hall of Egress"	Andres Salaff	Tom Herpich	March 5, 2016	1034-227	1.24
Finn and Jake set out to find a dungeon, but Finn ends up getting trapped within. In the center of the structure he finds a door; when he closes his eyes, he is able to pass through. Beyond the door is a maze, and past the maze is the outside world. However, if Finn opens his eyes, he is transported back to the door. At first, Finn tries to live his life blindfolded, but he is always forced to open his eyes. He eventually wanders into an identical dungeon, in the center of which is a door that he can only pass through by opening his eyes. In so doing, Finn manages to escape.
224	25	"Flute Spell"	Andres Salaff	Jesse Moynihan & Sam Alden	March 12, 2016	1034-231	1.01
Huntress Wizard seeks Finn's flute-playing skills to summon the Spirit of the Forest. Jake suspects that Finn has feelings for Huntress Wizard, but Finn adamantly denies it. After drinking from a magic spring, Finn briefly interacts with the Spirit, but it is only by playing together that the two are able to summon the Spirit on the material plane. Asked what he was thinking about to allow the summoning to work, Finn confesses that he was thinking of Huntress Wizard. Huntress Wizard likewise admits that she was thinking of Finn; the two kiss, but realize they cannot be with one another.
225	26	"The Thin Yellow Line"	Adam Muto	Lyle Partridge & KC Green	March 19, 2016	1034-233	1.15
Princess Bubblegum orders Finn and Jake to infiltrate the banana guard and find a rogue guard who has been painting murals on Candy Kingdom property. Banana Guard 16 is responsible, having run out of space in his hidden art studio. He fears revealing that he is a painter because Bubblegum terrifies him. However, Bubblegum explains that she wanted to hire him to paint an official mural in one of her halls.

- ^g Guest director

== Home media ==
On January 19, 2016, Warner Home Video released Stakes in its entirety on DVD. The DVD release Card Wars (2016) also contains several seventh-season episodes. These DVD release can be purchased on the Cartoon Network Shop, and the individual episodes can be downloaded from both the iTunes Store and Amazon.com.

=== Full season release ===
The full season set was released on DVD on July 18, 2017. The seventh season was not released on Blu-ray in Region 1, making it the first Adventure Time season to not receive this treatment.

Adventure Time: The Complete Seventh Season
Set details
Special features
- 26 episodes
  - 2-disc set (DVD)
  - 1-disc set (Blu-ray)
- 1.78:1 aspect ratio
- Subtitles: English
- English (Dolby Stereo)
- Minisodes
- Song demos
- Animatics
- Art galleries
- "Good Jubies: The Making of Bad Jubies" featurette
- "Behind the Title Card" featurette
Release dates
Region 1
Region 4
Region A
Region B
July 18, 2017
November 22, 2017
n/a
November 22, 2017
