= Finn the Human and Jake the Dog =

"Finn the Human" and "Jake the Dog"
- Adventure Time episodes
- Title Card for Finn the Human
- Episode nos.: Season 5 Episodes 1 & 2
- Directed by: Larry Leichliter (Note: Director); Nate Cash (Note: Supervising director, "Finn the Human"); Adam Muto (Note: Supervising director, "Jake the Dog"); Nick Jennings (Note: Art director)
- Written by: Tom Herpich (Note: Storyboard artist, "Finn the Human"); Jesse Moynihan; Cole Sanchez (Note: Storyboard artist, "Jake the Dog"); Rebecca Sugar
- Story by: Patrick McHale; Kent Osborne; Pendleton Ward
- Production codes: 1014-105; 1014-106
- Original air date: November 12, 2012
- Running time: 11 minutes

Guest appearances
- Ron Perlman as The Lich; Kumail Nanjiani as Prismo; Ming-Na Wen as Farmworld Finn's mother; Cloris Leachman as Farmworld Marceline; James Kyson as Big Destiny, Trami; Eric Bauza as Tromo; Jeff Bennett as Choose Bruce

Episode chronology
| ← Previous "The Lich" | Next → "Five More Short Graybles" |
- Adventure Time season 5

"Finn the Human" and "Jake the Dog" are the first two episodes of the fifth season of the American animated television series Adventure Time. "Finn the Human" was written and storyboarded by Tom Herpich and Jesse Moynihan, whereas "Jake the Dog" was written and storyboarded by Cole Sanchez and Rebecca Sugar. The stories for both episodes were developed by Patrick McHale, Kent Osborne, and Pendleton Ward. It originally aired on Cartoon Network on November 12, 2012. The episodes guest star Ron Perlman as the Lich, Kumail Nanjiani as Prismo, Ming-Na Wen as Farmworld Finn's mother, Cloris Leachman as Farmworld Marceline, James Kyson as Big Destiny & Trami, Eric Bauza as Tromo, and Jeff Bennett as Choose Bruce.

The series follows the adventures of Finn (voiced by Jeremy Shada), a human boy, and his best friend and adoptive brother Jake (voiced by John DiMaggio), a dog with magical powers to change shape and grow and shrink at will. In this episode, Finn and Jake chase The Lich through a dimensional portal where they meet Prismo, a wish granter, who tells them that the Lich wished for the extinction of all life. This leads Finn to wish that the Lich had never existed. Finn is then transported to an alternate timeline, where he is a normal human living with his family and his dog, Jake, on a farm. In the alternate reality, Finn discovers a magical ice crown, which he attempts to use to repay his family's debt. After placing it on his head, he is magically imbued with power over ice and snow. Prismo tells Jake that if he can change The Lich's original wish, everything will go back to normal. Jake—with help from Prismo—eventually wishes that the Lich had actually desired for Finn and Jake to return home. Thus, the world is righted again.

Both "Finn the Human" and "Jake the Dog" are a continuation of the fourth season finale "The Lich". Because "Finn the Human" and "Jake the Dog" were being worked on by four separate storyboardists, they coordinated their ideas so that the resultant two products would work together. The resulting episodes were collectively watched by 3.435 million viewers and received critical acclaim, with writers from The A.V. Club and IndieWire applauding the episodes for being both an excellent season premiere, as well as being refreshing and creative.

== Plot ==
=== "Finn the Human" ===
In the fourth season finale "The Lich", Finn and Jake are tricked by the Lich—disguised as their hero Billy—into opening a portal to the multiverse by using the Enchiridion. After the Lich passes through, Finn and Jake give chase. They eventually reach a time room at the center of the multiverse that is inhabited by Prismo, a wish-granter. They arrive just in time to see the Lich vanish after making his wish for the extinction of all life. After a short conversation with Prismo, Finn wishes that the Lich had never existed and is promptly transported into the reality created by his wish.

The scene then shifts to the art style featured in the end of "The Lich", as part of the wish-created reality—known as "Farmworld"—in which Finn is a normal human living with his family and his dog, Jake, on a farm. Picking up from the last scene from "The Lich", Finn is called by his mother and told to sell his beloved mule Bartram to pay off the family's debt to the Destiny Gang. While going to town to the sell the creature, Finn and Jake fall down an opening in the earth and discover the long-dead skeleton of Simon Petrikov. An aged and decrepit Marceline—who never became a vampire—reveals herself and tells Finn that Simon gave his life stopping a mutagenic bomb from exploding by freezing it in ice. She tells them that she has been guarding Simon's body, and the ice crown, ever since his demise so that no one is ever harmed from the crown's power.

Finn manages to steal the crown, hoping to sell it instead of Bartram. In town, however, the Destiny Gang steal the crown as well as Bartram. Finn, furious, riles up the town, who begin to riot, as they are sick of being abused by the Destiny Gang. Finn goes to the Destiny Gang's mansion to confront their leader, Big Destiny. Once there, Big Destiny returns the crown, noting that it is the last possession that he will ever own. Finn looks out the window and sees that the gang is burning the city. Finn races to his home, taking Marceline with him. When he arrives at his house, the gang has already set it on fire with his parents and infant sibling trapped upstairs. Finn asks Marceline if the crown is magic and she tells him it is very dangerous magic. He then puts the crown on his head, and the power begins to flow through him.

=== "Jake the Dog" ===
Title Card of Jake the Dog

After putting on the crown, Finn becomes corrupted by its power, going mad. He attacks the Destiny Gang—who his family owed a debt as established in the previous episode—and put out the fires that they started, but his uncontrolled power causes the mutagenic bomb that Simon stopped to explode, destroying the surrounding area. Jake, however, falls into a mutagenic puddle and is mutated into a creature similar to the Lich, which attacks Finn.

In the Time Room, Prismo explains to Jake about Finn being transported to a separate and altered world based on his wish. Together, they watch the events in Finn's world on Prismo's television and Prismo asks Jake what he would like to wish for. Jake wishes for a sandwich, but Prismo urges him to consider using his wish on something important, such as helping Finn. Jake tells Prismo he will use it when he knows Finn will be in real danger, and after a conversation, the two decide to hang out; Prismo mutes the TV and the two begin to ignore the events happening in Finn's timeline.

Eventually, the Cosmic Owl joins Prismo and Jake, and the two chat in a hot tub. While reaching for chips, the Cosmic Owl unmutes the TV, and Jake realizes that Finn is in trouble. Prismo explains that Jake can still save Finn by using his wish, but reveals that his wish must be very specific, as Prismo's wishes have a tendency to have a monkey's paw—an ironic twist—connected to them. After coaching by Prismo, Jake wishes that the Lich's original wish had been for Finn and Jake to return home. Prismo grants the wish and Finn and Jake are indeed transported back to Ooo. Finn has no recollection of his time in the alternate reality, but Jake does.

== Production ==
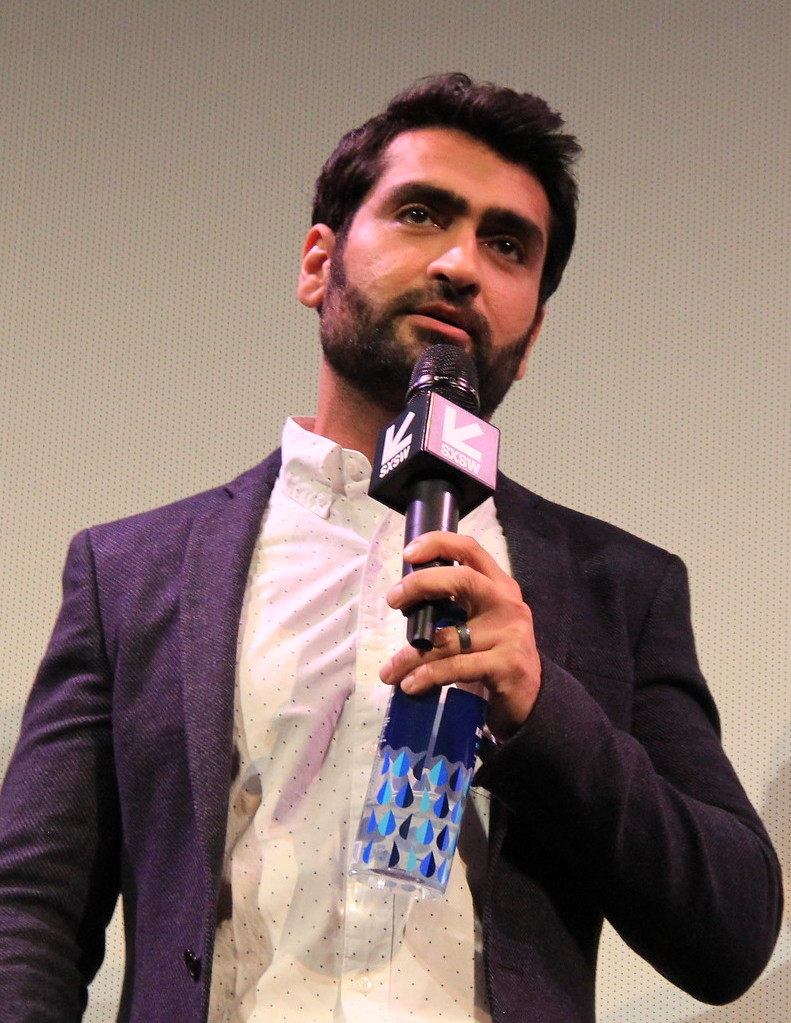
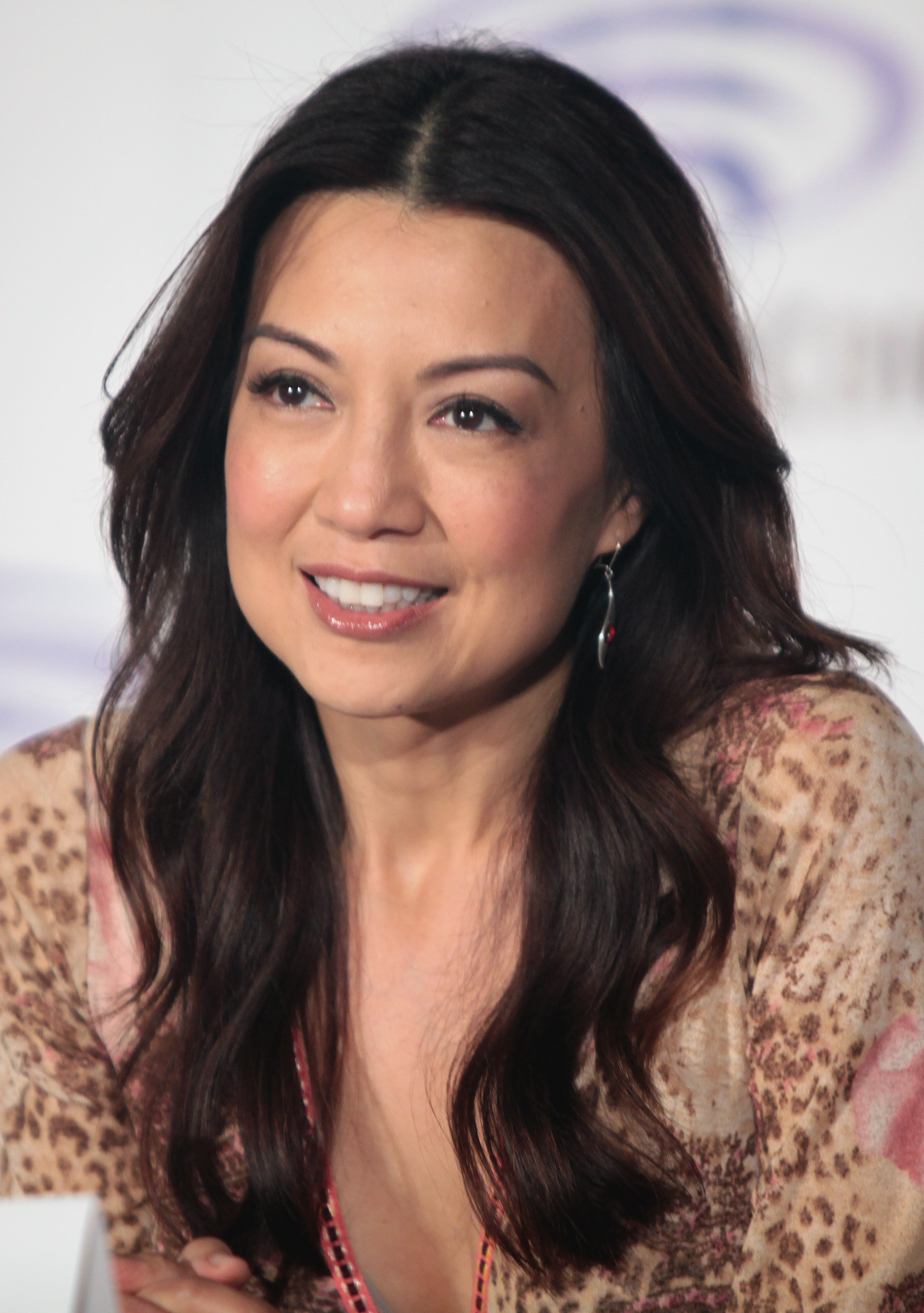
The episode guest starred Kumail Nanjiani (left) and Ming-Na Wen (right) among others.

"Finn the Human" was written and storyboarded by Jesse Moynihan and Tom Herpich, whereas "Jake the Dog" was written and storyboarded by Rebecca Sugar and Cole Sanchez. The stories for both episodes were developed by Patrick McHale, Kent Osborne, Pendleton Ward. The two episodes were directed by Larry Leichliter, with Nick Jennings serving as the show's art director. Nate Cash served as the supervising director for "Finn the Human" and Adam Muto served as supervising director for "Jake the Dog". Despite "Finn the Human" being officially storyboarded by Moynihan & Herpich, and "Jake the Dog" being officially storyboarded Cole Sanchez & Rebecca Sugar, the four writers and storyboarders collaborated amongst themselves. For instance, the majority of the scenes with Prismo were created by Sanchez and Herpich, whereas "Finn going insane" was the product of Sugar.

The two episodes guest star Ron Perlman as the Lich, Kumail Nanjiani as Prismo, Ming-Na Wen as Farmworld Finn's mother, Cloris Leachman as Farmworld Marceline, James Kyson as Big Destiny & Trami, Eric Bauza as Tromo, and Jeff Bennett as Choose Bruce. Kyson and Bauza's characters, the Destiny Gang, were designed to not "really fit in the Adventure Time world". Moynihan designed the characters, basing their look at least partially on characters from the Japanese manga series Fist of the North Star. On his website, he expressed his fear that their appearance would be "a little bit jarring", but he was not dissuaded from trying it.

The music for these episodes was composed by Tim Kiefer. To create the song "Prismatic", Kiefer took the song "Lil' Booty Dance", first heard in the second season episode "Mortal Recoil" and remixed it so that it would fit with the theme of "inter-dimensional travel" present in the episode. Kiefer explained, "I threw my own music from the Season 2 finale 'Mortal Folly / Mortal Recoil' on my turntables and went wild – pitching, reversing, rewinding, scratching and more – transforming Jake’s 'Lil’ Booty Dance' bongo song into a booming, merry-go-round dance celebration."

== Reception ==
"Finn the Human" and "Jake the Dog" first aired on Cartoon Network on November 12, 2012. The episodes were collectively watched by 3.435 million viewers, and scored a 0.7 percent in the 18–49 demographic Nielsen household rating. Nielsen ratings are audience measurement systems that determine the audience size and composition of television programming in the United States, which means that the episodes were seen by 0.7 percent of all 18- to 49-year-olds watching television at the time of the airing. The episodes first saw physical release as part of the 2014 Finn the Human DVD, which included 16 episodes from the series' first, third, fourth, fifth, and sixth seasons.

Oliver Sava of The A.V. Club awarded the two episodes an "A−". He noted that, together, both episodes come together to make "a dense première that evokes nearly all aspects of this series." He was appreciative of the fact that "Finn the Human" was "an action-packed, mythology-heavy chapter" and a "nice change of pace". Likewise, he wrote that "Jake the Dog" focused "on humor and relationships", and had various "irreverent silly note[s]" that helped balance the episode's more serious story line.

Eric Kohn of IndieWire praised the episodes for being "irreverent and narratively engaging". He called the collective episodes "the ideal testament to animation's glorious pliability in an commercial arena otherwise defined by restrictions." Kohn felt that the show's exploration of "sad subtext"—such as the series' mysterious Mushroom War and the relationship between Marceline and the Ice King—and the characters' abilities to "deny the bad vibes their surrounding world invites" via "cheery songs and vibrant artwork" were some of the series' strongest points. Finally, he praised the exploration of the multiverse and its impact on the show, noting that it was an "interesting creative challenge".
