= Beyond This Earthly Realm =

- Adventure Time episode
- Episode no.: Season 4 Episode 11
- Directed by: Larry Leichliter (Note: Director); Nate Cash (Note: Creative director); Nick Jennings (Note: Art director)
- Written by: Ako Castuera; Jesse Moynihan
- Story by: Patrick McHale; Kent Osborne; Pendleton Ward
- Production code: 1008-087
- Original air date: June 11, 2012
- Running time: 11 minutes

Episode chronology
← Previous "Goliad"	Next → "Gotcha!"
- Adventure Time season 4

"Beyond This Earthly Realm" is the eleventh episode of the fourth season of the American animated television series Adventure Time. The episode was written and storyboarded by Ako Castuera and Jesse Moynihan, from a story by Patrick McHale, Kent Osborne, and Pendleton Ward. It originally aired on Cartoon Network on June 11, 2012.

The series follows the adventures of Finn (voiced by Jeremy Shada), a human boy, and his best friend and adoptive brother Jake (voiced by John DiMaggio), a dog with magical powers to change shape and grow and shrink at will. In this episode, Finn is transported to the spirit world after he finds and touches a porcelain lamb. Only the Ice King can help get him out.

The episode was written to expand upon the idea of the Ice King's wizard eyes, which were introduced in the second season episode "Mortal Recoil". "Beyond This Earthly Realm" received moderately positive critical reviews, with Oliver Sava of The A.V. Club calling it an average episode for the series.

== Plot ==
While exploring an abandoned mine shaft in a mysterious cave, Finn and Jake discover a porcelain lamb. After touching the object, Finn is transported to the spiritual plane, filled with grotesque and strange spirits. In this new dimension, Finn is unable to make contact, either physically or vocally, with Jake. After unsuccessfully trying to communicate with Jake, Finn makes a snide comment to the Ice King, who, much to Finn's surprise, can see and hear him; the Ice King explains that, because of his "wizard eyes", he is able to see spirits. The Ice King and Finn soon make a deal: Finn will help rid the Ice King of the strange spirits that plague his palace, and the Ice King will give Finn the secret to return to the physical plane.

Finn rids Ice King's palace of the spiritual creatures, but soon learns that the Ice King never planned on helping Finn in the first place. After threatening to unleash the spirits, Finn manages to secure the Ice King's help; the two head to the tree fort to destroy the porcelain lamb. However, Jake misinterprets the Ice King's motives, thinking that he wants to imprison Finn forever. In the ensuing struggles, the Ice King touches the object and is transported to the spiritual plane. Eventually, Ice King and Finn manage to manifest themselves on the physical plane by focusing their spiritual energies. The two manage to knock over the lamb, destroying it. Finn and the Ice King are thus returned to the physical plane.

== Production ==
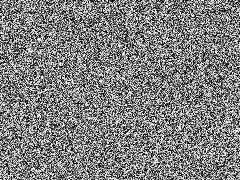
Some fans of the series felt that Ice King addressing the television static was an example of the characters breaking the fourth wall.

"Beyond This Earthly Realm" was written and storyboarded by Ako Castuera and Jesse Moynihan, from a story developed by series creator Pendleton Ward, Patrick McHale, and Kent Osborne. The episode was directed by Larry Leichliter. The episode was written to expand upon the idea of the Ice King's wizard eyes, which were introduced in the second season episode "Mortal Recoil"; in said episode, wizard eyes were developed as a mechanism to justify how the Ice King saw the Lich possess Bubblegum. The beginning of the episode highlighted Castuera's storyboarding idiosyncrasies, with Tom Herpich specifically highlighting Castuera's use of three arms for Jake. Ward was responsible for the abrupt ending, featuring Finn, Jake, and Ice King all laughing; he later noted that he was "not proud" of it.

The scene featuring Ice King delivering a soliloquy about the nature of televisions and static was Moynihan's attempt at being introspective. Fans of the series later took the scene to be an example of the characters breaking the fourth wall, which Moynihan disputes. The spirits in the episode were designed by Andy Ristaino and Michael DeForge. Fellow storyboard artist Cole Sanchez provided the voice for the heads of one of the demons.

== Reception ==
"Beyond this Earthly Realm" aired on Cartoon Network on June 11, 2012. The episode first saw physical release as part of the 2014 DVD, The Suitor, which included 16 episodes from the series' first five seasons. It was later re-released as part of the complete fourth season DVD in October 2014.

Oliver Sava of The A.V. Club awarded the episode a "B", noting that it was a "bit of a step down" when compared with the preceding episode, "Goliad". Due to the fact that the episode's main storylines are similar to plots that the series had done before, Sava felt that "this week’s episode doesn’t feel as fresh as the rest of this season’s output [but] even an average episode of Adventure Time is going to be on the stronger side". Nevertheless, he applauded both the series' "grotesque" character design, as well as the Ice King's material, writing that "Tom Kenny does some amazing voicework this episode, whether he’s voicing his hatred for the shit-vomiting spirits that infest Ice King’s castle or shrieking when he thinks his body is being touched." Sava concluded that "even if the story isn’t the most imaginative or wacky," the episode was still enjoyable.
