= It Came from the Nightosphere =

- Adventure Time episode
- Hunson Abadeer reveals his demonic form. The artistic design caused an issue with Cartoon Network, because they felt that it initially resembled human genitalia.
- Episode no.: Season 2 Episode 1
- Directed by: Larry Leichliter (Note: Director); Patrick McHale (Note: Creative director); Nick Jennings (Note: Art director)
- Written by: Adam Muto; Rebecca Sugar
- Story by: Merriwether Williams; Steve Little; Patrick McHale; Pendleton Ward; Thurop Van Orman
- Production code: 1002-029
- Original air date: October 11, 2010
- Running time: 11 minutes

Guest appearance
- Martin Olson as Hunson Abadeer

Episode chronology
← Previous "The Gut Grinder"	Next → "The Eyes"
- Adventure Time season 2

"It Came from the Nightosphere" is the first episode of the second season of the American animated television series Adventure Time. The series follows the adventures of Finn (voiced by Jeremy Shada), a human boy, and his best friend and adoptive brother Jake (voiced by John DiMaggio), a dog with magical powers to change shape and grow and shrink at will. In this episode, Finn releases Marceline's dad (voiced by Martin Olson) from the Nightosphere after Marceline (voiced by Olivia Olson) sings a song about the relationship between her and her estranged father. However, Finn—begrudgingly aided by an enraged Marceline—is forced to stop him from stealing all the souls in Ooo.

Based on a story by Merriwether Williams, Steve Little, Patrick McHale, Pendleton Ward, and Thurop Van Orman, "It Came from the Nightosphere" was written and storyboarded by Adam Muto and Rebecca Sugar. This episode—which was the first one that Sugar worked on as a storyboard artist—features a song that she wrote entitled "The Fry Song", which would later go on to be very popular with the show's fanbase. The episode also guest stars Martin Olson as Marceline the Vampire Queen's father Hunson Abadeer. Olson would reprise his role in the series' third, fourth, and tenth seasons.

"It Came from the Nightosphere" originally aired on Cartoon Network on October 11, 2010. The episode was watched by 2.001 million people on its debut and received largely positive critical attention. At the 2011 Primetime Emmy Awards, the episode was nominated for Outstanding Short-format Animated Program, although the episode did not win. The episode was later released on the eponymous compilation DVD on March 6, 2012, before it was re-released as part of the complete second season DVD/Blu-ray set on June 4, 2013.

== Plot ==
After Finn agrees to help Marceline record one of her musical compositions, she begins to sing "The Fry Song"—a tune about the rift between herself and her father, Hunson Abadeer. (Note: "It Came from the Nightosphere" does not reveal Abadeer's name, with characters merely referring to him as "Marceline's Dad". His full name would not be revealed until in the two-part fourth-season episode "Return to the Nightosphere"/"Daddy's Little Monster". According to Moynihan, the name was inspired by the name that his brother Justin had given their family's car when they were growing up. The two later used it for a band that only recorded one song.) Finn, feeling sorry for her, decides to summon her father from the hellish Nightosphere, failing to realize that her father is the domain's dark leader and that he consumes souls. He materializes before Marceline and Finn, attempts to kill Finn by devouring his soul, and successfully steals Marceline's axe bass. Finn and Marceline give chase.

Marceline's father moves throughout Ooo, consuming the souls of all living creatures that he can find. Finn and Marceline first try to crush him with a rock, but the resulting skirmish between father and daughter merely infuriates Hunson Abadeer. He assumes that Marceline is trying to kill him to take over the Nightosphere, but she merely wants her bass guitar back.

Finn and Marceline attempt one last time to stop Hunson Abadeer, who has now grown huge. Due to his size, Finn is easily defeated. Marceline, infuriated by her father's lack of understanding, storms off. Finn, in a last-ditch effort to save the day, plays back the recording of "The Fry Song". Suddenly, Marceline's father understands why she is upset, and the two reconnect. Finn uses this beat as an opportunity to cut all of the souls free from Hunson Abadeer's "soul sack" before banishing him back to the Nightosphere.

== Production ==
=== Storyboarding and design ===
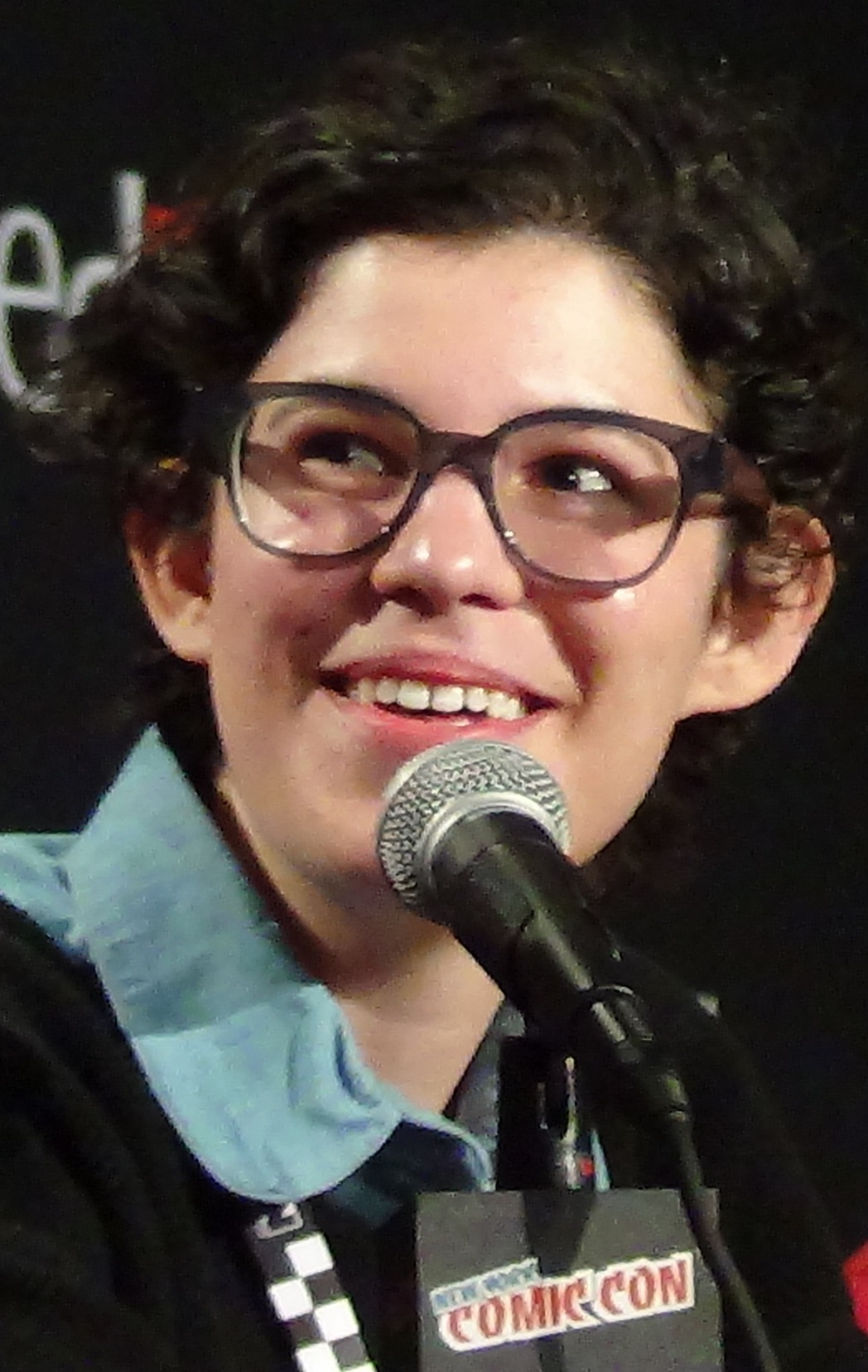
The episode was the first to be written and storyboarded by Rebecca Sugar.

"It Came from the Nightosphere" was written and storyboarded by Adam Muto and Rebecca Sugar, from a story by Merriwether Williams, Steve Little, Patrick McHale, Pendleton Ward, and Thurop Van Orman. The episode was directed by Larry Leichliter, with Patrick McHale serving as the episode's creative director and Nick Jennings serving as the episode's art director. The episode was the third episode of the season produced, but was chosen to be the first aired. When the network announced the start of season two, the episode was not finished.

"It Came from the Nightosphere" was the first episode storyboarded by Sugar; according to her, she "did all the monster stuff at the end", whereas Muto "did all the meat in the middle". She later joked that "anything that is actually witty was done by Adam. I’m usually responsible for sex jokes and violence." During the storyboarding process, Sugar and Muto were running low on time, and so the latter asked fellow series artist Jesse Moynihan if he could help storyboard the initial fight between Marceline and her father. The final scene with Abadeer, which featured Finn cutting open his "soul sack" was added by Sugar based on a drawing by Ward that featured Finn flying through the air with two swords. However, she was not sure if the scene would make it into the final product due to its violent nature. In fact, due to the darker and somewhat scary tone of "It Came from the Nightosphere", the Frederator creative developer Eric Homan warned potential watchers through a blog post that the episode might not be suitable for younger children.

The episode prominently features "The Fry Song", a song co-written by Ward and Sugar. This song was Sugar's first for the series, and it would go on to become popular with the fanbase of Adventure Time. Sugar's original version was inspired by Broadway theatre and was more sombre. Ward helped Sugar add more jokes to the final version. During the network pitch of the episode, Ward and Sugar performed the song for network executives, with the former beatboxing and the latter singing and playing ukulele. Although the pitch went over well and the episode was greenlit, Sugar later called the experience "super terrifying".

The design for Abadeer's monster form caused issues with the series' standards and practices department. The initial designs were deemed "too vagina-like", and the network made the show redesign the character. However, during the second submission, the network felt that it looked "too much like a penis". Ward later expressed his incredulousness on the commentary track for "It Came from the Nightosphere", saying, "We were just like, 'What is happening? This is a monster, with just a crazy, weird face.'"

=== Voice acting ===
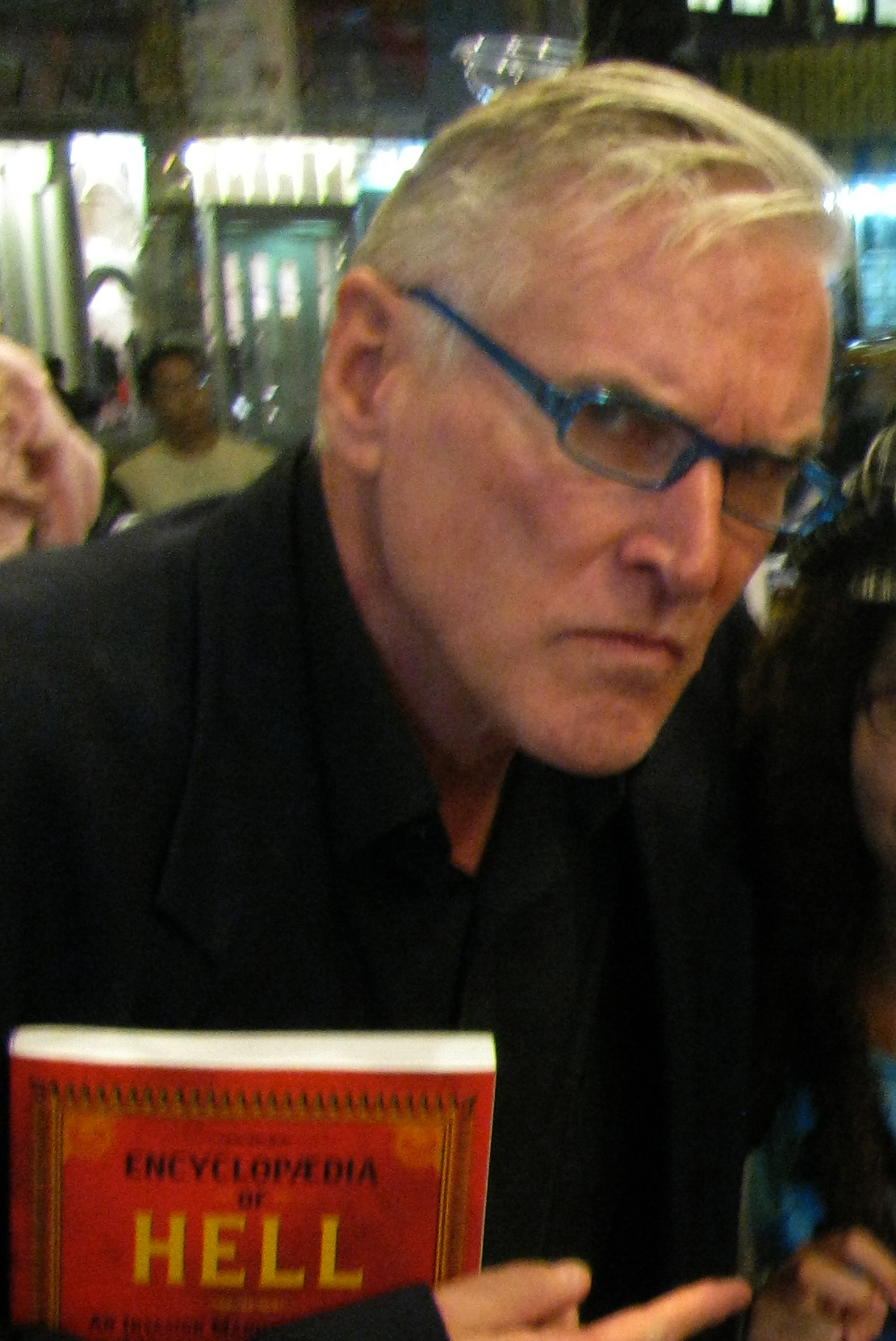
The episode guest stars Martin Olson, who voices Marceline's father, Hunson Abadeer.

Martin Olson, the father of Olivia Olson who voices Marceline, provides the voice for Marceline's demonic father Hunson Abadeer. A year after the series had been cast, Ward approached Olson and asked him if he wanted to voice a character on the show. Olson was apprehensive at first, arguing that he was not an actor but a writer, instead. Ward insisted and Olson eventually relented. Olson later joked that he was "in heaven" during the recording of the dialogue because the episode featured him "fighting to the death with [his] daughter." Olivia later noted that the opportunity to voice act with her father was "pretty cool”. Martin Olson would make a cameo in the third-season episode "Memory of a Memory", and would be featured in major roles in the fourth-season two-part episode "Return to the Nightosphere"/"Daddy's Little Monster", and the tenth-season episode "Marcy & Hunson".

== Reception ==
"It Came from the Nightosphere" first aired on Cartoon Network on October 11, 2010. The episode was viewed by 2.001 million viewers and scored a Nielsen rating of 1.3/2 percent. This means it was seen by 1.3 percent of all households and 2 percent of all households watching television at the time of the episode's airing. This marked a decline from the first season premiere, which had been viewed by 2.5 million viewers, but it marked an increase from the first season finale, which was watched by only 1.77 million viewers. "It Came from the Nightosphere" also marked gains when compared to the same timeslot a year prior; for instance, 732,000 kids aged 6–11 watched the episode, an increase by 35 percent when compared to the previous year.

"It Came from the Nightosphere" was highly praised by critics. Tyler Foster of DVD Talk called it "a pretty decent example of all the notes the show can hit." He was particularly pleased with the way "the rift between Marceline and her dad is handled with a nice seriousness that fits right in alongside absurd gags about penguins". He also noted that "any episode that includes a song is a plus in my book." It was also called the "real highlight" of the eponymous DVD release by Charles Webb of MTV Geek. IGN writer Matt Fowler later referred to the episode as a "classic". In a separate review, he later wrote that the episode "has come to represent the best of Adventure Time, and Marceline's [sic], with her angst-y anti-daddy song and her Freddy Krueger-esque sweater has launched a thousand cosplays." Writers of Spin ranked "The Fry Song" as the forty-fourth best original song performed by fictional characters in any medium. James Grebey called its subject matter deep and from a place of uncontrolled emotion, and characterized it as mature but also eccentric.

Ward was very happy with the episode. He complimented storyboard artists Muto and Sugar, saying that the former "has a hilarious slapstick set-up-the-punchline kind of style of comedy" and the latter "is amazing at executing these super romantic, emotional goosebump-kind of feelings". He was particularly pleased with the ending, noting that "I love that goose-bumps feeling in a climactic scene with music rising. In that episode you're talking about, there is that rising action toward the end, and then LSP […] cuts in and says 'drama bomb!' in the middle of it to sort of, like, cut its legs out. Which I think is a lot of fun."

"It Came from the Nightosphere" was later nominated for a 2011 Primetime Emmy Award for Outstanding Short-format Animated Program, although it did not win.

== Media release ==
=== "It Came from the Nightosphere" DVD release ===
The episode first saw physical release as part of the eponymous 2012 It Came From the Nightosphere DVD, which included 16 episodes from the series' first three seasons.

It Came from the Nightosphere DVD
Set details
Special features
- 16 episodes
- 1-disc set
- 1.78:1 aspect ratio
- Subtitles: English
- English (Dolby Stereo)
- "Little Did You Know" gallery
Release date
Region 1
March 6, 2012

=== Other releases ===
"It Came from the Nightosphere" was later re-released as part of the complete second season DVD/Blu-ray set on June 4, 2013. In addition, the 2015 limited edition 12" vinyl record release Marceline the Vampire Queen – Rock the Nightosphere included "The Fry Song" alongside other songs sung by Marceline.
