= Adventure Time season 2 =

Adventure Time
- Season 2
- DVD cover
- Showrunner: Pendleton Ward
- Starring: Jeremy Shada; John DiMaggio
- No. of episodes: 26

Release
- Original network: Cartoon Network
- Original release: October 11, 2010 – May 9, 2011

Season chronology
- ← Previous; Season 1 Next → Season 3

The second season of Adventure Time, an American animated television series created by Pendleton Ward, premiered on Cartoon Network on October 11, 2010, and concluded on May 2, 2011. The season follows the adventures of Finn, a human boy, and his best friend and adoptive brother Jake, a dog with magical powers to change shape and size at will. Finn and Jake live in the post-apocalyptic Land of Ooo, where they interact with the other main characters of the show: Princess Bubblegum, The Ice King, Marceline the Vampire Queen, Lumpy Space Princess, and BMO.

After the first, the second season of Adventure Time was quickly ordered by Cartoon Network. However, the beginning of the series debuted under production constraints, and "It Came from the Nightosphere" aired after just barely being finished.

The first episode of the season, "It Came from the Nightosphere" was watched by 2.001 million viewers; this marked a decrease in viewers watching Cartoon Network when compared to the previous season's debut, although it marked an increase when compared to the last season's finale. The season ended with the episode "Heat Signature" on May 9, 2011. It was viewed by 1.975 million viewers, which marked an increase from the first-season finale. The season was initially supposed to end with the cliffhanger two-parter "Mortal Folly"/"Mortal Recoil." Still, due to a scheduling error, "Heat Signature" was the last episode to air for the season. In 2011, Adventure Time was nominated for an Annie Award, and the episode "It Came from the Nightosphere" was nominated for a Primetime Emmy Award for Outstanding Short-format Animated Program. Neither the series nor the episode won, however. Several compilation DVDs that contained episodes from the season were released after the season finished airing. The complete season set was released on June 4, 2013, on DVD and Blu-ray.

== Development ==
=== Concept ===
The season follows the adventures of Finn the Human, a human boy, and his best friend Jake, a dog with magical powers to change shape and grow and shrink at will. Finn and Jake live in the post-apocalyptic Land of Ooo, wherein they interact with the other major characters, including Princess Bubblegum, The Ice King, Marceline the Vampire Queen, Lumpy Space Princess, and BMO. Common storylines revolve around: Finn and Jake discovering strange creatures, battling the Ice King, and battling monsters to help others. Various other episodes deal with Finn attempting to understand his attraction towards Bubblegum. Two of the season's final episodes, "Mortal Folly"/"Mortal Recoil", expand the mythology of the show by introducing the Lich (voiced by Ron Perlman), who would become the show's main antagonist.

=== Production ===
After Adventure Time debuted on April 5, 2010, with "Slumber Party Panic" and "Trouble in Lumpy Space", the series was quickly renewed for a second season of 26 eleven-minute segments. Around August 2010, the writing for the second season was finished, and the production staff had started to receive bits of animation from the show's overseas animation staff. The first episode to enter into production was "Loyalty to the King", based on its production code. However, it was later temporarily shelved, and aired as the season's third episode. The third episode produced, "It Came from the Nightosphere", was instead chosen to open the season. When the network announced the start of season two, the episode was not finished. On the official Frederator site, contributor Eric Homan noted that he would "prefer [that the series] stock up on a few episodes before jumping into season two, but it ain't my network". The episode was the first episode storyboarded by Rebecca Sugar. During the network pitch of the episode, Ward beatboxed and Sugar played ukulele and the two performed "The Fry Song". Sugar later called the experience "super terrifying", although the network did green-light the episode.

This season's episodes were produced in a process similar to those of the previous season. Each episode was outlined in two-to-three pages that contained the necessary plot information. These outlines were then handed to storyboard artists, who created full storyboards. (Note: Information regarding story development and storyboard artists is taken from the opening credits of the season's twenty-six episodes.) Design and coloring were done at Cartoon Network Studios in Burbank, California, and animation was handled overseas in South Korea by Rough Draft Korea and Saerom Animation. The exception to this is the sixteenth episode, "Guardians of Sunshine", which features roughly 5 minutes of 3-D animation that emulates the style of 8-bit video games. For these segments, the series asked animator Ke Jiang for assistance; he single-handedly "modeled, rigged and animated" the sequence. The Marvelous Misadventures of Flapjack creator Thurop Van Orman was brought in to work on the season as supervising producer and outline writer when his show entered a hiatus, but left shortly after Flapjack wrapped up production in order to concentrate on other projects.

Benton Conner had just finished a job working on the series The Marvelous Misadventures of Flapjack and had subsequently taken on a job as a storyboard artist for Regular Show. However, due to scheduling delays, he was free to work on two episodes of Adventure Time—"Blood Under the Skin" and "Slow Love"—as a freelance storyboard artist. The season was the last to feature creative director Patrick McHale in a full-time capacity. He was still credited with being part of the story writing team with the premiere of season three, but his level of contribution was more limited than it had been for the first two seasons.

== Cast ==
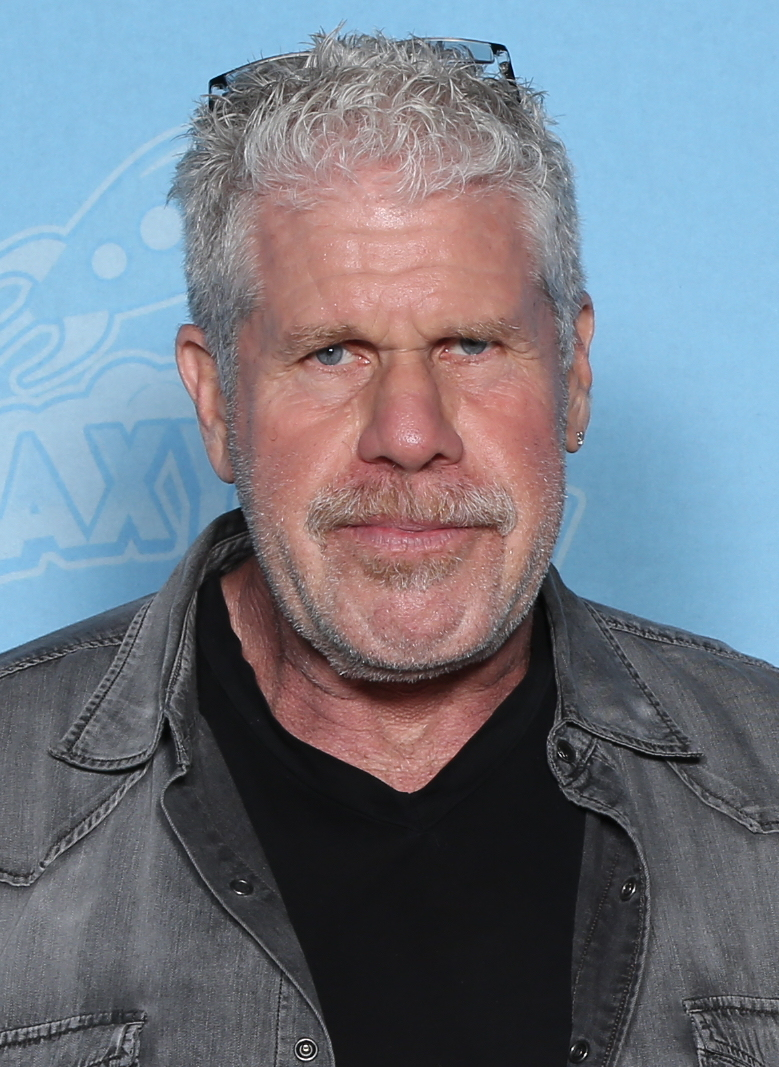
Season two introduced The Lich—the series' primary antagonist—who is voiced by Ron Perlman

The voice actors for the season include Jeremy Shada (Finn the Human), John DiMaggio (Jake the Dog), Tom Kenny (The Ice King), Hynden Walch (Princess Bubblegum), and Olivia Olson (Marceline the Vampire Queen). Ward himself provides the voice for several minor characters, as well as Lumpy Space Princess. Former storyboard artist Niki Yang voices the sentient video game console BMO, as well as Jake's girlfriend Lady Rainicorn in Korean. Polly Lou Livingston, a friend of Pendleton Ward's mother, Bettie Ward, plays the voice of the small elephant Tree Trunks. Season two would also introduce The Lich, the principal series antagonist in the episode "Mortal Folly." The Lich is portrayed by Ron Perlman. The Adventure Time cast records their lines together as opposed to doing it individually. This is to capture more natural-sounding dialogue among the characters. Hynden Walch has described these group sessions as akin to "doing a play reading—a really, really out there play."

The series also regularly employs guest voices for various characters. For instance, in the episode "It Came from the Nightosphere", Martin Olson—Olivia Olson's real-life father—appears as Marceline's father, Hunson Abadeer. Peter Stormare appears as Sir Slicer in the episode "Blood Under the Skin". In the entry "Storytelling", Sam Marin voiced the Teenaged Bear. Rapper Biz Markie guest starred as Snorlock in the installment "Slow Love". Paul Reubens appeared as the Gnome Ruler in "Power Animal". Stephen Root lent his voice to the Royal Tart Toter in the episode "The Other Tarts". Thurop Van Orman voiced the Tree Witch in "To Cut a Woman's Hair". Comedian Melinda Hill lends her voice to Doctor Princess in "The Chamber of Frozen Blades". Henry Rollins and Laura Silverman appeared as Lady Rainicorn's parents in the episode "Her Parents". "The Silent King" featured the voice of Michael J. Anderson, who portrayed Gummy, the Royal Goblin Chief of Staff. Finally, Miguel Ferrer appeared as Death in the episode "Death in Bloom"; Ferrer would reprise his role in the fourth-season episode "Sons of Mars". Jackie Buscarino voiced the titular character in the episode "Susan Strong". In "Belly of the Beast", Andy Samberg voiced the character Party Pat. Brian Baumgartner, Toby Huss, and Kate Micucci appeared as the three ghost friends of Marceline in "Heat Signature". "Mortal Recoil" featured Isabella Acres as a young Princess Bubblegum. Acres would reprise her role in the third season episode "Too Young".

Various other characters are voiced by Tom Kenny, Dee Bradley Baker, Maria Bamford, Steve Little, and Kent Osborne.

== Broadcast and reception ==
=== Ratings ===
The season debuted on October 11, 2010, with the episode "It Came from the Nightosphere". The episode was watched by 2.001 million viewers. This marked a decline from the first-season premiere, which had been viewed by 2.5 million viewers, but it marked an increase from the first-season finale, which was watched by only 1.77 million viewers. "It Came from the Nightospere" also marked gains when compared to the same timeslot a year prior; for instance, 732,000 kids aged 6–11 watched the episode, an increase by 35 percent when compared to the previous year. The season hit a high with its third episode, "Loyalty to the King", which was watched by 2.541 million viewers. The season ended with "Heat Signature", which was viewed by 1.975 million viewers. The season was originally supposed to end with the two-parter "Mortal Folly"/"Mortal Recoil", but due to a scheduling conflict, "Heat Signature" was the last episode of the season aired. The season aired on Mondays at 8:00 pm, the same slot as the first season.

=== Reviews and accolades ===
The season's first episode, "It Came from the Nightosphere" was largely well received by critics. Tyler Foster of DVD Talk called it "a pretty decent example of all the notes the show can hit." He was particularly pleased with the way "the rift between Marceline and her dad is handled with a nice seriousness that fits right in alongside absurd gags about penguins". He also noted that "any episode that includes a song is a plus in my book." It was also called the "real highlight" of the eponymous DVD release by Charles Webb of MTV Geek. IGN writer Matt Fowler later referred to the episode as a "classic". The episode was later nominated for a 2011 Primetime Emmy Award for Outstanding Short-format Animated Program, although it did not win.

The series was a candidate for the "Best and Worst of 2010", a list compiled by the Bucks County Courier Times; the series was under the "Best Animated TV Show" category. Patrick Broadnax of the Huntsville Examiner named the series one of "The Most Underrated Shows on Television". He argued that, in its second season, the show was "shining as one of [Cartoon Network's] best decisions ever." He praised the spirit of the series, noting that it was reminiscent of the "charm that 90's cartoon held so gracefully". He concluded that the show was "goofy, colorful fun that should be able to put a smile on anyone's face." Tyler Foster of DVD Talk wrote that the season release was "highly recommended". He praised that the season was able to "explor[e] and [expand] on everything that" was set up in the first season of the show. He specifically praised "Power Animal, "Death in Bloom", "Crystals Have Power", and "Her Parents" as the best episodes from the set. Foster was slightly critical of the visual presentation, noting that some aliasing was present, but felt that the commentaries were an added bonus.

The show itself was nominated for an Annie Award for Best Animated Television Production for Children. However, the series did not win. The episode "It Came from the Nightosphere" was nominated for a 2011 Primetime Emmy Award for Outstanding Short-format Animated Program, although the episode did not win.

== Episodes ==
No. overall	No. in season	Title	Directed by	Written and storyboarded by	Original release date	Prod. code	US viewers (millions)
27	1	"It Came from the Nightosphere"	Larry Leichliter^{d} Patrick McHale^{c}	Adam Muto & Rebecca Sugar	October 11, 2010	1002-029	2.00
After Marceline (voiced by Olivia Olson) sings a song about the relationship between her and her estranged father, Finn (voiced by Jeremy Shada) releases Marceline's dad (voiced by Martin Olson) from the Nightosphere so that father and daughter can reconnect. However, Finn is forced to stop him from stealing all the souls in Ooo.
28	2	"The Eyes"	Larry Leichliter^{d} Patrick McHale & Cole Sanchez^{c}	Kent Osborne & Somvilay Xayaphone	October 18, 2010	1002-031	2.26
Finn and Jake are kept awake by an unsettling horse that does nothing but stare at them with its big eyes. Eventually, after a night of attempting to get the horse to leave them alone, the two discover that it is actually the Ice King (voiced by Tom Kenny) in disguise; he is trying to learn the secret to being happy like Finn and Jake.
29	3	"Loyalty to the King"	Larry Leichliter^{d} Patrick McHale^{c}	Kent Osborne & Somvilay Xayaphone	October 25, 2010	1002-027	2.54
The Ice King shaves his beard after a princess "breaks up" with him, but when his new look proves to attract other princesses, he capitalizes on the unexpected opportunity by styling himself the "Nice King". At first, Finn and Jake are fooled, but eventually, they discover the truth and try to unravel the Ice King's plans.
30	4	"Blood Under the Skin"	Larry Leichliter^{d} Patrick McHale^{c}	Cole Sanchez & Benton Connor	November 1, 2010	1002-028	1.95
After receiving a splinter on his finger and is harassed by Sir Slicer (Peter Stormare), Finn seeks the Magical Armor of Zelderon for protection, but cannot take the embarrassment. Eventually, Finn realizes that embarrassment is just part of life, and he challenges Sir Slicer to a duel.
31	5	"Storytelling"	Larry Leichliter^{d} Patrick McHale & Cole Sanchez^{c}	Ako Castuera & Tom Herpich	November 8, 2010	1002-030	2.15
While sick and stuck in bed, Jake wants Finn to tell him a good story to make him feel better.The story should have romance, exited and happy ending, He sets out into the woods, but his attempts to find a good story anger the local population. Eventually, he is scheduled to be sacrificed by the forest creatures, until he uses his oratory prowess to convince them not to hurt him. Jake is now crue with a good story, leaving Finn to catch Jakes sickness.
32	6	"Slow Love"	Larry Leichliter^{d} Patrick McHale & Cole Sanchez^{c}	Cole Sanchez & Benton Connor	November 15, 2010	1002-032	2.09
Finn and Jake try to woo a group of lady snails in order to save their house from a giant snail named Snorlock (voiced by Biz Markie), who was using it as a shell. Finn and Jake soon discover that Snorlock is not actually a snail, but rather a slug, which is why he was unable to engage with any snails.
33	7	"Power Animal"	Larry Leichliter^{d} Patrick McHale & Cole Sanchez^{c}	Adam Muto & Rebecca Sugar	November 22, 2010	1002-033	2.23
Jake must stay focused in order to rescue Finn, who has been kidnapped by an evil gnome (voiced by Paul Reubens) bent on turning Ooo literally upside down. After several distracts, Jake eventually comes to Finn's rescue.
34	8	"Crystals Have Power"	Larry Leichliter^{d} Patrick McHale & Cole Sanchez^{c}	Cole Sanchez & Jesse Moynihan	November 29, 2010	1002-036	2.00
Finn and Jake visit a crystal dimension where giant crystal creatures begin to turn Finn into a crystal being. It is revealed that the domain is ruled by Tree Trunks, who disappeared in the eponymous first season episode. She has become the crazed ruler of the crystal dimension, but Finn and Jake eventually save her.
35	9	"The Other Tarts"	Larry Leichliter^{d} Patrick McHale & Cole Sanchez^{c}	Ako Castuera & Tom Herpich	January 3, 2011	1002-038	N/A
Finn and Jake volunteer to help Princess Bubblegum (voiced by Hynden Walch) with a dangerous assignment: toting rare and delicious tarts for the Annual Royal Back Rubbing Ceremony. The two decided to take a dangerous path, figuring that no tart bandits would look for them there. After a trip full of mishaps, the tarts are successfully delivered.
36	10	"To Cut a Woman's Hair"	Larry Leichliter^{d} Patrick McHale & Cole Sanchez^{c}	Kent Osborne & Somvilay Xayaphone	January 10, 2011	1002-035	1.89
Finn must get a lock of hair from a princess to save Jake from the balding Tree Witch (voiced by Thurop Van Orman), but this task proves harder than expected. After Finn successfully gets some of Princess Bubblegum's hair, the witch refuses to let Jake go, because the hair is merely candy. Eventually, Finn sacrifices his long golden hair to save his friend.
37	11	"The Chamber of Frozen Blades"	Larry Leichliter^{d} Patrick McHale & Cole Sanchez^{c}	Adam Muto & Rebecca Sugar	January 17, 2011	1002-037	N/A
Finn and Jake—obsessed with the notion of ninjas—await for the Ice King and Gunter to return to the kingdom, thinking that he is coming back with a stolen princess, and find the Ice King's secret sanctum. When the Ice King returns, the three have a ninja duel.
38	12	"Her Parents"	Larry Leichliter^{d} Patrick McHale & Cole Sanchez^{c}	Ako Castuera & Tom Herpich	January 24, 2011	1002-034	2.18
Jake's relationship with Lady Rainicorn is in danger when he promises to meet with her parents (voiced by Henry Rollins and Laura Silverman), as both species had a long history of war with each other. Jake disguises himself as a Rainicorn, but eventually his cover is blown. Lady Rainicorn's parents are ecstatic, however, because they have an admiration for dogs.
39	13	"The Pods"	Larry Leichliter^{d} Patrick McHale & Cole Sanchez^{c}	Kent Osborne & Somvilay Xayaphone	January 31, 2011	1002-039	1.94
Finn and Jake are assigned to watch three magical beans; two of the beans are innocent, but one of them is evil. Finn and Jake plant the three beans and wait for the evil to grow. Eventually, one of the stalks produces evil piglets, and Finn and Jake defeat the beings using a novel method that involves ice cream.
40	14	"The Silent King"	Larry Leichliter^{d} Patrick McHale & Cole Sanchez^{c}	Cole Sanchez & Jesse Moynihan	February 7, 2011	1002-040	N/A
Finn becomes the king of a goblin clan in order to prevent a conflict of violence, but their strange rules prove to be not of his liking. Finn decides to abdicate, but does it in secrecy, so that the goblins continue to think Finn is ruling them, when he is in fact not.
41	15	"The Real You"	Larry Leichliter^{d} Patrick McHale & Cole Sanchez^{c}	Adam Muto & Rebecca Sugar	February 14, 2011	1002-041	1.83
Finn agrees to speak at Princess Bubblegum's science barbecue, and, worrying that he is not smart enough, secures the legendary "Glasses of Nerdicon". After putting them on, Finn becomes extremely smart, but accidentally creates a black hole in order to impress the princess.
42	16	"Guardians of Sunshine"	Larry Leichliter^{d} Patrick McHale & Cole Sanchez^{c}	Ako Castuera & Tom Herpich	February 21, 2011	1002-042	1.73
Finn and Jake get sucked into one of BMO's games and they have to defeat all three of his bosses. The two accidentally are transported outside of the game when they tilt it, but three bosses follow them and try to destroy BMO.
43	17	"Death in Bloom"	Larry Leichliter^{d} Patrick McHale & Cole Sanchez^{c}	Cole Sanchez & Jesse Moynihan	February 28, 2011	1002-044	1.98
After killing Princess Bubblegum's plant when they were instructed to take care of it, Finn and Jake make a trip to the Land of the Dead in order to get its soul back. After Jake's memory is wiped and Finn loses a musical duel against Death (voiced by Miguel Ferrer), the two are nearly killed until a lucky coincidence causes Death to spare them.
44	18	"Susan Strong"	Larry Leichliter^{d} Patrick McHale & Cole Sanchez^{c}	Adam Muto & Rebecca Sugar	March 7, 2011	1002-045	2.38
Finn is excited to discover what appears to be a tribe of humans living underground near the Candy Kingdom, but gets more than he expected when he tries to teach one of them, the titular Susan Strong (voiced by Jackie Buscarino), about the surface world.
45	19	"Mystery Train"	Larry Leichliter^{d} Patrick McHale & Cole Sanchez^{c}	Kent Osborne & Somvilay Xayaphone	March 14, 2011	1002-043	1.96
Wanting to surprise Finn on his 13th birthday, Jake takes Finn on a train, where they get entangled in a murder mystery. In the end, Finn learns that the murders were all a hoax, perpetrated by Jake to make his birthday memorable and interesting.
46	20	"Go with Me"	Larry Leichliter^{d} Patrick McHale & Cole Sanchez^{c}	Ako Castuera & Tom Herpich	March 28, 2011	1002-046	1.27
Marceline and Jake give Finn advice so he can ask Princess Bubblegum to see a movie with him. Jake's advice is much more romantic, whereas Marceline's is more abrasive and rough. Eventually, Finn decides to go to the movies with Marceline, just as friends, but the two are disgusted by the overt displays of romance at the theater.
47	21	"Belly of the Beast"	Larry Leichliter^{d} Patrick McHale & Cole Sanchez^{c}	Kent Osborne & Somvilay Xayaphone	April 4, 2011	1002-047	1.64
Finn and Jake learn that a group of bears is throwing a party in a giant's belly, giving him a stomach ache. They decide to break up the party. The duo talk to the clan's leader Party Pat (voiced by Andy Samberg), and after a while, are able to get everyone out before they are destroyed by lava.
48	22	"The Limit"	Larry Leichliter^{d} Patrick McHale & Cole Sanchez^{c}	Cole Sanchez & Jesse Moynihan	April 11, 2011	1002-048	1.69
Finn and Jake must journey through a magic wish-granting maze. Jake, in order to make sure he and Finn do not get lost, stretches himself to his breaking point. Finn, however, is able to successfully retrieve the wish and right all the issues that were caused by the maze.
49	23	"Video Makers"	Larry Leichliter^{d} Patrick McHale & Cole Sanchez^{c}	Kent Osborne & Somvilay Xayaphone (Note: David C. Smith storyboarded the final act, but is credited only as revisionist.)	April 18, 2011	1002-051	1.73
Finn and Jake are on an epic race to make a movie for their "Finn and Jake Movie Club", but end up arguing over the film's plot—whether it should be a romantic comedy (Jake's idea) or an action/adventure (Finn's idea). Eventually, BMO compiles the footage that shows Finn and Jake that fighting is not how friends should act.
50	24	"Mortal Folly" (Part 1)	Larry Leichliter^{d} Patrick McHale & Cole Sanchez^{c}	Adam Muto & Rebecca Sugar	May 2, 2011	1002-049	1.92
The first part of a two-part episode. Finn and Jake must go on a quest to find the Lich (voiced by Ron Perlman), while the Ice King constantly asks them for their blessing to marry Princess Bubblegum. The Ice King accidentally drops Bubblegum into the Lich's well of power.
51	25	"Mortal Recoil" (Part 2)	Larry Leichliter^{d} Patrick McHale & Cole Sanchez^{c}	Cole Sanchez & Jesse Moynihan	May 2, 2011	1002-052	1.92
The second part of a two-part episode. Princess Bubblegum is put into the hospital after accidentally being dropped into the Lich's well of power by the Ice King. But when the spirit of The Lich possesses Bubblegum, Finn and Jake team up with the Ice King to stop him. After Bubblegum is seriously wounded and there is not enough candy bio-mass to save her, she reverts to a 13-year-old.
52	26	"Heat Signature"	Larry Leichliter^{d} Patrick McHale & Cole Sanchez^{c}	Ako Castuera & Tom Herpich	May 9, 2011	1002-050	1.98
Marceline pranks Finn and Jake into thinking that they're vampires, but then her ghost friends start to take things too far and try to kill them. Although Marceline tries to save them, the ghosts decide to eat Finn and Jake's brains until all five are able to bond over the movie Heat Signature.

- ^d Director
- ^c Creative director

== Home media ==
Warner Home Video released multiple DVD volumes, such as My Two Favorite People, It Came from the Nightosphere, Jake vs. Me-Mow, Fionna and Cake, The Suitor, Princess Day, and The Enchiridion which contain episodes from the second season. All DVD releases can be purchased on the Cartoon Network Shop, and the individual episodes can be downloaded from both the iTunes Store and Amazon.com.

=== Full season release ===
The full season set was released on DVD and Blu-ray on June 4, 2013.

Adventure Time: The Complete Second Season
Set details
Special features
- 26 episodes
  - 2-disc set (DVD)
  - 1-disc set (Blu-ray)
- 1.78:1 aspect ratio
- Subtitles: English
- English (Dolby Stereo)
- Commentaries on all episodes
  - Featuring Pendleton Ward, Rebecca Sugar, Adam Muto, Ako Castuera, Tom Herpich, Cole Sanchez, Benton Connor, Ian Jones-Quartey, Steve Wolfhard, Jesse Moynihan, and Kent Osborne
- Interviews with the cast and creators by Pendleton Ward
Release dates
Region 1
Region 4
Region A
Region B
June 4, 2013
September 4, 2013
June 4, 2013
September 4, 2013
