= The Eyes (Adventure Time) =

- Adventure Time episode
- Episode no.: Season 2 Episode 2
- Directed by: Larry Leichliter (Note: Director); Patrick McHale (Note: Creative director); Cole Sanchez; Nick Jennings (Note: Art director)
- Written by: Kent Osborne; Somvilay Xayaphone
- Story by: Merriwether Williams; Steve Little; Patrick McHale; Pendleton Ward; Thurop Van Orman
- Production code: 1002-031
- Original air date: October 18, 2010
- Running time: 11 minutes

Episode chronology
← Previous "It Came from the Nightosphere"	Next → "Loyalty to the King"
- Adventure Time season 2

"The Eyes" is the second episode of the second season of the American animated television series Adventure Time. The episode was written and storyboarded by Kent Osborne and Somvilay Xayaphone, from a story by Merriwether Williams, Steve Little, Patrick McHale, Pendleton Ward, and Thurop Van Orman. It originally aired on Cartoon Network on October 18, 2010.

The series follows the adventures of Finn (voiced by Jeremy Shada), a human boy, and his best friend and adoptive brother Jake (voiced by John DiMaggio), a dog with magical powers to change shape and grow and shrink at will. In this episode, Finn and Jake are kept awake by an unsettling horse that does nothing but stare at them with its big eyes. Eventually, after a night of attempting to get the horse to leave them alone, the two discover that it is actually the Ice King (voiced by Tom Kenny) in disguise; he is trying to learn the secret to being happy like Finn and Jake.

== Plot ==
Finn and Jake return home after a week long of adventures, during which they haven’t had time to sleep. When the two are going to their room to rest, Finn wakes up and spots a strange horse outside the window, staring at them. Jake shut the blinds, and they fell back asleep. Shortly after, the moon appeared in the sky and cast a silhouette of the same horse in their room. Finn and Jake go outside to figure out how to get rid of the horse.

Finn politely asks the horse to leave, but the horse doesn’t understand and stays, to which Jake, annoyed that his sleep was interrupted, insults the mammal by claiming that it has a "whacked-out poo-brain." The duo then attempts to push and pull the horse off the hill they are located, but due to its weight, they were struggling, so Jake grows larger, picks up the horse and places it on a different hill. However, the horse magically returns to the hill, and after trying to blindfold it, Jake tries to play music for the horse to go away, only for said music to attract snakes.

Frustrated, Jake suggests that they should just kill the horse, but Finn objects. Instead, they dress the horse as a bunny with the intention that a hawk would take it away. After a couple of hawks pick up the horse, Finn and Jake return home to sleep. Unfortunately for them, the horse returns again, this time inside their tree fort and the two started arguing, blaming each other for their failures to get rid of the horse. Realizing that the horse is tearing them apart, Finn kicks the horse in the rear out of anger. The two then discover that the horse was actually the Ice King in disguise, and he left the tree fort without explaining why he was in the horse suit spying on them.

Enraged and wanting answers from him, Finn and Jake chase the Ice King, fighting him outside their house after Finn kicks him. During the fight, the two demand Ice King to explain why he was spying on them, but he refuses to answer. After Finn knocks out the Ice King’s crown, and he and Jake threatens to cut off his head if he doesn’t explain himself, Ice King finally admits the truth. He explains that he’s been feeling sad recently and after seeing Finn and Jake having fun together, he decided to dress as a horse to spy on them and learn how to be happy. Before Ice King can finish his story, Finn and Jake fall asleep by his sides, to which Ice King questions if all he needs to be happy is a good night's sleep. He closes his eyes next to them and, after a short pause, says he is still not happy.

== Production ==
The story for "The Eyes" was developed by Merriwether Williams, Steve Little, Patrick McHale, Thurop Van Orman, and series creator Pendleton Ward. Kent Osborne and Somvilay Xayaphone collaborated on the storyboard, which was submitted for network approval April 1, 2010. Larry Leichliter served as the episode's director, Patrick McHale and Cole Sanchez served as its creative directors, and Nick Jennings served as its art director.

The horse disguise that Ice King dons to spy on Finn and Jake was inspired by a fat Shetland pony web comic character, created by Kate Beaton. Beaton was asked by Ward himself if the character could appear in the episode. She later referred to the opportunity as "a pretty great thing".

== Reception ==
"The Eyes" first aired on Cartoon Network on October 18, 2010. The episode was viewed by 2.264 million viewers and scored a Nielsen rating of 1.4/2 percent. This means it was seen by 1.4 percent of all households and 2 percent of all households watching television at the time of the episode's airing. This marked a slight increase in ratings from the season premiere, which had been viewed by 2.001 million viewers. The episode first saw physical release as part of the eponymous 2011 DVD, Adventure Time: My Two Favorite People, which included 12 episodes from the series' first two seasons. It was later re-released as part of the complete second season DVD in June 2013.

Leonard Pierce of The A.V. Club awarded the episode a "B+", and noted that both the episode and the series as a whole were evidence that Cartoon Network was "laying the foundation for fondly remembered animated entertainment that today's kids will be talking about on whatever replaces the internet, 15 years from now." Pierce particularly praised the episode's middle act—which features Finn and Jake trying desperately to get rid of the horse—writing that the sequence resembles "classic Warner Bros. cartoons of the past" and that the scenes illustrate "that [Adventure Time] works best when it mines the area where absurdism and physical humor meet." Francis Rizzo III of DVD Talk wrote that the episode's premise was "so simple", but that "the way the horse is presented made his every on-screen appearance draw a laugh." Matt Fowler of IGN named the episode a "standout" from the series' second season.
