= Guardians of Sunshine =

- Adventure Time episode
- The episode features scenes rendered three-dimensionally, as animated by Ke Jiang.
- Episode no.: Season 2 Episode 16
- Directed by: Larry Leichliter; Patrick McHale; Cole Sanchez; Nick Jennigs
- Written by: Ako Castuera; Tom Herpich
- Story by: Mark Banker; Steve Little; Patrick McHale; Kent Osborne; Thurop Van Orman; Pendleton Ward; Merriwether Williams
- Production code: 1002-042
- Original air date: February 21, 2011
- Running time: 11 minutes

Episode chronology
← Previous "The Real You"	Next → "Death in Bloom"
- Adventure Time season 2

"Guardians of Sunshine" is the sixteenth episode of the second season of the American animated television series Adventure Time. The episode was written and storyboarded by Ako Castuera and Tom Herpich, from a story by Mark Banker, Steve Little, Patrick McHale, Kent Osborne, Thurop van Orman, Pendleton Ward, and Merriwether Williams. It originally aired on February 21, 2011.

The series follows the adventures of Finn (voiced by Jeremy Shada), a human boy, and his best friend and adoptive brother Jake (voiced by John DiMaggio), a dog with magical powers to change shape and grow and shrink at will. In this episode, Finn and Jake must defeat the three bosses of a video game they are transported to from inside BMO.

"Guardians of the Sunshine" was the first episode of Adventure Time to feature three-dimensional animation. The scenes set inside the titular computer game were animated by CalArts and Cartoon Network graduate Ke Jiang. The episode was met with mostly positive critical reception, and was seen by 1.73 million viewers.

== Plot ==
Finn and Jake are playing the Side-scrolling video game Guardians of the Sunshine, and Finn attempts to use a combo move to beat the final boss (a toad named "Sleepy Sam"). He, however, fails and angrily remarks that if he were actually in the game, he could easily beat Sleepy Sam. But BMO explains that actually being in the game is extremely dangerous. However, BMO's warning goes unheeded, and Finn and Jake eventually decide to trick BMO into transporting them into its "Main brain game-frame", which allows them to be realized as characters in Guardians of Sunshine.

The duo attempt to beat all of the game's bosses—Bouncy Bee, Hunny Bunny, and Sleepy Sam—but soon realize that their adventuring skills do not transfer in this new digital environment. After Finn and Jake lose several lives, (with Jake jumping into a fire pit twice and Finn being killed by Bouncy Bee and Sleepy Sam) they attempt to break out, accidentally causing the game to glitch. Finn, Jake, as well as Bouncy Bee, Hunny Bunny, and Sleepy Sam, are all ejected into the real world, and the three bosses decide to destroy BMO for imprisoning them. Luckily, Finn manages to successfully use the combo move from the beginning of the episode, destroying the monsters.

== Production ==
"Guardians of Sunshine" is the sixteenth episode from the second season of Adventure Time. The episode was written by Ako Castuera and Tom Herpich. A separate group of writers—Mark Banker, Steve Little, Patrick McHale, Kent Osborne, Thurop van Orman, Pendleton Ward, and Merriwether Williams—came up with the idea for the episode, which Castuera and Herpich adapted to a storyboard. The creator of Adventure Time, Ward was the showrunner during this season, although he later resigned from that position during the fifth season.

The episode is the first in the show to use animation not drawn entirely by hand. The scenes set in the game are rendered three-dimensionally, stylized with discernible polygons and a low frame rate reminiscent of stop motion. These were done by Jacky Ke Jiang, a graduate of the California Institute of the Arts. (Note: Jacky graduated from the school in 2009 for Experimental Animation.) For the production of the characters and the environment in the scenes, Jacky was responsible for producing their models, rigging their meshes, and animating them by himself. In total, the scenes run for almost six minutes. (Note: A hand-drawn animatic from one of the scenes was released by the production crew before the episode aired.)

== Release and reception ==
Cartoon Network originally aired "Guardians of Sunshine" on February 21, 2011. The episode was viewed by 1.73 million viewers and scored a 0.3 Nielsen rating in the 18- to 49-year-old demographic. Nielsen ratings are audience measurement systems that determine the audience size and composition of television programming in the United States, which means that the episode was seen by 0.3 percent of all households aged 18 to 49 years old were watching television at the time of the episode's airing. The network released the episode on DVD, first in 2012, as part of the It Came from the Nightosphere box set, and later in 2013, as part of a box set for the complete second season.

Charlie Jane Anders of io9 itemized the episode in a list of fictional depictions of virtual reality. Ben Bertoli of Kotaku similarly listed it as one of the best episodes related to video games in animation. Anders praised the episode for its humor and described the animation as in the style of third-generation video games, a return to how virtual reality was first depicted in fiction. Matt Fowler of IGN called it a high-quality episode of the second season, while Oliver Sava of The A.V. Club described it as an episode representative of the show as a whole. Jason Holmes of Destructoid wrote positively of John DiMaggio, who voices Jake, and anticipated that the episode could be the best one of the series.

Bertoli praised the animation and found Finn and Jake voluntarily entering the game unique, though according to René A. Guzman of the San Antonio Express-News, who found the episode inspiring of a game based on Adventure Time, it was comparable to Tron. The network later released the first video game based on the show in 2012. Marked by the involvement of Ward, Jeff Schille of Game Rant wrote that this came to no surprise, given "Guardians of Sunshine" and "Dad's Dungeon" from the third season.

== See also ==
- "A Glitch Is a Glitch", a 2013 episode of Adventure Time which features 3-D animation courtesy of David OReilly
