= Death in Bloom =

- Adventure Time episode
- Episode no.: Season 2 Episode 17
- Directed by: Larry Leichliter (Note: Director); Patrick McHale (Note: Creative director); Cole Sanchez; Nick Jennings (Note: Art director)
- Written by: Jesse Moynihan; Cole Sanchez
- Story by: Mark Banker; Kent Osborne; Pat McHale; Pendleton Ward
- Production code: 1002-049
- Original air date: February 28, 2011
- Running time: 11 minutes

Guest appearance
- Miguel Ferrer as Death

Episode chronology
| ← Previous "Guardians of Sunshine" | Next → "Susan Strong" |
- Adventure Time season 2

"Death in Bloom" is the seventeenth episode of the second season of the American animated television series Adventure Time. The episode was written and storyboarded by Jesse Moynihan and Cole Sanchez, from a story by Mark Banker, Kent Osborne, Patrick McHale, and series creator Pendleton Ward. It originally aired on Cartoon Network on February 28, 2011. The episode guest stars Miguel Ferrer as Death; Ferrer would later reprise his role in the fourth season episode "Sons of Mars".

The series follows the adventures of Finn (voiced by Jeremy Shada), a human boy, and his best friend and adoptive brother Jake (voiced by John DiMaggio), a dog with magical powers to change shape and grow and shrink at will. In this episode, Finn and Jake make a trip to the Land of the Dead after killing Princess Bubblegum's (voiced by Hynden Walch) plant when they were instructed to take care of it. After Jake's memory is wiped and Finn loses a musical duel against Death (voiced by Ferrer), the two are nearly killed until a lucky coincidence causes Death to spare them.

Originally, the episode was supposed to revolve around the duo trying to get the plant back, lest Princess Bubblegum turn into a man. In addition, the episode originally was supposed to feature a mysterious rabbit that guided Finn and Jake through the Underworld; this character was later cut. The episode was watched by 1.981 million people and received largely positive critical attention. Many critics applauded Ferrer's voice acting work, and Matt Fowler of IGN singled the episode out as an example of the comedic darkening of Adventure Time.

== Plot ==
While spending time with Finn and Jake, Princess Bubblegum realizes that she needs to leave for a science convention in the Veggie Village. She entrusts the two with guarding her Princess Plant. However, when she departs, Finn and Jake party too hard with the plant, killing it. They then decide on a way to journey into the Land of the Dead and to reclaim the flower's soul from Death himself. For an unspecified price, Peppermint Butler (voiced by Steve Little) teaches the two how to get into the Underworld, and he instructs Finn and Jake also to tell Death that he said hello.

Once in the Land of the Death, Finn and Jake are nearly eaten by conscious skeletons, who crave flesh. While evading these monsters, Jake jumps into the "River of Forgetfulness" and loses his memory. Finn drags Jake all the way to Death's castle. Once inside, Death reveals that he will return the flower's soul if Finn can beat him in a musical showdown. Finn choose to play jingle bells, whereas Death plays drums and sings death metal. Jake, the now-impartial judge due to his memory loss, rules that Death wins.

Because Finn and Jake lost the contest, Death decides to kill them. Before he dies, however, Finn tells Death that Peppermint Butler says hello; Death—revealed to be an acquaintance of Peppermint Butler—suddenly relents and tells the two that they can have "anything [they] want." Death then returns Princess Plant's soul as well as Jake's memory before zapping Finn and Jake to the Candy Kingdom. Bubblegum returns, only to eat part of the plant, causing her hair to change. Peppermint Butler then asks for his payment: he wants both Finn and Jake's flesh, much to their horror.

== Production ==
"Death in Bloom" was written and storyboarded by Jesse Moynihan and Cole Sanchez, from a story by Mark Banker, Kent Osborne, Patrick McHale, and series creator Pendleton Ward. The episode was directed by Larry Leichliter, with Pat McHale and Sanchez serving as creative co-directors and Nick Jennings serving as art director. Both Ward and fellow series storyboard artist Tom Herpich helped Moynihan and Sanchez clean up their story. One scene, in which Finn and Jake hide from the skeletons only to have Jake's flatulence alert them to their presence, was supposed to be storyboarded by Ward. However, he was extremely tired and offered Herpich $100—the amount Ward would have earned had he done it—to storyboard the scene instead.

The episode features an extremely long pan showing much of the Land of the Dead, which was designed by Moynihan. In the episode's storyboard, the pan takes up 7 pages; regarding this length, Moynihan later noted on his personal website that initially he "wanted to really go over the top and make it like 15 pages but 7 pages felt right". Moynihan's original pan was redesigned by background designer Dan "Ghostshrimp" James, who also did some of the other backgrounds for the episode. Other backgrounds were done by Chris Tsirgiotis, who, according to Moynihan, was doing his "best Ghostshrimp impression"; Tsirgiotis himself later noted that, "Matching Ghostshrimp's drawing style is pretty tricky. It looks simple at first glance, but it's actually very sophisticated and nuanced."

The scene wherein Peppermint Butler teaches Finn and Jake to enter the land of the dead by crossing their eyes and staring at a corner was inspired by a story that Moynihan's father told him when he was younger. According to the artist, his father told him that if you "concentrate really hard enough", you would "walk into another dimension". Moynihan recalled the story when he was storyboarding, and worked it into the episode. The climax featuring Death and Finn engaging in a musical competition was specifically written so as to not be "corny". According to Ward, scenes featuring contests were often avoided because they were "the easiest traps to fall into when you're writing an outline", but in this case, the writers realized that a contest would work towards the story's strengths.

In original drafts of the episode, Finn and Jake were guided through the Land of the Dead by a mysterious rabbit. While working on the episode, Sanchez continually felt that the rabbit was misplaced in the episode. Eventually, the writers and series staff began to agree with Sanchez, and when it came time to revise the episode, the rabbit was cut. The rabbit's role was later partially replaced by an ominous talking skull that tries to get Jake to drink from the "River of Forgetfulness". According to storyboard artist Rebecca Sugar, a rough draft for the original ending featured Princess Bubblegum becoming a man without the Princess Plant. Moynihan later noted that the writers were being a "little reckless" when it was pitched, and Ward joked that he had to step in and be "quality control" to prevent the idea from making it into the final episode.

Death was voiced by Miguel Ferrer. Ferrer would later reprise his role in the fourth-season episode "Sons of Mars", and several subsequent episodes after that. Death's look was designed by Moynihan, who admitted on his personal website that he was somewhat intimidated with the task of redesigning such an iconic character. Moynihan deliberately avoided the stereotypical depiction of death with a robe and a sickle, instead choosing to experiment with both a "Japanese cosmic alien thing" and a "Jodorowsky/Holy Mountain inspired" design. The latter design won out, although Moynihan later changed the character's head into a horse skull. The design for the character was then finalized by Phil Rynda, who was the series' lead character designer at the time.

== Reception ==
"Death in Bloom" first aired on Cartoon Network on February 28, 2011. The episode was viewed by 1.981 million viewers and scored a Nielsen rating of 1.2/2 percent. This means it was seen by 1.2 percent of all households and 2 percent of all households watching television at the time of the episode's airing. The episode first saw physical release as part of the 2013 Fionna and Cake DVD, which included 16 episodes from the series' second, third, and fourth seasons. It was later re-released as part of the complete second season DVD in June 2013.

Tyler Foster of DVD Talk wrote highly of the episode, and highlighted it as a stand-out of the second season. He applauded the way in which the series reinvented the idea of the Underworld, noting that its presentation was "hilarious in and of itself". In addition, he was complimentary towards Ferrer's performance as Death; in a review of the Fionna and Cake DVD, Foster referred to the actor's work as "hilarious" in the episode, and in a review of the second season, he wrote that "if 'Miguel Ferrer as Death' isn't a perfect four-word tease pitch for the show's genius, I don't know what is." Matt Fowler of IGN cited the episode as a season highlight, writing that the episode's best part is when "Finn has a 'death metal-off' with Death". He also noted that the episode is important to the series as a whole, as it is one of the many second season entries that marks a "darkening effect" upon the series; he specifically cited the scene wherein Peppermint Butler demands Finn and Jake's flesh as payment.
