= Mortal Folly and Mortal Recoil =

"Mortal Folly" and "Mortal Recoil"
- Adventure Time episodes
- Princess Bubblegum, possessed by the Lich, from "Mortal Recoil". Storyboard artists Jesse Moynihan and Cole Sanchez sought to craft scenes like this that were both humorous and terrifying.
- Episode nos.: Season 2 Episodes 24–25
- Directed by: Larry Leichliter (Note: Director); Pat McHale (Note: Creative director); Cole Sanchez; Nick Jennings (Note: Art director)
- Written by: Adam Muto (Note: Storyboard artist, "Mortal Folly"); Rebecca Sugar; Jesse Moynihan (Note: Storyboard artist, "Mortal Recoil"); Cole Sanchez
- Story by: Mark Banker; Kent Osborne; Pat McHale; Pendleton Ward
- Production codes: 1002-049; 1002-052
- Original air date: May 2, 2011
- Running time: 22 minutes

Guest appearances
- Ron Perlman as the Lich; Isabella Acres as young Princess Bubblegum

Episode chronology
← Previous "Video Makers"	Next → "Heat Signature"
- Adventure Time season 2

"Mortal Folly" and "Mortal Recoil" are the twenty-fourth and twenty-fifth episodes of the second season of the American animated television series Adventure Time. "Mortal Folly" was written and storyboarded by Adam Muto and Rebecca Sugar, whereas "Mortal Recoil" was written and storyboarded by Jesse Moynihan and Cole Sanchez. Both were based on a story by Mark Banker, Kent Osborne, Patrick McHale, and series creator Pendleton Ward. The two episodes originally aired on Cartoon Network on May 2, 2011, and guest starred Ron Perlman as the Lich, and Isabella Acres as young Princess Bubblegum. Perlman's character would become the series' chief antagonist, and would reappear in several fourth and fifth season episodes.

The series follows the adventures of Finn (voiced by Jeremy Shada), a human boy, and his best friend and adoptive brother Jake (voiced by John DiMaggio), a dog with magical powers to change shape and grow and shrink at will. In "Mortal Folly", Finn and Jake must go on a quest to find the Lich (voiced by Perlman), while the Ice King (voiced by Tom Kenny) pesters them for their blessing to marry Princess Bubblegum (voiced by Hynden Walch). After seemingly defeating the Lich, however, the Ice King accidentally drops Bubblegum into the Lich's well of power. In "Mortal Recoil", Princess Bubblegum possessed by the spirit of the Lich, and Finn and Jake team up with the Ice King to stop him. In the end, Bubblegum is seriously wounded, and since there is not enough candy bio-mass to fully revive her, she reverts to a 13-year-old.

"Mortal Folly" and "Mortal Recoil" marked the first time the plot of one Adventure Time episode carried into another. "Mortal Folly" also introduced the Lich, one of the show's primary antagonists, who had first been proposed in the series' pitch bible. Both episodes aired on the same day, and were supposed to air as the second season finale, but due to a studio mix-up, they were instead aired as the penultimate episode, before "Heat Signature". Despite this, they are still considered by Ward to function as the season two finale. Both episodes were watched by 1.92 million people, and received largely positive critical attention; many critics enjoyed the way the episode began to set up the series' mythology.

== Plot ==
=== "Mortal Folly" ===
While meditating with Finn and Jake, Princess Bubblegum has a premonition involving the Lich, an evil undead sorcerer who was long ago trapped in a block of amber by the legendary hero Billy. Bubblegum tells Finn and Jake about the dream, and the three of them journey to the tree at the top of Bubblegum's palace where the block of amber is hidden; Bubblegum also places magical jewels on Finn and Jake's heads that will prevent the Lich from exerting mind-control on them. While examining the amber, a snail is placed under the Lich's spell and helps break him out while Finn and Jake are not paying attention. The Lich then blasts out of the kingdom, leaving a wave of destruction in his path.

Finn and Jake, after acquiring the legendary gauntlet of Billy as well as a special pink sweater made by Bubblegum, give chase, but they are consistently interrupted by the Ice King, who keeps trying to get Finn and Jake's blessings to marry Bubblegum. Fed up with their dismissive attitude, the Ice King kidnaps Bubblegum and follows Finn and Jake as the two heroes pursue the Lich. The Lich eventually reaches his lair, an abandoned subway station, and creates a pool of green liquid which he plans to use to regain his strength and destroy the world.

Finn, Jake, the Ice King, and Bubblegum follow the Lich into his lair. In the entanglement that follows, Billy's gauntlet is destroyed by the Lich and Finn breaks his jewel. The Lich attempts to exert his mind-control on Finn, but Finn finds himself able to resist it. It is then revealed that the sweater Bubblegum gave to Finn has the power to repel the Lich due to it being imbued with "liking someone a lot". Finn then takes the sweater and pushes it into the Lich's eye sockets and rips his face apart, destroying him. However, the Ice King accidentally drops Bubblegum into the Lich's evil vat, to the horror of Finn and Jake.

=== "Mortal Recoil" ===
After Princess Bubblegum falls into the Lich's well of power, she is rushed to the Candy Kingdom hospital and saved. However, the Ice King feels that something is awry and tries to warn Finn, but Finn angrily scolds him and tells him to leave the kingdom. Finn and Jake then focus their energy on taking care of Princess Bubblegum, whose behavior seems off. At first, she claims that she needs some rest, but soon she begins acting strangely, such as convulsing in her bed. Finn leaves to acquire items that Bubblegum requests—which includes weapons-grade plutonium, ammonium, and gasoline among other items—and Jake tries to cheer Bubblegum up with a song.

This, however, backfires and Princess Bubblegum ignites her bedroom with some sort of dark magic. It is apparent that Bubblegum has been possessed by the spirit of the Lich. Finn returns, and the two discover Bubblegum mixing the ingredients that Finn retrieved in her bathtub and then drinking it. She soon deforms and turns into a grotesque monster; she hurls Finn and Jake through a wall and the two discover the Ice King. He finally tells them that he saw with his "wizard eyes" the spirit of the Lich descend into Bubblegum after she fell into the well of power. The three make an unlikely alliance, teaming up to beat the Lich-possessed Bubblegum.

While Finn distracts her, the Ice King uses his ice powers to freeze Bubblegum. Their moment of success, however, is cut short when the still-frozen Bubblegum tips over and shatters everywhere. Her body parts are again rushed to the hospital where she is reassembled. However, there are not enough pieces to complete her, and so she ends up reverting to a 13-year-old girl. Finn, who is also 13, is excited, but the Ice King temporarily gives up his pursuit of Bubblegum due to her age. As the episode ends, it is revealed that the Lich has once again possessed the body of The Snail, who angrily waves goodbye to the camera.

== Production ==
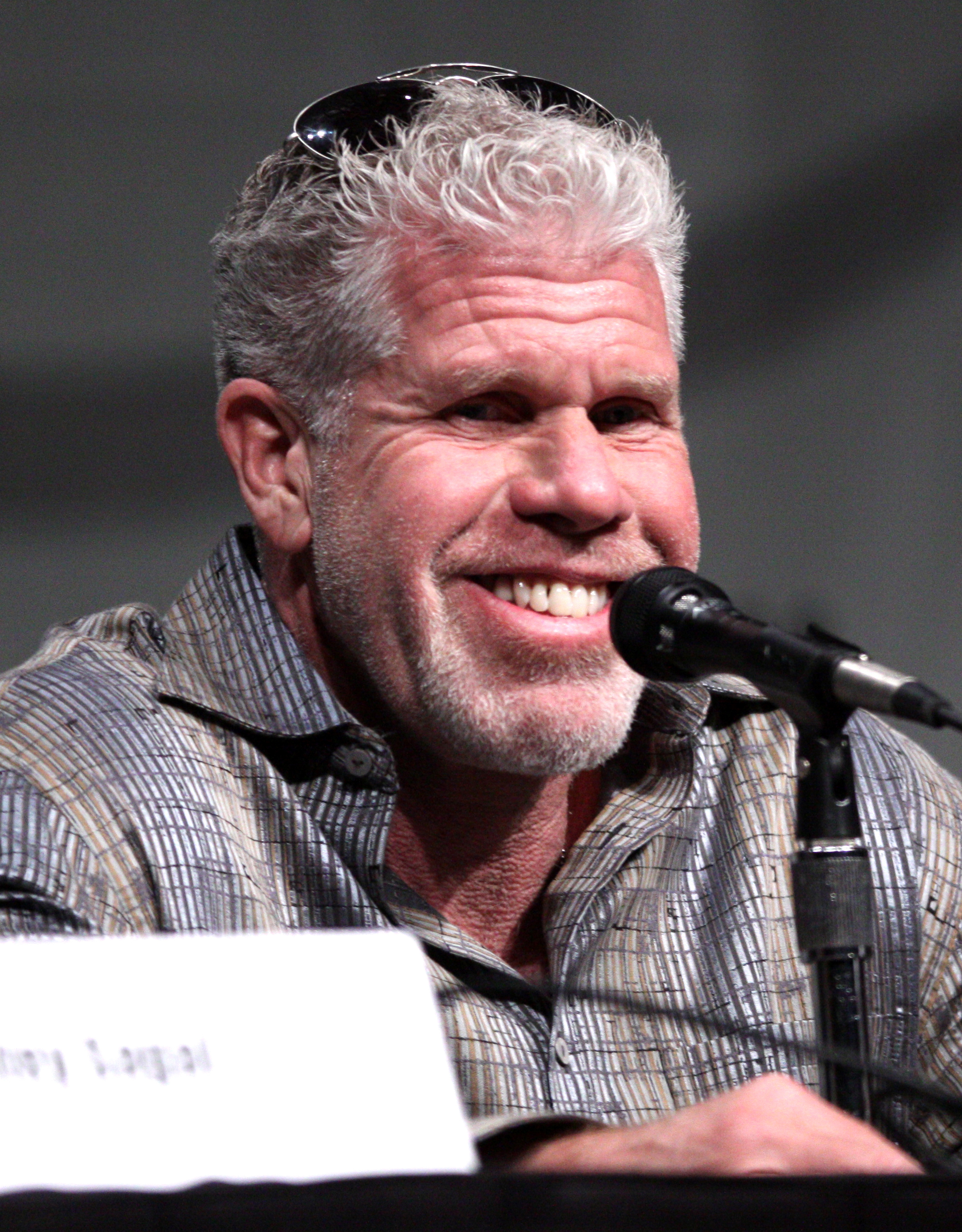
"Mortal Folly" introduced The Lich—the series' primary antagonist—who is voiced by Ron Perlman

Both "Mortal Folly" and "Mortal Recoil" were directed by Larry Leichliter, with Patrick McHale and Sanchez serving as creative co-directors and Nick Jennings serving as art director. "Mortal Folly" was storyboarded by Rebecca Sugar and Adam Muto, whereas "Mortal Recoil" was storyboarded by Jesse Moynihan and Cole Sanchez. Both were episodes based on a story by Mark Banker, Kent Osborne, Patrick McHale, and series creator Pendleton Ward.

"Mortal Folly" and "Mortal Recoil" feature the first substantial appearance of the Lich, the series' primary antagonist, who made an early appearance in the season one episode "His Hero" being defeated by Billy in a flashback. The Lich had appeared in concept drawings in the series' pitch bible, which Ward himself had created in 2007. Ward's original drawing was re-designed by former creative director McHale; he purposely gave the Lich a desiccated and dried-up look, and was instrumental in crafting the Lich's rotting appearance. In both this episode and other episodes where the character appears, the Lich was voiced by Ron Perlman. In the original outline for "Mortal Folly", the Lich had several lines that played him off as a stereotypical villain. Sugar and Muto decided to make him into a more "scary and dangerous" character, and purposely played up the darker elements of the episode. The scene featuring Finn stuffing the sweater into the Lich's eye sockets and then ripping his skull apart was inspired by an artistic design idea Sugar had had when she was in high school; she had wanted to draw a comic featuring a small person getting into a fight and being pushed up to the ceiling.

In the initial storyboard, the Lich's lair was not specifically designed to be a subway. This was added later by the background designers. The undead skeletons that attack Finn and Jake were originally supposed to be "specific undead from [Dungeons & Dragons]". However, Ward changed his mind and tasked Andy Ristaino, a character designer for the series, with stylizing the corpses. Ristaino designed them to resemble "east coast commuters [all] bundled up for winter". He strove to make them look like people you might see on a subway, such as a bike messenger, a couple, man in a "goofy hat", and a man wearing a suit. Originally, when the Lich set off his bomb, the storyboard featured a simple mushroom cloud. Ian Jones-Quartey, one of the series' storyboard revisionists, however, added a face to the blast. Ristaino then added skulls to the smoke. The series' staff liked this version so much that they later included it on the title card.

The snail, an easter egg that appears in every episode, appears in the episodes and plays a prominent part. Originally, the snail was inspired by the in-jokes in episodes of The Simpsons and was Ward's attempt to "make a game out of every episode of Adventure Time where you could freeze-frame and find things in the background", such as the snail. However, in "Mortal Folly", the snail serves as the catalyst for the Lich's escape. The snail would also play an important part in other mythology-heavy episodes like "In Your Footsteps" and "The Lich". Osborne later noted that the snail's appearance was pleasing to fans who knew that the snail had been appearing in all the episodes and had actively searched for it before.

Because a large amount of the action in "Mortal Recoil" takes place in Bubblegum's bedroom, Moynihan was worried that the scenes would not carry interest and "people would get bored". As such, Moynihan and Sanchez created the scenes "trying to be simultaneously funny and terrifying". Ward noted that he liked to be "laughing and freaked out", and that the scenes work in this manner. Former storyboard artist Adam Muto commented that the possession scenes turned out "nice and off-putting". Jones-Quartey called the shot of a possessed Princess Bubblegum melting "terrifying". Although the series tries to avoid "cartoon physics", Sanchez and Moynihan were forced to work around this during the scene when Bubblegum throws Finn and Jake through a wall without harming them. Moynihan later rationalized that the wall was made of candy and thus was harmless.

The end of "Mortal Recoil" introduced the plot thread of Bubblegum de-aging to a 13-year-old girl. This would be expanded upon and eventually resolved in the third season episode "Too Young". The younger version of Bubblegum was voiced by Isabella Acres, who would reprise her role in "Too Young". According to Moynihan, there were initially "rumors" to keep Bubblegum young for several episodes, but the character eventually reverted to normal after only two episodes.

== Reception ==
"Mortal Folly" and "Mortal Recoil" first aired on Cartoon Network on May 2, 2011. Both episodes were viewed by 1.92 million viewers and scored a Nielsen rating of 1.3/2 percent. This means it was seen by 1.3 percent of all households and 2 percent of all households watching television at the time of the episode's airing. The episodes first saw physical release as part of the 2012 Adventure Time: Jake vs. Me-Mow DVD, which included 16 episodes from the series' first three seasons. It was later re-released as part of the complete second season DVD in June 2013. The season was originally supposed to end with "Mortal Folly"/"Mortal Recoil", but due to a scheduling conflict, "Heat Signature" was the last episode of the second season aired. Despite this, Ward still considers the two-parter to be the real season finale, and the two entries are the last episodes featured on the second season DVD release.

Tyler Foster of DVD Talk praised both "Mortal Folly" and "Mortal Recoil", noting that, despite the fact that the episodes represented only "the beginning of the show's journey into direct serialization", the story-arc was nonetheless "a tantalizing taste of what's to come." Wired magazine noted it as one of the stand-outs from the Jake vs. Me-Mow DVD, calling it a "three-part suite", which concluded with the third season episode "Too Young". The reviewer enjoyed the way the episode set the stage for the apparent death, resurrection, and de-aging for Princess Bubblegum, which became a major plot point in the next season. Matt Fowler of IGN praised both "Mortal Folly" and "Mortal Recoil", specifically giving applause to the introduction of the Lich, noting that he is "a real, grotesque villain inserted into the merely semi-dark world of Adventure Time". Fowler ended up being very happy with the two episodes, writing that they end the season "strong".

== Use in other media ==
"Mortal Folly" was later adapted as part of a level pack for the 2015 video game Lego Dimensions.
