= Adult Swim's The Elephant =

2025 American animated TV special

- Created by: Jack Pendarvis; Kent Osborne
- Written by: Ian Jones-Quartey; Patrick McHale; Rebecca Sugar; Pendleton Ward
- Directed by: Pendleton Ward; Ian Jones-Quartey; Patrick McHale; Rebecca Sugar
- Starring: Maria Bamford; SungWon Cho; Jordan Jensen
- Composer: Dolphin Hyperspace (Act 1); Jeff Liu (Act 2 theme); aivi & surasshu (Act 2 score); The Blasting Company (Act 3)
- Country of origin: United States
- Original language: English

Production
- Running time: 23 minutes
- Production companies: Titmouse, Inc; Williams Street

Original release
- Network: Adult Swim
- Release: December 19, 2025

Adult Swim's The Elephant (also known more simply as The Elephant) is an American experimental animated television special created by Jack Pendarvis and Kent Osborne for Adult Swim.

Animators Ian Jones-Quartey, Patrick McHale, Rebecca Sugar, and Pendleton Ward employed an exquisite corpse technique in a style of triptych works, each designing and animating segments of the special independent from one another, to tell a single story with three disparate styles and tones. Ward animated the beginning, Jones-Quartey and Sugar animated the middle, and McHale animated the ending. Voice performances are provided by Maria Bamford, SungWon Cho, and Jordan Jensen.

It premiered on Adult Swim on December 19, 2025 and became available to stream on HBO Max the following day. It was accompanied by a behind the scenes special called Behind the Elephant.

== Plot ==
=== Act 1 ===
The story opens with mysterious, featureless beings harvesting a mechanical body. A piece of this creature comes to life and turns into the main character. This newborn being is told it is neither good nor bad and can become whatever it wants to be. This act focuses on the open-ended potential of starting a new life.

=== Act 2 ===
The second act follows a character known as "Music Button". This character plays magical music that brings great joy to a crowd, but feels immense pressure and dread when it is expected to keep performing. This act is an analogy for artists who become popular but feel trapped by their own creations. Music Button eventually chooses freedom from the crowd.

=== Act 3 ===
The final act begins as a wandering soul wakes up in various bodies across time and space. The soul finally settles into a robot body named Screeno. Feeling hopeless, Screeno tries to end its existence. However, a lonely scientist named Dan steps in and bonds with the robot. Screeno eventually witnesses a near-death event that changes its perspective, helping it find the joy in life.
