= The Marvelous Misadventures of Flapjack =

American animated television series

- Genre: Adventure; Fantasy; Surreal comedy; Dark humor; Horror
- Created by: Thurop Van Orman
- Creative directors: J. G. Quintel (S1–2); John Infantino (S2–3)
- Voices of: Thurop Van Orman; Brian Doyle-Murray; Roz Ryan; Jeff Bennett; Steve Little
- Opening theme: "The Misadventures of Flapjack" (written by Thurop Van Orman & Dan Cantrell; performed by the cast)
- Composer: Dan Cantrell
- Country of origin: United States
- Original language: English
- No. of seasons: 3
- No. of episodes: 46 (90 segments) (list of episodes)

Production
- Executive producers: Thurop Van Orman; Brian A. Miller
- Producer: Pernelle Hayes
- Running time: 22 minutes
- Production company: Cartoon Network Studios

Original release
- Network: Cartoon Network
- Release: June 5, 2008 – August 31, 2010

The Marvelous Misadventures of Flapjack (Note: Also known as The Misadventures of Flapjack or simply Flapjack) is an American animated television series created by Thurop Van Orman for Cartoon Network. The series premiered on June 5, 2008, and ended on August 31, 2010. It stars Van Orman as the voice of Flapjack, a naive young boy who was raised by a whale named Bubbie and is mentored by a crusty old pirate named Captain K'nuckles. Together the trio spend their days in Stormalong Harbor, where most of the show takes place, while getting into mishaps on the search for the elusive Candied Island.

Van Orman, who pitched the idea to Cartoon Network as early as 2001, incorporated his own dreams of marine adventures, acquired while living in Florida as a boy, into the series. During its run, Flapjack received two Primetime Emmy Award nominations, two Annie Award nominations, and one Golden Reel Award nomination.

== Synopsis ==
=== Setting ===
Most characters live in the fictional city of Stormalong Harbor. The city is built on a series of docks in the middle of the ocean with little surrounding land. It is possible to actually swim underneath the city, which is often done by Bubbie. The wealthier citizens live on more elevated piers which have vegetation-growing land attached to it, while the lower class lives lower in the city. Stormalong also has a sewer system and a series of tunnels. Most inhabitants are sailors of some sort, and sailors and/or pirates are constantly visiting from other lands. Stormalong has a great variety of (often bizarre) shops, including a bar that serves candy instead of alcohol (The Candy Barrel). The city appears quite dystopian, having a high level of crime and loitering, and the only form of law enforcement is a small police force headed by the Dock Hag.

=== Plot ===
The series revolves around three main characters: Flapjack, Captain K'nuckles, and Bubbie. Flapjack is a young boy who was raised by a talking whale named Bubbie. Flapjack and Bubbie lead a peaceful life until the duo rescue a pirate by the name of Captain K'nuckles, who regales Flapjack with tales of a place called Candied Island, an island made entirely of candy (as its name suggests), which he's spent much of his life searching for. Enamored by this, and much to the chagrin of Bubbie, Flapjack decides to help him on his quest for Candied Island and dreams of the coveted title of "Adventurer" K'nuckles purports himself to uphold. Unfortunately, not only is K'nuckles not the adventurer he once was, the trio don't know where to begin looking for the fabled island, leading them into a series of strange predicaments and "misadventures" in search of the aforementioned island and candy in general. When not exploring, the three spend their time in Stormalong Harbor, their place of residence and home to many strange characters.

== Episodes ==
Season	Segments	Episodes	Originally released	
Season	Segments	Episodes	First released	Last released
Pilots	N/A	2	May 7, 2007	
Shorts	N/A	5	July 27, 2007	August 24, 2007
1	40	20	June 5, 2008	July 23, 2009
2	38	20	July 30, 2009	June 28, 2010
3	12	6	July 5, 2010	August 31, 2010

== Characters ==
=== Main ===
The lead characters, Captain K'nuckles and Flapjack

- Flapjack (voiced by Thurop Van Orman) is a cheerful yet gullible orphan who was raised by Bubbie at a young age. Flapjack's biological parents are never seen or mentioned. Flapjack is naïve and oblivious to danger, and he is easily caught in dangerous situations. He holds K'nuckles in extremely high regard, with his affection for the captain sometimes bordering on obsession, although he can exhibit some anger towards K'nuckles when he lies to him. During the ending of the final episode, Thurop's son Leif plays the role of Flapjack. Flapjack's original voice actor was meant to be Paul Reubens, but Reubens never showed up to any recording sessions, so Van Orman voiced Flapjack himself.
- Captain K'nuckles (voiced by Brian Doyle-Murray) is an old Irish sea captain. He claims to be a great adventurer, often telling Flapjack fabricated or exaggerated stories of his past experiences. K'nuckles enjoys candy and maple syrup, often valuing the acquisition of candy more than his relationships. Because of his often sociopathic behavior, K'nuckles has earned the open hostility and disrespect of nearly everybody in Stormalong. Although he often exploits Flapjack for his own needs, he is fond of him and will often attempt to get him out of trouble or make things right when a scheme of theirs goes too far. His hands, legs, and bottom are wooden prosthetics. During the ending of the final episode, Thurop Van Orman portrays live-action K'nuckles.
- Bubbie (voiced by Roz Ryan) is an anthropomorphic whale. She is Flapjack's adoptive mother; she found him at sea in a bed of seaweed when he was a baby. Knuckles and Flapjack live inside her mouth, and she serves as their transportation as well as home. Bubbie disapproves of Flapjack's adventures, and she views K'nuckles as irresponsible, lazy, and a bad influence on him. She often allows Flapjack to go on adventures despite her wishes.

=== Recurring ===
- Peppermint Larry (voiced by Jeff Bennett) is the owner and manager of The Candy Barrel, the only place in Stormalong where adventurers can get candy besides the 99 Pence Store. Peppermint Larry is generally depicted as overly-friendly, but his friendliness is most often out of his superficial desire to attract customers and he quickly lets the mask slip when it turns that there is no money to be made. Peppermint Larry is lonely and antisocial, so much so that he creates a wife made of candy named Candy Wife, who is ambiguously inanimate and appears to be demanding and argumentative.
- Doctor Julius Barber (voiced by Steve Little) is the resident doctor and barber of Stormalong. He is also a certified "candyologist". Doctor Barber has an odd, unsettling demeanor. His driving ambition is to perform surgery on and give hair cuts to as many people as possible. His obsession with surgery leads him to always advise the simplest medical problems be addressed with a surgical procedure (much to the denizens chagrin). He leads a secretive lifestyle far outside of what Flapjack and K'nuckles know. Doctor Barber appears to live with his mother, though she resides in a dresser drawer and may simply be a voice Barber hears in his head a la Norman Bates in the film Psycho. Real or not, she seems to nag him about everything. He is often quoted to say, "Hmmm, yes."
- Dock Hag (voiced by Daran Norris) is the law enforcer of the Stormalong dock. She is portrayed as a fat middle-aged woman with dark brown hair. She has a crush on K'nuckles, making a doll of him out of his "dock tickets". She never shows this outside of her home, and is usually cold and bitter to everyone who comes in contact with her. She has a rotten nephew named Lawrence, who is almost as mean as she is.
- Sally Syrup (voiced by Jackie Buscarino) is a young girl who sells seashells in Stormalong Harbor whom Flapjack has a crush on. She is also the daughter of The Professor and niece to The Inventor.
- Eight-Armed Willy (vocal effects by Richard McGonagle) is a large Giant Pacific octopus with a cut sticking out of his head, resembling a hole. Willy has an eye patch over his right eye due to blindness, and is shown to have terrorized Stormalong for years, as he is probably the reason for the Sea Monster Alarm. He is shown to be antagonistic, but he seems to care for Flapjack.
- The Sailors
  - Patch (voiced by S. Scott Bullock) is a mustached white sailor who hangs out with Thomas.
  - Thomas Hatch (voiced by Kent Osborne) is a sailor with a bad temper. He is often seen walking off-screen after being upset by someone, and the other sailors try to comfort him.
  - Satch (voiced by Jeff Bennett) is a black sailor who hangs out with Thomas.
- The Inventor (voiced by Jeff Bennett) is the dastardly brother of the Professor who creates inventions to force child labor.
- The Professor (voiced by Jeff Bennett) is the kind brother of the Inventor and Sally Syrup's father.
- Sea Urchins (voiced by Jeff Bennett and Kevin Michael Richardson) are poor street urchin kids who demand their sea urchin back when Flapjack calls them sissies.
- Lady Nicklebottoms (voiced by Jeff Bennett)
- Lord Nickelbottoms (voiced by S. Scott Bullock)
- Charles (voiced by S. Scott Bullock) A servant that serves Lady Nickelbottom.
- Lolly Poopdeck (voiced by Steve Little)
- Captain Handy (voiced by S. Scott Bullock)
- Slippery Pete (voiced by Jeff Bennett only in Season 1 and Gregg Turkington starting Season 2)

== Production ==
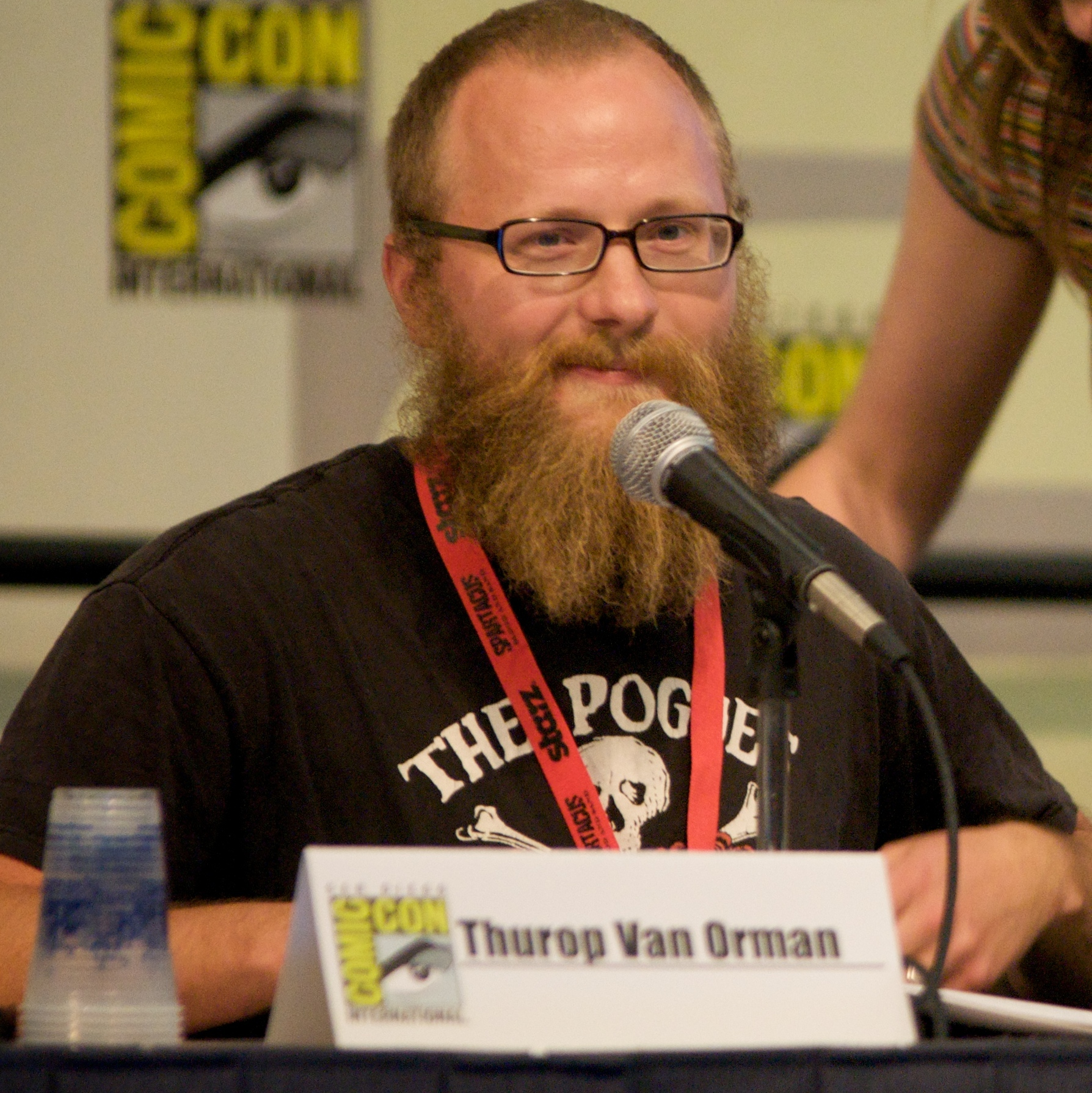
Series creator Thurop Van Orman, pictured in 2009 at San Diego Comic-Con.

As a child, show creator Van Orman lived in Panama City, Florida, and "used to fantasize about living near the dock and having adventures all the time." When he was 13, his family moved to Utah, but Van Orman still dreamed of adventure. He worked after school as a janitor, saving money for a plane ticket back to Florida. There, he packed some rice and potatoes, and paddled a surfboard to Shell Island. He planned to live off sea urchins and "even speared a manta ray," but things soon went sour. Eventually he became badly sunburned and began to starve. He returned to the mainland, but later tried again: he "went to Mexico and lived in the jungles and found [himself] eating out of dumpsters." Orman took his failures in stride, chalking all these bad circumstances up as "part of the adventure".

Many of Van Orman's influences included the likes of Gary Larson, Jim Henson, Stephen Hillenburg, and even his old boss Craig McCracken. Van Orman was well known for his work on other Cartoon Network shows, such as The Powerpuff Girls, The Grim Adventures of Billy & Mandy, Sabrina: The Animated Series, and Camp Lazlo. He also cited Max Fleischer, Richard Scarry, Ronald Searle, Maurice Sendak, Joe Murray, Sergio Aragonés, E.H. Shepherd, Mercer Mayer, and Robert Crumb as his influences.

The original extended theme song for the show was used only once, for a musical special titled 'All Hands On Deck'. Modest Mouse singer Isaac Brock, a fan of the series, provided vocals for the version in the special.

Van Orman attempted to pitch the concept to Cartoon Network in 2001. He created a short and incorporated many childhood favorites, with visual inspiration from older adventure novels. His first pitch was rejected, but he received a lot of feedback and re-pitched the concept in 2003.

The series worked with Screen Novelties to produce the stop-motion and title card portions of the show.

Paul Reubens was originally selected to be the voice of Flapjack, but when Reubens did not show up to any recording sessions, Van Orman himself decided to voice Flapjack.

The series ended on August 31, 2010, after 3 seasons, 46 half-hour episodes, and 90 episode segments. The final episode, titled "Fish Out of Water", focused on Flapjack and K'nuckles turning into fish due to eating too much candy and, at the end of the episode, featured an appearance by creator Thurop Van Orman and his son Leif Van Orman, who played live-action versions of Flapjack and K'nuckles after they once again eat too much candy. A live-action version of Bubbie also appeared.

== In other media ==
=== DVD release ===
The Marvelous Misadventures of Flapjack: Volume 1 Region 1 DVD was released on September 15, 2009, and contains the first ten episodes along with four bonus features.

=== Video games ===
A Flapjack video game was confirmed by series creator Thurop Van Orman in Spring 2010 for the Nintendo DS system. When the show was cancelled, the game was cancelled with it. Flapjack and Captain K'nuckles appeared as playable characters in Cartoon Network: Punch Time Explosion; Peppermint Larry and Candy Wife acted as assist characters, while one of the stages is set within Bubbie's Mouth, and Eight-Armed Willy appears as part of Flapjack's Super Attack.

== Reception ==
The series received positive reviews by critics and audiences which led to it developing a cult following. In his book The Encyclopedia of American Animated Television Shows, David Perlmutter regarded Flapjack as "a cleverly produced and amusing series that never completely got the exposure or respect it deserved. Creator Van Orman combined his life-long affection for the sea with a uniquely designed steampunk-type universe that brought to mind the technology and the moral ambigiuity inherent in 19th-century media, as reflected in many fictional narratives from that time."

Journalist Melissa C. from Game Rant praised the show, stating, "The Marvelous Misadventures of Flapjack was creative, funny, and aesthetically pleasing. It should have at least gotten a few more seasons. Its legacy lives on because of the shows it inspired. If new episodes were made today, possibly with more live action elements, it would rival any show it was up against."

=== Industry impact ===
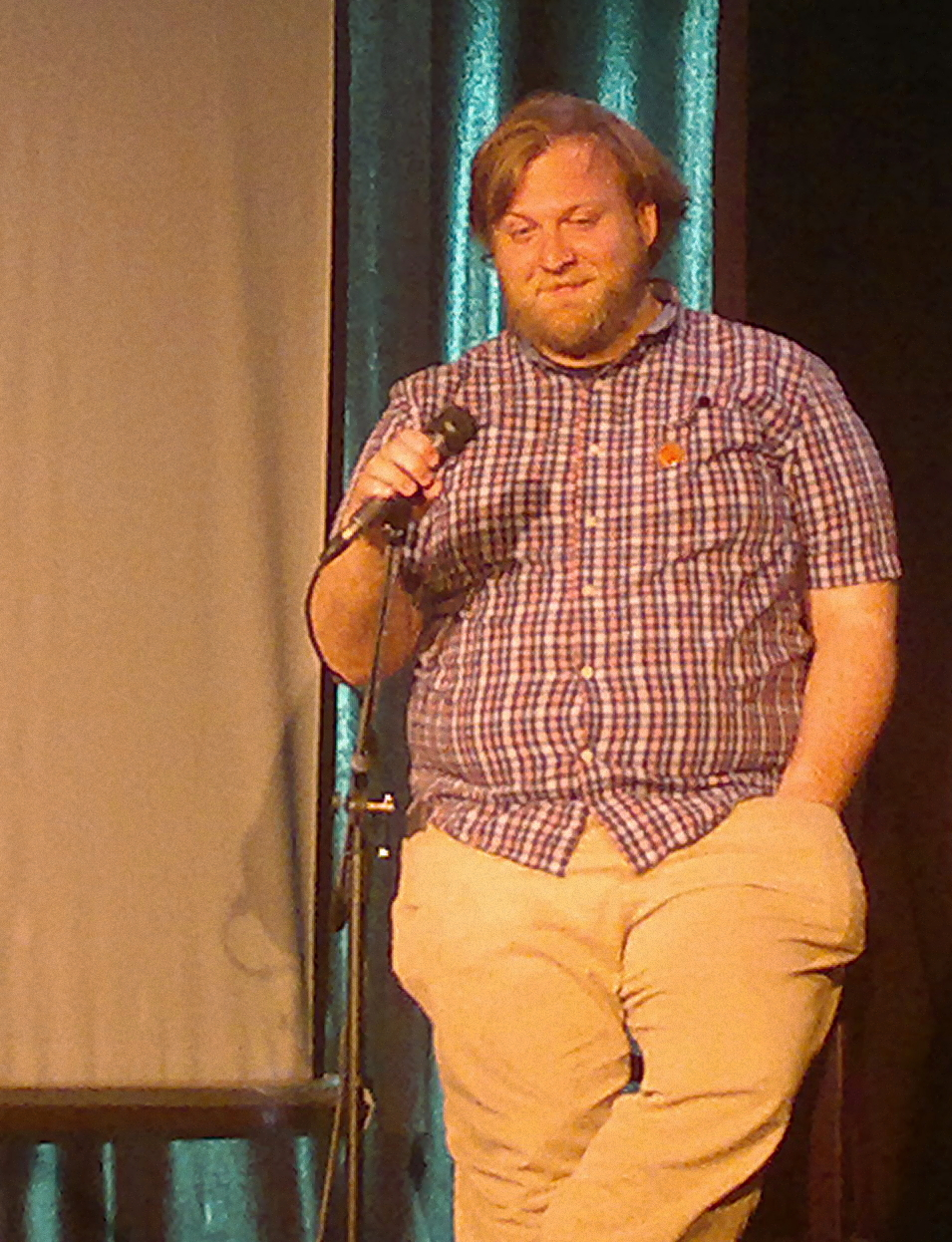
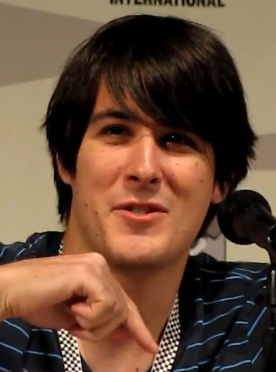
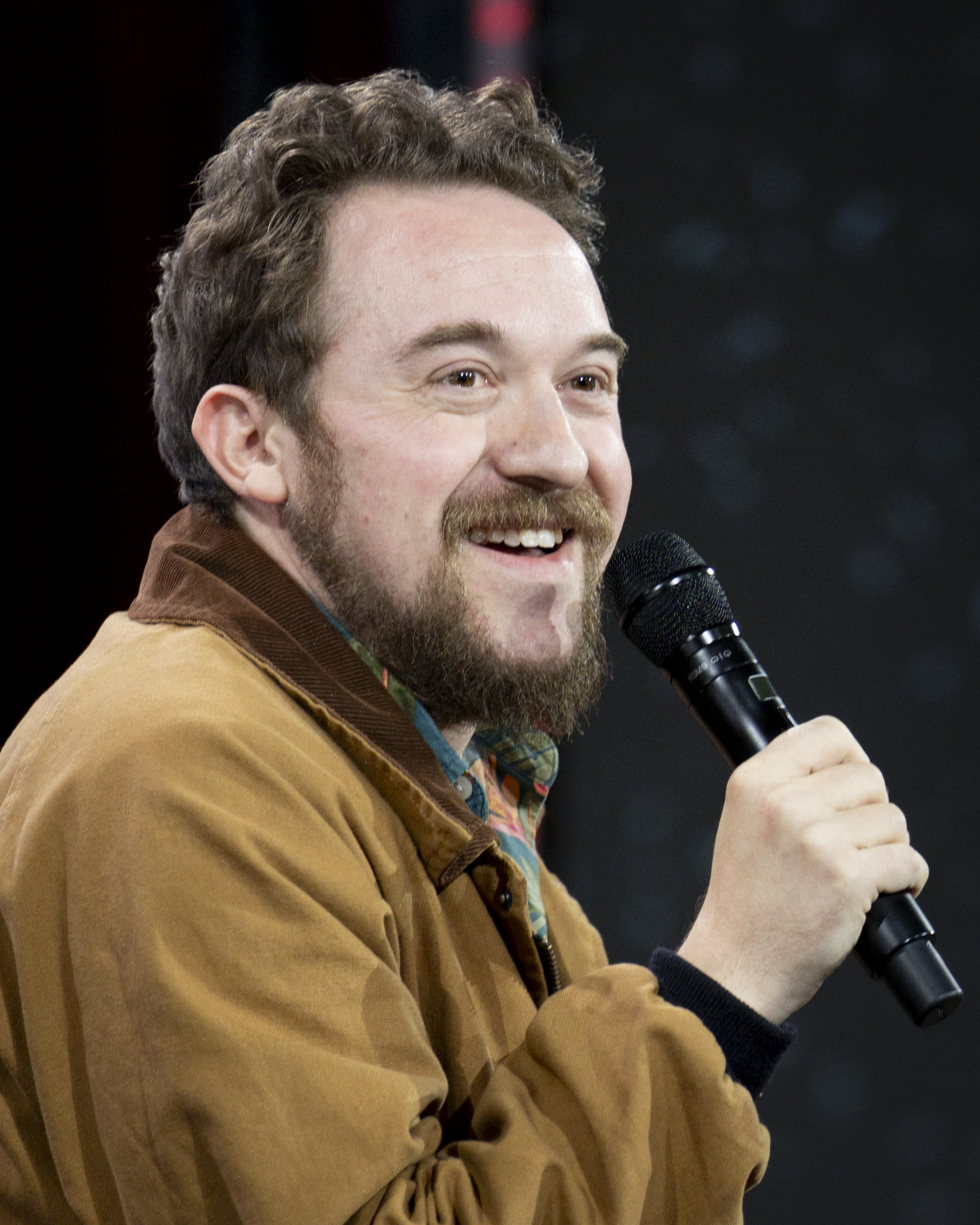
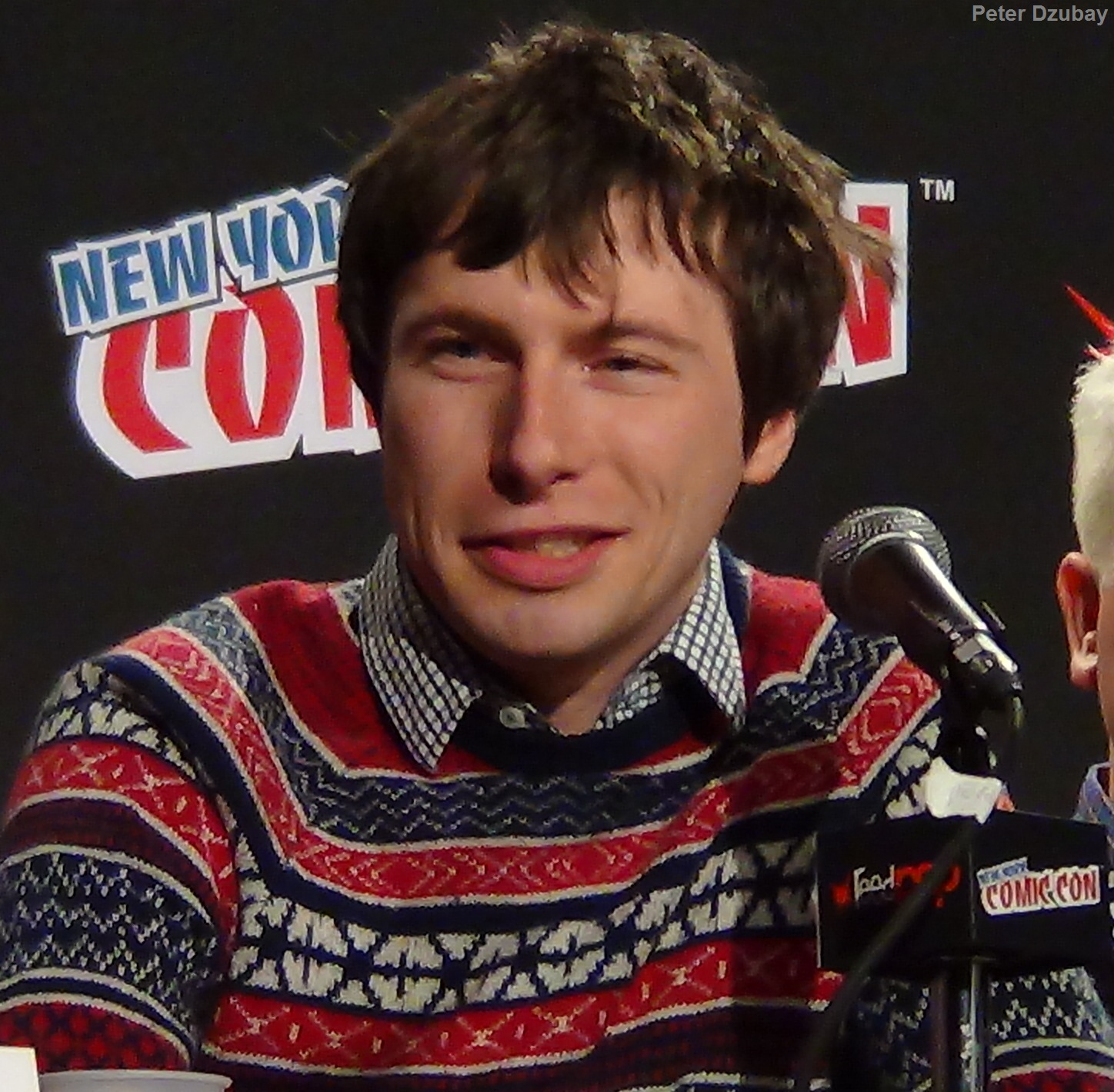
Some of the notable animators who worked on The Marvelous Misadventures of Flapjack, listed here from left to right:
(Top Row) Pendleton Ward, J. G. Quintel
(Bottom Row) Alex Hirsch, Patrick McHale.

Several former storyboard artists and production crew members who worked on The Marvelous Misadventures of Flapjack have gone on to create their own shows, incorporating much of the humor and surrealism of the aforementioned series. These included Pendleton Ward (a former writer and storyboard artist who went on to create Adventure Time), J. G. Quintel (a former creative director and storyboard artist who went on to create Regular Show), Alex Hirsch (a former writer and storyboard artist who went on to create Gravity Falls), and Patrick McHale (a former writer and storyboard artist who went on to create Over the Garden Wall). These shows also had crew members who went on to make their own shows as well, creating what many refer to as the 'Flapjack family of cartoons'. The impact Flapjack had on the animation industry would be acknowledged in the Adventure Time: Fionna and Cake episode "Prismo the Wishmaster."

=== Awards ===
Year	Award	Category	Nominee	Result	Refs
2009	Golden Reel Awards	Best Sound Editing – Television Animation		Nominated	
2009	Primetime Emmy Awards	Outstanding Individual Achievement in Animation	Chris Roszak (for "Sea Legs")	Won	
2010	Annie Awards	Best Animated Television Production for Children		Nominated	
2010	Annie Awards	Best Directing in a Television Production	John Infantino & J. G. Quintel (for "Candy Cassanova")	Nominated	
2010	Primetime Emmy Awards	Outstanding Short Form Animated Program	For "Tee Hee Tummy Tums"	Nominated	
