= Jesse Moynihan =

American artist, animator, composer and director (born 1978)

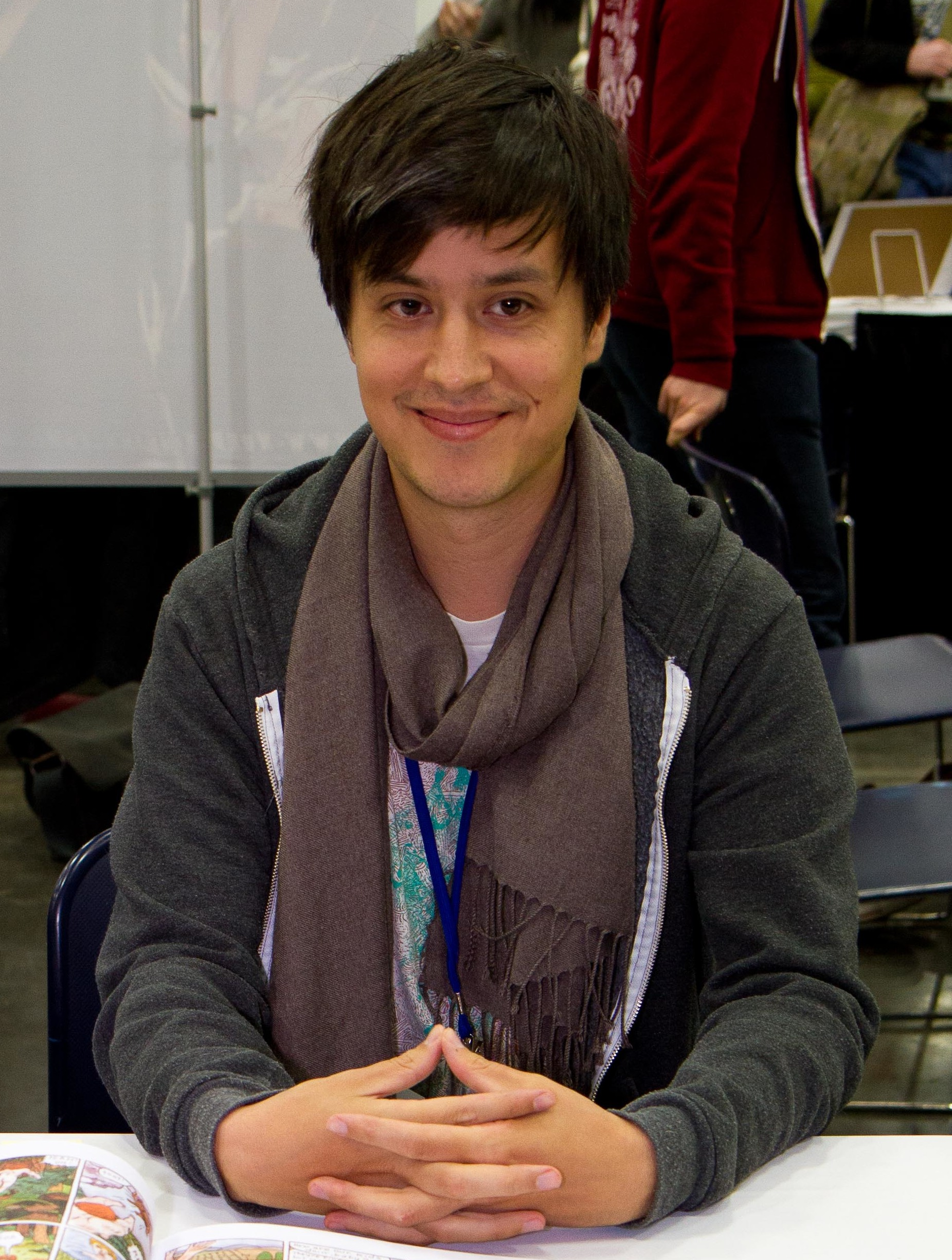
- Jesse Moynihan in 2012
- Born: Jesse Mark Moynihan; January 4, 1978 (age 48); Santa Ana, California, U.S.
- Occupations: Animator; writer; artist
- Years active: Early 2000s–present
- Notable work: Manly; Forming

Jesse Mark Moynihan (born January 4, 1978) is an American artist, animator, composer and director. He is best known for being a writer and storyboard artist on the animated television series Adventure Time and as the creator of the graphic novel Forming. He also released the animated short Manly exclusively through Cartoon Hangover, made with his brother Justin.

He has most recently participated in The Midnight Gospel as director of the art department.

== Early life ==
Jesse was born in Santa Ana, California to Shoko and Robert Moynihan. The family moved to Pennsylvania when he was one, where he spent the rest of his childhood with his younger brother, Justin.

At an early age, Jesse was encouraged to draw and learn music. His parents started him on violin when he was five. In elementary school, he drew his first comic about a character named Super Bug, described by Jesse as a dust ball with legs and Garfield eyes.

Jesse went to a Quaker boarding school in Westtown Township, Pennsylvania. It was here that Jesse and his brother Justin began their leap into greater explorations of art and music. Jesse graduated from Westtown School in 1996, and attended Pratt institute for one year, before moving to Philadelphia, Pennsylvania to focus on his own artistic endeavors. He later earned a film degree from Temple University.

== Music ==
In high school, Jesse formed the punk band, Anal Sausage with his brother and friend Dave "Sausage" Walling. The group lasted from 1993–1999 and gained cult notoriety among the underground punk scene in Philadelphia, playing such venues as the legendary Stalag 13. After Anal Sausage disbanded, Jesse and Justin moved into a house in South Philadelphia with their high school friend, Brandon Beaver, who later went on to play in the band mewithoutYou. The three built a recording studio in their basement, where they would practice and record with their band Hiroshima Nagasaki. Other bands Jesse has been in include Hunson Abadeer, Ivy Labs, Wolf Vs, Kuru Kuru Pa, and Hiroshima Lemon. In addition, he also auditioned as drummer for Dr. Dog. Make A Rising is Jesse's most current band, and consists of brothers Moynihan, and John Heron. Past members of Make A Rising include Brandon Beaver, John Pettit, Andrew Ciccone, Nick Millevoi, and Travis Woodson. Photos for the band's album covers were taken by friend and photographer Ryan Collerd. Jesse has also contributed violin playing to bands such as Dr. Dog, Man Man, Whales & Cops, & The Teeth.

In 2005, Jesse, Justin, & MAR drummer John Heron moved into a warehouse in West Philadelphia which they coined The Avant Gentlemen's Lodge. They turned the warehouse into a DIY venue space, which hosted "The Astral Projection Club"; plays by local playwrights; seasonal solstice and equinox parties, and musical performances from notable acts such as Dan Deacon, Kayo Dot, and The Flying Luttenbachers.

== Comics ==
Jesse has published three graphic novel series: The Backwards Folding Mirror, Follow Me, and Forming, which ran from 2009 to 2024. Forming can also be collected in volumes through Nobrow Press. Forming has received a fair share of critical attention; Rob Clough of The Comics Journal described it as "a success on so many different levels" and praised the series' storyline and "brightly colored and bizarre images".

He has contributed work to such publications as Philadelphia Weekly, The Philadelphia Independent, Arthur magazine, Mome, Meathaus, and Vice. Jesse collaborated with graphic novelist Dash Shaw in the May 2010 issue of The Believer magazine.

== Awards ==
In 2005, Jesse received the Xeric Foundation grant for self-publishing comic artists. He used the money to self-publish two issues of The Backwards Folding Mirror.

His work on Adventure Time gained him an Emmy Award nomination in 2012 for the third season episode "Too Young".

== Filmography ==
=== Television ===
Year	Title	Role
2010–2015	Adventure Time	Writer, storyboard artist
2014	Manly	Co-creator, writer, director
2018–2020	Summer Camp Island	Writer, storyboard artist
2020	The Midnight Gospel	Art director
2021	Alpha Betas	Director
2021	Adventure Time: Distant Lands	Writer
2024	Smiling Friends	Additional character designer
2026	Cartoon Cartoons	Creator, executive producer, writer and storyboard artist for the short, “Hungy Ghost”
2026	Adventure Time: Side Quests	Writer, storyboard artist

== Art exhibitions ==
- Secret Headquarters, Los Angeles, CA: New Age Fighters (Solo Show) April 5, 2013
- Giant Robot 2, Los Angeles, CA: Video Game Show June 2012
- Giant Robot 2, Los Angeles, CA: Post Its November 7, 2011
- Gallery Nucleus, Alhambra CA: A Look Behind the Land of Ooo April 2011
- Space 1026, Philadelphia PA: CGI vs. Forming January 2011
- Eyelevel BQE, Brooklyn, NY: Future Ink, June 2009
- Seraphin Gallery, Philadelphia, PA: Group Show, February 2006
- Diane Ashley Gallery, Philadelphia, PA
- Local Yokel: Lubrica Mi Vida, May 2005.
- Big Jar Books, Philadelphia, PA: Brothers Moynihan, 2004.
- Padlock Gallery, Philadelphia, PA: Degenerate Art, 2004.
- North Star, Philadelphia, PA: Jackpot, 2004.
- A-Space, Philadelphia, PA: New Planet Collective, 2002.
