= Patrick McHale (artist) =

American animator, screenwriter (born 1983)

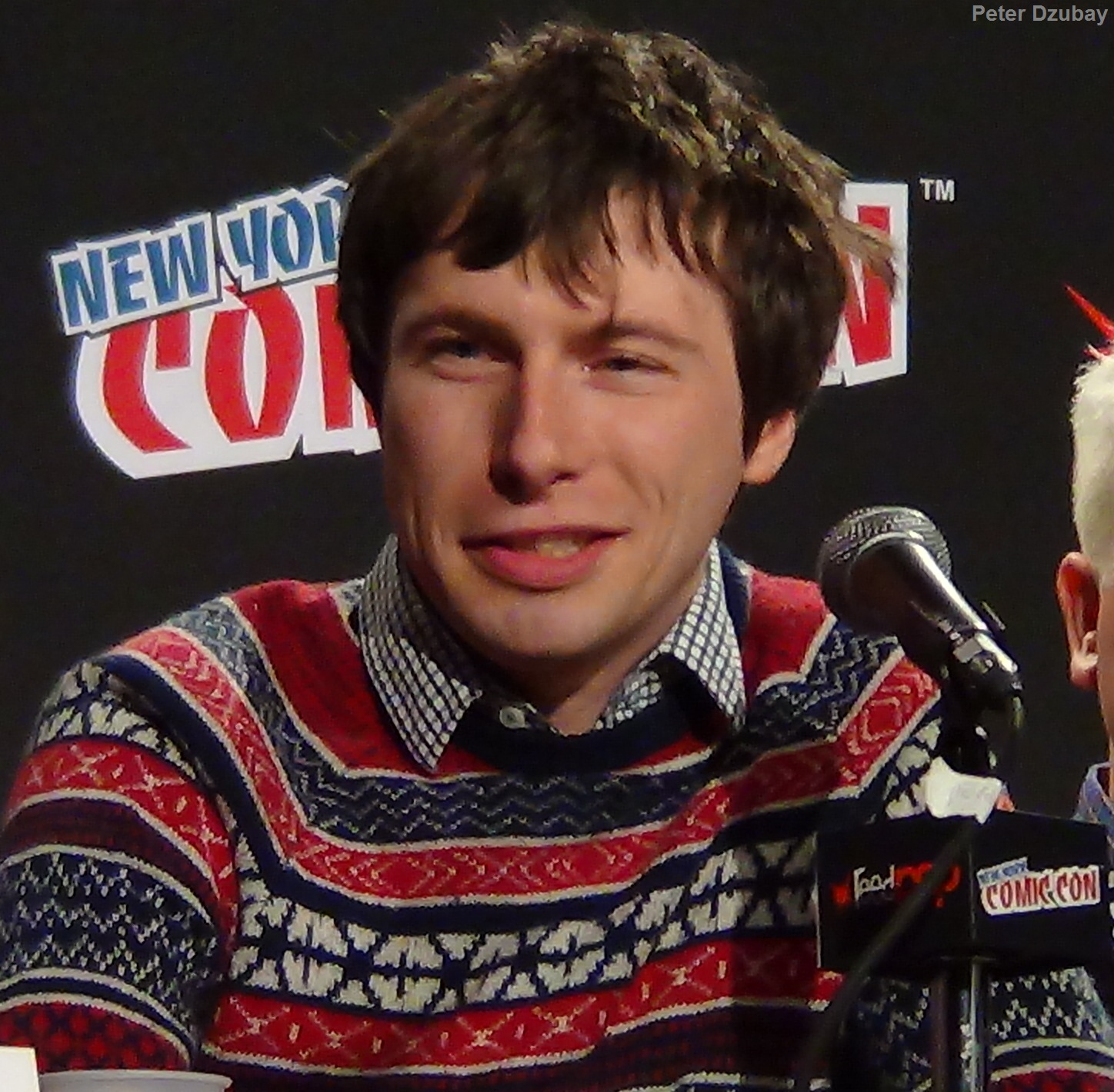
- McHale at the 2014 New York Comic Con
- Born: Patrick Nolen McHale; November 17, 1983 (age 43); Chatham, New Jersey, U.S.
- Occupations: Animator, artist, screenwriter, director, musician
- Years active: 2007–present
- Known for: Over the Garden Wall
- Website: oldsidelinghill.com/2021.html

Patrick Nolen McHale (born November 17, 1983) is an American animator, storyboard artist, screenwriter, director, and musician. He is best known for creating the animated television miniseries Over the Garden Wall.

== Life and career ==
=== Early career ===
McHale graduated from the California Institute of the Arts in Santa Clarita in 2006 with a BFA in character animation. He began his professional career at Cartoon Network Studios in 2007, as a writer and storyboard artist on Thurop Van Orman's The Marvelous Misadventures of Flapjack. He helped Van Orman create ten episodes. The one-shot character Punsie McKale was inspired by and modeled after McHale.

After leaving Flapjack, he joined fellow CalArts alum and Flapjack storyboard artist Pendleton Ward to help develop Ward's Adventure Time short into an animated series, Adventure Time. Once the show was picked up, McHale stayed as the show's creative director through the show's second season. Then he moved to New York City with his wife and fellow filmmaker Jiwook Kim. He continued to freelance for the show in the capacity of writing some songs and providing input on story outlines until the middle of season five.

=== Tome of the Unknown and Over the Garden Wall ===
In October 2011, he began to make the eight-minute animated short Tome of the Unknown, which was produced as part of Cartoon Network's shorts development program. Unlike the other pilots, released online on Cartoon Network Video, the film was showcased during the festival circuit throughout 2013 and early 2014. It received The Bruce Corwin Award for Best Animated Short Film at the Santa Barbara International Film Festival in Santa Barbara, California.

The short became the basis for a ten-part miniseries Over the Garden Wall, which premiered over five consecutive nights in November 2014. Tome of the Unknown was streamed online in May 2015. McHale won a National Cartoonists Society Reuben award as the creator of Over the Garden Wall, in the category for TV Animation. The series won an Emmy Award for Best Animated Program. In the same year, McHale's Over the Garden Wall won Best Animated Feature at the Ottawa International Animation Festival in Ottawa, Canada. In 2016, McHale received an Eisner Award for Best Publication for Kids as the creator and a writer of the Over the Garden Wall comic book featuring the characters who first appeared in the television series.

In a 2016 interview, McHale cited many influences on the overall production of Over the Garden Wall, including a vintage visual and musical Americana aesthetic, the fairytale folklore of the Brothers Grimm, Gustave Doré's moody, atmospheric engravings, and several early short films from Silly Symphonies by Walt Disney and Ub Iwerks.

=== Other works ===
In early 2015, McHale self-published his first short novel, Bags, via Etsy. In 2015, Frederator Studios announced that McHale would direct an 11-minute adaptation of Costume Quest. On February 22, 2015, he released an original album via his Bandcamp page titled The End.

In 2017, director Guillermo del Toro announced that McHale would co-write the script to del Toro's stop-motion adaptation of Pinocchio. In February 2021, Netflix announced that McHale would serve as scriptwriter for an animated film adaptation of the novel Redwall by Brian Jacques, an English author. By December 2022, McHale left the project due to changes at Netflix Animation. Netflix would end up abandoning the project in April, 2026. On April 7, 2023, he released the album Those Wild Days in collaboration with J.R. Kaufman from the band The Blasting Company through Bandcamp.

On June 14, 2024, it was announced that McHale returned to Cartoon Network Studios to be part of the development team for “The Adventure Time Movie” movie alongside Rebecca Sugar and Adam Muto. Celebrating the tenth anniversary of Over the Garden Wall, McHale collaborated with Aardman Animations to create a stop motion short featuring characters from the show. The short film was uploaded to YouTube on November 3, 2024 by Cartoon Network. He co-wrote the short with Dan Ojari and Mikey Please.

On June 12, 2025, Adult Swim announced that McHale alongside Pendleton Ward, Rebecca Sugar and Ian Jones-Quartey were developing an animated special under the name Adult Swim's The Elephant which debuted on December 19, 2025.

In December 2025, McHale revealed that he was developing a live-action/puppetry feature film that acts as a spiritual successor to "Over The Garden Wall" but that several studios haven't picked it up.

== Filmography ==
=== Short films ===
- "Simon and Pig on Holiday" (student film, 2003)
- "Body" (student film, 2004)
- "Candle" (student film, 2005)
- "Apple Bears in the Desert" (2011)
- "Efforts" (2011)
- "Fall Guy" (2011)
- "Tome of the Unknown" (Cartoon Network Studios, 2013)
- "The Zombie" (music video for C. W. Stoneking, 2016)
- "Over the Garden Wall | 10th Anniversary Stop Motion Short" (Aardman Animation and Cartoon Network Studios, 2024)

=== Films ===
Year	Title	Role
2022	Guillermo del Toro's Pinocchio	Screenplay co-writer and lyricist for "Fatherland March", "The Late Lamented" and "Big Baby II Duce March"
TBA	The Adventure Time Movie	Development

=== Television ===
Year	Title	Role
2007–2008	The Marvelous Misadventures of Flapjack	Writer and storyboard artist
2010–2013; 2016–2017	Adventure Time	Creative director (Seasons 1–2), writer, and storyboard artist ("The Enchiridion!" and "Blenanas")
2014	Over the Garden Wall	Creator, executive producer, writer, storyboard artist, and songwriter
2015–2016	Gravity Falls	Voice role as Hectorgon; 3 episodes
2023	Adventure Time: Fionna and Cake	Songwriter: "Winter Wonder World" and "Baked with Love"
2025	Adult Swim's The Elephant	Creator, screenwriter and animator

=== Internet ===
Year	Title	Role
2014	Blackford Manor	Writer and voice director
2019	Costume Quest	Director
