= Thurop Van Orman =

American cartoonist and animator (born 1976)

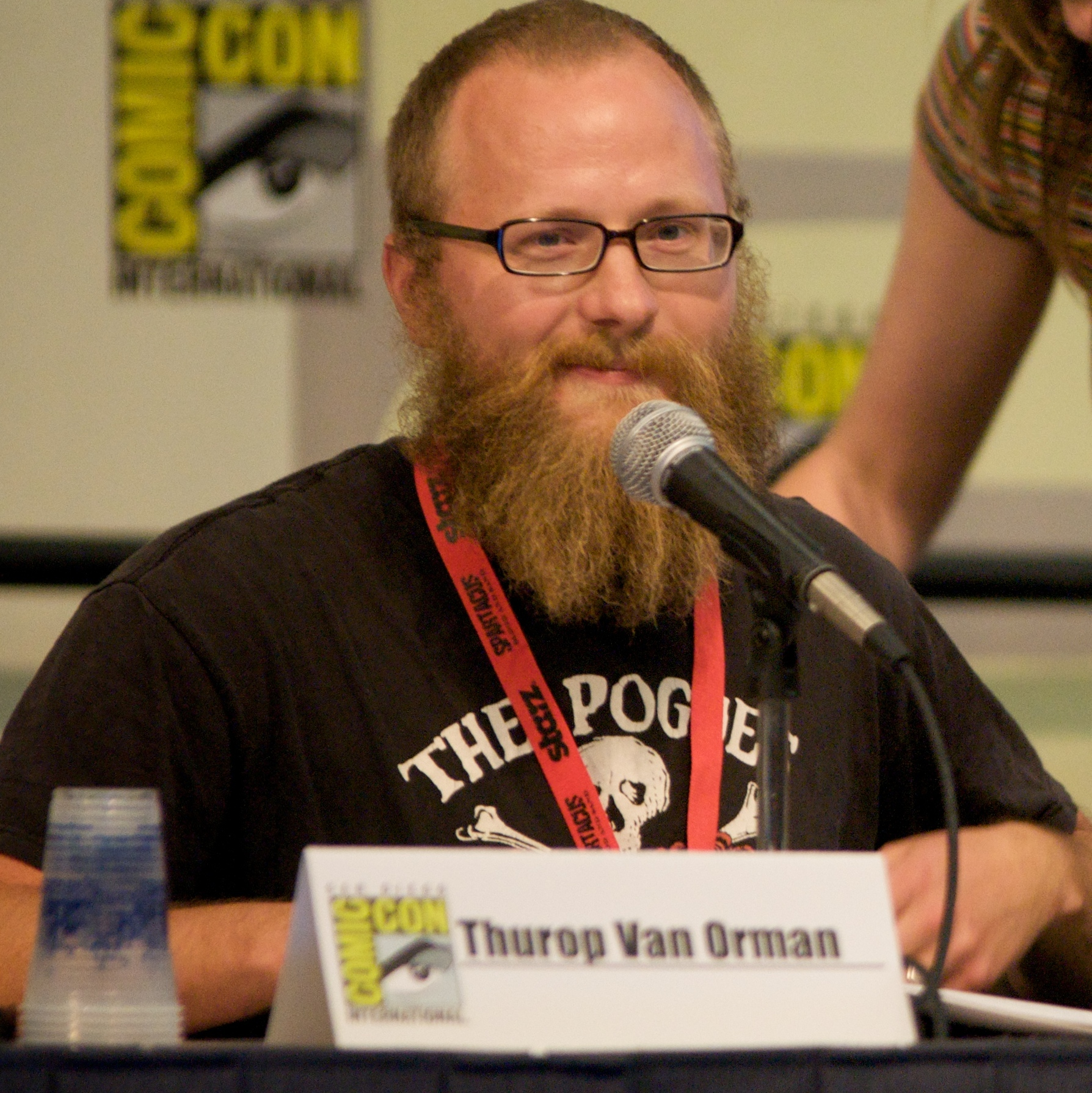
- Van Orman at the 2009 San Diego Comic-Con
- Born: Mark Ashton Van Orman; April 26, 1976 (age 50); Norfolk, Virginia, U.S.
- Education: California Institute of the Arts (BFA)
- Occupations: Storyboard artist; animator; writer; producer; director; voice actor
- Years active: 2000–present
- Known for: The Marvelous Misadventures of Flapjack; The Angry Birds Movie 2 Home: Adventures with Tip & Oh; Camp Lazlo
- Spouse: Sherri Van Orman (m. 1999)
- Children: 2

Mark Ashton "Thurop" Van Orman (born April 26, 1976) is an American storyboard artist, animator, writer, producer, director, and voice actor. He is best known as the creator and executive producer of the Cartoon Network animated series The Marvelous Misadventures of Flapjack, in which he also voiced the titular character. He has worked on series such as Camp Lazlo!, Adventure Time, Sanjay and Craig, Home: Adventures with Tip & Oh, and was the voice of Lil' Gideon on Gravity Falls. He made his directorial debut with The Angry Birds Movie 2 (2019), and wrote the screenplay for its upcoming sequel.

== Early life ==
Van Orman was born in Norfolk, Virginia and grew up in Panama City, Florida. As a child, he wanted to live closer to the docks and would always love to adventure. He read plenty of adventure novels including from Jules Verne. He and his family moved to Salt Lake City when he was 12. He dreamed about being self-sustaining and wanting to build a hut. He later got a job as a janitor and moved to Shell Island at St. Andrews State Park. He spent a summer living in the jungles of Mexico.

== Career ==
In 2001, he made a pitch pilot for The Marvelous Misadventures of Flapjack.

Van Orman worked for the video game company Zantaro before going on to study character animation at the California Institute of the Arts. He interned for The Powerpuff Girls during his attendance. Van Orman was a storyboard artist and co-writer for Camp Lazlo, and The Grim Adventures of Billy & Mandy. He was also the supervising producer for both Adventure Time and Sanjay and Craig, but left the latter show after one season.

In 2015, Van Orman provided concept art for the film adaptation of The Little Prince.

=== Upcoming projects ===
In 2013, Van Orman announced on Twitter that he was creating a new series titled North Woods. This was confirmed in a 2014 BuzzFeed article.

In June 2024, Rovio Entertainment announced that Van Orman will serve as executive producer and screenwriter for The Angry Birds Movie 3.

== Personal life ==
Van Orman has been married to his wife Sherri since 1999. They have two daughters: Blossom and Hazel.

== Inspirations ==
Artists who have influenced Van Orman include Joe Murray, Gary Larson, Jim Henson, Stephen Hillenburg, Craig McCracken, E. H. Shepard, Richard Scarry, Maurice Sendak, Mercer Mayer, Ronald Searle, Robert Crumb, Sergio Aragonés and Max Fleischer.

== Filmography ==
=== Film ===
Year	Title	Role
2015	The Little Prince	Concept artist
2019	The Angry Birds Movie 2	Director
2026	The Angry Birds Movie 3 †	Screenwriter, executive producer

=== Television ===
==== As crew ====
Year	Title	Role
2004	The Powerpuff Girls	Story, storyboard artist, and writer
2004–05	The Grim Adventures of Billy & Mandy	Story, storyboard artist, storyboard revisionist
2005–07	Camp Lazlo	Writer, storyboard artist, and storyboard director
2008–10	The Marvelous Misadventures of Flapjack	Creator, executive producer, story, writer, storyboard artist, director
2010–11	Adventure Time	Supervising producer, story (season 2)
2013–14	Sanjay and Craig	Supervising producer, creative consultant
2016–18	Home: Adventures with Tip & Oh	Co-developer, story, writer, executive producer
2019, 2022	Amphibia	Voice actor, special thanks

==== As actor ====
Year	Title	Role	Notes
2008–10	The Marvelous Misadventures of Flapjack	Flapjack / Background Singer / Additional voices	46 episodes
2011–18	Adventure Time	Tree Witch / Kent / Wishy	3 episodes
2012–16	Gravity Falls	Gideon Gleeful	9 episodes
2013–14	Sanjay and Craig	Additional voices	8 episodes
2016–18	Home: Adventures with Tip & Oh	Krunkle	1 episode
2016	Amphibia	Sprig Plantar	Pilot only
2018–20	Rise of the Teenage Mutant Ninja Turtles	Todd Capybara	7 episodes
2022	Battle Kitty	Memory Monster	1 episode
2023	Kiff	Little Louis	2 episodes
2024	Universal Basic Guys	Barry	2 episodes
2025	Adventure Time: Fionna and Cake	Wishy / Spider	1 episode

=== Video game ===
==== As actor ====
Year	Title	Role	Notes
2011	Cartoon Network: Punch Time Explosion	FlapJack	Grouped under "Featuring the Voice Talents Of"(Wii, Xbox 360, PlayStation 3)
