= Pendleton Ward =

American animator

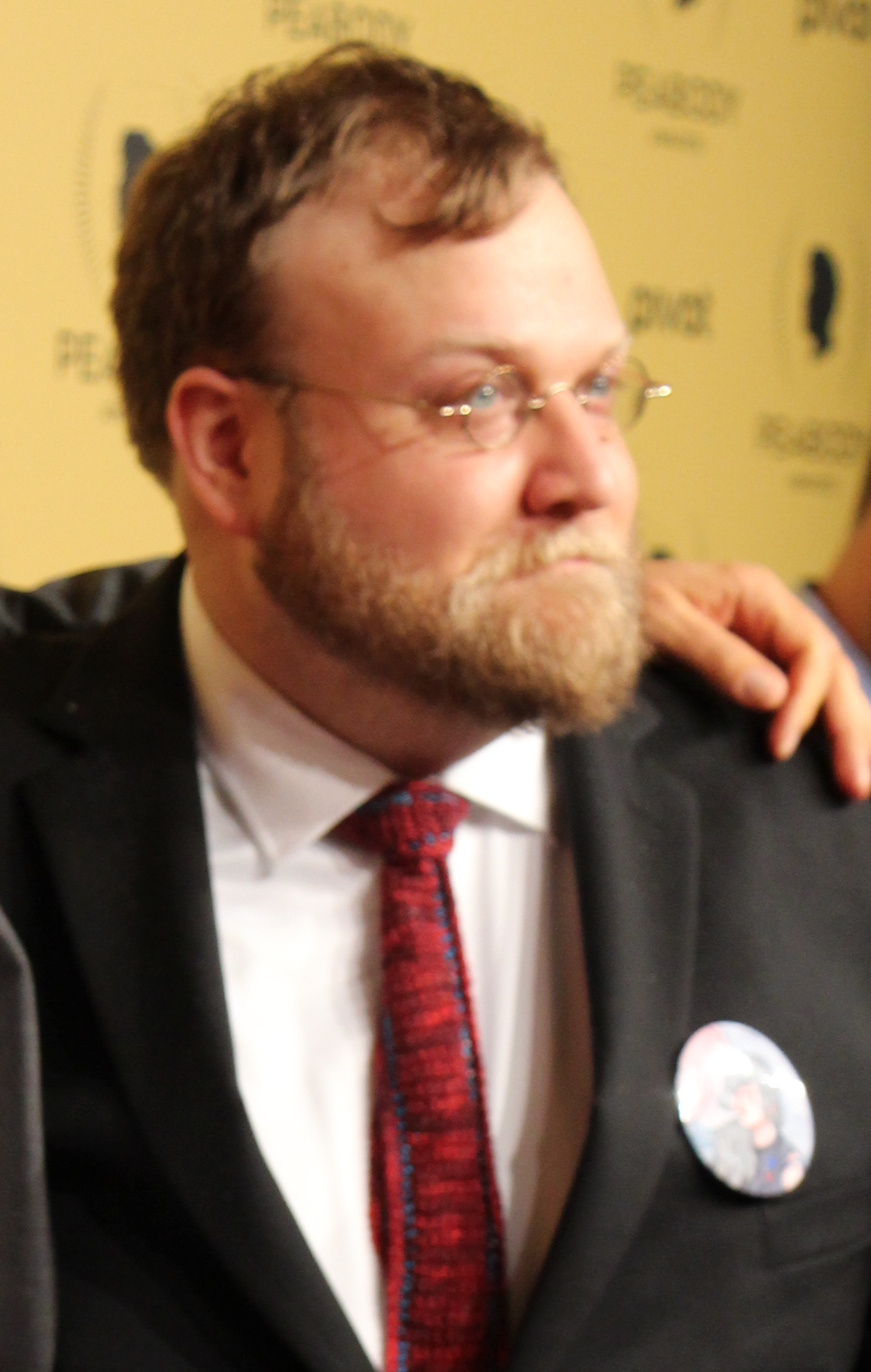
- Ward at the 2015 Peabody Awards
- Born: Ward Taylor Pendleton Johnston; San Antonio, Texas, U.S.
- Education: California Institute of the Arts (BFA)
- Occupations: Animator; writer; producer; director; voice actor
- Writing career
- Pen name: Pen Ward; buenothebear
- Years active: 2002–present
- Genres: Science fantasy Adventure; Comedy drama
- Notable works: Adventure Time; Bravest Warriors; The Midnight Gospel

Ward Taylor Pendleton Johnston, known professionally as Pendleton Ward, is an American animator, screenwriter, producer, director, and voice actor who has worked for Cartoon Network Studios, Frederator Studios, and Netflix Animation. He created the television series Adventure Time, the web series Bravest Warriors, and the adult animated series The Midnight Gospel.

== Early life ==
Ward grew up in San Antonio, Texas and is the youngest of three brothers. His mother Bettie (born 1947) is an artist.

Ward became interested in animation at an early age, inspired by his mother, who is an artist and worked with animators. He started drawing flipbooks in first grade. He graduated from North East School of the Arts in San Antonio.

Ward attended CalArts, where he became friends with J. G. Quintel and Alex Hirsch. They later worked on The Marvelous Misadventures of Flapjack together. Eric Homan, vice president of Frederator Studios, offered Ward a job at the studios after watching one of his films at the annual CalArts animation screenings. Ward is a graduate of the school's Animation Program.

== Career ==
In 2002–2003, Ward published a webcomic titled Bueno the Bear. He later took down the comics because he thought they were "terrible". However, he retains the name "buenothebear" for his website and his handle on sites such as X. Ward created a student film titled Barrista starring Bueno the Bear, released in 2005 on Channel Frederator.

Ward continued to work on short animations for Frederator's Random! Cartoons, which aired on the Nicktoons Network. There he worked with several people who would later join him on the Adventure Time series, including composer Casey James Basichis, Adam Muto and Niki Yang, many of whom had attended the California Institute of the Arts alongside Pen. His two shorts were The Bravest Warriors and the Adventure Time animated short. The Adventure Time short was made in 2006 and went on to become an internet phenomenon in 2007, with over a million views by November of that year. Ward initially pitched Adventure Time to Nickelodeon, but was rejected. It also took some time before Cartoon Network decided to pick it up.

In 2007, Ward was hired to work on the first season of Cartoon Network's The Marvelous Misadventures of Flapjack as a writer and storyboard artist. Created by Thurop Van Orman, Flapjack was a storyboard-driven show which allowed the storyboard artists to write all the dialogue and draw all the action based on an outline assigned to them. The artists each worked in pairs; Ward was partnered up with Mike Roth (who became the supervising producer of Regular Show) and later Alex Hirsch (who has since gone on to create Gravity Falls and develop Fish Hooks). Pen credits his experience with Flapjack and working under Orman's "fun factory" philosophy as having had a significant impact upon his own writing process.

In 2012, Frederator Studios developed Bravest Warriors and turned it into a web series for the relaunch of Cartoon Hangover, however Ward has little involvement in the series. Former Adventure Time lead designer Phil Rynda worked on the redesigns of the characters for the series. The series premiered during the fall of 2012 through Cartoon Hangover's YouTube channel alongside a comic book series of the same name by Boom! Studios.

Ward released a short animation in support of LA Game Space that November, a project intending to build a games-focused exhibition space in Los Angeles. Ward announced development of a short game with Bennett Foddy entitled Cheque Please intended to be part of Experimental Game Pack 01, which the organization released in 2013.

Sometime during the fifth season of Adventure Time, Ward abruptly stepped down as showrunner, explaining it was negatively affecting his "quality of life". In the October 2, 2014 edition of the Rolling Stone magazine, Ward stated "I quit because it was driving me nuts". However, he continued to work as one of the show's writers and storyboard artists until the end of season six, and still served as an executive producer up until the series finale. In an interview with IndieWire prior to the debut of season seven, head writer Kent Osborne noted that Ward had stopped writing episode outlines at the beginning of season 7 but still looked over them and provided input.

In 2017, Ward was credited as "Story Consultant" for the current hard-cover adventure for the 5th Edition of Dungeons & Dragons, "Tomb of Annihilation".

In 2019, Card of Darkness, an Apple Arcade exclusive game, was released with Ward serving as art director.

On March 16, 2020, a trailer was released for the adult animated Netflix original show The Midnight Gospel, co-created by Ward and comedian Duncan Trussell. The plot reads, "Clancy is a space-caster who uses a multiverse simulator to interview beings living in other worlds." Eight episodes of the show were released on Netflix on April 20, 2020.

In 2021, Ward was credited with special thanks in the Double Fine-developed video game Psychonauts 2. Allegedly, Ward created an animatic that expressed interest in having the opening of the game be about a pregnant Raz; this can be seen in-game in the level "Hollis' Hot Streak", where players are made to shoot a pen at a sign that spells out "Ward".

At the inaugural Children's and Family Emmy Awards ceremony held in 2022, Ward and colleagues received an Emmy for "Outstanding Directing for an Animated Program" (alongside Ako Castuera, Luis Grane, Elizabeth Ito, and Bob Logan) for their work in City of Ghosts.

In November 2024, Adult Swim debuted the pilot of Mystery Cuddlers, co-created by Ward with Jack Pendarvis.

On June 12, 2025, Adult Swim announced that Ward alongside Rebecca Sugar, Ian Jones-Quartey and Patrick McHale were developing a new animated special under the title "The Elephant". The animated special, which was released on December 19, 2025, is in three acts, and is 20 minutes long.

In 2026 on the 9th episode of the 22nd series of Taskmaster, Ward did animation for one of the tasks.

== Filmography ==
=== Television ===
Year	Title	Role
2008–2009	Random! Cartoons	Director, storyboard artist and character designer Episodes: "Adventure Time", "Bravest Warriors" and "6 Monsters"
2008–2009	The Marvelous Misadventures of Flapjack	Writer and storyboard artist
2010–2018	Adventure Time	Creator, writer, storyboard artist, co-producer (Seasons 1–2), executive producer (Seasons 3–10) and showrunner (Seasons 1–5)
2014	Over the Garden Wall	Writer and storyboard artist Episode: "Songs of the Dark Lantern"
2015	Uncle Grandpa	Director, writer, storyboard artist and writer Episode: "Guest Directed Shorts"
2018	Steven Universe	Storyboard artist Episode: "Familiar"
2020	The Midnight Gospel	Co-creator, director, writer, storyboard artist and executive producer
2020–2021	Adventure Time: Distant Lands	Creator
2021	City of Ghosts	Director and writer Episode: "Bob & Nancy"
2022	Bee and PuppyCat	Writer; Episode: "Gentle Touch" and "Funny Lying"
2023–present	Adventure Time: Fionna and Cake	Creator
2024	Mystery Cuddlers	Co-creator, director, writer, storyboard artist and executive producer Pilot
2025	Adult Swim's The Elephant	Creator, screenwriter, animator Television special
2026	Adventure Time: Side Quests	Writer and storyboard artist Episode: "Rescue Princess"

=== Web ===
Year	Title	Role
2012–2013	Animation Pals	Animator
2012–2018	Bravest Warriors	Creator
2014, 2016	Bee and PuppyCat	Animatic editor, voice director and writer Episodes: "Food" and "Toast"

=== Short film ===
Year	Title	Role
2003	Bueno in the Rye	Student film; Director, writer and animator
2004	Sex Dogs!	Student film; Director, writer and animator
2007	Barrista	Director, writer and animator
2008	Dr. Tran	Animator
2011	Pikapew Poop Chu	Director, Story, animatic and soundmixing

=== Voice acting roles ===
Year	Title	Role	Notes
2007	Barrista	Bueno the Bear / Sasha	Short film
2008	Random! Cartoons	Abraham Lincoln / Old Man	Episode: "Adventure Time"
2009	The Marvelous Misadventures of Flapjack	Rower #1 / Sail Boss	Episode: "Ben Boozled"
2010–2018	Adventure Time	Lumpy Space Princess / Shelby / Abraham Lincoln / Additional voices	85 episodes
2011	Pikapew Poop Chu	Ash / Brock	Short film
2012	Bravest Warriors	Computer	Episode: "Emotion Lord"
2012–2013	Animation Pals	Dr. Katz	6 episodes
2014	Broken Age	Gus	Video Game
2015	Uncle Grandpa	Uncle Grandpa / Pizza Steve	Episode: "Guest Directed Shorts"
2016	The Simpsons	Couch Gag singer	Episode: "Monty Burns' Fleeing Circus"
2020–2021	Adventure Time: Distant Lands	Lumpy Space Princess / Additional voices	3 episodes
2023	Adventure Time: Fionna and Cake	Ellis P. / Lumpy Space Princess / Additional Voices	13 episodes
2026	Adventure Time: Side Quests	Lumpy Space Princess	

== Influences ==
Ward has previously stated that his friends, many of whom he works alongside on Adventure Time, are his biggest drawing and animating influences. In another interview, he explained that he was influenced by shows like The Ren & Stimpy Show, Beavis and Butt-Head, and The Simpsons. He would later go on to be a couch gag singer in the latter show's episode "Monty Burns' Fleeing Circus" in Season 28.

The French fantasy comic books Dungeon, created by Joann Sfar and Lewis Trondheim, also inspired Pendleton Ward for the creation of Adventure Time, as he mentioned in Dungeon comics reviews : "Dungeon comics - that's a big inspiration for me and the crew who write on the show. Dungeon's a great comic, and I look to it for the sort of casual conversation they have with the big fantasy world that they all live in." —Adventure Time's Pendleton Ward.
