= Reign of Gunters =

- Adventure Time episode
- Episode no.: Season 4 Episode 24
- Directed by: Larry Leichliter (Note: Director); Nate Cash (Note: Creative director); Nick Jennings (Note: Art director)
- Written by: Ako Castuera; Jesse Moynihan
- Story by: Patrick McHale; Kent Osborne; Pendleton Ward; Adam Muto
- Production code: 1008-102
- Original air date: October 8, 2012
- Running time: 11 minutes

Episode chronology
← Previous "The Hard Easy"	Next → "I Remember You"
- Adventure Time season 4

"Reign of Gunters" is the twenty-fourth episode of the fourth season of the American animated television series Adventure Time. The episode was written and storyboarded by Ako Castuera and Jesse Moynihan, from a story by Patrick McHale, Kent Osborne, Pendleton Ward, and Adam Muto. It originally aired on Cartoon Network on October 8, 2012.

The series follows the adventures of Finn (voiced by Jeremy Shada), a human boy, and his best friend and adoptive brother Jake (voiced by John DiMaggio), a dog with magical powers to change shape and grow and shrink at will. In this episode, after stealing a demonic wishing eye, Gunter the penguin creates clones of himself which cause chaos when he tries to take over the Candy Kingdom. Eventually the Ice King (voiced by Tom Kenny) arrives and halts Gunter's reign.

The impetus for this episode was a scene that appeared in the second season premiere, "It Came from the Nightosphere" that features Marceline's dad confronting Gunter the penguin. The episode was seen by 1.845 million viewers. The episode, however, received mixed reviews from critics. Oliver Sava of The A.V. Club felt that the story did not expand upon Gunter's character; rather he felt that it played out as one long joke.

== Plot ==
After Gunter (voiced by Tom Kenny) manages to steal the Ice King's (voiced by Kenny) Demonic Wishing Eye, he creates magical clones of himself with which he uses to take over Ooo. Meanwhile, the Ice King journeys to Wizard City to buy a new Demonic Wishing Eye only to be accosted and nearly killed by Laser Wizard, Bufo, and Forest Wizard, who are members of some sort of secret wizard society.

Finn and Jake are soon attacked in their treehouse by the magical Gunter clones, which are also able to shape-shift. The duo observe that Gunter and his army have seemingly conquered the entirety of Ooo, save for the Candy Kingdom. The two rush to the aid of Princess Bubblegum (voiced by Hynden Walch), only to see Gunter, assisted by his laser-shooting kitten, conquer the city in one fell swoop. It is revealed that Gunter only wants to conquer the world to satisfy his love of breaking bottles. Finn offers a large number of bottles to Gunter in an attempt to placate him, but Gunter shatters them all immediately and turns his attention to the Candy Kingdom's glass-headed Gumball Guardians.

Gunter and his army are nearly about to crack the glass heads of the Gumball Guardians, when the Ice King arrives and notices that Gunter has the Demonic Wishing Eye he has been searching for. He scolds Gunter by spraying him with water, commanding him to return the Eye. Gunter removes the Eye, which causes the Gunter clones to vanish.

== Production ==
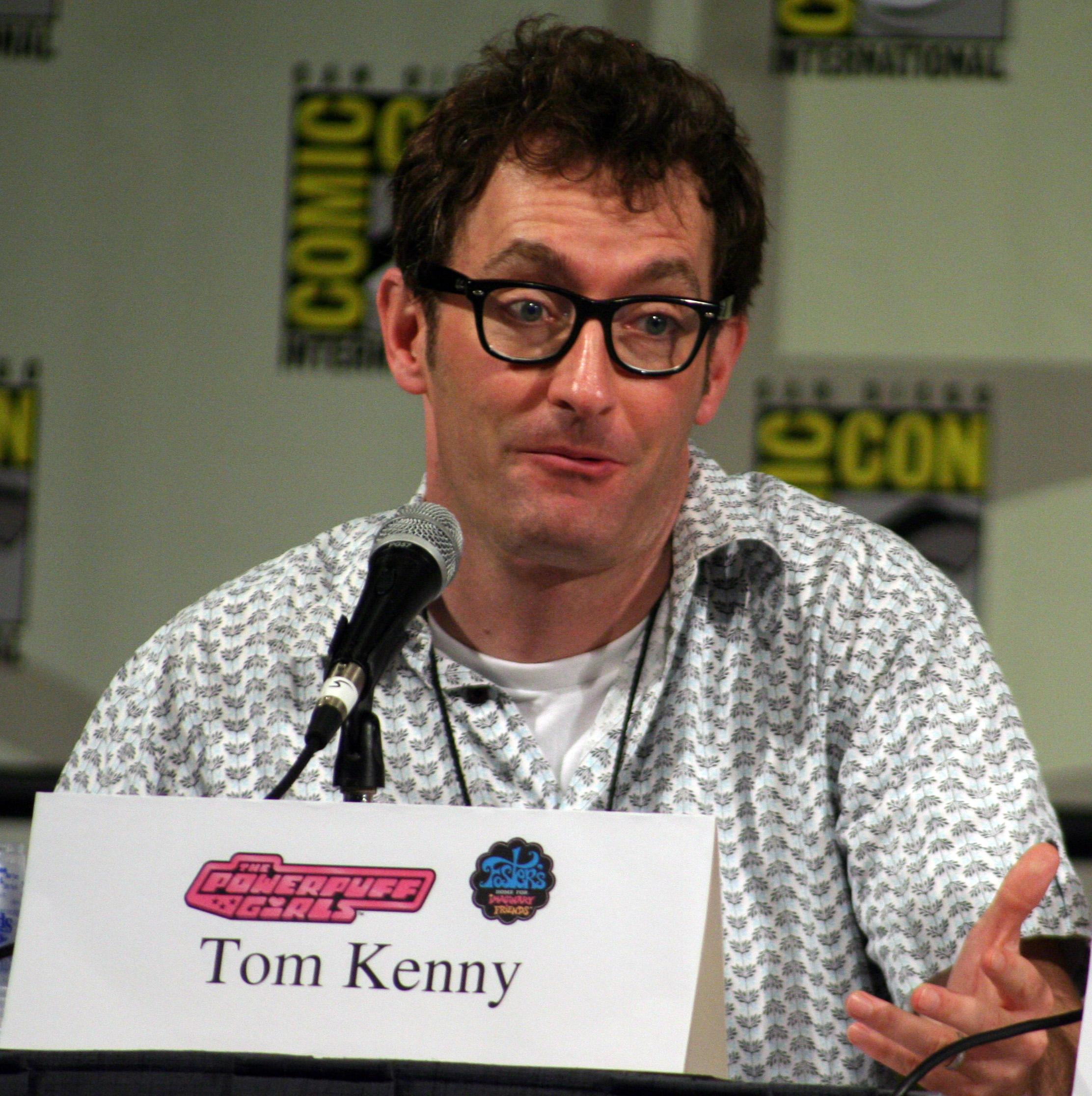
Gunter is voiced by Tom Kenny.

"Reign of Gunters" was written and storyboarded by Ako Castuera and Jesse Moynihan, from a story developed by series creator Pendleton Ward, Patrick McHale, Kent Osborne, and Adam Muto. The episode was directed by Larry Leichliter, with Nate Cash serving as creative director, and Nick Jennings serving as art director.

The impetus for this episode was a scene that appeared in the second season premiere, "It Came from the Nightosphere" that features Marceline's dad confronting Gunter the penguin and calling him "the most evil thing [he has] encountered." The opening of the episode, in which Gunter attempts to get the Ice King to brush him, was based on Castuera's cat, Katie, who would often want to be brushed. During the scene in which the Ice King browses the Internet, lead character designer Andy Ristaino added humorous previous search terms, and he designed the web site to look as if it were from the turn of the millennium.

The episode introduces Wizard City, a hidden magical settlement that would later be featured in the season 5 episode Wizards Only, Fools. Denizens of Wizard City featured in Reign of Gunters include: Bufo, voiced by Tom Kenny; Forest Wizard, voiced by Ward; and Lazer Wizard, voiced by Tom Kenny. The episode also introduces Huntress Wizard. The original design for the character, crafted by Ako, resembled a female wrestler. Michelle Xin, however, redesigned the character to resemble a plant-based female archer. Moynihan also placed one of his comic character in the background of the city, but changed the design so that Cartoon Network would not own the rights to the character.

The scene in which Gunter's kitten begins to float and shoot lasers in order to incapacitate the Candy Kingdom was pitched by Ward and only begrudgingly added into the episode by Moynihan; in the commentary track to the episode, Moynihan admitted that he initially thought the idea was too silly, but eventually came to like it. The scene in which Jake rebuilds a broken bottle was re-storyboarded by Ward after he decided he wanted to make Jake reconstruct it to a beat. Because of the number of poses, the scene ended up taking more time than is usual to draw.

== Reception ==
"Reign of Gunters" first aired on Cartoon Network on October 8, 2012. The episode was seen by 1.845 million viewers, and received a 1.3 household rating. This means it was seen by 1.3 percent of all households watching television at the time of the episode's airing. The episode first saw physical release as part of the 2014 DVD, Princess Day, which included 16 episodes from the series' second through sixth seasons. It was later re-released as part of the complete fourth season DVD in October 2014.

Oliver Sava of The A.V. Club awarded the episode a "C+". Sava compared the installment to the previous fourth season episode "BMO Noire", but noted that while the latter "builds a story around one of the supporting character that is primarily defined by being cute and lonely", "Reign of Gunters" does not "add anything to the character [of Gunter], making it feel like a one-off joke stretched to fill 10 minutes." He also felt that it would have been more enjoyable to watch the action unfold between Ice King and the secret wizard society, because he felt that the action taking place at the Candy Kingdom, while fun, was not very exciting. Despite this, Sava noted that the best part of the episode was when Finn explains to Jake that he is keeping his lady friends in a "state of confusion" in order to pursue potential romantic relationships with them in the future.
