= Goliad (disambiguation) =

Goliad is a city in Goliad County, Texas, United States.

Goliad may also refer to:

- Goliad County, Texas, United States
  - Goliad Declaration of Independence, signed in Mexican Texas
  - The Goliad massacre during the Texas revolution
  - Battle of Goliad, skirmish during the Texas revolution
  - Goliad Campaign, 1836 Mexican offensive
  - Goliad Formation, rock formation in Texas
- "Goliad" (Adventure Time), a television episode
