= Return to the Nightosphere and Daddy's Little Monster =

"Return to the Nightosphere" and "Daddy's Little Monster"
- Adventure Time episodes
- Episode nos.: Season 4 Episodes 5 & 6
- Directed by: Larry Leichliter (Note: Director); Nate Cash (Note: Creative director, "Return to the Nightosphere"); Adam Muto (Note: Creative director, "Daddy's Little Monster"); Nick Jennings (Note: Art director)
- Written by: Ako Castuera (Note: Storyboard artist, "Return to the Nightosphere"); Jesse Moynihan; Rebecca Sugar (Note: Storyboard artist, "Daddy's Little Monster"); Cole Sanchez
- Story by: Patrick McHale; Kent Osborne; Pendleton Ward
- Production codes: 1008-085; 1008-086
- Original air date: April 30, 2012
- Running time: 22 minutes

Guest appearance
- Martin Olson as Hunson Abadeer

Episode chronology
← Previous "Dream of Love"	Next → "In Your Footsteps"
- Adventure Time season 4

"Return to the Nightosphere" and "Daddy's Little Monster" are the fifth and sixth episodes of the fourth season of the American animated television series Adventure Time. "Return to the Nightosphere" was written and storyboarded by Ako Castuera and Jesse Moynihan, whereas "Daddy's Little Monster" was written and storyboarded by Rebecca Sugar and Cole Sanchez. Both episodes' stories were developed by series creator Pendleton Ward, Patrick McHale, and Kent Osborne. Originally airing on Cartoon Network on April 30, 2012, both episodes feature the return of Martin Olson as Hunson Abadeer.

The series follows the adventures of Finn (voiced by Jeremy Shada), a human boy, and his best friend and adoptive brother Jake (voiced by John DiMaggio), a dog with magical powers to change shape and grow and shrink at will. In "Return to the Nightosphere", Finn and Jake discover that they are trapped in the Nightosphere, a hellish dimension ruled by Hunson Abadeer, Marceline's (voiced by Olivia Olson) father, although they cannot seem to remember how they arrived. "Daddy's Little Monster" features Finn and Jake discovering that Hunson Abadeer has turned Marceline into a giant demon. The duo manage to save Marceline.

"Daddy's Little Monster" features two songs: "Not Just Your Little Girl" and "Political Rap". The latter of the two, which went on to become particularly popular with fans of the series on the Internet, was written by Moynihan and intended for the episode "Return to the Nightosphere". Together with other episodes of Cartoon Network programming, the episodes helped the network rank number one in a number of demographics on the night of April 30. Both episodes received largely positive critical reviews.

== Plot ==
=== "Return to the Nightosphere" ===
Finn and Jake awake in a prison cell full of bananas, confused and unaware of how they arrived at their location. A demonic prison guard tells them that they are in the Nightosphere, the hellish realm ruled by Marceline's (voiced by Olivia Olson) father, Hunson Abadeer (voiced by Martin Olson). The two set off to locate Marceline's father and navigate back to their home dimension. Traversing the Nightosphere, Finn and Jake learn that they need to seek an audience with Hunson Abadeer if they want to leave. Eventually, they reach a line composed of demons who seek petitions from their demonic overlord. Just then, a storm cloud appears in a mist, slaying all the demons present; Finn and Jake barely escape death.

Afterwards, the two follow the cloud to a castle. There, the cloud condenses into a demonic form, presumably Hunson Abadeer. While running through the castle, Finn and Jake find a portal back to Ooo, and the two jump in, with Abadeer in pursuit. Finn wounds the demon with his sword. At that moment it is revealed that the demon is not Hunson Abadeer, but rather Marceline, who has for some unknown reason, been transformed into a hideous demon. She musters enough strength to forbid Finn and Jake from coming back to the Nightosphere, and, after the two are teleported back to their dimension, she closes the portal.

=== "Daddy's Little Monster" ===
In the tree fort, Jake charges his cell phone and discovers footage that he filmed prior to Finn and him waking up in a jail cell in the Nightosphere; apparently, Marceline had invited Finn and Jake to party in the Nightosphere, wherein she was given a demonic amulet by Hunson, which turned her into a being of pure evil.

Determined to save Marceline, Finn and Jake disguise themselves as demons and sneak back into the Nightosphere by creating a portal that sends them to the seat of government for Marceline's regime. Marceline, in her evil demon form, listens to the requests of her subjects, often ignoring what they seek and instead punishing them with macabre torture. Finn and Jake are spotted by Marceline, who gives chase. After narrowly avoiding their demonic friend, the duo run into the now-benign Hunson Abadeer, who explains that he only wanted Marceline to follow in his footsteps and rule the hellish realm.

Finn and Jake later rile up the apathetic demon masses by performing a "political rap", which instigates anarchy. Finn manages to rip the amulet off of Marceline, which renders her unconscious. To escape the rebellious demon masses, Finn puts the amulet on and pushes Marceline and Jake through the portal. Hunson Abadeer arrives on the scene and rips the amulet from Finn's neck, sending Finn falling back through the portal. Marceline is initially disappointed in her father for tricking her into ruling the Nightosphere to make him proud, but they reconcile when Hunson reassures Marceline that he is proud of her, no matter what she does, and that he actually enjoys Finn and Jake.

== Production ==
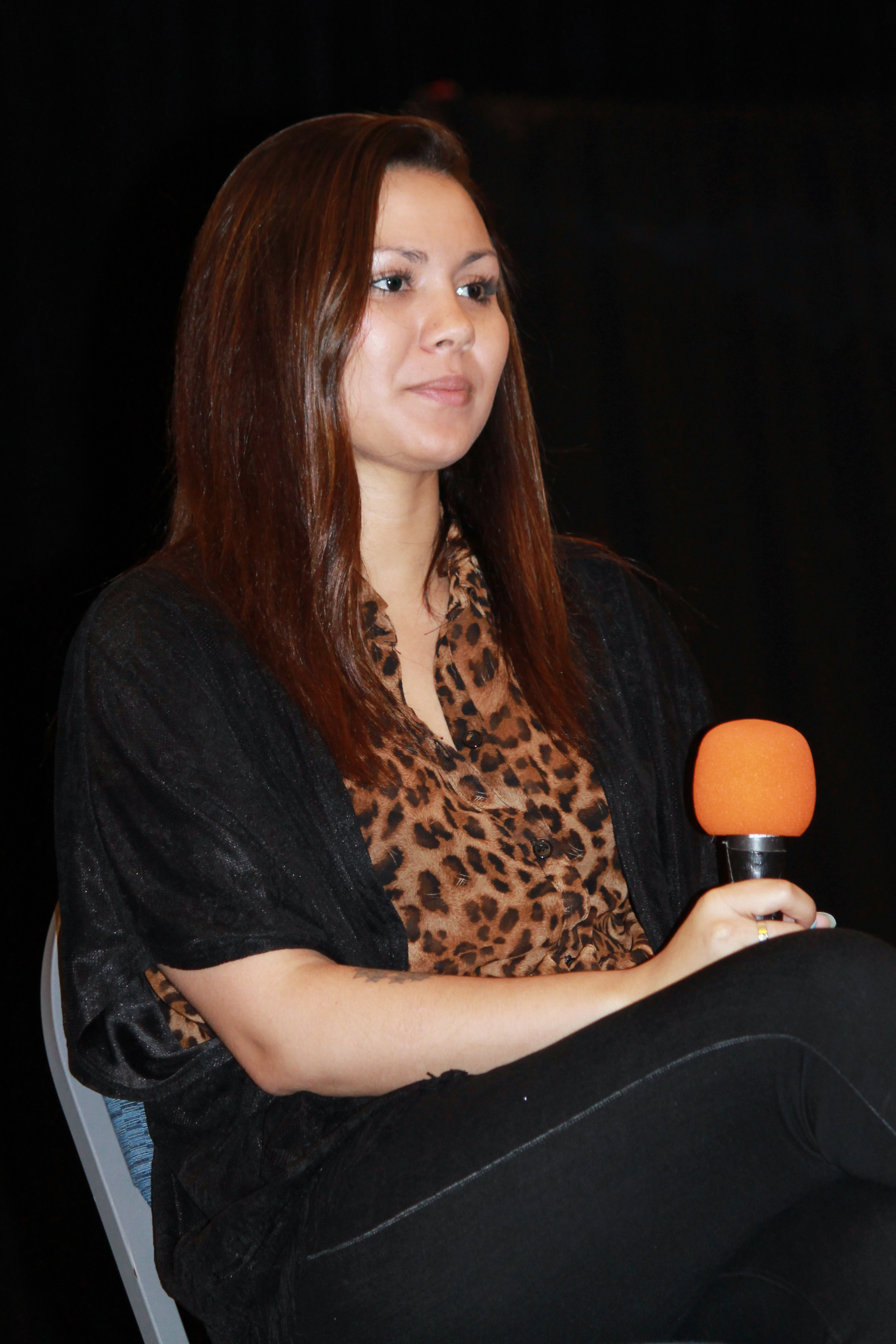
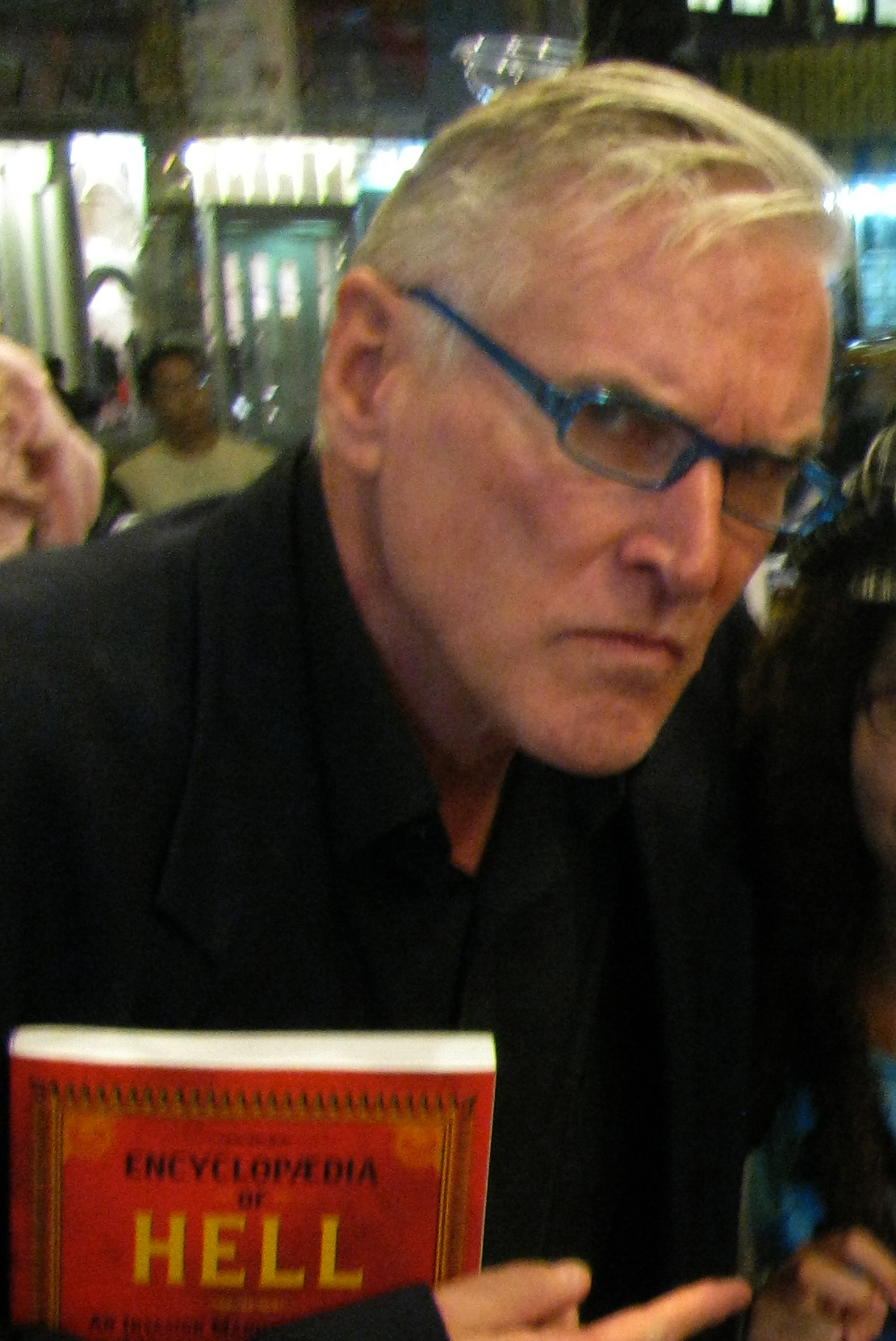
Olivia Olson (left), who voices Marceline, enjoyed working on the episode because she was able to record her lines with her father, Martin Olson (right).

"Return to the Nightosphere" (which was originally known as "Finn and Jake Go to Hell" during early production) was written and storyboarded by Ako Castuera and Jesse Moynihan, whereas "Daddy's Little Monster" was written and storyboarded by Rebecca Sugar and Cole Sanchez. The stories for both episodes were developed by series creator Pendleton Ward, Patrick McHale, and Kent Osborne, and both were directed by Larry Leichliter, with Nick Jennings serving as art director. Nate Cash served as creative director for "Return to the Nightosphere" and Adam Muto served as creative director for "Daddy's Little Monster".

For "Return to the Nightosphere", Moynihan designed a long pan for the shot in which Finn and Jake survey the entirety of the Nightosphere. Moynihan enjoyed designing these sorts of ambitious, long pans, and he had created a similar one for the second season episode "Death in Bloom". Unfortunately, during production, his drawing got lost three times, although it was finally located. As for "Daddy's Little Monster", an original version of the episode featured Hunson Abadeer pretending to be sick so that Marceline would feel sorry and take over his job. However this plot was later discarded. The beginning of the episode features Finn and Jake reviewing footage captured on Jake's camera phone. Ward noted that it was difficult to keep the action lively, while also framing the scene as if it were stationary phone footage.

"Daddy's Little Monster" features several songs, including "Not Just Your Little Girl", written by Sugar. Sugar and Sanchez originally tried writing the song—which was originally to be called the "Cone Zone"—together, but Sugar eventually completely rewrote it. When it came time to storyboard the episode, Sanchez with the help of former storyboard artist and then-creative director Adam Muto, storyboarded the scene, and Ward asked Sugar to record a quick demo of the song for reference. She filmed herself recording the demo, but jokingly noted that she asked "Pen and Cole to face the other way" out of embarrassment. The political rap featured in "Daddy's Little Monster", written by Moynihan, was originally intended for "Return to the Nightosphere", but was cut for time. Sugar, however, liked the song so much that she insisted it be added to "Daddy's Little Monster". Moynihan was pleased with the largely positive critical reception the rap had from fans of the series.

Martin Olson, the father of voice actress Olivia Olson, reprises his role as Hunson Abadeer in "Return to the Nightosphere" and "Daddy's Little Monster"; Olson had previously appeared in the second season premiere "It Came from the Nightosphere" and the third season episode "Memory of a Memory". The episode was also the first to give a name to Marceline's father: Hunson Abadeer. According to Moynihan, the name was inspired by the name that his brother had given their family's car when they were growing up. The two later used it for a band that only recorded one song. To create the demonic effect of Marceline talking while possessed with the amulet, Olivia Olson and her father were required to say their lines in tandem. She later explained: "We were going back-and-forth, line to line … We were screaming back and forth at each other, and trying to match pitches and stuff. Then, hearing the after product of both of our voices blended together was pretty fun."

== Reception ==
"Return to the Nightosphere" and "Daddy's Little Monster" first aired on Cartoon Network on April 30, 2012. Together with other episodes of Cartoon Network programming, the episodes helped make the network the number one television destination for boys aged 2–11, 6–11, and 9–14 on Monday nights, according to Nielsen ratings. The episodes first saw physical release as part of the complete fourth season DVD in October 2014.

Phil Dyess-Nugent of The A.V. Club awarded both "Return to the Nightosphere" and "Daddy's Little Monster" an "A", noting that, "If the last few episodes of Adventure Time … struck anyone as being a little short on adventure, or, at least, action, tonight’s epic two-parter went a long way toward making up for it." He applauded the installments embracement of dark humor, as well as its fixation with striking visual designs, describing the titular Nightosphere as "a goofed-up Hieronymous Bosch landscape". In regards to "Daddy's Little Monster", Dyess-Nugent noted that the high-point was the "freestyle political rap" that Finn and Jake ad-lib to get the demons to help them.

In an interview with The Mary Sue on August 2, 2013, Olivia Olson claimed that both "Return to the Nightosphere" and "Daddy's Little Monster" were the most fun episodes for her to record, largely due to the manner in which she and her father had to record their lines in tandem.
