= You Make Me (disambiguation) =

"You Make Me" is a 2013 song by Avicii.

You Make Me may also refer to:

- "You Make Me" (Day6 song), 2021
- "You Make Me", a song by "Weird Al" Yankovic from the album Even Worse, 1988
- "You Make Me", a song by Itzy from the EP It'z Me, 2020

== See also ==
- "You Made Me", a 2012 episode of the fourth season of Adventure Time
