= Who Would Win =

- Adventure Time episode
- Episode no.: Season 4 Episode 21
- Directed by: Larry Leichliter (Note: Director); Nate Cash (Note: Creative director); Nick Jennings (Note: Art director)
- Written by: Ako Castuera; Jesse Moynihan
- Story by: Patrick McHale; Kent Osborne; Pendleton Ward
- Production code: 1008-097
- Original air date: September 3, 2012
- Running time: 11 minutes

Guest appearances
- Tom Gammill as The Farm; Matthew Broderick as Dream Warrior

Episode chronology
← Previous "You Made Me"	Next → "Ignition Point"
- Adventure Time season 4

"Who Would Win" is the twenty-first episode of the fourth season of the American animated television series Adventure Time. The episode was written and storyboarded by Ako Castuera and Jesse Moynihan, from a story by Patrick McHale, Kent Osborne, and Pendleton Ward. It originally aired on Cartoon Network on September 3, 2012.

The series follows the adventures of Finn (voiced by Jeremy Shada), a human boy, and his best friend and adoptive brother Jake (voiced by John DiMaggio), a dog with magical powers to change shape and grow and shrink at will. In this episode, Finn and Jake challenge a monster named The Farm to fight, but they end up battling each other. Eventually, they repair their friendship and win the fight.

The episode, which guest stars Tom Gammill as The Farm and Matthew Broderick as the Dream Warrior, addresses several different themes, including whether Finn could conceivably hold his own against his physically stronger brother, and perhaps more abstractly, whether willpower can overcome physical limitations. The episode was met with mostly positive critical reviews.

== Plot ==
While exploring a desert wasteland, Finn and Jake encounter a large creature that calls itself The Farm; it is challenging various contenders to best it in combat, but none are able to do so. Both Finn and Jake decide that they want to beat The Farm, so they start training. However, Jake loses interest quickly and reverts to playing Kompy's Kastle, his favorite video game. This angers Finn so much that he breaks the game, which throws Jake into a fit of rage.

The two proceed to fight one another in an increasingly violent way, until both are unfit to fight The Farm; despite this, they both challenge the creature anyway, who promptly defeats them and knocks them unconscious. However, while knocked out, both Finn and Jake are visited by a mysterious Dream Warrior (voiced by Matthew Broderick), who gives them the advice that they need—albeit in the form of riddles—to defeat The Farm; he tells them to use cheap fighting moves to obscure the creatures vision, pull down his pants, and bite his buttocks. Finn and Jake, working together, use the dream warriors techniques and are victorious.

== Production ==
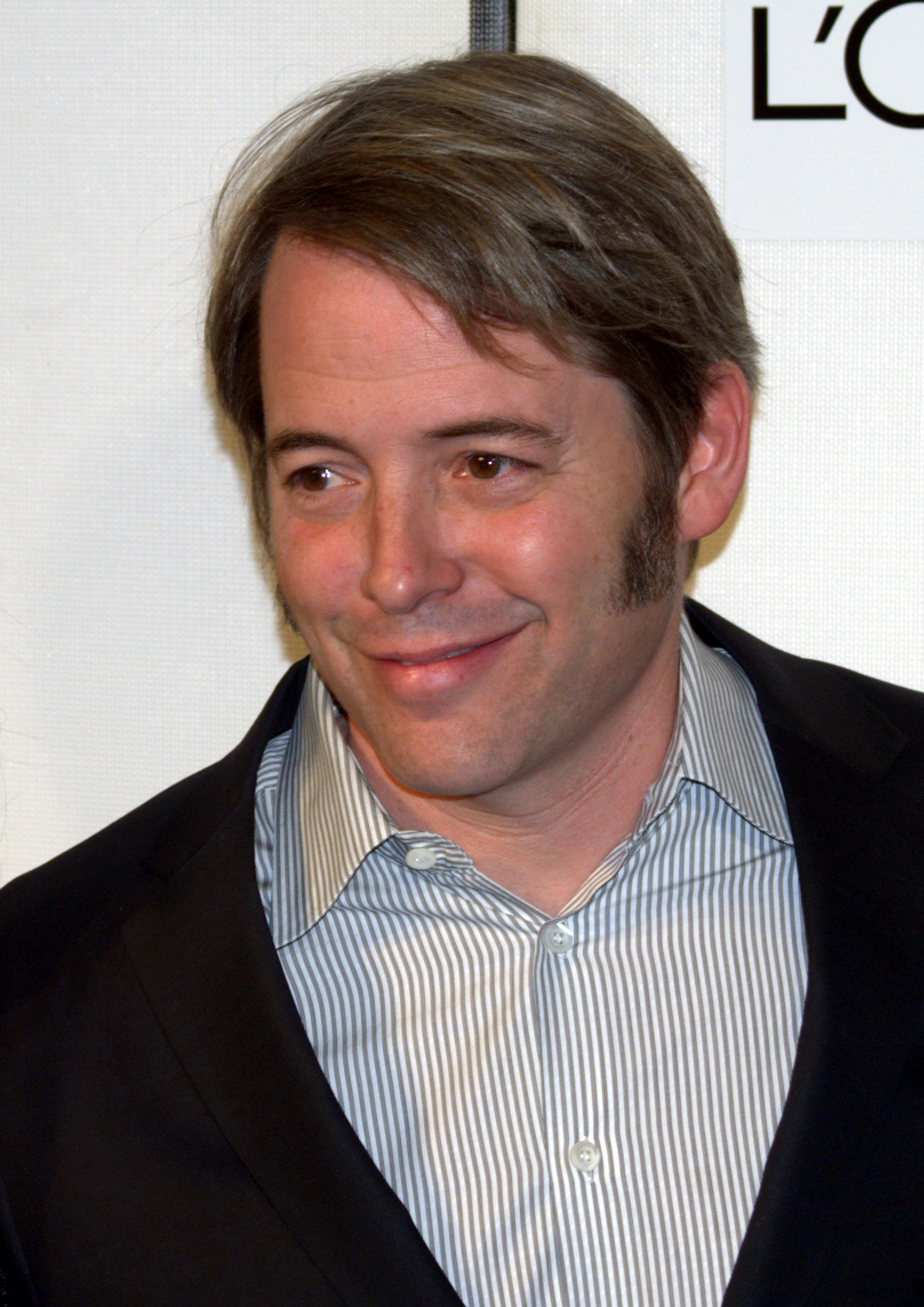
Matthew Broderick, who portrays the Dream Warrior, was introduced to the series by his son, James.

"Who Would Win" was written and storyboarded by Ako Castuera and Jesse Moynihan, from a story developed by series creator Pendleton Ward, Patrick McHale, and Kent Osborne. The episode was directed by Larry Leichliter. A couple of the opening frames were storyboarded by Tom Herpich; both Herpich and Moynihan had been at a comic book convention, and Herpich, who was bored, asked Moynihan if he could start the storyboard for "Who Would Win" as a way to pass the time.

According to Moynihan, the episode revolves around several themes, such as whether Finn could hold his own against the seemingly unstoppable Jake in a fight, and the idea of willpower overcoming physical limitations. The dream sequence featuring the Dream Warrior was based on several spiritual ideas, such as dream journeying, and finding you spirit animal and power totems. Near the beginning of the episode, Finn expresses interest in body modification. Moynihan inserted this reference to maintain continuity with the second season episode "Mortal Folly", which features a scene with Finn daydreaming that he has a bionic arm.

The episode guest stars both Tom Gammill and Matthew Broderick. Gammill plays The Farm, a character that both Ward and Moynihan expressed an interest in bringing back to the show the DVD commentary for the episode. Broderick plays the Dream Warrior; he was introduced to the series by his son James. He later noted in an interview that he liked that Adventure Time "doesn't talk down to anybody."

== Reception ==
"Who Would Win" first aired on Cartoon Network on September 3, 2012. The episode first saw physical release as part of the complete fourth season DVD in October 2014.

Oliver Sava of The A.V. Club awarded the episode an "A−", applauding the installment's exploration and incorporation of Finn and Jake's friendship. He compared "Who Would Win" to the previous fourth season episode, "Sons of Mars", noting that both episode manage to "incorporate the show’s psychedelic imagery and silly toilet humor into stories that build on the relationship between the two bros [sic]." In terms of the action sequences in the episode, Sava also argued that the fight was paced similar to the fights between Peter Griffin and The Giant Chicken in the Fox animated sitcom Family Guy.
