= Adventure Time season 4 =

Adventure Time
- Season 4
- DVD cover
- Showrunner: Pendleton Ward
- Starring: Jeremy Shada; John DiMaggio
- No. of episodes: 26

Release
- Original network: Cartoon Network
- Original release: April 2 – October 22, 2012

Season chronology
- ← Previous; Season 3 Next → Season 5

The fourth season of Adventure Time, an American animated television series created by Pendleton Ward, premiered on Cartoon Network on April 2, 2012, and concluded on October 22, 2012. The season follows the adventures of Finn, a human boy, and his best friend and adoptive brother Jake, a dog with magical powers to change shape and size at will. Finn and Jake live in the post-apocalyptic Land of Ooo, where they interact with the other main characters of the show: Princess Bubblegum, The Ice King, Marceline the Vampire Queen, Lumpy Space Princess, BMO, and Flame Princess.

During the production of the season Ward and the series' crew sought to over come what they called the "season four blues" by writing more interesting and different stories than what had previously aired.

The first episode of the season, "Hot to the Touch" was watched by 2.655 million viewers; this marked a slight decrease in viewers watching Cartoon Network when compared to the previous season's debut. The season ended with the cliffhanger "The Lich", which was viewed by 2.589 million viewers; the story was resolved at the start of season five. The season was met with largely positive critical reception. In addition, several episodes were nominated for awards; the episodes "Princess Cookie", "The Hard Easy", "Lady & Peebles", and "Goliad" were all nominated for Annie Awards. The episode "Card Wars" won a Golden Reel Award. Several compilation DVDs that contained episodes from the season were released after the season finished airing. The full season set was released on October 7, 2014, on DVD and Blu-ray.

== Development ==
=== Concept ===
The season follows the adventures of Finn the Human, a human boy, and his best friend and adoptive brother Jake, a dog with magical powers to change shape and grow and shrink at will. Finn and Jake live in the post-apocalyptic Land of Ooo, wherein they interact with the other major characters, including: Princess Bubblegum, The Ice King, Marceline the Vampire Queen, Lumpy Space Princess, BMO, and Flame Princess. Common storylines revolve around: Finn and Jake discovering strange creatures, battling the Ice King, and battling monsters in order to help others. Multi-episode storylines for this season include Finn attempting to woo Flame Princess, and the Lich using the Enchiridion to open a multidimensional portal in his quest to destroy all life in the multiverse.

=== Production ===
On April 6, 2011, Eric Homan announced through Frederator's official blog that, although he was unable to "confirm nor deny" whether the series had been renewed for a fourth season, "if there were a fourth season planned [...] writing would begin next week." On April 28, 2011, Ward officially announced that, with the storyboards for season three nearing completion, much of the production staff had shifted its focus onto the show's fourth season. The first episode to enter into production was "Five Short Graybles", based on its production number. However, it was later the second episode aired.

During the writing for the season, Ward and series' head writer Kent Osborne noted that it was increasingly difficult to produce new episode concepts because the writers had "already used a lot of cool ideas". Osborne called this slump the "season four blues". Ward went on to clarify that, "everything's still coming out super weird and interesting—but it just gets a little harder. You have to dig deeper." To combat these issues, the writer staff tried different story writing methods, such as a technique called exquisite corpse, in which one writer starts a story on a sheet of paper, and the paper is folded and another writer tries to finish it. Ward, however, noted that "the ideas are usually terrible". They also decided to experiment with different types of storytelling and to introduce more new characters to the show.

This season's episodes were produced in a process similar to those of the previous seasons. Each episode was outlined in two-to-three pages that contained the necessary plot information. These outlines were then handed to storyboard artists, who created full storyboards. (Note: Information regarding story development and storyboard artists is taken from the opening credits of the season's twenty-six episodes.) Design and coloring were done at Cartoon Network Studios in Burbank, California, and animation was handled overseas in South Korea by Rough Draft Korea and Saerom Animation. Ward was proud with the writing staff for the season, saying, "Everyone [on the writing staff] is super talented [...] And they're all a bunch of brainiacs, super smart". He explained that "They're amazing in helping us because they let us write really cool ideas [because] they're really supportive, is what I am trying to say, of what we're trying to do."

== Cast ==
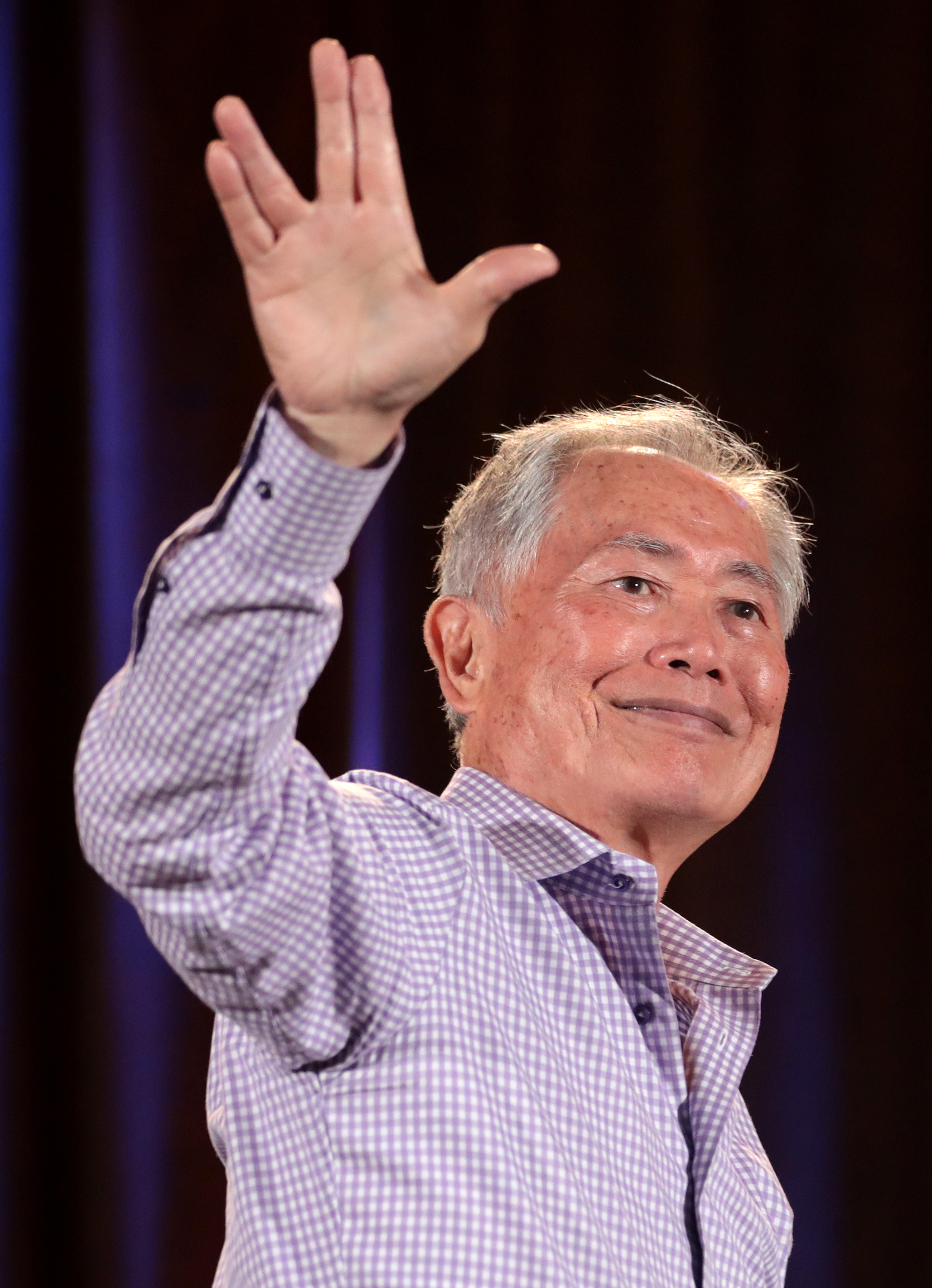
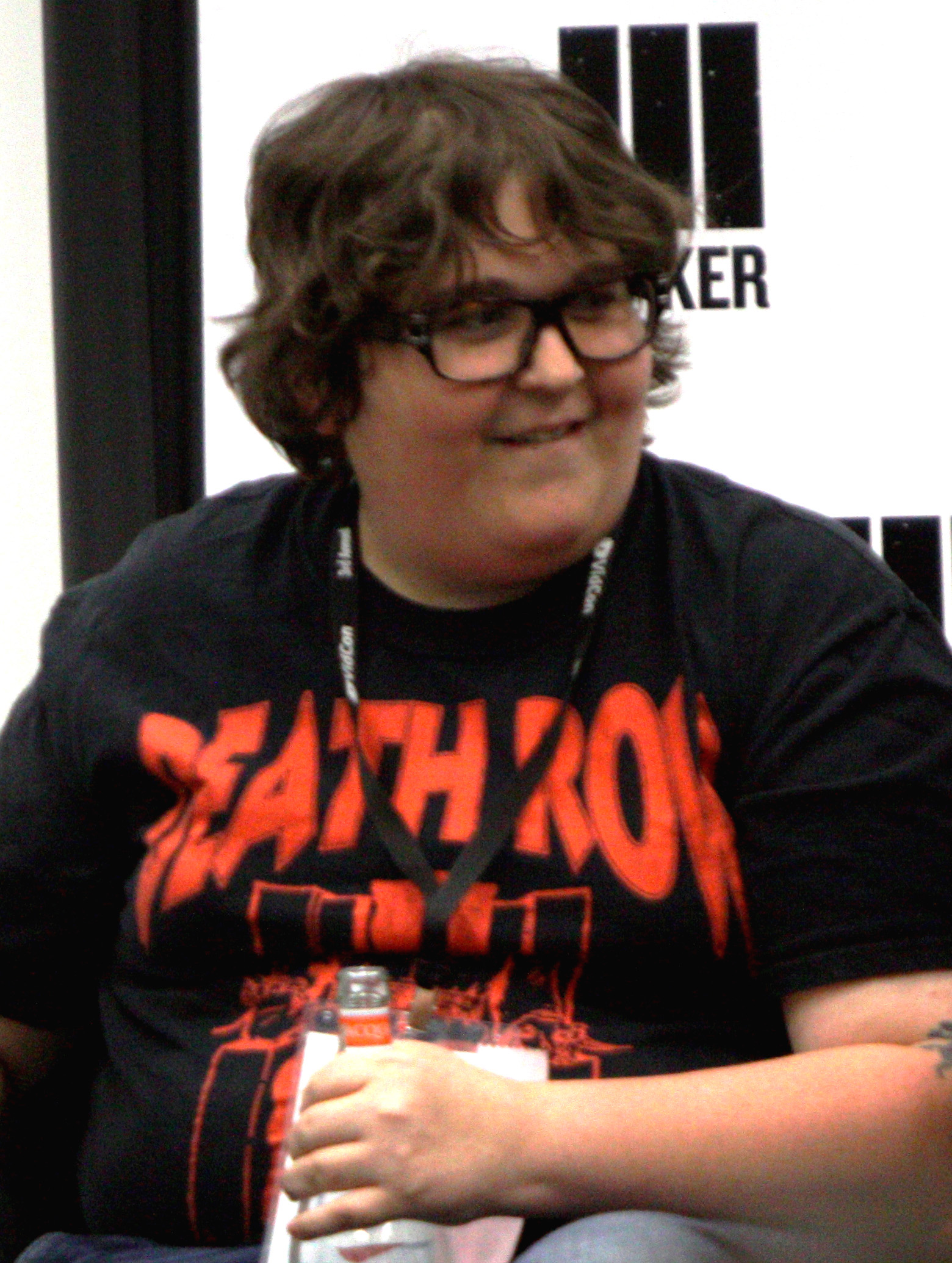
Season four of Adventure Time featured many returning guest stars, such as George Takei (left) and Andy Milonakis (right) among others.

The voice actors for the season include: Jeremy Shada (Finn the Human), John DiMaggio (Jake the Dog), Tom Kenny (The Ice King), Hynden Walch (Princess Bubblegum), and Olivia Olson (Marceline the Vampire Queen). Ward himself provides the voice for several minor characters, as well as Lumpy Space Princess. Former storyboard artist Niki Yang voices the sentient video game console BMO, as well as Jake's girlfriend Lady Rainicorn in Korean. Polly Lou Livingston, a friend of Pendleton Ward's mother, Bettie Ward, plays the voice of the small elephant Tree Trunks. Jessica DiCicco voices Flame Princess, who becomes Finn's new romantic interest. Season four also features the reappearance of The Lich, the series' principal antagonist. The Lich is portrayed by Ron Perlman. The Adventure Time cast records their lines together as opposed to doing it individually. This is to capture more natural sounding dialogue among the characters. Hynden Walch has described these group session as akin to "doing a play reading—a really, really out there play."

Several voice actors and actresses reprise their characters in this season. Andy Milonakis returns as N.E.P.T.R. in "Hot to the Touch" and "BMO Noire". Ron Lynch again voices Pig in "Dream of Love". Martin Olson reprises his role as Hunson Abadeer in the two-parter episode "Return to the Nightosphere" / "Daddy's Little Monster". Miguel Ferrer voices Death in "Sons of Mars". In the same episode, Ward voices Abraham Lincoln, a throw-back to the series' pilot episode. Erik Estrada again voices the titular character in "King Worm". George Takei voices the anthropomorphic heart villain Ricardio in "Lady & Peebles". Justin Roiland returns as the Earl of Lemongrab in "You Made Me"; the episode would also see him voice Lemongrab's genetically created twin. Keith David once again voices the Flame King in "Ignition Point". Lou Ferrigno returns in "The Lich" to voice Billy.

Emo Philips makes his debut as Cuber in the episode "Five Short Graybles". Bobcat Goldthwait and Susie Essman voice the spider couple in "Web Weirdos". Writer Graham Linehan's daughter Wendy appears as the titular character in "Goliad", and Linehan's son Henry voices Stormo. Donald Faison lends his voice to the character Baby-Snaps in "Princess Cookie". Tom Gammill, Melissa Villaseñor, Kenny, and Ferrer voice the four-headed deity Grob Gob Glob Grod in "Sons of Mars". Matthew Broderick voices the Dream Warrior in "Who Would Win", and Gammill returns in the same episode as The Farm. Paul F. Tompkins appears as Furnius in "Ignition Point". Both Brian Doyle-Murray and Jonathan Katz lend their voices to the episode "The Hard Easy" as Prince Huge and the Mud Scamp elder, respectively. Katz was originally supposed to voice a character in the previous season, but had to bow out due to a scheduling conflict.

Various other characters are voiced by Tom Kenny, Dee Bradley Baker, Maria Bamford, Steve Little, and Kent Osborne.

== Broadcast and reception ==
=== Ratings ===
The season debuted on April 2, 2012, with the episode "Hot to the Touch". The episode was watched by 2.655 million viewers. This marked a slight decrease from the third-season premiere, which had been viewed by 2.686 million viewers. The episode was number one among kids aged 2–11, 6–11, and 9–14, as well as boys aged 2–11, 6–11 and 9–14. The season's sixteenth episode, "Burning Low" was seen by 3.504 million viewers, making it the most-watched episode of the series to air. The twenty-third episode of the season, "The Hard Easy", was the 100th episode produced of the entire show, although it was the 101st aired. It aired on October 1, 2012. The season finale, "The Lich", aired on October 22, 2012, and was viewed by 2.589. It ranked as the number one television episode in its timeslot among all kids aged 2–11, 6–11, and 9–14, and all boy demographics. This season moved to Mondays at 7:30 pm. The first three seasons aired on Mondays at 8:00 pm.

=== Reviews and accolades ===
Mike LeChevallier of Slant Magazine awarded the fourth season of the show four stars out of five. In the review, LeChevallier positively complimented the show for "growing up" with its characters, and that "the show's dialogue is among the best of any current animated series." He concluded that the series possesses "strikingly few faults". Season four was the first season that was reviewed by The A.V. Club; reviewer Oliver Sava wrote that in its fourth year, the show "transformed into a different beast" and that it was the show's "strongest season yet". Each episode was graded by The A.V. Club with a different letter grade; the season received three C's, eight B's, and thirteen A's.

Four of the season's episodes were nominated for Annie Awards. "Princess Cookie" was nominated Best Animated Television Production For Children, "The Hard Easy" was nominated for Design in an Animated Television/Broadcast Production, and "Lady & Peebles" and "Goliad" were both nominated for Storyboarding in an Animated Television/Broadcast Production. None of the episodes managed to win, however. The episode "Card Wars" won a Golden Reel Award for Best Sound Editing: Sound Effects, Foley, Dialogue and ADR Animation in Television.

== Episodes ==
No. overall	No. in season	Title	Directed by	Written and storyboarded by	Original release date	Prod. code	US viewers (millions)
79	1	"Hot to the Touch"	Larry Leichliter^{d} Adam Muto^{c}	Cole Sanchez & Rebecca Sugar	April 2, 2012	1008-082	2.66
Finn (voiced by Jeremy Shada) develops a crush on Flame Princess (voiced by Jessica DiCicco) and tries to get to know her, which proves difficult due to her destructive and uncontrollable power.
80	2	"Five Short Graybles"	Larry Leichliter^{d} Nate Cash^{c}	Tom Herpich, Skyler Page & Cole Sanchez	April 9, 2012	1008-079	N/A
A series of short stories—concerning BMO (voiced by Niki Yang), Finn and Jake (voiced by John DiMaggio), Princess Bubblegum (voiced by Hynden Walch), the Ice King (voiced by Tom Kenny), and Lumpy Space Princess (voiced by Pendleton Ward)—all centered around a common theme of the five senses, hosted by a mysterious man named Cuber (Emo Philips) from the future.
81	3	"Web Weirdos"	Larry Leichliter^{d} Nate Cash^{c}	Ako Castuera & Jesse Moynihan	April 16, 2012	1008-081	N/A
Finn must help a grumpy spider couple (voiced by Bobcat Goldthwait and Susie Essman) reconcile before he and Jake are eaten.
82	4	"Dream of Love"	Larry Leichliter^{d} Adam Muto^{c}	Bert Youn & Somvilay Xayaphone	April 23, 2012	1008-080	N/A
Tree Trunks (voiced by Polly Lou Livingston) is courted by Pig (voiced by Ron Lynch), but their over-expressive love begins to make many people uncomfortable.
83	5	"Return to the Nightosphere" (Part 1)	Larry Leichliter^{d} Nate Cash^{c}	Ako Castuera & Jesse Moynihan	April 30, 2012	1008-085	N/A
Finn and Jake awaken with amnesia in the dreaded Nightosphere, buried under a pile of bananas. They seek out the underworld's leader, Marceline's father (voiced by Martin Olson), who apparently is the one who imprisoned them in the first place.
84	6	"Daddy's Little Monster" (Part 2)	Larry Leichliter^{d} Adam Muto^{c}	Cole Sanchez & Rebecca Sugar	April 30, 2012	1008-086	N/A
After discovering that her father tricked her into turning into an evil demon, Finn and Jake attempt to save Marceline. Jake learns a disturbing secret of the world's bananas.
85	7	"In Your Footsteps"	Larry Leichliter^{d} Nate Cash^{c}	Tom Herpich & Skyler Page	May 7, 2012	1008-083	N/A
A bear befriends Finn. Jake, however, thinks he is trying to steal Finn's identity. At the end of the episode, Finn kindly gives the Enchridion, the Book of Heroes, to the bear, believing he wishes to learn how to be a hero himself; however, it is revealed that the bear is secretly working for the Lich, as he is shown giving the book to the Lich's possessed-snail form.
86	8	"Hug Wolf"	Larry Leichliter^{d} Adam Muto^{c}	Somvilay Xayaphone & Bert Youn	May 14, 2012	1008-084	N/A
After an encounter with an Alpha Hug Wolf, Finn transforms into a Beta Hug Wolf. It is up to Jake to break the curse and turn Finn back to normal before midnight.
87	9	"Princess Monster Wife"	Larry Leichliter^{d} Adam Muto^{c}	Somvilay Xayaphone & Bert Youn	May 28, 2012	1008-088	N/A
When certain body parts of Ooo's many princesses go missing, Finn and Jake decided to confront the Ice King, who shows them a princess he made out of the missing pieces. She is so horribly deformed that Finn and Jake cannot view her directly without fainting.
88	10	"Goliad"	Larry Leichliter^{d} Nate Cash^{c}	Tom Herpich & Skyler Page	June 4, 2012	1008-087	N/A
Princess Bubblegum begins to fear for her mortality, and creates an eternal sphinx named Goliad (voiced by Wendy Linehan) to be her successor. Things go awry, however, when the sphinx turns against Bubblegum.
89	11	"Beyond This Earthly Realm"	Larry Leichliter^{d} Nate Cash^{c}	Ako Castuera & Jesse Moynihan	June 11, 2012	1008-089	N/A
After Finn touches a mysterious lamb statue, he is transported into the "spirit world", inhabited by all sorts of bizarre entities. Desperate to return to reality, Finn turns to the one person who can see him: Ice King.
90	12	"Gotcha!"	Larry Leichliter^{d} Adam Muto^{c}	Cole Sanchez & Rebecca Sugar	June 18, 2012	1008-090	2.39
In order to do research for her tell-all memoir about men, Lumpy Space Princess goes undercover working for Finn and Jake. She eventually learns that Finn is selfless, which makes him "hot on the inside".
91	13	"Princess Cookie"	Larry Leichliter^{d} Nate Cash^{c}	Tom Herpich & Skyler Page	June 25, 2012	1008-091	N/A
Finn and Jake are sent in to rescue the hostages from a rogue cookie Baby-Snaps (voiced by Donald Faison). Things get complicated when Jake begins to sympathize with him; he learns that Baby-Snaps only wants to be a princess, like Bubblegum.
92	14	"Card Wars"	Larry Leichliter^{d} Adam Muto^{c}	Somvilay Xayaphone & Bert Youn	July 16, 2012	1008-092	N/A
Finn and Jake play Card Wars, a tabletop game, in which Jake becomes overly competitive.
93	15	"Sons of Mars"	Larry Leichliter^{d} Nate Cash^{c}	Ako Castuera & Jesse Moynihan	July 23, 2012	1008-093	N/A
When the Martian deity Grob Gob Glob Grod (voiced by Tom Gammill, Miguel Ferrer, Melissa Villasenor, and Tom Kenny) comes to arrest Magic Man (voiced by Tom Kenny) for his crimes, he uses his magic to disguise himself as Jake to escape his trial while having the real Jake take his place.
94	16	"Burning Low"	Larry Leichliter^{d} Adam Muto^{c}	Cole Sanchez & Rebecca Sugar	July 30, 2012	1008-094	3.50
Finn and Jake become convinced that Princess Bubblegum is jealous now that Finn is hanging out with Flame Princess. In reality, Bubblegum is worried that Flame Princess will be unable to withstand romance without burning a hole in the Earth's crust.
95	17	"BMO Noire"	Larry Leichliter^{d} Nate Cash^{c}	Tom Herpich & Skyler Page	August 6, 2012	1008-095	N/A
BMO goes on the hunt for Finn's missing sock.
96	18	"King Worm"	Larry Leichliter^{d} Adam Muto^{c}	Somvilay Xayaphone, Bert Youn, & Steve Wolfhard	August 13, 2012	1008-096	N/A
Finn and Jake find themselves trapped in their own subconscious by the King Worm (voiced by Erik Estrada).
97	19	"Lady & Peebles"	Larry Leichliter^{d} Adam Muto^{c}	Cole Sanchez & Rebecca Sugar	August 20, 2012	1008-098	2.75
Princess Bubblegum and Lady Rainicorn (voiced by Yang) go searching for Finn and Jake, who have been missing for three weeks after fighting with the Ice King. It is revealed that Ricardio (voiced by George Takei), the Ice King's living heart, has trapped them and wishes to marry Bubblegum.
98	20	"You Made Me"	Larry Leichliter^{d} Nate Cash^{c}	Tom Herpich & Jesse Moynihan	August 27, 2012	1008-099	N/A
When Lemongrab (voiced by Justin Roiland) upsets the Candy Kingdom and demands citizens for his isolated castle, Princess Bubblegum sends the Pup Gang. However, Lemongrab is not satisfied with these rude citizens. Bubblegum eventually makes him a twin to rule with.
99	21	"Who Would Win"	Larry Leichliter^{d} Nate Cash^{c}	Ako Castuera & Jesse Moynihan	September 3, 2012	1008-097	N/A
Finn and Jake try to fight a monster known as "The Farm", but after a feud they end up beating each other up. Only a visit from the Dream Lord (voiced by Matthew Broderick) enables them to one-up The Farm.
100	22	"Ignition Point"	Larry Leichliter^{d} Adam Muto^{c}	Somvilay Xayaphone & Bert Youn	September 17, 2012	1008-101	2.26
Finn and Jake disguise themselves as flame citizens and sneak into the Fire Kingdom on a quest for Flame Princess. Once there, they discover a plot to assassinate the Flame King (voiced by Keith David), and try to thwart it.
101	23	"The Hard Easy"	Larry Leichliter^{d} Nate Cash^{c}	Tom Herpich & Skyler Page	October 1, 2012	1008-100	2.64
A group of River Scamps ask Finn and Jake to protect them from the Mega Frog, their predator.
102	24	"Reign of Gunters"	Larry Leichliter^{d} Nate Cash^{c}	Ako Castuera & Jesse Moynihan	October 8, 2012	1008-102	1.85
After stealing a demonic wishing eye, Gunter creates clones of himself, attacks the Candy Kingdom, and attempts to destroy all the glass bottles in Ooo.
103	25	"I Remember You"	Larry Leichliter^{d} Adam Muto^{c}	Cole Sanchez & Rebecca Sugar	October 15, 2012	1008-103	2.54
Ice King and Marceline create a song, and Marceline tries to get the Ice King to remember who he really is. This episode reveals that Marceline and the Ice King knew each other during the atomic war that occurred a thousand years prior, but the Ice King had to leave Marceline because he was going crazy due to the influence of his magical crown.
104	26	"The Lich"	Larry Leichliter^{d} Nate Cash^{c}	Tom Herpich & Skyler Page	October 22, 2012	1008-104	2.59
Finn has an ominous dream about the Lich (voiced by Ron Perlman), and sets off with Jake to warn Billy (voiced by Lou Ferrigno).

- ^d Director
- ^c Creative director

== Home media ==
Warner Home Video released multiple DVD volumes, such as Jake vs. Me-Mow, Fionna and Cake, Jake the Dad, The Suitor, Princess Day, Finn the Human, Frost & Fire, The Enchiridion, and Card Wars which contain episodes from the fourth season. All DVD releases can be purchased on the Cartoon Network Shop, and the individual episodes can be downloaded from both the iTunes Store and Amazon.com.

=== Full season release ===
The full season set was released on DVD and Blu-ray on October 7, 2014.

Adventure Time: The Complete Fourth Season
Set details
Special features
- 26 episodes
  - 2-disc set (DVD)
  - 1-disc set (Blu-ray))
- 1.78:1 aspect ratio
- Subtitles: English
- English (Dolby Stereo)
- Commentaries on all episodes by the crew
  - Featuring Pendleton Ward, Rebecca Sugar, Tom Herpich, Cole Sanchez, Jesse Moynihan, Ako Castuera, Nate Cash, and Andy Ristaino
- "Distant Bands: The Music of Adventure Time" featurette
  Featuring Pendleton Ward, Rebecca Sugar, Patrick McHale, and Jesse Moynihan
Release dates
Region 1
Region 4
Region A
Region B
October 7, 2014
November 12, 2014
October 7, 2014
November 12, 2014
