= Ignition Point =

- Adventure Time episode
- Episode no.: Season 4 Episode 22
- Directed by: Larry Leichliter (Note: Director); Adam Muto (Note: Creative director); Nick Jennings (Note: Art director)
- Written by: Somvilay Xayaphone; Bert Youn
- Story by: Patrick McHale; Kent Osborne; Pendleton Ward
- Production code: 1008-101
- Original air date: September 17, 2012
- Running time: 11 minutes

Guest appearances
- Keith David as Flame King; Paul F. Tompkins as Furnius

Episode chronology
← Previous "Who Would Win"	Next → "The Hard Easy"
- Adventure Time season 4

"Ignition Point" is the twenty-second episode of the fourth season of the American animated television series Adventure Time. The episode was written and storyboarded by Somvilay Xayaphone and Bert Youn, from a story by Patrick McHale, Kent Osborne, and Pendleton Ward. It originally aired on Cartoon Network on September 17, 2012. The episode guest stars Keith David as Flame King and Paul F. Tompkins as Furnius.

The series follows the adventures of Finn (voiced by Jeremy Shada), a human boy, and his best friend and adoptive brother Jake (voiced by John DiMaggio), a dog with magical powers to change shape and grow and shrink at will. In this episode, Finn and Jake sneak into the Fire Kingdom on a quest for the Flame Princess (voiced by Jessica DiCicco). Once there, they discover a plot to assassinate the Flame King, and try to thwart it.

The idea for "Ignition Point" had been developed at a writers meeting, wherein Tom Herpich wanted to focus on political intrigue in the Fire Kingdom. The episode was seen by 2.256 million viewers, and received mostly positive reviews from critics. Oliver Sava of The A.V. Club appreciated how the episode ran the gauntlet from toilet humour to Shakespearean references.

== Plot ==
While spending time with Flame Princess (voiced by Jessica DiCicco), Finn and Jake learn that she misses her scented candles, which she left in the Fire Kingdom. The duo volunteer to retrieve them, but Flame Princess tells them to be careful and watch out for her evil father, Flame King (voiced by Keith David). Once they enter the Flame Kingdom, Finn and Jake manage to acquire the candles, but hear a conspiracy to assassinate the king between two fire beings, one of whom has an untied shoe, and the other has a hissy voice.

Finn and Jake traverse the Flame Kingdom palace, trying to identify the culprits. Eventually, Jake gets the idea to dress up as actors and perform a play wherein they pretend to be the conspirators; this will cause the real assassins to act suspicious. Their plan goes awry, and Flame King believes them to be the actual assassins. However, by a lucky turn of events, Finn and Jake are able to unveil the actual culprits, who are the children of Flame King's brother, whom he murdered to acquire the throne. Finn is concerned that, because her father is truly evil, Flame Princess might be evil as well, but Flame King notes that someone with a good spirit could change her.

== Production ==
"Ignition Point" was written and storyboarded by Somvilay Xayaphone and Bert Youn, from a story developed by series creator Pendleton Ward, Patrick McHale, and Kent Osborne. The origin for the episode was from a writers game. The impetus had been pitched by Herpich, who was interested in "political intrigue in the Fire Kingdom". Originally, he wanted to base it tonally on Game of Thrones, but the ending episode came out more Shakespearean. Adam Muto revealed via Spring.me that the series' writers and producers watched the 1990 comedy-drama Rosencrantz & Guildenstern Are Dead before working on the episode; according to Muto, Osborne is a "pretty big fan."

Many of the character designs used in this episode had been designed by Andy Ristaino for the third season finale "Incendium". According to him, "the Flame Kingdom was one of the first kingdoms that I really got to go nuts with [and] do my own thing." In this episode, Keith David reprises his role as Flame King. In addition, Paul F. Tompkins plays the role of Furnius; he would later play an unrelated character in the fifth season episode "Be More".

== Reception ==
"Ignition Point" first aired on Cartoon Network on September 17, 2012. The episode was seen by 2.256 million viewers, and received a 0.5 rating in the 18–49 demographic. This means it was seen by 0.5 percent of all 18- to 49-year-olds watching television at the time of the episode's airing. The episode first saw physical release as part of the complete fourth season DVD in October 2014.

Oliver Sava of The A.V. Club awarded the episode an "A−", rhetorically asking, "What show other than Adventure Time could begin with farts and end with Shakespeare?" He argued that "Ignition Point" represented an Adventure Time episode "with everything: toilet humor, romance, drama, non-sequiters [sic], and even some moral philosophizing." Sava also felt that the episode, with its overt references to Hamlet, furthered the show's tendency to be "daddy-crazy", and illustrate that "the female characters [in the series] tend to have horrible father figures".
