= Burning Low =

- Adventure Time episode
- The Title Card of Burning low which in context is the opposite of the Incendium title card with Princess Bubblegum appearing to mourn Finn instead of Finn mourning Princess Bubblegum
- Episode no.: Season 4 Episode 16
- Directed by: Larry Leichliter (Note: Director); Adam Muto (Note: Creative director); Nick Jennings (Note: Art director)
- Written by: Cole Sanchez; Rebecca Sugar
- Story by: Patrick McHale; Kent Osborne; Pendleton Ward
- Production code: 1008-094
- Original air date: July 30, 2012
- Running time: 11 minutes

Episode chronology
← Previous "Sons of Mars"	Next → "BMO Noire"
- Adventure Time season 4

"Burning Low" is the sixteenth episode of the fourth season of the American animated television series Adventure Time. The episode was written and storyboarded by Cole Sanchez and Rebecca Sugar, from a story by Patrick McHale, Kent Osborne, and Pendleton Ward. It originally aired on Cartoon Network on July 30, 2012.

The series follows the adventures of Finn, a human boy, and his best friend and adoptive brother Jake, a dog with magical powers to change shape and grow and shrink at will. In this episode, Finn and Jake become convinced that Princess Bubblegum is jealous of Finn's relationship with Flame Princess. But In reality, Bubblegum knows that Flame Princess's elemental matrix can't deal with extreme romance without burning a hole from Earth's crust to Earth's planetary core where Flame Princess will be thrown around by gravity until Flame Princess melts the Earth inside the planetary core.

The episode, which heavily deals with themes revolving around love and emotion, was originally light on humor, which necessitated series' creative director Adam Muto to insert various jokes and gags. The episode also features the short song "Bacon Pancakes", which has since become a fan favorite. "Burning Low" was seen by 3.504 million viewers, making it the highest-rated episode of Adventure Time that has ever aired and had viewing data. Critically, the episode was met with positive reviews.

== Plot ==
Although Finn and Flame Princess have been in a relationship for a while, Finn is unable to do more than hug her. Jake suggests that the next stage in a relationship is kissing. Eventually, Princess Bubblegum discovers that Finn and Flame Princess are together, which terribly worries her; Flame Princess's elemental matrix is unstable, and if Finn tries to kiss her, she might react so violently that she would burn a hole through the core of the planet.

Bubblegum tries to warn Finn and Jake, but Finn leaves, and Jake mistakes Bubblegum's warnings as signs of jealousy. He eventually tells Finn, who is unsettled. Finn decides that, in order to get a kiss from Flame Princess, he will need to compose a poem; while writing, he is confronted by Bubblegum, who tries to explain the situation. Finn, however, also misinterprets Bubblegum's warning for jealousy, and angrily reproaches the princess for toying with his feelings.

Bubblegum arrives upset at Finn and Jake's tree house, and Jake again believes that she is being jealous of Finn's relationship with Flame Princess. When she finally manages to explain to Jake why they can't be together, they barge out of the tree house to stop them. When they arrive, they see Finn reading his poem to Flame Princess, and subsequently kissing, which creates a massive heat explosion, and Flame Princess begins to fall through the hole, burning everything in her path. Finn regains consciousness and ties Jake's arm to himself and descends down the hole. He passes out from the extreme heat. On the surface, Jake covers the hole with his body, to which Bubblegum explains to him he must keep doing it to deprive Flame Princess from oxygen to put her out. She gets sufficiently cold to enable Finn to regain consciousness, and Jake pulls them both out. To prevent further damage, Finn and Flame Princess both kiss a rock to represent them kissing.

== Production ==
"Burning Low" was written and storyboarded by Cole Sanchez and Rebecca Sugar, from a story developed by series creator Pendleton Ward, Patrick McHale, and Kent Osborne. When it came time for Sanchez and Sugar to pitch the episode for approval, Adam Muto, one of the series' creative directors, expressed discontent with the fact that the episode contained hardly any jokes. Sugar later noted on the DVD commentary that her heart "broke" due to the criticism. Ward defended Sanchez and Sugar's treatment of the episode, noting that the story was "heavy drama". To compensate for such a heavy story, Muto himself added several jokes and gags throughout, such as the reference to President Porpoise.

The themes of the episode, dealing with romance and emotion, posed a challenge for the writers. Sanchez, who was responsible for storyboarding out the first half of the episode, attempted to treat the subject delicately and in a way that did not reveal the twist that Bubblegum was not interested in Finn, but rather worried about the ramifications of Flame Princess's emotional instability. Sugar, on the other hand, was excited to storyboard Finn and Bubblegum's confrontation. She later noted that she tried to fill the scene with as much emotion as she could. An extended joke near the beginning of the episode involves Jake explaining the "tiers" of a relationship to Finn, with Tier 1 being hugging and Tier 15 presumably being sexual intercourse. Sanchez had drafted out ideas for almost every tier, which, according to Sugar, were of "varying levels of acceptability for children's television". Because so many of the people involved with the series were pitching in jokes for this section, Sanchez later claimed that the tier scene was really an amalgamation of various writers.

The episode also features the short song "Bacon Pancakes", which was written by Sugar in an extremely short period of time. In an interview, she noted that she initially had reservations about the song, because she thought fans would dislike it for its simplistic nature.

== Reception ==
“Burning Low” first aired on Cartoon Network on July 30, 2012. It was seen by 3.504 million viewers, and was the thirteenth most-viewed cable show for the week ending August 6. "Burning low" was the highest highest-rated episode premiere of Adventure Time with ratings data available. The episode first saw physical release as part of the 2013 DVD, Jake the Dad, which included 16 episodes from the series' fourth and fifth seasons. It was later re-released as part of the complete fourth season DVD in October 2014.

Oliver Sava of The A.V. Club awarded the episode a "B+", writing that "this week’s story is a great example of how this show takes a common issue and puts a fantastic spin on it." He applauded the episode and the series at large for managing to take a straightforward moral and twisting it into a bizarre and absurd direction. He concluded: "While 'Burning Low' is an episode that may not be as insane as this show’s usual fare, it tells a personal, emotional story that will resonate with viewers of any age."
