= BMO Noire =

- Adventure Time episode
- Title Card
- Episode no.: Season 4 Episode 17
- Directed by: Larry Leichliter (Note: Director); Nate Cash (Note: Creative director); Nick Jennings (Note: Art director)
- Written by: Tom Herpich; Skyler Page
- Story by: Patrick McHale; Kent Osborne; Pendleton Ward
- Production code: 1008-094
- Original air date: August 6, 2012
- Running time: 11 minutes

Guest appearance
- Andy Milonakis as N.E.P.T.R.

Episode chronology
← Previous "Burning Low"	Next → "King Worm"
- Adventure Time season 4

"BMO Noire" is the seventeenth episode of the fourth season of the American animated television series Adventure Time. The episode was written and storyboarded by Tom Herpich and Skyler Page, from a story by Patrick McHale, Kent Osborne, and Pendleton Ward. It originally aired on Cartoon Network on August 6, 2012. The episode guest stars Andy Milonakis as N.E.P.T.R.

The series follows the adventures of Finn (voiced by Jeremy Shada), a human boy, and his best friend and adoptive brother Jake (voiced by John DiMaggio), a dog with magical powers to change shape and grow and shrink at will. In this episode, animated to emulate the style of a crime noir film, BMO (voiced by Niki Yang) goes on the hunt for Finn's missing sock.

The episode is largely carried by the voice acting of Yang. Because so much of the dialogue was delivered by her, and she had to voice several different characters, Yang noted that she had trouble sleeping the day before she was scheduled to record. According to Nielsen ratings, the episode ranked as the number one telecast of the day among all boy demographics aged 2–11 and 6–11. The episode received largely positive reviews from critics, who particularly lauded Yang’s voice performance.

== Plot ==
While leaving for an excursion, Finn announces to Jake that he cannot find his missing sock, BMO decides to treat the situation like an old-time crime case, donning the persona of a hardboiled detective. BMO first talks to Ronnie, a mouse, and the topic soon turns to Lorraine, a chicken, and an apparent former love interest of BMO's. Following Ronnie's advice, BMO ventures to the pantry, but is almost locked inside. Once BMO escapes, Officer Davis, a cat, threatens to arrest BMO for interfering with police business.

BMO, ignoring Officer Davis' threat, heads over to Lorraine's. When BMO suggests that Ronnie took it, she laughs at the idea, saying that if Ronnie were man enough to take a sock she would not be spending her nights with Bebe; eventually, Lorraine confesses that Bebe was the one who stole the sock. Unbeknownst to either, Ronnie was hiding near the rafters and overheard the conversation. BMO heads to Bebe's, a supposed dance club downtown, and interrogates, who Bebe denies knowing anything about the sock. BMO goes to wash soot off of its hands, but when BMO gets back Bebe is dead and the police have arrived. BMO runs from the cops, but trips and falls down the tree fort's ladder, hitting its head.

While unconscious, BMO has a strange dream. Eventually, BMO wakes up, and after a brief talk with N.E.P.T.R. (voiced by Andy Milonakis) realizes that a sock's worth of treasure was missing from that tree fort. At first, BMO thinks that Ronnie took the sock to carry the treasure, killed Bebe so he would not tell anyone, and pinned it on BMO. But he soon begins to suspect it was Lorraine; BMO confronts the chicken, who confesses to framing Ronnie and Bebe. Finn and Jake eventually return, and BMO presents them with the newfound sock.

== Production ==
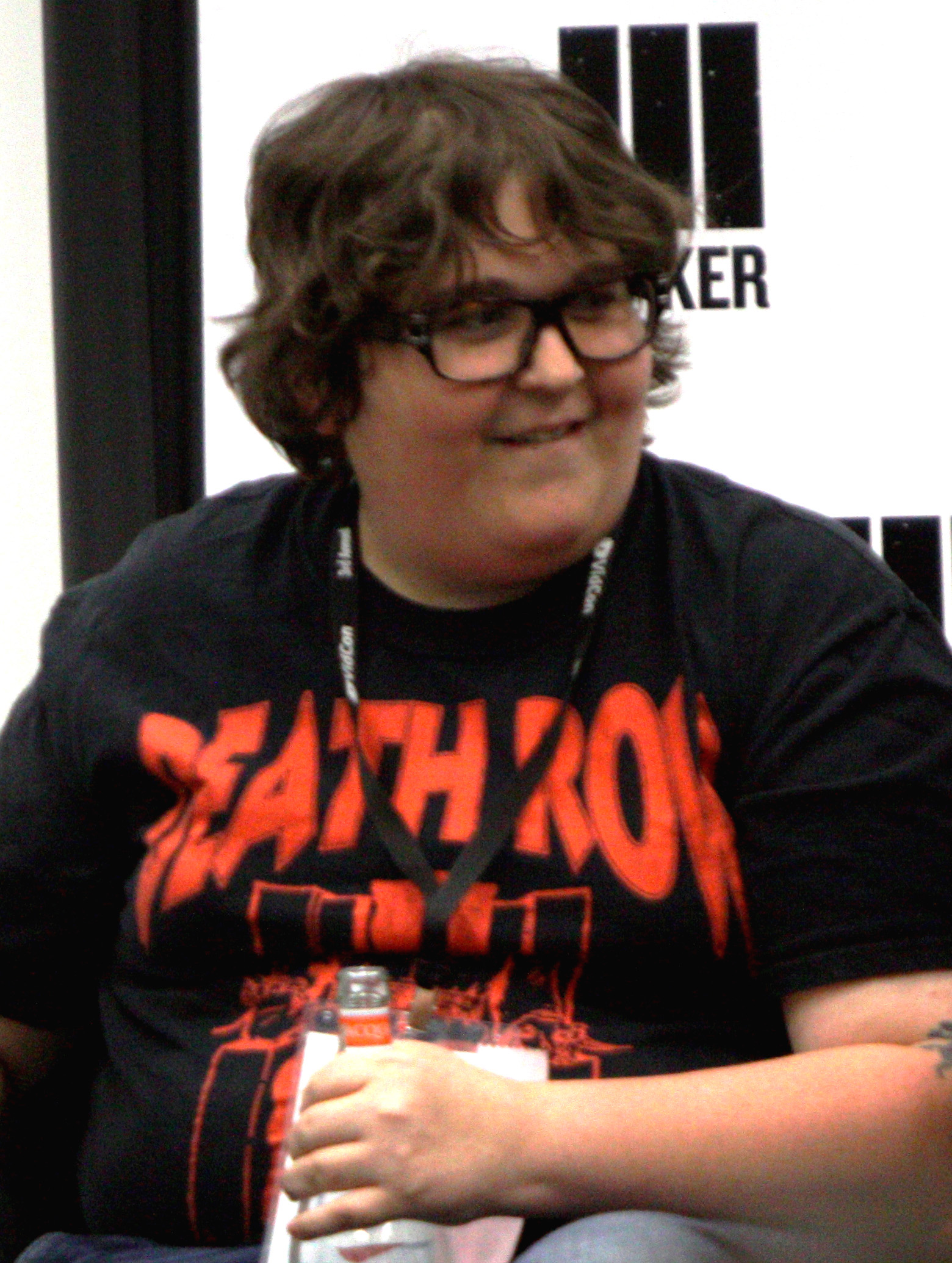
The episode also marks the return of Andy Milonakis as N.E.P.T.R.

"BMO Noire" was written and storyboarded by Tom Herpich and Skyler Page, from a story developed by series creator Pendleton Ward, Patrick McHale, and Kent Osborne. The beginning and ending of the episode feature Finn and Jake going on a strange and unexplored adventure (at least within the context of this episode). However, the fifth season episode "Princess Potluck" explains where Finn and Jake went. When "BMO Noire" was being storyboarded, Herpich and Page knew that Finn and Jake's adventure would later be explored, but they were assured by Osborne to not worry about it.

In an interview with Gumship, Yang revealed that she was under pressure when recording the episode. Due to her relative inexperience as a voice actress, she was so stressed that she did not sleep the night before the lines were recorded. Nate Cash, one of the series' creative directors, later noted that Yang "dug deep" and succeeded in providing believable voices for many different characters. The episode also marks the return of Andy Milonakis as N.E.P.T.R.

When BMO gets knocked out, it has a brief and surreal dream. One image features BMO with a human face. Herpich explained in the DVD commentary for the episode that the entire dream sequence was built off of BMO's desire to be a human—first expressed in the earlier fourth season "Five Short Graybles". In addition to the usual series background designers (Ghostshrimp, Santino Lascano, and Derek Hunter), Pete Herpich—Tom Herpich's brother—designed some of the backgrounds in this episode as part of a freelance job. "BMO Noire" was also his television debut as an artist. Jon Vermilyea also designed several backgrounds for this episode.

== Reception ==
“BMO Noire” first aired on Cartoon Network on August 6, 2012. According to Nielsen ratings, the episode ranked as the number one telecast of the day among all boy demographics aged 2–11 and 6–11. "BMO Noire" also ranked first in its timeslot among children groups aged 2–11 and 6–11, plus all boy demographics. The episode first saw physical release as part of the 2013 DVD, Jake the Dad, which included 16 episodes from the series' fourth and fifth seasons. It was later re-released as part of the complete fourth season DVD in October 2014.

Oliver Sava of The A.V. Club awarded the episode an "A−", applauding the installment's focus on BMO, a character often featured in only a supporting role. Sava compared the episode to the previous fourth season entry "Five Short Graybles", noting that both focused on BMO's loneliness and its penchant for inventing or imagining narratives to keep it company. Sava also complimented Yang's voice acting, writing: "Niki Yang is a superstar this episode, providing the voices for BMO et al, and the character’s stilted speech pattern turns stylized dialogue like 'Me and Lorraine are… dinosaur bones' into a hilarious punchline."
