= Card Wars =

- Adventure Time episode
- Episode no.: Season 4 Episode 14
- Directed by: Larry Leichliter (Note: Director); Adam Muto (Note: Creative director); Nick Jennings (Note: Art director)
- Written by: Somvilay Xayaphone; Bert Youn
- Story by: Patrick McHale; Kent Osborne; Pendleton Ward
- Production code: 1008-092
- Original air date: July 16, 2012
- Running time: 11 minutes

Episode chronology
← Previous "Princess Cookie"	Next → "Sons of Mars"
- Adventure Time season 4

"Card Wars" is the fourteenth episode of the fourth season of the American animated television series Adventure Time. The episode was written and storyboarded by Somvilay Xayaphone and Bert Youn, from a story by Patrick McHale, Kent Osborne, and Pendleton Ward. It originally aired on Cartoon Network on July 16, 2012.

The series follows the adventures of Finn (voiced by Jeremy Shada), a human boy, and his best friend and adoptive brother Jake (voiced by John DiMaggio), a dog with magical powers to change shape and grow and shrink at will. In this episode, Finn and Jake play Card Wars, a tabletop game. But things take a turn for the worse when Jake becomes overly competitive.

It had originally been planned to produce the episode during the first season because McHale and Ward were actively playing immersive, worldbuilding games. The episode received largely positive critical reviews, with Alasdair Wilkins of The A.V. Club applauding how the eponymous game lampooned Magic: The Gathering, Dungeons & Dragons, and Risk. Due to the episode's success, a mobile app and a physical version of the eponymous game have been released.

== Plot ==
Jake explains to Finn that his girlfriend, Lady Rainicorn will not play his favorite card game, ‘’Card Wars’’; Finn, however, agrees to play with Jake, and the duo agree that the winner (who will be crowned "the Cool Guy") will be rewarded with soda, whereas the loser (who will be dubbed "the Dweeb") will be forced to drink a terrible concoction including soda, coffee grounds, and kimchi, among other things. With the stakes set, the game begins.

Jake explains the complex and arcane rules to Finn, who quickly falls asleep. However, once the board game component begins, Finn gains the upper hand, largely by “flooping” (or “activating”) his Pig card. Time and time again, Jake tries to kill Finn's Pig, only for his plans to backfire. Soon, however, Jake becomes angry and aggressive, and Finn is warned by BMO (voiced by Niki Yang) that if Jake loses, he will become bitter and depressed. Finn, therefore, decides to purposely lose the game for Jake's sake.

Once the game resumes, Finn purposely sacrifices his all-powerful Pig, allowing Jake to defeat him. Finn is forced to drink the disgusting liquid concoction, but manages to trick Jake into trying it. The episode ends with the two brothers happily sharing the nasty drink, seemingly on friendly terms again.

== Production ==
"Card Wars" was written and storyboarded by Bert Youn and Somvilay Xayaphone, from a story developed by series creator Pendleton Ward, Patrick McHale, and Kent Osborne. The episode was directed by Larry Leichliter. During the middle of the episode, both Finn and Jake are depicted with grotesque, off-model faces, a trademark of Youn's storyboarding style. These faces necessitated lead character designer Andy Ristaino to drew several unique, key frames, colloquially known as "Bert Youn Specials". Ristaino revealed that he drew at least three of these faces for the episode. Ward later noted, in the DVD commentary for the third season episode "Another Way", that "Card Wars" featured Youn's most extreme and exaggerated faces.

Storyboard artist Rebecca Sugar noted that the idea behind this episode had been in development for a long time. Originally, it had been planned to make the episode during the first season because McHale and Ward were actively playing immersive, worldbuilding games. However, it took until the fourth season for the episode to be made. Nate Cash served as the episode's creative director. He messaged both Youn—who, at the time, was in South Korea—and Ward via Facebook to inform the two that he enjoyed the episode so much. Many of the scenes with BMO were inspired by Erik Fountain and Cash's experiences skateboarding. Cash in particular posed out all of the moves to make them faithful to real life.

== Reception ==
"Card Wars" first aired on Cartoon Network on July 16, 2012. On the night it aired, it ranked as the number one telecast of the day in the Nielsen ratings among boys aged 2–11. It also ranked first in its timeslot among children ages 2–11. The episode first saw physical release as part of the 2013 Fionna and Cake DVD, which included 16 episodes from the series' second, third, and fourth seasons. It was later re-released as part of the complete fourth season DVD in October 2014.

Alasdair Wilkins of The A.V. Club awarded the episode an "A−" and wrote that, on the surface, the episode "has got to be an instant contender for the most low-key Adventure Time ever", noting that there are no guest stars and that the action is centered entirely in Finn and Jake's Tree Fort. However, he applauded the episode, arguing that it "absolutely nails the insanity of trying to jump into an overcomplicated, impenetrable game with a much more seasoned competitor". Wilkins compared the titular Card Wars game to Magic: The Gathering, Dungeons & Dragons, and Risk, pointing out that Card Wars' "byzantine rules and gleefully baffling terminology" emulates and lampoons the aforementioned games. Ultimately, Wilkins concluded that the episode was successful because of "how real this all feels".

Tyler Foster of DVD Talk named the episode as one of the "highlights" of the Fionna and Cake DVD, writing, "As the show often feels like a big riff on Dungeons and Dragons, this spoof of tabletop gaming is full of absurd yet deeply familiar moments: the endless rule-reading, the surprise triumphs, and the seething rage."

The episode was later nominated for and won a Golden Reel Award for Best Sound Editing: Sound Effects, Foley, Dialogue and ADR Animation in Television.

== Merchandise ==
The popularity of the episode has led Cartoon Network to market several versions of the game.

=== Mobile app ===
On February 16, 2014, a mobile app version of the game developed by Kung Fu Factory was released that expanded the original premise of the show to create additional storylines, characters, creatures and environments while further developing the gameplay rules. The app itself dismayed critics due to its in-app purchases, however, proved popular on the app store rising to #1 in the top paid apps, with review aggregation site Metacritic awarding the game a 73, denoting "mixed or average reviews". On June 18, 2015, an expansion was released for the iOS app that featured Fionna and Cake along with new gameplay features.

=== Physical version ===
A physical version of the game was released on February 19, 2014 by Cryptozoic Entertainment. This version, made for two players, features 80 different cards, 8 lane tiles, and 20 hit point tokens. Several variants have been released, including a "Finn vs. Jake" box, a "BMO vs. Lady Rainicorn" release, and a "Lumpy Space Princess vs. Princess Bubblegum" set. On November 15, 2023, to celebrate the 10th anniversary of the card game's release, Cryptozoic launched a Kickstarter campaign to fund its re-release. This "Ultimate Collection" would include all previously released variants of the game alongside several add-ons, such as a play mat and a storage box.

=== Comic ===
A 6-issue comic series by Kaboom! is planned, with full subscriptions being sold in advance.

1. issue 1 released July 2015 with 3 alternate covers by John Kovalic, for San Diego Comic-Con and 10-year anniversary commemoration
2. issue 2 having released August 2015 with 1 cover by Jen Wang
