= I Remember You (Adventure Time) =

- Adventure Time episode
- Episode no.: Season 4 Episode 25
- Directed by: Larry Leichliter (Note: Director); Adam Muto (Note: Creative director); Nick Jennings (Note: Art director)
- Written by: Cole Sanchez; Rebecca Sugar
- Story by: Patrick McHale; Kent Osborne; Pendleton Ward
- Production code: 1008-103
- Original air date: October 15, 2012
- Running time: 11 minutes

Episode chronology
← Previous "Reign of Gunters"	Next → "The Lich"
- Adventure Time season 4

"I Remember You" is the twenty-fifth and penultimate episode of the fourth season of the American animated television series Adventure Time. The episode was written and storyboarded by Cole Sanchez and Rebecca Sugar, from a story by Patrick McHale, Kent Osborne, and Pendleton Ward. It originally aired on Cartoon Network on October 15, 2012. The episode later re-aired on March 25, 2013, together with the fifth season episode "Simon & Marcy", and as such was advertised as a half-hour special.

The series follows the adventures of Finn (voiced by Jeremy Shada), a human boy, and his best friend and adoptive brother Jake (voiced by John DiMaggio), a dog with magical powers to change shape and grow and shrink at will. In this episode, Marceline the Vampire Queen (voiced by Olivia Olson) collaborates with the Ice King (voiced by Tom Kenny) to write a song, and Marceline tries to get the Ice King to remember who he really is. This episode reveals that Marceline and the Ice King previously knew each other from the aftermath of the Mushroom War, a cataclysmic event that occurred a thousand years before the beginning of the series.

Formerly titled "Help", "I Remember You" helped expand upon and explore the Ice King's previous life. The episode features four songs—"The Fry Song", "Oh Bubblegum", "Nuts", and "Remember You"—all of which were written by Sugar, although Sanchez co-wrote the lyrics on "Oh Bubblegum." Sugar used an omnichord for the demo of the eponymous song, and their playing ended up as part of the episode. "I Remember You" was watched by 2.535 million people and received universal acclaim, with many critics praising the story's depth and its exploration of mental disorders, memory, and loss.

== Plot ==
External videos
- FULL EPISODE: I Remember You | Adventure Time | Cartoon Network — Official upload of the episode onto YouTube

=== Background ===
In the context of the series, Marceline the Vampire Queen is a thousand-year-old vampire. The Ice King is a recurring antagonist of the series, and frequently steals princesses throughout Ooo; although he is often at odds with Finn and Jake, he is generally not a serious threat. He was formerly a human archaeologist named Simon Petrikov who discovered a magic crown that gives him magical ice powers but eroded his memory and made him go insane. In addition, throughout the series, various characters and events hint at the mysterious Mushroom War, a cataclysmic war that destroyed modern human society.

=== Events ===
The Ice King decides that he wants to enlist Marceline's help in writing a song to woo princesses, taking pages randomly torn from an old scrapbook with him for later inspiration. He flies to her cave, and after a minor scuffle that involves Finn and Jake, Marceline finally relents and helps him write a song. At first, the Ice King simply sings a song he wrote about Princess Bubblegum, before breaking down, crying about his loneliness and damaging Marceline's living room with his ice magic. Marceline tells him to "stop acting crazy", and he pushes her, before timidly retreating to the top of her refrigerator. Marceline begins to lament, via the song "Nuts", and notes that, despite his instability, she is glad to see him. The Ice King is surprised to find out that she "likes" him and asks for a hug. However, when he misinterprets her feelings and tries to kiss her, Marceline angrily confronts him and asks if he remembers his past by calling him by his actual name: Simon.

The Ice King is oblivious to his former self, and Marceline begins looking through the Ice King's scrapbook pages to show him evidence of his former life. Among the pages is a picture of a young Marceline, with a message to her from a thousand years ago scrawled on the back. The message, written by Simon before his mind was completely consumed by the magic of the crown, asks Marceline to forgive him for whatever he does under the crown's influence. The Ice King fails to understand the context, and believes that he has written not a note of apology but lyrics, and attempts to add music to his "song". Overcome by emotion, Marceline cries and begins singing along while the Ice King obliviously plays drums. As they sing, a flabbergasted Finn and Jake watch the pair from outside Marceline's house, not knowing what exactly is going on.

While the eponymous song "Remember You" is being sung, the episode flashes back almost a thousand years before the events of the episode. A young Marceline is seen crying in the wreckage of a city, presumably after the Mushroom War. Simon sees her from a distance and runs over. In an attempt to comfort her, he gives her Hambo, a teddy bear, that he finds in the ruins of a toy store. Marceline takes the stuffed animal, stops crying, and looks up in happiness.

== Production ==
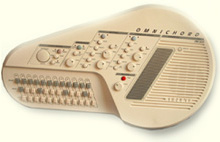
Storyboard artist Rebecca Sugar used an omnichord for the eponymous song "Remember You".

"I Remember You" was storyboarded by Cole Sanchez and Rebecca Sugar, from a story by Patrick McHale, Kent Osborne, and Pendleton Ward. The episode was directed by Larry Leichliter, with Adam Muto serving as creative director and Nick Jennings serving as art director. The original working title for the episode was "Help". Former storyboard artist and creative director for the series Adam Muto joked that the change was made due to the famous Beatles song of the same name.

The idea to create an episode based on a shared history between Marceline the Vampire Queen and the Ice King was Ward's idea. Sugar had also been pushing for a Marceline and Ice King musical episode. Sugar was responsible for designing Marceline's look in the episode. According to her, the shirt that Marceline wears was "loosely based off [sic] a stretched out old D.A.R.E. shirt."

The episode features three new songs: "Oh Bubblegum", "Nuts", and the titular "Remember You". Sugar composed the music for all four, and wrote the lyrics (Sanchez co-wrote the lyrics for "Oh Bubblegum"). Sugar recorded demos for the songs and Rob Sugar, Rebecca's father, released the three new demos on his official YouTube account. For the demo for "I Remember You", Sugar recorded vocals over a separate track of her playing an omnichord; Sugar's omnichord playing was eventually worked directly into the episode. While Sugar was pitching the song, she played her songs but her omnichord started to lose power. Sugar and the crew realized that the sound of the omnichord losing power fit with the mood of the episode. According to Rob, the "off-key notes were accidents of running out of power—it took a lot of tries to make it happen on cue." For the eponymous song, Sugar wrote on her personal Tumblr that it "was so amazing to work with Olivia Olson and Tom Kenny on the songs for this episode, they had so much chemistry in the booth together!" She wrote that she constructed the episode to "do them justice." Olson noted that, despite the sad themes featured in the installment, recording the dialogue with Kenny and music for the episode was a fun experience. While the two were recording, Olson had to sing Kenny his melodies; Kenny would then parrot the lines back in the voice of the Ice King.

In addition to the three new songs, the episode also features a modified version of "The Fry Song", which had originally appeared in the second season episode "It Came from the Nightosphere". During the recording of the aforementioned episode, Tom Kenny recorded his own version of the "Fry Song" for fun, which was later included in the third season episode "Holly Jolly Secrets". This version later inspired Ice King's alternate "Gunter" version in "I Remember You".

== Reception ==
"I Remember You" aired on October 15, 2012. It was viewed by 2.535 million people, and received a 0.5 rating in the 18–49 demographic. This means that it was seen by 0.5 percent of all 18- to 49-year-olds at the time of the broadcast. The episode later re-aired on March 25, 2013, together with the fifth season episode "Simon & Marcy", and was advertised by Cartoon Network as a "half hour special." This special was watched by 2.6 million viewers.

The episode received glowing critical acclaim. Charlie Jane Anders of io9 called the episode "one of the most intense things I've seen in ages." She specifically cited the final flashback as noteworthy, noting that "The final scene, where Marceline and Ice King have this weird duet, made me lose my shit and keeps popping into my head. It's rare that any television show gets its hooks into your brain like that, but especially a kid's cartoon." She concluded that the main reason that the ending was so powerful was that it showed the viewers the "immediate aftermath of the Mushroom War" and allowed the viewers to see "the way Marceline's personal loss mirrors the wider loss of the end of the entire world" following the war.

Oliver Sava of The A.V. Club wrote that "never has an Adventure Time episode triggered waterworks like 'I Remember You'." He called it "one of the most touching stories this series has ever told", and praised the way it took Marceline and the Ice King—whom he called two of the show's most tragic characters—and put "them together in a way that hits like a sledgehammer." He felt that the episode also served as a way to tell "a heartbreaking story about how mental illness can tear people apart", noting that the Ice King's condition is similar to how people with bipolar disorder behave. Eric Kohn of IndieWire, in an article explaining why "Adventure Time is the best sci-fi show on TV right now" following the airing of "Simon & Marcy", wrote that "I Remember You" was "the finest entry in the series' history." He further complimented the titular song, describing it as "heartbreaking" and "show-stopping."

Steven Aoun of PopMatters applauded the way the episode "focuses on two popular supporting characters, and foregrounds the relation between memory and identity." Furthermore, the site noted that "the sound that takes you by surprise may be your own crying." Novelist Lev Grossman, in an interview with NPR, praised the backstory of the Ice King and the exploration of his condition, noting that his origin is "psychologically plausible." Grossman praised the way the series was able to tackle the issues of mental illness, saying: "It's very affecting. My dad has been going through having Alzheimer's, and he's forgotten so much about who he used to be. And I look at him and think this cartoon is about my father dying."

== Media release ==
The episode first saw physical release as part of the 2013 Jake the Dad DVD, which included 16 episodes from the series' fourth and fifth seasons. It was later re-released as part of the complete fourth season DVD in October 2014. In addition, the 2015 limited edition 12" vinyl record release Marceline the Vampire Queen – Rock the Nightosphere included both "Nuts" and "I Remember You" alongside other songs sung by Marceline.
