= Sons of Mars (Adventure Time) =

- Adventure Time episode
- Episode no.: Season 4 Episode 15
- Directed by: Larry Leichliter (Note: Director); Nate Cash (Note: Creative director); Nick Jennings (Note: Art director)
- Written by: Ako Castuera; Jesse Moynihan
- Story by: Patrick McHale; Kent Osborne; Pendleton Ward; Jesse Moynihan; Doug TenNapel
- Production code: 1009-093
- Original air date: July 23, 2012
- Running time: 11 minutes

Guest appearances
- Tom Gammill as Glob; Melissa Villaseñor as Grob; Miguel Ferrer as Death, Grod

Episode chronology
← Previous "Card Wars"	Next → "Burning Low"
- Adventure Time season 4

"Sons of Mars" is the fifteenth episode of the fourth season of the American animated television series Adventure Time. The episode was written and storyboarded by Ako Castuera and Jesse Moynihan, from a story by Patrick McHale, Kent Osborne, and Pendleton Ward. It originally aired on Cartoon Network on July 23, 2012. The episode guest stars Tom Gammill, Miguel Ferrer, and Melissa Villaseñor.

The series follows the adventures of Finn (voiced by Jeremy Shada), a human boy, and his best friend and adoptive brother Jake (voiced by John DiMaggio), a dog with magical powers to change shape and grow and shrink at will. In this episode, when the Martian deity Grob Gob Glob Grod (voiced by Tom Gammill, Miguel Ferrer, Melissa Villaseñor, and Tom Kenny) comes to arrest Magic Man (voiced by Kenny) for his crimes, he uses his magic to disguise himself as Jake to escape his trial while having the real Jake take his place. Jake is tried by Abraham Lincoln (voiced by Ward), King of Mars, but soon, all is righted when Finn travels to Mars to save his friend.

The episode marks both the return of Lincoln, who had appeared in the series' pilot episode, as well as the on-screen debut of the oft-mentioned deity Grob Gob Glob Grod. Ward had originally wanted Bill Nye, Bill Cosby, Bill Clinton, and Bill Murray to voice the character. "Sons of Mars" helped Cartoon Network mark double digit growth in all kid demos for the night, according to Nielsen ratings. It received largely positive reviews from critics, with many applauding the absurdity apparent in the episode.

== Plot ==
Magic Man (voiced by Tom Kenny) is spotted by his four-headed Martian brother Grob Gob Glob Grod (voiced by Tom Gammill, Miguel Ferrer, Melissa Villaseñor, and Tom Kenny), who plans to arrest Magic Man and bring him back to Mars to face trial for his many crimes. Magic Man soon runs into Finn and Jake, and knocks them both unconscious. He then transforms himself into Jake, and transforms Jake into himself. Grob Gob Glob Grod, not realizing the difference, seizes the transformed Jake and flies back to Mars. Finn, aware of the situation, forces Magic Man to take him to Magic Man's house to find something that can help him save Jake. Magic Man's house, however, is completely derelict, and is a reflection of Magic Man's "sick mind". For instance, plants and animals live wildly in the structure, and a tiny Manticore is kept in a glass jar, apparently for Magic Man's amusement.

Finn discovers a Martian teleporter that was given to Magic Man in the hopes that he would learn love and voluntarily return to his home planet. Finn teleports to Mars, and witnesses Jake being put on trial in front of Abraham Lincoln (voiced by Pendleton Ward), the King of Mars. Magic Man is found guilty, and while Jake tries to plead his case, it falls on deaf ears. Lincoln gives Jake two options: he can either be put to death with the Wand of Disbursement, or Lincoln can use the power of the wand to turn him into living star dust. Before Jake can answer, Finn intervenes, accidentally causing the wand to touch Jake, killing him. Lincoln, realizing his mistake, travels to the 37th Dead World and pleads with Death; Lincoln initially offers Death an American penny in exchange for Jake's soul before agreeing to surrender his immortality. Death accepts the deal, bringing Jake back to life, but leaving Lincoln as a lifeless statue. Finn and Jake then take a rocket back to Earth and punch Magic Man in the face.

== Production ==
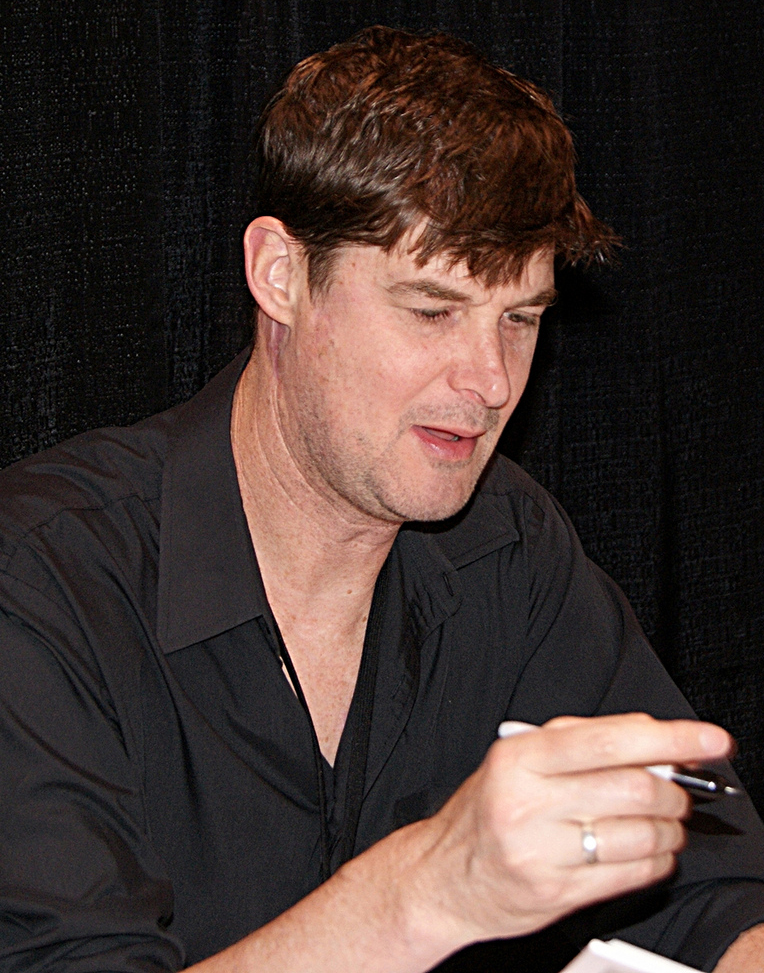
Elements of the episode were borrowed from a scrapped season one episode, storyboarded by Doug TenNapel.

"Sons of Mars" was written and storyboarded by Jesse Moynihan and Ako Castuera, from a story developed by series creator Pendleton Ward, Patrick McHale, Kent Osborne, Moynihan, and Doug TenNapel. TenNapel had previously written the storyboard for the scrapped first season episode "The Glorriors". The reason he was credited for "Sons of Mars" was because the scene featuring Lincoln interacting with Death was very similar to a scene he boarded in a scrapped season one episode. The entry was directed by Larry Leichliter. According to Moynihan, the episode was originally supposed to be connected to the third-season episode "Ghost Princess"; in Moynihan's original story, the premise involved both Ghost Princess and Magic Man. In the end, after "extensive meetings" with the show's writing staff, Moynihan decided to rewrite the episode so that it would serve as a sequel to Magic Man's story. The name "Margles" was a reference to Moynihan's ex-girlfriend Margaret. Moynihan envisioned the episode as a way to negate any negative energy about their relationship and breakup, thereby "exorcis[ing] [the energy] from his heart".

A large portion of the episode's original draft featured Finn and Jake discovering a strange naturalistic temple inscribed with carvings of Abraham Lincoln. These scenes were excised due to the time constraints of the episode, and creative director Nate Cash storyboarded a shorter scene—featuring Finn and Jake carrying a broken robot—to take the removed material's place. Ward was very conscientious in how Lincoln was portrayed in the episode; he wanted him to be exclusively referred to as "King of Mars". This was because he felt Lincoln's appearance in the pilot was solely for cheap laughs. For "Sons of Mars", Ward wanted his appearance to have real meaning.

Dan "Ghostshrimp" Bandit designed many of the backgrounds in this episode, including most of Magic Man's house; on his Instagram account, Ghostshrimp posted several background stills of this location, writing, "This is one of my all time fave locations for some reason! It just makes me feel silly and spooky at the same time!" Portions of Magic Man's house feature a number of cardboard boxes labelled "Dirt", which Ghostshrimp added because he thought they were "mysterious and intriguing". These sorts of idiosyncratic background details were added because Ghostshrimp was "try[ing] to create a story beyond the story!"

"Sons of Mars" features the return of several characters, with perhaps the most obvious being Magic Man, voiced by Kenny, who had originally appeared in the first-season episode "Freak City". The episode also features the return appearance of Lincoln as the king of Mars. Lincoln had originally appeared in the series' pilot episode in 2007. Grob Gob Glob Grod, an oft-mentioned deity in the Adventure Time universe appears on screen for the first time in this episode; Moynihan had crafted the character in order to retcon why various names had been ascribed to the being over the course of several seasons. The deity's four heads were voiced by Kenny, Tom Gammill, Melissa Villaseñor, and Miguel Ferrer. (Ward had originally wanted Bill Nye, Bill Cosby, Bill Clinton, and Bill Murray to voice the character.) Ferrer also reprises his role as Death, a character who had first appeared in the second season episode "Death in Bloom".

== Reception ==
"Sons of Mars" officially aired on July 23, 2012 on Cartoon Network. As part of Cartoon Network's Monday night line up, "Sons of Mars" helped the network show double digit growth in all kid demos for the night, according to Nielsen ratings. The episode first saw physical release as part of the 2013 Jake the Dad DVD, which included 16 episodes from the series' fourth and fifth seasons. It was later re-released as part of the complete fourth season DVD in October 2014.

Oliver Sava of The A.V. Club awarded the episode an "A" and described it as a "big mythology episode" for the series. He called it "a story for long-time fans of Adventure Time" due to its reveal of several important characters like Lincoln and Grob Gob Glob Grod. Sava felt that the episode was "random" and "incredibly bizarre", but that it gave both a better look at Adventure Time's "big picture" as well as the series' "psychedelic panorama of absurdity". Sava specifically applauded the episode's merging of bizarre characters and mundane tasks, such as Grod drawing on an overhead projector, as well as the non sequitur ending featuring the tiny manticore. Gordon Miller of Cinema Sentries called the episode one of the "standouts" of the Jake the Dad DVD, specifically praising the episode's use of Lincoln. Colin O'Boyle of GeekSmash enjoyed the appearance of both Lincoln and the tiny manticore, writing, "That, ladies and gents, is one of the reasons I love Adventure Time".
