= The Hard Easy (Adventure Time) =

- Adventure Time episode
- Episode no.: Season 4 Episode 23
- Directed by: Larry Leichliter (Note: Director); Nate Cash (Note: Creative director); Nick Jennings (Note: Art director)
- Written by: Tom Herpich; Skyler Page
- Story by: Patrick McHale; Kent Osborne; Pendleton Ward
- Production code: 1008-100
- Original air date: October 1, 2012
- Running time: 11 minutes

Guest appearances
- Brian Doyle-Murray as Prince Huge; Jonathan Katz as Mudscamp Elder

Episode chronology
← Previous "Ignition Point"	Next → "Reign of Gunters"
- Adventure Time season 4

"The Hard Easy" is the twenty-third episode of the fourth season of the American animated television series Adventure Time. The episode was written and storyboarded by Tom Herpich and Skyler Page, from a story by Patrick McHale, Kent Osborne, and Pendleton Ward. It originally aired on Cartoon Network on October 1, 2012. The episode guest stars Brian Doyle-Murray as Prince Huge and Jonathan Katz as the Mudscamp elder.

The series follows the adventures of Finn (voiced by Jeremy Shada), a human boy, and his best friend and adoptive brother Jake (voiced by John DiMaggio), a dog with magical powers to change shape and grow and shrink at will. In this episode, a group of Mudscamps asks Finn and Jake to protect them from the Mega Frog, their predator. Finn eventually learns that the Mega Frog is actually a cursed prince, and only a kiss can break the spell.

Katz originally was supposed to have appeared in the third season episode "The New Frontier", but scheduling conflicts resulted in him being unable to voice a character for the show until this episode. "The Hard Easy", which was advertised as the 100th episode of the series, was viewed by 2.643 million viewers, and received largely positive reviews from television critics.

== Plot ==
During a rainy day, Finn and Jake are approached by a mudscamp named Woobeewoo (voiced by Kent Osborne), who pleads with the heroes to help save his village. Agreeing to help, Finn and Jake appear before the village elder (voiced by Jonathan Katz) who reveals that their community is under attack by a giant Mega Frog that apparently tries to eat them. Finn and Jake agree to find the beast and stop it, and they set off.

While in the forest, Finn and Jake think they see the Mega Frog, but it turns out to be a wooden effigy. However, behind them, the Mega Frog appears, and he attempts to eat them. Finn and Jake flee into a cave, but the frog gives chase. Then and there, Finn realizes that the frog is not trying to eat them, but rather kiss them; Finn summons up his courage and leaps towards the frog, giving him a kiss that turns the monster into Prince Huge (voiced by Brian Doyle-Murray). The prince thanks the two, noting that he had been cursed for some time, even though he had tried to break his own curse.

== Production ==
"The Hard Easy" was written and storyboarded by Tom Herpich and Skyler Page, from a story developed by series creator Pendleton Ward, Patrick McHale, and Kent Osborne. The opening of the episode, featuring Finn and Jake looking for a source of water to swim in, was based on Herpich's experience trying to find swimming holes in North Carolina. The episode guest stars Brian Doyle-Murray appears as Prince Huge and Jonathan Katz as Mudscamp Elder. Katz was originally supposed to have played the role of Banana Man in the third season episode "The New Frontier", but he was unavailable at the time of recording; musical comedian "Weird Al" Yankovic subsequently filled the role. One of Katz's lines was actually a modification of one of Herpich's jokes. Ward was so pleased with the addition that he kept it in the final cut of the episode.

== Reception ==
"The Hard Easy" first aired on Cartoon Network on October 1, 2012. The episode was widely advertised as the 100th episode of the series. While it was the 100th episode produced, it was the 101st to air. The episode was seen by 2.643 million viewers, and received a 0.6 rating in the 18–49 demographic. This means it was seen by 0.6 percent of all 18- to 49-year-olds watching television at the time of the episode's airing. The episode first saw physical release as part of the 2013 DVD, Jake the Dad, which included 16 episodes from the series' fourth and fifth seasons. It was later re-released as part of the complete fourth season DVD in October 2014.

Oliver Sava of The A.V. Club awarded the episode an "A−", writing that it "shows exactly why this show has become so successful with variations on that central idea." He felt that while the episode was not "too crazy for the milestone story" the "simple yet striking character designs, stylized dialogue, intense action, clever comedy, and generally chill atmosphere combine to create a delightful burst of animated whimsy, light and frothy but still substantial." Sava argued that the episode took elements from the fairy tales Hansel and Gretel and The Frog Prince, but managed to tweak and change them "through this show's psychedelic toilet filter". Sava was particularly pleased with the Prince's transformation near the end of the episode, describing it thus: "The animation is breathtaking as the frog skin melts away to reveal a human skeleton, which grows nerves and muscles and skin and clothes that form a jolly prince, who has been trying to break his curse for ages."
