= The Lich =

- Adventure Time episode
- The Lich (pictured) possessing his arch-nemesis, Billy. The twist was called "horrifying" by Oliver Sava of The A.V. Club.
- Episode no.: Season 4 Episode 26
- Directed by: Larry Leichliter (Note: Director); Nate Cash (Note: Creative director); Nick Jennings (Note: Art director)
- Written by: Tom Herpich; Skyler Page
- Story by: Patrick McHale; Kent Osborne; Pendleton Ward
- Production code: 1008-104
- Original air date: October 22, 2012
- Running time: 11 minutes

Guest appearances
- Lou Ferrigno as Billy; Ron Perlman as The Lich; Ming-Na Wen as Farmworld Finn's mother

Episode chronology
← Previous "I Remember You"	Next → "Finn the Human"
- Adventure Time season 4

"The Lich" is the twenty-sixth episode and season finale of the fourth season of the American animated television series Adventure Time. The episode was written and storyboarded by Tom Herpich and Skyler Page, from a story by Patrick McHale, Kent Osborne, Pendleton Ward. It originally aired on Cartoon Network on October 22, 2012. The episode guest starred Lou Ferrigno as Billy, and Ron Perlman as the Lich.

The series follows the adventures of Finn (voiced by Jeremy Shada), a human boy, and his best friend and adoptive brother Jake (voiced by John DiMaggio), a dog with magical powers to change shape and grow and shrink at will. In this episode, Finn has an ominous dream about the Lich, and sets off with Jake to warn Billy. Billy reveals that they must unite the gems of all the crowns of power, place them in the Enchiridion, and open a portal to the multiverse. However, it is revealed that the Lich is actually disguised as Billy. Finn and Jake then follow him through the multiverse.

"The Lich" would be the inception of a three-episode arc that would not be concluded until the second episode of the fifth season. In the opening scene, Herpich used unicorn symbolism, most notably the tapestry The Unicorn is in Captivity and No Longer Dead—a piece of the seven-part tapestry The Hunt of the Unicorn—to illustrate the themes of the episode. "The Lich" was watched by 2.589 million people and received largely positive critical attention, with many commenting on the episode's cliffhanger.

== Plot ==
The episode begins with Finn having a dream about the Lich-possessed snail using the Enchiridion to attack Billy. Finn awakes and he frantically tells Jake about his dream, who—after hearing that the Cosmic Owl appeared in the dream—believes it is a premonition. The two go visit Billy, and tell him about the dream. Billy realizes and explains the importance of the dream, and the three of them set out to stop the Lich. After they head out, Billy tells them that they need to collect all the magical gems from all the princesses and Ice King's power crystals that protect them from the Lich. With only one gem left, Finn finds the Enchiridion in Billy's knapsack. Billy reveals that the book has magical properties, and after activating it a certain way, the circle on the front opens up showing 9 slots where all the gems go in.

A holographic being named Booko appears and explains that when all the gems are placed in the slots in the book, a portal to the multiverse will be opened. Billy claims that he is going to throw the Lich through this portal. Finn and Jake then set off to get the last gem: Princess Bubblegum's. Finn and Jake try to take the gem, a scuffle ensues, and the duo manages to get the gem. Once outside, Finn puts the gem in the final slot. Lights start to flash out of the stones on the book, and then the book starts to shake while the pieces start to fall off as the Enchiridion turns into a black block. As Finn is running, Billy tells Finn to hurry. Princess Bubblegum then runs out telling Finn that Billy is really the Lich.

Just as she says this, one of the Gumball Guardians gets up, detecting the Lich, and blasts Billy revealing the Lich's skeletal form beneath Billy's skin. The Lich then asks for the book, but Finn smashes the book with his knee. However, his action accidentally opens up a wormhole. The Lich tries to pass through but Jake grabs him. Finn and Jake then try to stop him from going through, but are inevitably pulled through.

The scene then dramatically changes; Finn—in a completely different art style—is playing his flute with Jake, who appears to be a regular, non-talking dog. The two are sitting outside a small house with a barn next to it. His mother calls him in for what she says is "something important," and the episode ends with Finn assuming he has done something wrong and he and Jake quickly run inside. (Note: In the fifth season premiere "Finn the Human", it is revealed that this scene takes place in an alternate reality of Ooo called Farmworld. In this version of the main universe, the cataclysmic Mushroom War never occurred, the world has been cut off from magic, and the Lich had not yet come into existence.)

== Production ==
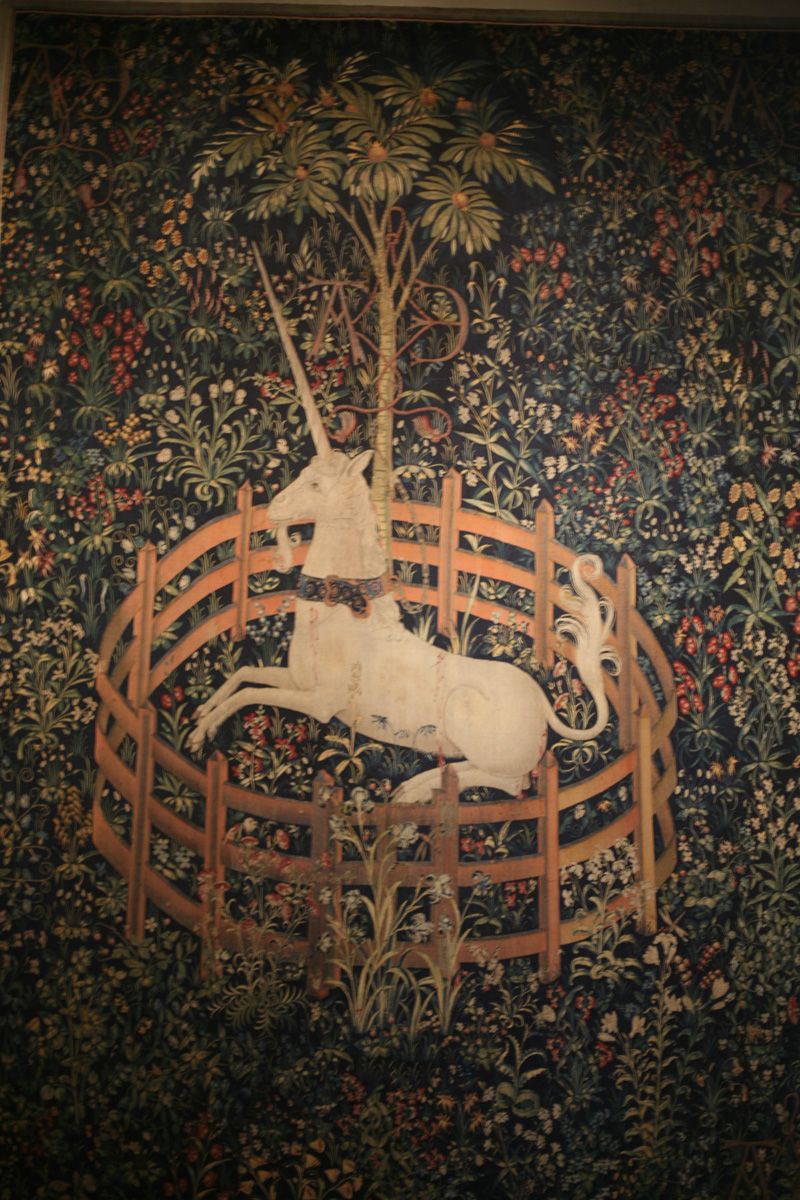
The episode makes use of the tapestry The Unicorn is in Captivity and No Longer Dead.

"The Lich" was written by Tom Herpich and Skyler Page, from a story by Patrick McHale, Kent Osborne, and Pendleton Ward. It was directed by Larry Leichliter. The episode guest stars Lou Ferrigno as the hero Billy, and Ron Perlman as the Lich. Ferrigno had previously voiced Billy in the first season episode "His Hero", and Perlman had previously voiced the Lich in the second season entry "Mortal Recoil".

In the opening scene, Herpich used unicorn symbolism, most notably the tapestry The Unicorn is in Captivity and No Longer Dead, a piece of the seven-part tapestry The Hunt of the Unicorn, to illustrate the themes of the episode. According to then-character designer Andy Ristaino, the decision was conscientious, but that "as for the meaning you're just going to have to think about unicorn symbology and how that relates to a specific character in the episode." Later, in the DVD commentary for the fourth season, Herpich revealed that the unicorn is representative of the Lich, because they both have one horn. The ending of the episode, featuring Farmworld Finn and a different animation style, had previously been foreshadowed in the earlier fourth-season episode "King Worm".

In the original storyboard for the episode, Billy was supposed to explain that he would push the Lich through the multiverse portal into the Crystal Citadel, a prison created so that no one can escape from it. Billy would further explain that the Citadel housed Finn's actual father. This rejected storyline would later be revisited at the end of the fifth season's final episode "Billy's Bucket List", as well as the season six premiere "Wake Up"/"Escape from the Citadel". In the end of the episode, the Lich was originally supposed to try to convince Finn to give him the Enchiridon by promising that he could both bring back his birth parents and give him immortality. According to Ward, information regarding Finn's father was cut because it conveyed too much information in a short amount of time. Had this plot point stayed in the episode, Finn's father would have been portrayed as a hero.

== Reception ==
"The Lich" first aired on Cartoon Network on October 22, 2012. The episode was watched by 2.589 million viewers, and scored a 0.5 percent in the 18–49 demographic Nielsen household rating; this means that it was seen by 0.5 percent of all 18- to 49-year-olds watching television at the time of the airing. The episode first saw physical release as part of the complete fourth season DVD in October 2014. It was later re-released as part of the 2014 Finn the Human DVD, which included 16 episodes from the series' third, fourth, fifth, and sixth seasons.

Oliver Sava of The A.V. Club was particularly pleased with the episode, and gave it an "A". He complimented the storyline, as well as the sequence featuring Finn and Jake stealing jewels, noting that it allowed "for increasingly bizarre visuals", such as Jake making a purse in his flesh to house the gems. Sava was particularly pleased with the ending, calling it "a doozy of a cliffhanger" as well as "the kind of ending that calls into question everything that we’ve seen before."
