= Princess Cookie =

- Adventure Time episode
- Episode no.: Season 4 Episode 13
- Directed by: Larry Leichliter (Note: Director); Nate Cash (Note: Creative director); Nick Jennings (Note: Art director)
- Written by: Tom Herpich; Skyler Page
- Story by: Patrick McHale; Kent Osborne; Pendleton Ward
- Production code: 1008-091
- Original air date: June 25, 2012
- Running time: 11 minutes

Guest appearance
- Donald Faison as Baby-Snaps

Episode chronology
← Previous "Gotcha!"	Next → "Card Wars"
- Adventure Time season 4

"Princess Cookie" is the thirteenth episode of the fourth season of the American animated television series Adventure Time. The episode was written and storyboarded by Tom Herpich and Skyler Page, from a story by Patrick McHale, Kent Osborne, and Pendleton Ward. It originally aired on Cartoon Network on June 18, 2012. The episode guest stars Donald Faison as Baby-Snaps.

The series follows the adventures of Finn (voiced by Jeremy Shada), a human boy, and his best friend and adoptive brother Jake (voiced by John DiMaggio), a dog with magical powers to change shape and grow and shrink at will. In this episode, Finn and Jake are sent in to rescue the hostages from a rogue cookie named Baby-Snaps. Things get complicated when Jake begins to sympathize with him; he learns that Baby-Snaps only wants to be a princess.

The episode received largely positive critical reviews, with a Oliver Sava of The A.V. Club calling it one of the fourth season's strongest episodes. The episode was later nominated for "Best Animated Television Production For Children" at the 2013 Annie Awards, although the episode did not win. It was also screened at the 2013 Annecy International Animated Film Festival.

== Plot ==
The episode begins in medias res, with Finn, Jake, and Princess Bubblegum at the scene of a hostage situation. The perpetrator, a chocolate chip cookie named Baby-Snaps (voiced by Donald Faison) and his henchman demands Bubblegum's crown in exchange for the prisoners. Jake, disguised as a milkman, and Finn, disguised as his shadow, successfully enter the building. Finn sneaks off to take care of Baby-Snaps's chocolate chip accomplices, while Jake tries to reason with the cookie.

Jake soon learns that Baby-Snaps grew up in an orphanage, and that his life changed when he first met Princess Bubblegum, due to the happiness she brought to the children. However, after a young Baby-Snaps told her that he too wanted to be a princess, she laughed at him. This in turn, caused him to resent her. Jake, sympathetic to Baby-Snaps's plight, helps him escape, although the two are pursued by the Banana Guards. Cornered on the precipice of a canyon, Baby-Snaps realizes the futility of his flight, thanks Jake, and jumps over the edge.

However, instead of dying, he is merely fragmented into several pieces. Baby-Snaps is later put back together and institutionalized. At the hospital, Finn and Jake arrive and, with the approval of Princess Bubblegum, Jake gives Baby-Snaps a grass crown so that he can be the princess of the Grasslands.

== Production ==
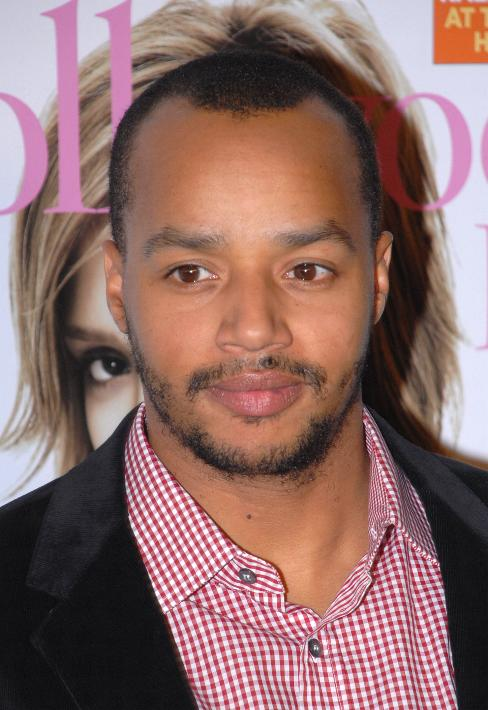
The episode guest stars Donald Faison, who voices Princess Cookie.

"Princess Cookie" was written and storyboarded by Tom Herpich and Skyler Page, from a story developed by series creator Pendleton Ward, Patrick McHale and Kent Osborne. Donald Faison guest stars in this episode, playing the part of Baby-Snaps. Faison later noted in an interview that his experience with Adventure Time was extremely positive; John DiMaggio came and read lines with him, which Faison called "really cool because usually when you do voiceover work it's just you in a box and a director and a writer and whoever else is in another room". He also revealed that he has received a large amount of positive feedback for his role and that he would love to reprise his character if given the chance. Likewise, the writing and production staff of Adventure Time were pleased with both Faison's performance and his amiability, with Herpich noting he was "so, so nice".

== Reception ==
"Princess Cookie" aired on Cartoon Network on June 25, 2012. The episode first saw physical release as part of the 2013 Fionna and Cake DVD, which included 16 episodes from the series' second, third, and fourth seasons. It was later re-released as part of the complete fourth season DVD in October 2014.

Oliver Sava of The A.V. Club awarded the episode a "A", calling it "one of the strongest episodes of this season". He was complimentary towards the story, writing that it "starts mid-adventure and never loses momentum." Sava praised the casting of Faison, writing that he "is absolutely fantastic in this episode, delivering his absurd lines with a passion that helps sell the drama of the scenario." Sava also felt that the final scene was both optimistic and beautiful, and he concluded that the "contrast between a bleak situation and literally candy-covered everything else is what Adventure Time is founded on, and 'Princess Cookies' [sic] embodies that idea masterfully."

The episode was later nominated for "Best Animated Television Production For Children" at the 2013 Annie Awards, although the episode did not win. It was also screened at the 2013 Annecy International Animated Film Festival.
