= You Made Me =

- Adventure Time episode
- Episode no.: Season 4 Episode 20
- Directed by: Larry Leichliter (Note: Director); Nate Cash (Note: Creative director); Nick Jennings (Note: Art director)
- Written by: Tom Herpich; Jesse Moynihan
- Story by: Patrick McHale; Kent Osborne; Pendleton Ward
- Production code: 1008-099
- Original air date: August 27, 2012
- Running time: 11 minutes

Guest appearance
- Justin Roiland as the Earl of Lemongrab

Episode chronology
← Previous "Lady & Peebles"	Next → "Who Would Win"
- Adventure Time season 4

"You Made Me" is the twentieth episode of the fourth season of the American animated television series Adventure Time. The episode was written and storyboarded by Tom Herpich and Jesse Moynihan, from a story by Patrick McHale, Kent Osborne, and Pendleton Ward. It originally aired on Cartoon Network on August 27, 2012. The episode guest stars Justin Roiland as the Earl of Lemongrab.

The series follows the adventures of Finn (voiced by Jeremy Shada), a human boy, and his best friend and adoptive brother Jake (voiced by John DiMaggio), a dog with magical powers to change shape and grow and shrink at will. In this episode, Princess Bubblegum (voiced by Hynden Walch) hands over the Pup Gang to Lemongrab after he upsets the Candy Kingdom and demands citizens for his isolated castle. However, Lemongrab is not satisfied with these unruly citizens. Bubblegum eventually makes him a twin to rule with.

The episode features the return of Roiland, who had first appeared in the third season episode, "Too Young". According to Nielsen ratings, the episode ranked as the number one telecast in its time period for all children demographics aged 2–11, 6–11, and 9–14, as well as in all boy demographics. Oliver Sava of The A.V. Club wrote positively of the episode, applauding its exploration of Lemongrab.

== Plot ==
After Princess Bubblegum (voiced by Hynden Walch) discovers that the Earl of Lemongrab (voiced by Justin Roiland) is watching her subjects while they sleep, she confronts the Earl, who complains that he has no one to govern. He then has a mental breakdown, accusing Bubblegum of being "his glob". Bubblegum sends the Pup Gang, a band of delinquent youth, to Lemongrab's castle, but their unruly attitude causes them to be electrocuted and consequently injured by the Earl. Lemongrab subsequently returns to watching the candy citizens as they sleep.

The Princess tries to show the Earl how to care for his citizens, but he has another breakdown and leaves. Princess Bubblegum, Finn, and Jake therefore decide journey to Castle Lemongrab to try to help the Earl and save the Pup Gang. Lemongrab soon presents himself, and tries to recondition Finn and Jake. Just when he is about to harm Bubblegum with a soundsword, a clone of Lemongrab, Lemongrab 2, walks into the room. Bubblegum explains that she made him to be the original Lemongrab's companion, so that he would not be so lonely. The two Earls become friends very quickly and send off the Pup Gang, Bubblegum, and Finn and Jake.

== Production ==
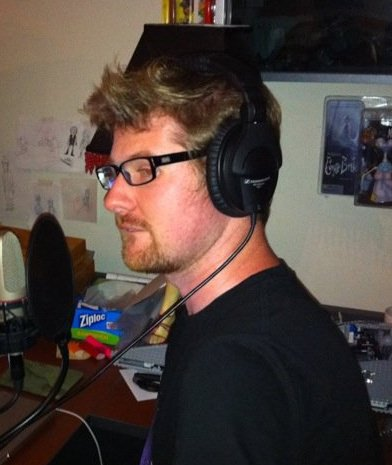
The episode features the return of Lemongrab, voiced by Justin Roiland.

"You Made Me" was written and storyboarded by Tom Herpich and Jesse Moynihan, from a story developed by series creator Pendleton Ward, Patrick McHale, and Kent Osborne. Steve Wolfhard, who would go on to be promoted to series storyboard artist during the show's fifth season, cleaned up most of Herpich's and Moynihan's storyboard drawings. Moynihan himself struggled when making the episode, because he was unsure if audiences would appreciate new dimensions that had been added to the character, or if they only wanted "to re-live the moments that made a character popular."

The episode features the return of Justin Roiland, who voices the Earl of Lemongrab. "You Made Me" also featured Lemongrab's catchphrase, "Unacceptable!" This was added into the episode by Moynihan; Herpich, on the other hand, has refused to place the line in his storyboards again for fear of overusing it. In one scene, Finn opens up several doors in Castle Lemongrab, only to find catcher's mitts. Herpich, who boarded these scenes, refused to explain their meaning, arguing on the DVD commentary for the fourth season that they speak for themselves.

== Reception ==
"You Made Me" first aired on Cartoon Network on August 27, 2012. According to Nielsen ratings, the episode ranked as the number one telecast in its time period for all children demographics aged 2–11, 6–11, and 9–14, as well as in all boy demographics. The episode first saw physical release as part of the 2013 Fionna and Cake DVD, which included 16 episodes from the series' second, third, and fourth seasons. It was later re-released as part of the complete fourth season DVD in October 2014.

Oliver Sava of The A.V. Club awarded the episode a "B", writing that the relationship between Princess Bubblegum and Lemongrab "has echoes of both religious and relationship crises, with PB serving as the unfair god as well as the ex-girlfriend who leaves her significant other in shambles."
