= Goliad (Adventure Time) =

- Adventure Time episode
- Episode no.: Season 4 Episode 10
- Directed by: Larry Leichliter (Note: Director); Nate Cash (Note: Creative director); Nick Jennings (Note: Art director)
- Written by: Tom Herpich; Skyler Page
- Story by: Tom Herpich; Patrick McHale; Kent Osborne; Pendleton Ward
- Production code: 1008-087
- Original air date: June 4, 2012
- Running time: 11 minutes

Guest appearances
- Wendy Linehan as Goliad; Henry Linehan as Stormo

Episode chronology
← Previous "Princess Monster Wife"	Next → "Beyond This Earthly Realm"
- Adventure Time season 4

"Goliad" is the tenth episode of the fourth season of the American animated television series Adventure Time. The episode was written and storyboarded by Tom Herpich and Skyler Page, from a story by Patrick McHale, Kent Osborne, and Pendleton Ward. It originally aired on Cartoon Network on June 4, 2012. The episode guest stars Graham Linehan's children, Wendy and Henry.

The series follows the adventures of Finn (voiced by Jeremy Shada), a human boy, and his best friend and adoptive brother Jake (voiced by John DiMaggio), a dog with magical powers to change shape and grow and shrink at will. In this episode, Princess Bubblegum (voiced by Hynden Walch) begins to fear for her mortality, and creates an eternal sphinx named Goliad to be her successor. Things go awry, however, when the sphinx turns against Bubblegum.

Linehan's children, Wendy and Henry, were brought on to voice Goliad and Stormo, respectively, after Ward saw video of them impersonating Adventure Time characters. The episode received largely positive critical reviews, and was later nominated for an Annie Award for "Storyboarding in an Animated Television/Broadcast Production" at the 2013 award ceremony, although the episode did not win.

== Plot ==
Princess Bubblegum summons Finn and Jake and explains that, due to her recent brush with death, she has become aware of her own mortality. Reasoning that she may not always be around for her subjects, she reveals that she has created a candy sphinx named Goliad, from her own DNA. Finn and Jake insist that Bubblegum let them teach it about the world and what it means to be a leader, and she lets them, exhausted from her work.

Finn and Jake take Goliad to a preschool, where the kids are unruly and destructive. After Jake gets angry and aggressively yells at them, Goliad begins to get the wrong impression of what it means to be a leader; she explains to Finn and Jake that, were she to control everyone, the world would be perfect. Goliad then reveals that her head conceals a third eye, which she uses to psychically control Finn as well as read people's minds. Once Bubblegum learns that Goliad has gone rogue, she rushes off to solve the problem, leaving Finn and Jake to momentarily hold off the corruptive and almost-omnipotent sphinx. Nearly bested, Finn and Jake are about to be beaten when Bubblegum returns with a new sphinx named Stormo, made from Finn's DNA. Goliad tries to convince Stormo to join forces with her, but the latter refuses. Stormo then sacrifices himself by engaging Goliad in a "psychic duel"; because the two are equally matched, this battle results in an eternal mental stalemate that keeps Goliad at bay. The episode ends with Finn wishing Stormo a happy birthday.

== Production ==
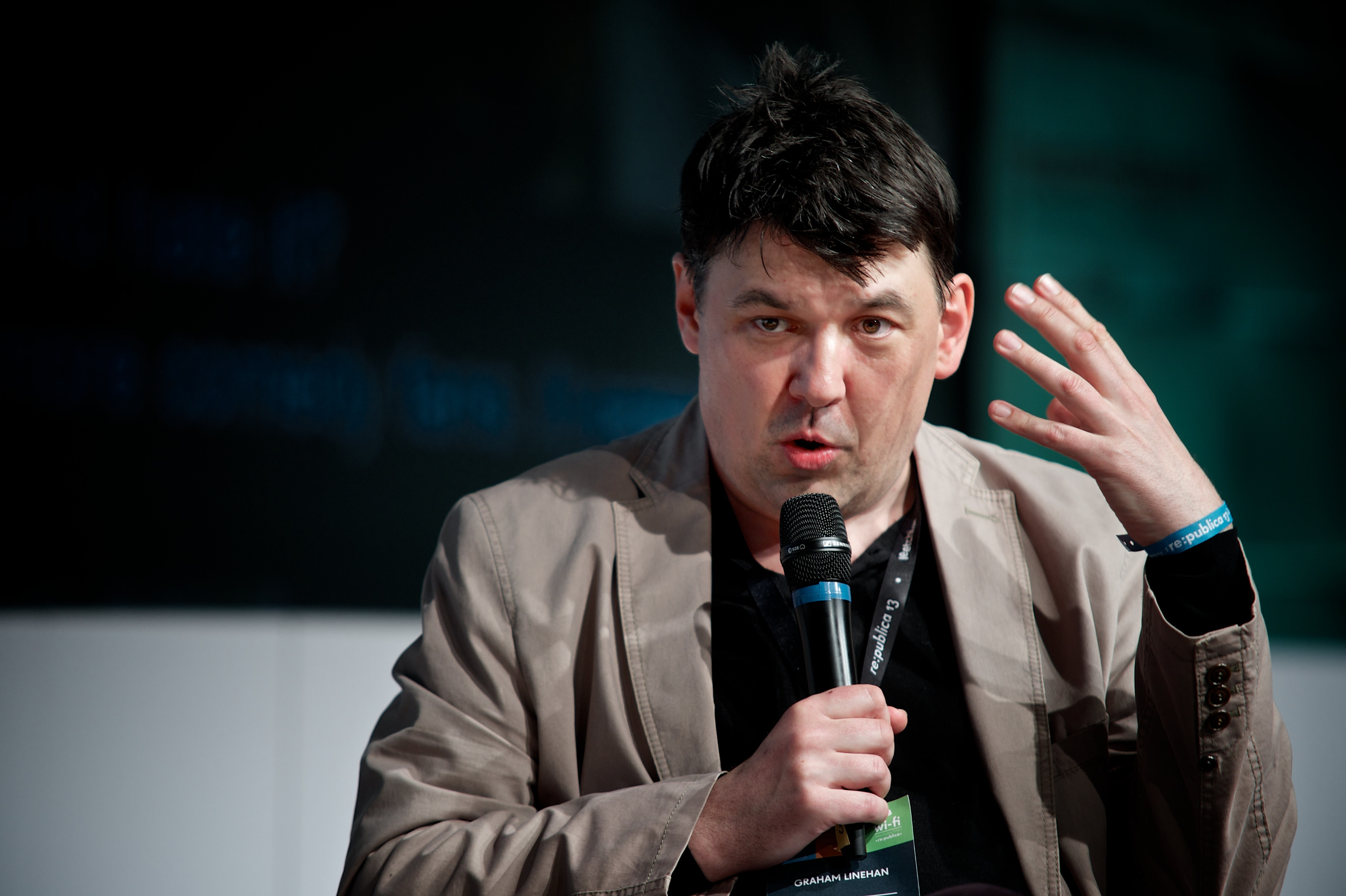
The episode features Graham Linehan's (pictured) children, Wendy and Henry, as the voices of Goliad and Stormo respectively.

"Goliad" was written and storyboarded by Tom Herpich and Skyler Page, from a story developed by Herpich, series creator Pendleton Ward, Patrick McHale, and Kent Osborne. "Goliad" marked the first time that Herpich storyboarded an episode that he developed on his own. Originally, the episode was inspired by a time Herpich's father yelled at him and made him angry. However, once he brought it to the writing staff, significant revisions took place, and the resultant plot changed substantially. On the DVD commentary, both Herpich and storyboard artist Rebecca Sugar noted that the episode was largely an exploration of absolute control and free will.

The episode features Graham Linehan's daughter Wendy as the voice of Goliad and his son Henry as Stormo. Ward approached Linehan about casting his children after Linehan had retweeted a video made by Wendy and Henry that featured them impersonating various Adventure Time characters. During the recording session, Linehan was being directed over the phone by the producers of Adventure Time, and he in turn gave direction to his children. Linehan had planned to write a follow-up episode about Goliad and Stormo, and while he sent some preliminary ideas to Ward, this episode was never made.

== Reception ==
"Goliad" aired on Cartoon Network on June 4, 2012. Together with other episodes of Cartoon Network programming, the episode helped the network rank as the number one in terms of boys aged 2 to 11, 6 to 11, and 9 to 14, for the week. The episode first saw physical release as part of the 2012 Jake vs. Me-Mow DVD, which included 16 episodes from the series' first four seasons. It was later re-released as part of the complete fourth season DVD in October 2014.

Zack Handlen of The A.V. Club awarded the episode an "A−". After lauding the strengths of the series as a whole, Handlen noted, "I’ll admit to being something at a loss as to how to review an episode, but at least I’m pretty sure 'Goliad' was a good one." Despite this, he felt that it "didn’t quite come up to the level of glorious madness that the best episodes achieve". Handlen called one sequence—wherein Finn tries to prevent himself from thinking of Princess Bubblegum's plan, lest the mind-reading Goliad be able to best him—"the best gag in the episode", largely due to the humorous visuals included in the scene. Ultimately, Handlen concluded that the reveal that Stormo was made from Finn's DNA was an example of "a straight-faced-but-still-totally-ridiculous episode" being able to embrace a small moment of heart.

The episode was later nominated for an Annie Award for "Storyboarding in an Animated Television/Broadcast Production" at the 2013 award ceremony, although the episode did not win.
