= Five Short Graybles =

- Adventure Time episode
- Episode no.: Season 4 Episode 2
- Directed by: Larry Leichliter (Note: Director); Nate Cash (Note: Creative director); Nick Jennings (Note: Art director)
- Written by: Tom Herpich; Skyler Page; Cole Sanchez
- Story by: Patrick McHale; Kent Osborne; Pendleton Ward
- Production code: 1008-079
- Original air date: April 9, 2012
- Running time: 11 minutes

Guest appearance
- Emo Philips as Cuber

Episode chronology
← Previous "Hot to the Touch"	Next → "Web Weirdos"
- Adventure Time season 4

"Five Short Graybles" is the second episode of the fourth season of the American animated television series Adventure Time. The episode was written and storyboarded by Tom Herpich, Skyler Page, and Cole Sanchez, from a story by Patrick McHale, Kent Osborne, and Pendleton Ward. It originally aired on Cartoon Network on April 9, 2012. The episode guest stars Emo Philips as Cuber.

The series follows the adventures of Finn (voiced by Jeremy Shada), a human boy, and his best friend and adoptive brother Jake (voiced by John DiMaggio), a dog with magical powers to change shape and grow and shrink at will. This episode is a series of short stories—concerning BMO (voiced by Niki Yang), Finn and Jake, Princess Bubblegum (voiced by Hynden Walch), the Ice King (voiced by Tom Kenny), and Lumpy Space Princess (voiced by Pendleton Ward)—all centered on a common theme of the five senses, hosted by a mysterious man named Cuber from the future.

The episode's premise was conceived when Ward was forced to cut a scene involving a high-five from a previous script. Ward enjoyed the scene so much that he decided to write an entire episode based around high-fives. Originally, it was planned for live action footage of Ward to appear in the episode, introducing each clip. This, however, was later scrapped in favor of the character of Cuber.

== Plot ==
The episode begins with a futuristic character named Cuber (voiced by Emo Philips) announcing to the audience that they will be watching five short vignettes that are all unified by one theme. Cuber challenges the audience to then guess the theme.

The first short focuses on BMO (voiced by Niki Yang), who talks to itself in the mirror, pretending as if it is talking to another character called "Football". BMO insists that it is a real, living boy, and attempts to demonstrate this to Football by brushing its teeth and using the toilet. Unbeknownst to BMO, Finn and Jake are watching the activity from outside a window. The focus then shifts to Finn and Jake, who attempt to experience the ultimate high five. Eventually, Finn places himself in a catapult, and Jake stretches himself into a slingshot, and the two launch themselves across Ooo.

The next vignette focuses on Princess Bubblegum (voiced by Hynden Walch) as she tries to create the perfect sandwich using bizarre science. After exhausting herself going to extreme and ridiculous lengths to produce and combine all the ingredients perfectly, she offers the sandwich to Cinnamon Bun (voiced by Dee Bradley Baker), who merely shoves it into his pastry body and belches foodstuff onto the princess. The action then shifts to the Ice King (voiced by Tom Kenny), who smells a stench in his ice castle. After mistakenly assuming that the smell was being caused by Gunter the penguin's flatulence, the Ice King realizes that his armpits are actually the source of the smell. After taking a shower, he ponders aloud as to how he got so smelly. Gunter then proceeds to flatulate underneath his arms.

The final vignette focuses on Lumpy Space Princess (voiced by Pendleton Ward) as she attempts to win a talent show by singing a song entitled "These Lumps". Before she can perform, however, a group of candy citizens steal her song. Lumpy Space Princess becomes enraged and throws a basketball into the audience, which hits an audience member and accidentally makes a basket in the process. Due to the impressiveness of this action, Peppermint Butler (voiced by Steve Little) names her the winner. Just then, Finn and Jake collide in mid-air, producing a high five that reverberates across Ooo. The duo are named the winner, much to Lumpy Space Princess' chagrin.

The episode comes to a close with Cuber revealing that the theme was the five senses: BMO saw Football in the mirror, Finn and Jake touched each other's hands, Princess Bubblegum made a tasty sandwich, Ice King smelled something foul, and Lumpy Space Princess heard music.

== Production ==
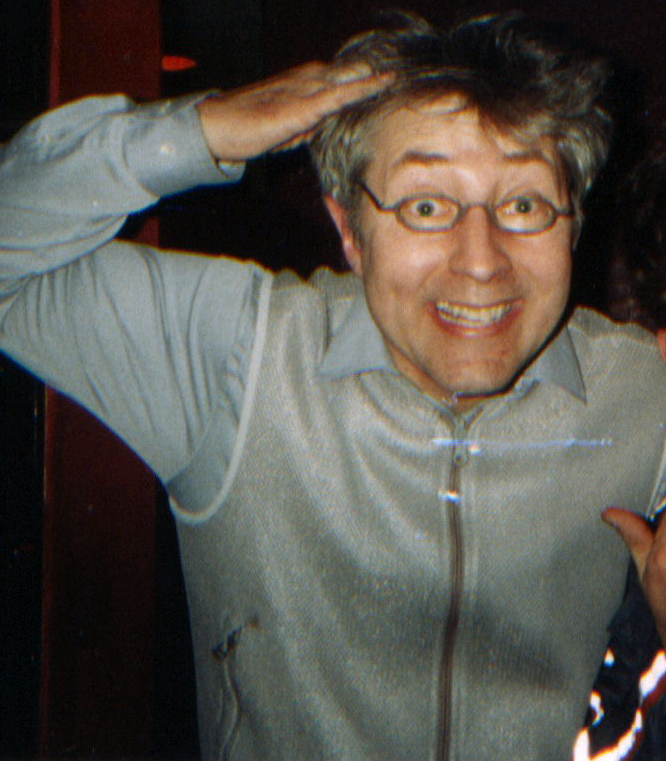
The episode guest stars Emo Philips as Cuber.

"Five Short Graybles" was written and storyboarded by Tom Herpich, Skyler Page, and Cole Sanchez, from a story developed by series creator Pendleton Ward, Patrick McHale, and Kent Osborne. The episode was directed by Larry Leichliter. This was the first episode that Page worked on for the series; he was so excited to be working on the series that after he finished the storyboard, he traveled to Hawaii as a personal reward. Sanchez storyboarded the scenes with Ice King, as well as the scenes with Lumpy Space Princess—sections, he argued, that are thematically united because the characters are "being a little bit mean" to others.

The episode can trace its genesis to a short, but humorous scene involving a high five that Ward had been forced to cut from an episode. Ward was unhappy about the edit, and later jokingly said via his Twitter that he would make an episode entirely about high-fives. Although Ward was being facetious at the time, the idea of using a high five as an overarching plot point was subsequently used in "Five Short Graybles". Originally, it was planned for live action footage of Ward to appear in the episode; he would have introduced each clip, serving as a framing device. This idea, however, was eventually vetoed. Herpich came up with the idea to replace Ward with a futuristic character named Cuber, whose dialogue would be mixed with odd and nonsensical words, implying that he was speaking a "dialect from thousand of years in the future". According to Herpich, the word "graybles" is a supposed distortion of the word "fables".

Cuber was voiced by Emo Philips, a comedian known for his "offbeat [vocal] cadence and high-pitched conversational tone". Philips would later reprise his role for the fifth season episodes "Five More Short Graybles", "Another Five More Short Graybles", and the sixth season episode "Graybles 1000+". Every one of Philips's voice recording takes was so different that Nate Cash, one of the series' creative directors, was forced to piece together disparate recordings to make the final composition.

The episode also contains the short song "These Lumps", sung by Lumpy Space Princess. Ward struggled to sing the song because he was trying to hold the pitch while also maintaining Lumpy Space Princess’s accent.

== Reception ==
"Five Short Graybles" first aired on Cartoon Network on April 9, 2012. Together with other episodes of Cartoon Network programming, the episodes helped make the network the number one television destination for boys aged 2–11, 6-11, and 9-14 on Monday nights, according to Nielsen ratings. The episode first saw physical release as part of the eponymous 2012 DVD, Jake vs. Me-Mow, which included 16 episodes from the series' first four seasons. It was later re-released as part of the complete fourth season DVD in October 2014.

Oliver Sava of The A.V. Club awarded the episode an "A", describing it as "very weird" and "bizarre". Sava wrote that it is "unbelievable that all of [the activity in the episode] happens in 10 minutes, which goes to show just how much material is packed into every episode of this series." He also noted that Cuber revealing the uniting theme was "a reminder to all the adults in the audience that the show that’s making them laugh so hard is targeted to kids in grade school".
