= Ako Castuera =

American artist

- Born: September 20, 1978 (age 47); California, U.S.
- Known for: Animation, Ceramics, Paintings
- Website: thinging.wordpress.com

Ako Castuera (b. 1978) is an American artist who is best known for being a writer and storyboard artist on the animated television series Adventure Time.

== Early life ==
Castuera's father is from Mexico, and his ancestors originated from the Spanish city Castuera. Her mother is of Okinawan descent. According to an article published by the Smithsonian Asian Pacific American Center, she was "born at home in a commune to non-hippy parents."

== History ==
Castuera graduated from the California College of the Arts, and it was at this university that she got involved with Giant Robot, a bi-monthly magazine of Asian and Asian American popular culture. After graduating, she moved to Los Angeles and eventually landed a job as a character designer on the Adult Swim series Metalocalypse after she drew a card for the series' lead character designer, Songgu Kwon. After an indie comic of hers was well received by Pendleton Ward, she was hired as a storyboard revisionist on the Cartoon Network series Adventure Time. She was eventually promoted to storyboard artist, and served in that position until she left in 2013 to focus fully on her art career. In October 2014, however, she returned to the series to temporarily storyboard several episodes during the show's seventh season, and during the show's eighth season, worked as a storyboard revisionist.

== Accolades ==
At the inaugural Children's and Family Emmy Awards ceremony held in 2022, Castuera received an Emmy for "Outstanding Directing for an Animated Program" (alongside Luis Grane, Elizabeth Ito, Bob Logan, and Pendleton Ward).

== Filmography ==
=== Television ===
| Year | Title | Role |
|---|---|---|
| 2006–08 | Metalocalypse | character designer |
| 2009 | The Marvelous Misadventures of Flapjack | writer, storyboard artist ("Parfait Storm") |
| 2009–13, 2014–15, 2016–17 | Adventure Time | writer, storyboard artist, storyboard revisionist, voice actress |
| 2020, 2023 | Summer Camp Island | writer, storyboard artist |
| 2021–present | City of Ghosts | writer, director, storyboard artist |
