= List of Adventure Time episodes =

Adventure Time is an American animated television media franchise created by Pendleton Ward for Cartoon Network. The first series, Adventure Time (2010–2018), follows the coming-of-age adventures of Finn (voiced by Jeremy Shada), a human boy, and his best friend and adoptive brother Jake (John DiMaggio), a dog with magical powers to change shape and grow and shrink at will. Finn and Jake live in the post-apocalyptic Land of Ooo. Throughout the series, they interact with the show's other main characters: Princess Bubblegum (Hynden Walch), the sovereign of the Candy Kingdom and a sentient piece of gum; the Ice King (Tom Kenny), a demented but largely misunderstood ice wizard; Marceline the Vampire Queen (Olivia Olson), a thousand-year-old vampire and rock music enthusiast; Lumpy Space Princess (Pendleton Ward), a melodramatic and immature princess made out of "irradiated stardust"; BMO (Niki Yang), a sentient video game console-shaped robot that lives with Finn and Jake; and Flame Princess (Jessica DiCicco), a flame elemental and ruler of the Fire Kingdom. The pilot first aired in 2007 on Nicktoons Network, where it was later re-aired on the incubator series Random! Cartoons. The pilot was eventually uploaded onto the internet and became a cult hit on YouTube. After Nickelodeon declined to turn the short into a full-fledged show, Cartoon Network purchased the rights, and Adventure Time launched as a series on April 5, 2010. The series concluded its eight-year and ten-season run on September 3, 2018. The series was followed by three spinoffs: Adventure Time: Distant Lands (2020–21), Adventure Time: Fionna and Cake (2023–) and Adventure Time: Side Quests (2026).

Each Adventure Time episode is about eleven minutes in length; pairs of episodes are often telecast in order to fill a half-hour program time slot. For the first five seasons, the show aired on Monday nights. (Note: An exception to this is the third season episode "Thank You" which aired on a Wednesday as a holiday special.) However, starting with the early sixth-season episode "Breezy", the show began to shift both its timeslot and its day of airing. Upon its debut, Adventure Time was a ratings success for Cartoon Network, with its highest-rated episodes scoring over 3 million viewers. Adventure Time has won three Annie Awards, eight Primetime Emmy Awards, two British Academy Children's Awards, a Motion Picture Sound Editors Award, a Pixel Award, a Peabody Award, and a Kerrang! Award. The series has also been nominated for three Critics' Choice Television Awards, two Annecy Festival Awards, a TCA Award, and a Sundance Film Festival Award, among others. Domestically, several compilation DVDs containing a random assortment of episodes have been released; additionally, all the seasons have been released in North America on DVD and seasons one to six were released on Blu-ray. All seasons were released on Blu-ray in Australia only. A North American box set containing the entire series was also released on DVD on April 30, 2019. During its run, Adventure Time was a co-production between Frederator Studios and Cartoon Network Studios.

== Series overview ==
Season	Episodes	Originally released		
Season	Episodes	First released	Last released	Network
Pilot		January 11, 2007		Nicktoons
1	26	April 5, 2010 (Note: The episode "Business Time" aired on March 11, 2010 as a "preview", several weeks before the official debut of the series.)	September 27, 2010	Cartoon; Network
2	26	October 11, 2010	May 9, 2011	Cartoon; Network
3	26	July 11, 2011	February 13, 2012	Cartoon; Network
4	26	April 2, 2012	October 22, 2012	Cartoon; Network
5	52	November 12, 2012	March 17, 2014	Cartoon; Network
6	43	April 21, 2014	June 5, 2015	Cartoon; Network
7	26 (Note: The show's seventh season was originally intended to comprise 39 episodes, ranging from "Bonnie & Neddy" to "Reboot". However, when it came time to upload the seventh season onto streaming sites like CartoonNetwork.com, Cartoon Network chose to end the season with the episode "The Thin Yellow Line", for a total of 26 episodes. This new episode count for the season was cemented by the release of the complete seventh season DVD on July 18, 2017, which included episodes "Bonnie & Neddy" through "The Thin Yellow Line".) (Note: The two halves of the season seven episode "The More You Moe, The Moe You Know" were produced as two separate episodes, each with its own production code. However, the official season seven DVD counts the two parts of "The More You Moe, The Moe You Know" as making up a single, collective episode, resulting in the DVD packaging listing only 25 episodes. "The More You Moe, The Moe You Know" is being listed here as comprising two episodes to be consistent with the treatment of previous two-parters (e.g., season five's "Lemonhope", season three's "Holly Jolly Secrets").)	November 2, 2015	March 19, 2016	Cartoon; Network
8	27 (Note: The show's eighth season was originally intended to be 28 episodes long, comprising "Two Swords" through "Three Buckets". However, following the season seven re-shuffle, Cartoon Network recognized the season as comprising the 13 episodes that had originally made up the end of season seven (viz. "Broke His Crown" through "Reboot") and the 14 episodes that had made up the beginning of the original season eight (viz. "Two Swords" through the Islands miniseries). Cartoon Network then labelled the episodes "Orb" through "Three Buckets" as making up the show's ninth season.)	March 26, 2016	February 2, 2017	Cartoon; Network
9	14	April 21, 2017	July 21, 2017	Cartoon; Network
10	16 (Note: The special "Diamonds & Lemons", which is not considered a part of this season, aired on July 20, 2018, before the four-part finale on September 3, 2018, making the special the show's 279th episode and the first part of the finale its 280th.)	September 17, 2017	September 3, 2018	Cartoon; Network

== Episodes ==
=== Pilot (2007) ===
No.	Title	Directed by	Written and storyboarded by	Original release date
–	"Adventure Time"	Larry Leichliter, Hugo Morales, & Pendleton Ward	Pendleton Ward	January 11, 2007 (Note: The pilot initially was aired as a stand-alone short on Nicktoons Network January 11, 2007, before it was re-aired as part of the Nicktoons' series Random! Cartoons on December 7, 2008.)
Pen (later renamed to Finn) and Jake have to rescue Princess Bubblegum from the Ice King.

=== Season 1 (2010) ===
No. overall	No. in season	Title	Directed by	Written and storyboarded by	Original release date	Prod. code	US viewers (millions)
1	1	"Slumber Party Panic"	Larry Leichliter^{d} Patrick McHale^{c}	Adam Muto & Elizabeth Ito	April 5, 2010	692-009	2.50
2	2	"Trouble in Lumpy Space"	Larry Leichliter^{d} Patrick McHale^{c}	Adam Muto & Elizabeth Ito	April 5, 2010	692-015	2.50
3	3	"Prisoners of Love"	Larry Leichliter^{d} Patrick McHale^{c}	Pendleton Ward & Adam Muto	April 12, 2010	692-005	1.85
4	4	"Tree Trunks"	Larry Leichliter^{d} Patrick McHale^{c}	Bert Youn & Sean Jimenez	April 12, 2010	692-016	1.85
5	5	"The Enchiridion!"	Larry Leichliter^{d} Patrick McHale^{c}	Pendleton Ward, Adam Muto, & Patrick McHale	April 19, 2010	692-001	2.10
6	6	"The Jiggler"	Larry Leichliter^{d} Patrick McHale^{c}	Luther McLaurin & Armen Mirzaian	April 19, 2010	692-011	2.10
7	7	"Ricardio the Heart Guy"	Larry Leichliter^{d} Patrick McHale^{c}	Bert Youn & Sean Jimenez	April 26, 2010	692-007	1.91
8	8	"Business Time"	Larry Leichliter^{d} Patrick McHale^{c}	Luther McLaurin & Armen Mirzaian	April 26, 2010 (Note: The episode originally premiered on March 11, 2010 as a sneak peek.)	692-014	1.91
9	9	"My Two Favorite People"	Larry Leichliter^{d} Patrick McHale^{c}	Pendleton Ward & Kent Osborne	May 3, 2010	692-004	1.65
10	10	"Memories of Boom Boom Mountain"	Larry Leichliter^{d} Patrick McHale^{c}	Bert Youn & Sean Jimenez	May 3, 2010	692-010	1.65
11	11	"Wizard"	Larry Leichliter^{d} Patrick McHale^{c}	Bert Youn, Pete Browngardt, & Adam Muto	May 10, 2010	692-020	1.82
12	12	"Evicted!"	Larry Leichliter^{d} Patrick McHale^{c}	Bert Youn & Sean Jimenez	May 17, 2010 (Note: The episode originally premiered on March 18, 2010 as a sneak peek.)	692-003	1.88
13	13	"City of Thieves"	Larry Leichliter^{d} Patrick McHale^{c}	Bert Youn & Sean Jimenez	May 24, 2010	692-012	1.83
14	14	"The Witch's Garden"	Larry Leichliter^{d} Patrick McHale^{c}	Kent Osborne, Niki Yang, & Adam Muto	June 7, 2010	692-022	1.81
15	15	"What Is Life?"	Larry Leichliter^{d} Patrick McHale^{c}	Luther McLaurin & Armen Mirzaian	June 14, 2010	692-017	1.64
16	16	"Ocean of Fear"	Larry Leichliter^{d} Patrick McHale^{c}	J. G. Quintel & Cole Sanchez	June 21, 2010	692-025	2.00
17	17	"When Wedding Bells Thaw"	Larry Leichliter^{d} Patrick McHale^{c}	Kent Osborne & Niki Yang	June 28, 2010	692-013	1.92
18	18	"Dungeon"	Larry Leichliter^{d} Patrick McHale^{c}	Elizabeth Ito & Adam Muto	July 12, 2010	692-023	2.48
19	19	"The Duke"	Larry Leichliter^{d} Patrick McHale^{c}	Elizabeth Ito & Adam Muto	July 19, 2010	692-019	1.84
20	20	"Freak City"	Larry Leichliter^{d} Patrick McHale^{c}	Pendleton Ward & Tom Herpich	July 26, 2010	692-008	2.03
21	21	"Donny"	Larry Leichliter^{d} Patrick McHale^{c}	Kent Osborne, Niki Yang, & Adam Muto	August 9, 2010	692-018	N/A
22	22	"Henchman"	Larry Leichliter^{d} Patrick McHale^{c}	Luther McLaurin & Cole Sanchez	August 23, 2010	692-021	2.17
23	23	"Rainy Day Daydream"	Larry Leichliter^{d} Patrick McHale^{c}	Pendleton Ward	September 6, 2010	692-002	2.17
24	24	"What Have You Done?"	Larry Leichliter^{d} Patrick McHale^{c}	Adam Muto & Elizabeth Ito	September 13, 2010	692-006	1.89
25	25	"His Hero"	Larry Leichliter^{d} Patrick McHale^{c}	Kent Osborne, Niki Yang, & Adam Muto	September 20, 2010	692-026	1.83
26	26	"Gut Grinder"	Larry Leichliter^{d} Patrick McHale^{c}	Bert Youn & Ako Castuera	September 27, 2010	692-024	1.77

=== Season 2 (2010–11) ===
No. overall	No. in season	Title	Directed by	Written and storyboarded by	Original release date	Prod. code	US viewers (millions)
27	1	"It Came from the Nightosphere"	Larry Leichliter^{d} Patrick McHale^{c}	Adam Muto & Rebecca Sugar	October 11, 2010	1002-029	2.00
28	2	"The Eyes"	Larry Leichliter^{d} Patrick McHale & Cole Sanchez^{c}	Kent Osborne & Somvilay Xayaphone	October 18, 2010	1002-031	2.26
29	3	"Loyalty to the King"	Larry Leichliter^{d} Patrick McHale^{c}	Kent Osborne & Somvilay Xayaphone	October 25, 2010	1002-027	2.54
30	4	"Blood Under the Skin"	Larry Leichliter^{d} Patrick McHale^{c}	Cole Sanchez & Benton Connor	November 1, 2010	1002-028	1.95
31	5	"Storytelling"	Larry Leichliter^{d} Patrick McHale & Cole Sanchez^{c}	Ako Castuera & Tom Herpich	November 8, 2010	1002-030	2.15
32	6	"Slow Love"	Larry Leichliter^{d} Patrick McHale & Cole Sanchez^{c}	Cole Sanchez & Benton Connor	November 15, 2010	1002-032	2.09
33	7	"Power Animal"	Larry Leichliter^{d} Patrick McHale & Cole Sanchez^{c}	Adam Muto & Rebecca Sugar	November 22, 2010	1002-033	2.23
34	8	"Crystals Have Power"	Larry Leichliter^{d} Patrick McHale & Cole Sanchez^{c}	Cole Sanchez & Jesse Moynihan	November 29, 2010	1002-036	2.00
35	9	"The Other Tarts"	Larry Leichliter^{d} Patrick McHale & Cole Sanchez^{c}	Ako Castuera & Tom Herpich	January 3, 2011	1002-038	N/A
36	10	"To Cut a Woman's Hair"	Larry Leichliter^{d} Patrick McHale & Cole Sanchez^{c}	Kent Osborne & Somvilay Xayaphone	January 10, 2011	1002-035	1.89
37	11	"The Chamber of Frozen Blades"	Larry Leichliter^{d} Patrick McHale & Cole Sanchez^{c}	Adam Muto & Rebecca Sugar	January 17, 2011	1002-037	N/A
38	12	"Her Parents"	Larry Leichliter^{d} Patrick McHale & Cole Sanchez^{c}	Ako Castuera & Tom Herpich	January 24, 2011	1002-034	2.18
39	13	"The Pods"	Larry Leichliter^{d} Patrick McHale & Cole Sanchez^{c}	Kent Osborne & Somvilay Xayaphone	January 31, 2011	1002-039	1.94
40	14	"The Silent King"	Larry Leichliter^{d} Patrick McHale & Cole Sanchez^{c}	Cole Sanchez & Jesse Moynihan	February 7, 2011	1002-040	N/A
41	15	"The Real You"	Larry Leichliter^{d} Patrick McHale & Cole Sanchez^{c}	Adam Muto & Rebecca Sugar	February 14, 2011	1002-041	1.83
42	16	"Guardians of Sunshine"	Larry Leichliter^{d} Patrick McHale & Cole Sanchez^{c}	Ako Castuera & Tom Herpich	February 21, 2011	1002-042	1.73
43	17	"Death in Bloom"	Larry Leichliter^{d} Patrick McHale & Cole Sanchez^{c}	Cole Sanchez & Jesse Moynihan	February 28, 2011	1002-044	1.98
44	18	"Susan Strong"	Larry Leichliter^{d} Patrick McHale & Cole Sanchez^{c}	Adam Muto & Rebecca Sugar	March 7, 2011	1002-045	2.38
45	19	"Mystery Train"	Larry Leichliter^{d} Patrick McHale & Cole Sanchez^{c}	Kent Osborne & Somvilay Xayaphone	March 14, 2011	1002-043	1.96
46	20	"Go with Me"	Larry Leichliter^{d} Patrick McHale & Cole Sanchez^{c}	Ako Castuera & Tom Herpich	March 28, 2011	1002-046	1.27
47	21	"Belly of the Beast"	Larry Leichliter^{d} Patrick McHale & Cole Sanchez^{c}	Kent Osborne & Somvilay Xayaphone	April 4, 2011	1002-047	1.64
48	22	"The Limit"	Larry Leichliter^{d} Patrick McHale & Cole Sanchez^{c}	Cole Sanchez & Jesse Moynihan	April 11, 2011	1002-048	1.69
49	23	"Video Makers"	Larry Leichliter^{d} Patrick McHale & Cole Sanchez^{c}	Kent Osborne & Somvilay Xayaphone (Note: David C. Smith storyboarded the final act, but is credited only as revisionist.)	April 18, 2011	1002-051	1.73
50	24	"Mortal Folly" (Part 1)	Larry Leichliter^{d} Patrick McHale & Cole Sanchez^{c}	Adam Muto & Rebecca Sugar	May 2, 2011	1002-049	1.92
51	25	"Mortal Recoil" (Part 2)	Larry Leichliter^{d} Patrick McHale & Cole Sanchez^{c}	Cole Sanchez & Jesse Moynihan	May 2, 2011	1002-052	1.92
52	26	"Heat Signature"	Larry Leichliter^{d} Patrick McHale & Cole Sanchez^{c}	Ako Castuera & Tom Herpich	May 9, 2011	1002-050	1.98

=== Season 3 (2011–12) ===
No. overall	No. in season	Title	Directed by	Written and storyboarded by	Original release date	Prod. code	US viewers (millions)
53	1	"Conquest of Cuteness"	Larry Leichliter^{d} Cole Sanchez^{c}	Ako Castuera & Tom Herpich	July 11, 2011	1008-053	2.69
54	2	"Morituri Te Salutamus"	Larry Leichliter^{d} Cole Sanchez^{c}	Adam Muto & Rebecca Sugar	July 18, 2011	1008-054	1.78
55	3	"Memory of a Memory"	Larry Leichliter^{d} Cole Sanchez^{c}	Ako Castuera & Tom Herpich	July 25, 2011	1008-057	2.26
56	4	"Hitman"	Larry Leichliter^{d} Cole Sanchez^{c}	Jesse Moynihan & Bert Youn	August 1, 2011	1008-055	2.27
57	5	"Too Young"	Larry Leichliter^{d} Cole Sanchez^{c}	Tom Herpich & Jesse Moynihan	August 8, 2011	1008-059	2.09
58	6	"The Monster"	Larry Leichliter^{d} Cole Sanchez^{c}	Kent Osborne & Somvilay Xayaphone	August 15, 2011	1008-056	2.24
59	7	"Still"	Larry Leichliter^{d} Cole Sanchez^{c}	Kent Osborne & Somvilay Xayaphone	August 22, 2011	1008-060	2.29
60	8	"Wizard Battle"	Larry Leichliter^{d} Cole Sanchez^{c}	Ako Castuera & Jesse Moynihan	August 29, 2011	1008-061	2.30
61	9	"Fionna and Cake"	Larry Leichliter^{d} Cole Sanchez^{c}	Adam Muto & Rebecca Sugar	September 5, 2011	1008-058	3.32
62	10	"What Was Missing"	Larry Leichliter^{d} Cole Sanchez^{c}	Adam Muto & Rebecca Sugar	September 26, 2011	1008-062	2.19
63	11	"Apple Thief"	Larry Leichliter^{d} Cole Sanchez^{c}	Tom Herpich & Bert Youn	October 3, 2011	1008-067	2.00
64	12	"The Creeps"	Larry Leichliter^{d} Cole Sanchez^{c}	Ako Castuera & Jesse Moynihan	October 17, 2011	1008-070	2.03
65	13	"From Bad to Worse"	Larry Leichliter^{d} Cole Sanchez^{c}	Kent Osborne & Somvilay Xayaphone	October 24, 2011	1008-064	2.22
66	14	"Beautopia"	Larry Leichliter^{d} Cole Sanchez^{c}	Adam Muto & Rebecca Sugar	November 7, 2011	1008-065	1.92
67	15	"No One Can Hear You"	Larry Leichliter^{d} Cole Sanchez^{c}	Ako Castuera & Jesse Moynihan	November 14, 2011	1008-066	2.48
68	16	"Jake vs. Me-Mow"	Larry Leichliter^{d} Cole Sanchez^{c}	Adam Muto & Rebecca Sugar	November 21, 2011	1008-071	2.26
69	17	"Thank You"	Larry Leichliter^{d} Cole Sanchez^{c}	Tom Herpich	November 23, 2011	1008-063	2.33
70	18	"The New Frontier"	Larry Leichliter^{d} Cole Sanchez^{c}	Tom Herpich & Bert Youn	November 28, 2011	1008-072	2.39
71 72	19 20	"Holly Jolly Secrets"	Larry Leichliter^{d}	Kent Osborne & Somvilay Xayaphone	December 5, 2011	1008-068 1008-069	2.51
73	21	"Marceline's Closet"	Larry Leichliter^{d} Adam Muto^{c}	Ako Castuera & Jesse Moynihan	December 12, 2011	1008-073	2.50
74	22	"Paper Pete"	Larry Leichliter^{d} Adam Muto^{c}	Kent Osborne & Somvilay Xayaphone	January 16, 2012	1008-075	N/A
75	23	"Another Way"	Larry Leichliter^{d} Adam Muto^{c}	Tom Herpich & Bert Youn	January 23, 2012	1008-076	N/A
76	24	"Ghost Princess"	Larry Leichliter^{d} Nate Cash^{c}	Ako Castuera & Jesse Moynihan	January 30, 2012	1008-077	N/A
77	25	"Dad's Dungeon"	Larry Leichliter^{d}	Pendleton Ward, Adam Muto, & Natasha Allegri	February 6, 2012	1008-078	2.60
78	26	"Incendium"	Larry Leichliter^{d} Adam Muto^{c}	Adam Muto & Rebecca Sugar	February 13, 2012	1008-074	N/A

=== Season 4 (2012) ===
No. overall	No. in season	Title	Directed by	Written and storyboarded by	Original release date	Prod. code	US viewers (millions)
79	1	"Hot to the Touch"	Larry Leichliter^{d} Adam Muto^{c}	Cole Sanchez & Rebecca Sugar	April 2, 2012	1008-082	2.66
80	2	"Five Short Graybles"	Larry Leichliter^{d} Nate Cash^{c}	Tom Herpich, Skyler Page & Cole Sanchez	April 9, 2012	1008-079	N/A
81	3	"Web Weirdos"	Larry Leichliter^{d} Nate Cash^{c}	Ako Castuera & Jesse Moynihan	April 16, 2012	1008-081	N/A
82	4	"Dream of Love"	Larry Leichliter^{d} Adam Muto^{c}	Bert Youn & Somvilay Xayaphone	April 23, 2012	1008-080	N/A
83	5	"Return to the Nightosphere" (Part 1)	Larry Leichliter^{d} Nate Cash^{c}	Ako Castuera & Jesse Moynihan	April 30, 2012	1008-085	N/A
84	6	"Daddy's Little Monster" (Part 2)	Larry Leichliter^{d} Adam Muto^{c}	Cole Sanchez & Rebecca Sugar	April 30, 2012	1008-086	N/A
85	7	"In Your Footsteps"	Larry Leichliter^{d} Nate Cash^{c}	Tom Herpich & Skyler Page	May 7, 2012	1008-083	N/A
86	8	"Hug Wolf"	Larry Leichliter^{d} Adam Muto^{c}	Somvilay Xayaphone & Bert Youn	May 14, 2012	1008-084	N/A
87	9	"Princess Monster Wife"	Larry Leichliter^{d} Adam Muto^{c}	Somvilay Xayaphone & Bert Youn	May 28, 2012	1008-088	N/A
88	10	"Goliad"	Larry Leichliter^{d} Nate Cash^{c}	Tom Herpich & Skyler Page	June 4, 2012	1008-087	N/A
89	11	"Beyond This Earthly Realm"	Larry Leichliter^{d} Nate Cash^{c}	Ako Castuera & Jesse Moynihan	June 11, 2012	1008-089	N/A
90	12	"Gotcha!"	Larry Leichliter^{d} Adam Muto^{c}	Cole Sanchez & Rebecca Sugar	June 18, 2012	1008-090	2.39
91	13	"Princess Cookie"	Larry Leichliter^{d} Nate Cash^{c}	Tom Herpich & Skyler Page	June 25, 2012	1008-091	N/A
92	14	"Card Wars"	Larry Leichliter^{d} Adam Muto^{c}	Somvilay Xayaphone & Bert Youn	July 16, 2012	1008-092	N/A
93	15	"Sons of Mars"	Larry Leichliter^{d} Nate Cash^{c}	Ako Castuera & Jesse Moynihan	July 23, 2012	1008-093	N/A
94	16	"Burning Low"	Larry Leichliter^{d} Adam Muto^{c}	Cole Sanchez & Rebecca Sugar	July 30, 2012	1008-094	3.50
95	17	"BMO Noire"	Larry Leichliter^{d} Nate Cash^{c}	Tom Herpich & Skyler Page	August 6, 2012	1008-095	N/A
96	18	"King Worm"	Larry Leichliter^{d} Adam Muto^{c}	Somvilay Xayaphone, Bert Youn, & Steve Wolfhard	August 13, 2012	1008-096	N/A
97	19	"Lady & Peebles"	Larry Leichliter^{d} Adam Muto^{c}	Cole Sanchez & Rebecca Sugar	August 20, 2012	1008-098	2.75
98	20	"You Made Me"	Larry Leichliter^{d} Nate Cash^{c}	Tom Herpich & Jesse Moynihan	August 27, 2012	1008-099	N/A
99	21	"Who Would Win"	Larry Leichliter^{d} Nate Cash^{c}	Ako Castuera & Jesse Moynihan	September 3, 2012	1008-097	N/A
100	22	"Ignition Point"	Larry Leichliter^{d} Adam Muto^{c}	Somvilay Xayaphone & Bert Youn	September 17, 2012	1008-101	2.26
101	23	"The Hard Easy"	Larry Leichliter^{d} Nate Cash^{c}	Tom Herpich & Skyler Page	October 1, 2012	1008-100	2.64
102	24	"Reign of Gunters"	Larry Leichliter^{d} Nate Cash^{c}	Ako Castuera & Jesse Moynihan	October 8, 2012	1008-102	1.85
103	25	"I Remember You"	Larry Leichliter^{d} Adam Muto^{c}	Cole Sanchez & Rebecca Sugar	October 15, 2012	1008-103	2.54
104	26	"The Lich"	Larry Leichliter^{d} Nate Cash^{c}	Tom Herpich & Skyler Page	October 22, 2012	1008-104	2.59

=== Season 5 (2012–14) ===
No. overall	No. in season	Title	Directed by (Note: Larry Leichliter served as director for the first part of the season, before the title was phased out solely in favor of "supervising director".)	Written and storyboarded by	Original release date	Prod. code	US viewers (millions)
105	1	"Finn the Human" (Part 1)	Larry Leichliter^{d} Nate Cash^{s}	Tom Herpich & Jesse Moynihan	November 12, 2012	1014-105	3.44
106	2	"Jake the Dog" (Part 2)	Larry Leichliter^{d} Adam Muto^{s}	Cole Sanchez & Rebecca Sugar	November 12, 2012	1014-106	3.44
107	3	"Five More Short Graybles"	Larry Leichliter^{d} Nate Cash^{c}	Tom Herpich & Steve Wolfhard	November 19, 2012	1014-107	2.60
108	4	"Up a Tree"	Larry Leichliter^{d} Adam Muto^{c}	Skyler Page & Somvilay Xayaphone	November 26, 2012	1014-108	2.38
109	5	"All the Little People"	Larry Leichliter^{d} Nate Cash^{c}	Ako Castuera & Jesse Moynihan	December 3, 2012	1014-109	2.53
110	6	"Jake the Dad"	Larry Leichliter^{d} Nate Cash^{c}	Tom Herpich & Steve Wolfhard	January 7, 2013	1014-111	3.19
111	7	"Davey"	Larry Leichliter^{d} Adam Muto^{c}	Skyler Page & Somvilay Xayaphone (Note: On the credit screen for the episode "Davey", it is stated that the episode was storyboarded by Jesse Moynihan and Skyler Page. However, this is erroneous and the episode was actually storyboarded by Page and Somvilay Xayaphone, according to Pendleton Ward.)	January 14, 2013	1014-112	2.31
112	8	"Mystery Dungeon"	Larry Leichliter^{d} Nate Cash^{s}	Ako Castuera & Jesse Moynihan	January 21, 2013	1014-113	2.71
113	9	"All Your Fault"	Larry Leichliter^{d} Nate Cash^{c}	Tom Herpich & Steve Wolfhard	January 28, 2013	1014-115	2.71
114	10	"Little Dude"	Adam Muto^{s}	Cole Sanchez & Michael DeForge	February 4, 2013	1014-114	2.60
115	11	"Bad Little Boy"	Larry Leichliter^{d} Adam Muto^{c}	Cole Sanchez & Rebecca Sugar	February 18, 2013	1014-110	3.08
116	12	"Vault of Bones"	Adam Muto^{s}	Kent Osborne & Somvilay Xayaphone	February 25, 2013	1014-116	2.70
117	13	"The Great Bird Man"	Nate Cash^{s}	Ako Castuera & Jesse Moynihan	March 4, 2013	1014-117	2.58
118	14	"Simon & Marcy"	Adam Muto^{s}	Cole Sanchez & Rebecca Sugar (Note: According to Rebecca Sugar, Adam Muto also contributed "additional scenes" to the episode and "did a lot on this one and put it over the top.")	March 25, 2013	1014-118	2.60
119	15	"A Glitch Is a Glitch"	David OReilly^{g}	David OReilly	April 1, 2013	1014-120	2.00
120	16	"Puhoy"	Nate Cash^{s}	Tom Herpich & Steve Wolfhard	April 8, 2013	1014-119	2.75
121	17	"BMO Lost"	Nate Cash^{s}	Tom Herpich & Steve Wolfhard	April 15, 2013	1014-123	2.39
122	18	"Princess Potluck"	Adam Muto^{s}	Kent Osborne & Cole Sanchez	April 22, 2013	1014-122	2.27
123	19	"James Baxter the Horse"	Adam Muto^{s}	Pendleton Ward & Somvilay Xayaphone	May 6, 2013	1014-124	2.21
124	20	"Shh!"	Elizabeth Ito^{s}	Graham Falk	May 13, 2013	1014-129	2.35
125	21	"The Suitor"	Nate Cash^{s}	Jesse Moynihan & Thomas Wellmann	May 20, 2013	1014-130	2.41
126	22	"The Party's Over, Isla de Señorita"	Elizabeth Ito^{s}	Kent Osborne & Cole Sanchez	May 27, 2013	1014-131	2.11
127	23	"One Last Job"	Nate Cash^{s}	Ako Castuera & Jesse Moynihan	June 10, 2013	1014-121	2.38
128	24	"Another Five More Short Graybles"	Nate Cash^{s}	Tom Herpich & Steve Wolfhard	June 17, 2013	1014-132	2.27
129	25	"Candy Streets"	Elizabeth Ito^{s}	Luke Pearson & Somvilay Xayaphone	June 24, 2013	1014-133	2.09
130	26	"Wizards Only, Fools"	Nate Cash^{s}	Jesse Moynihan & Thomas Wellmann	July 1, 2013	1014-134	2.50
131	27	"Jake Suit"	Elizabeth Ito^{s}	Kent Osborne & Cole Sanchez	July 15, 2013	1014-135	2.46
132	28	"Be More"	Nate Cash^{s}	Tom Herpich & Steve Wolfhard	July 22, 2013	1014-136	2.67
133	29	"Sky Witch"	Nate Cash^{s}	Ako Castuera & Jesse Moynihan	July 29, 2013	1014-138	2.08
134	30	"Frost & Fire"	Elizabeth Ito^{s}	Somvilay Xayaphone & Luke Pearson	August 5, 2013	1014-137	3.01
135	31	"Too Old"	Nate Cash^{s}	Tom Herpich & Steve Wolfhard	August 12, 2013	1014-140	2.38
136	32	"Earth & Water"	Elizabeth Ito^{s}	Somvilay Xayaphone & Seo Kim	September 2, 2013	1014-141	1.86
137	33	"Time Sandwich"	Elizabeth Ito^{s}	Kent Osborne & Cole Sanchez	September 9, 2013	1014-139	1.98
138	34	"The Vault"	Nate Cash^{s}	Jesse Moynihan & Ako Castuera	September 16, 2013	1014-142	2.26
139	35	"Love Games"	Elizabeth Ito^{s}	Cole Sanchez, Kent Osborne, & Andy Ristaino	September 23, 2013	1014-143	2.02
140	36	"Dungeon Train"	Nate Cash^{s}	Tom Herpich & Steve Wolfhard	September 30, 2013	1014-144	2.04
141	37	"Box Prince"	Elizabeth Ito^{s}	Somvilay Xayaphone & Seo Kim	October 7, 2013	1014-145	1.99
142	38	"Red Starved"	Nate Cash^{s}	Ako Castuera & Jesse Moynihan	October 14, 2013	1014-146	1.77
143	39	"We Fixed a Truck"	Elizabeth Ito^{s}	Cole Sanchez & Andy Ristaino	October 21, 2013	1014-147	2.02
144	40	"Play Date"	Elizabeth Ito^{s}	Somvilay Xayaphone, Seo Kim, & Kent Osborne	November 4, 2013	1014-149	1.92
145	41	"The Pit"	Nate Cash^{s}	Jesse Moynihan & Ako Castuera	November 18, 2013	1014-150	2.27
146	42	"James"	Elizabeth Ito^{s}	Cole Sanchez & Andy Ristaino	November 25, 2013	1014-151	2.61
147	43	"Root Beer Guy"	Adam Muto^{s}	Graham Falk	December 2, 2013	1014-153	1.84
148	44	"Apple Wedding"	Nate Cash^{s}	Tom Herpich & Steve Wolfhard	January 13, 2014	1014-148	1.86
149	45	"Blade of Grass"	Elizabeth Ito^{s}	Somvilay Xayaphone & Seo Kim	January 20, 2014	1014-154	2.61
150	46	"Rattleballs"	Elizabeth Ito^{s}	Cole Sanchez & Andy Ristaino	January 27, 2014	1014-156	2.21
151	47	"The Red Throne"	Elizabeth Ito^{s}	Somvilay Xayaphone & Seo Kim	February 10, 2014	1014-158	2.11
152	48	"Betty"	Nate Cash^{s} Adam Muto^{s}	Ako Castuera & Jesse Moynihan	February 24, 2014	1014-155	1.71
153	49	"Bad Timing"	Adam Muto^{s}	Pendleton Ward & Kent Osborne	March 3, 2014	1014-160	1.45
154	50	"Lemonhope"	Nate Cash^{s}	Tom Herpich & Steve Wolfhard	March 10, 2014	1014-152	1.97
155	51	"Lemonhope"	Nate Cash^{s}	Tom Herpich & Steve Wolfhard	March 10, 2014	1014-157	1.97
156	52	"Billy's Bucket List"	Nate Cash^{s} Adam Muto^{s}	Ako Castuera & Jesse Moynihan	March 17, 2014	1014-159	2.34

=== Season 6 (2014–15) ===
No. overall	No. in season	Title	Supervising direction by	Written and storyboarded by	Original release date (Note: "Evergreen" first aired on November 10, 2014 on Cartoon Network in Latin America. "Astral Plane" was first uploaded on December 24, 2014 onto Cartoon Network's official Brazilian website. "The Visitor" first aired on February 3, 2015 on Cartoon Network in South Korea. "Friends Forever" and "Jermaine" aired on Cartoon Network in Latin America on April 6, 2015 and April 13, 2015 respectively. However, because this field specifically refers to domestic airdates, the information here will denote when these episodes first aired in the United States.)	Prod. code	US viewers (millions)
157	1	"Wake Up" (Part 1)	Elizabeth Ito	Cole Sanchez & Andy Ristaino	April 21, 2014	1025-166	3.32
158	2	"Escape from the Citadel" (Part 2)	Adam Muto	Tom Herpich & Steve Wolfhard	April 21, 2014	1025-163	3.32
159	3	"James II"	Elizabeth Ito	Somvilay Xayaphone & Seo Kim	April 28, 2014	1025-164	2.03
160	4	"The Tower"	Andres Salaff	Tom Herpich & Steve Wolfhard	May 5, 2014	1025-168	2.10
161	5	"Sad Face"	Adam Muto	Graham Falk	May 12, 2014	1025-162	1.77
162	6	"Breezy"	Andres Salaff	Jesse Moynihan & Derek Ballard	June 5, 2014	1025-165	2.27
163	7	"Food Chain"	Masaaki Yuasa^{g} Eunyoung Choi^{c}	Masaaki Yuasa	June 12, 2014	1025-161	1.97
164	8	"Furniture & Meat"	Elizabeth Ito	Cole Sanchez & Andy Ristaino	June 19, 2014	1025-171	1.86
165	9	"The Prince Who Wanted Everything"	Adam Muto	Bert Youn, Kent Osborne, Adam Muto, & Lyle Partridge	June 26, 2014	1025-167	2.48
166	10	"Something Big"	Andres Salaff	Jesse Moynihan	July 3, 2014	1025-170	1.95
167	11	"Little Brother"	Elizabeth Ito	Madéleine Flores & Adam Muto	July 10, 2014	1025-172	2.10
168	12	"Ocarina"	Andres Salaff	Tom Herpich & Steve Wolfhard	July 17, 2014	1025-173	1.86
169	13	"Thanks for the Crabapples, Giuseppe!"	Elizabeth Ito	Somvilay Xayaphone & Seo Kim	July 24, 2014	1025-174	2.18
170	14	"Princess Day"	Elizabeth Ito	Somvilay Xayaphone & Seo Kim	July 31, 2014	1025-169	1.91
171	15	"Nemesis"	Andres Salaff	Jesse Moynihan & Derek Ballard	August 7, 2014	1025-175	1.90
172	16	"Joshua & Margaret Investigations"	Elizabeth Ito	Cole Sanchez & Andy Ristaino	August 14, 2014	1025-176	2.05
173	17	"Ghost Fly"	Cole Sanchez	Cole Sanchez & Graham Falk	October 28, 2014	1025-181	1.30
174	18	"Everything's Jake"	Cole Sanchez	Somvilay Xayaphone & Seo Kim	November 24, 2014	1025-184	1.59
175	19	"Is That You?"	Andres Salaff	Jesse Moynihan	November 25, 2014	1025-182	1.76
176	20	"Jake the Brick"	Kent Osborne	Kent Osborne	November 26, 2014	1025-177	2.00
177	21	"Dentist"	Andres Salaff	Tom Herpich & Steve Wolfhard	November 28, 2014	1025-188	1.40
178	22	"The Cooler"	Cole Sanchez	Cole Sanchez & Andy Ristaino	December 4, 2014	1025-186	1.84
179	23	"The Pajama War"	Cole Sanchez	Somvilay Xayaphone & Seo Kim	January 8, 2015	1025-189	2.04
180	24	"Evergreen"	Andres Salaff	Tom Herpich & Steve Wolfhard	January 15, 2015	1025-178	1.75
181	25	"Astral Plane"	Andres Salaff	Jesse Moynihan & Jillian Tamaki	January 22, 2015	1025-180	1.86
182	26	"Gold Stars"	Elizabeth Ito	Somvilay Xayaphone & Seo Kim	January 29, 2015	1025-179	1.85
183	27	"The Visitor"	Andres Salaff	Tom Herpich & Steve Wolfhard	February 5, 2015	1025-183	1.71
184	28	"The Mountain"	Andres Salaff	Jesse Moynihan & Sam Alden	February 12, 2015	1025-187	1.67
185	29	"Dark Purple"	Adam Muto	Adam Muto & Sloane Leong	February 19, 2015	1025-185	2.15
186	30	"The Diary"	Cole Sanchez	Jillian Tamaki	February 26, 2015	1025-190	1.91
187	31	"Walnuts & Rain"	Andres Salaff	Tom Herpich	March 5, 2015	1025-193	1.68
188	32	"Friends Forever"	Cole Sanchez	Cole Sanchez & Andy Ristaino	April 16, 2015	1025-191	1.57
189	33	"Jermaine"	Andres Salaff	Jesse Moynihan & Brandon Graham	April 23, 2015	1025-192	1.53
190	34	"Chips & Ice Cream"	Cole Sanchez	Somvilay Xayaphone & Seo Kim	April 30, 2015	1025-194	1.69
191	35	"Graybles 1000+"	Andres Salaff	Steve Wolfhard	May 7, 2015	1025-195	1.58
192	36	"Hoots"	Adam Muto	Kent Osborne & Andy Ristaino	May 14, 2015	1025-196	1.54
193	37	"Water Park Prank"	David Ferguson^{g}	David Ferguson	May 21, 2015	1025-202	1.42
194	38	"You Forgot Your Floaties"	Andres Salaff	Jesse Moynihan	June 1, 2015	1025-197	1.57
195	39	"Be Sweet"	Elizabeth Ito	Somvilay Xayaphone & Seo Kim	June 2, 2015	1025-199	1.67
196	40	"Orgalorg"	Andres Salaff	Graham Falk	June 3, 2015	1025-198	1.30
197	41	"On the Lam"	Elizabeth Ito	Somvilay Xayaphone, Seo Kim, & Cole Sanchez	June 4, 2015	1025-201	1.48
198	42	"Hot Diggity Doom" (Part 1)	Andres Salaff	Tom Herpich & Steve Wolfhard	June 5, 2015	1025-203	1.55
199	43	"The Comet" (Part 2)	Elizabeth Ito	Jesse Moynihan & Andy Ristaino	June 5, 2015	1025-200	1.55

=== Season 7 (2015–16) ===
No. overall	No. in season	Title	Supervising direction by	Written and storyboarded by	Original release date	Prod. code	US viewers (millions)
200	1	"Bonnie & Neddy"	Andres Salaff	Tom Herpich & Steve Wolfhard	November 2, 2015	1034-209	1.07
201	2	"Varmints"	Elizabeth Ito	Kris Mukai & Adam Muto	November 3, 2015	1034-208	1.31
202	3	"Cherry Cream Soda"	Adam Muto	Graham Falk	November 4, 2015	1034-206	1.22
203	4	"Mama Said"	Elizabeth Ito	Kent Osborne & Kris Mukai	November 5, 2015	1034-218	1.16
204	5	"Football"	Andres Salaff	Lyle Partridge & Luke Pearson	November 6, 2015	1034-207	1.26
205	6	"Stakes Part 1: Marceline the Vampire Queen"	Andres Salaff	Jesse Moynihan & Ako Castuera	November 16, 2015	1034-212	1.87
206	7	"Stakes Part 2: Everything Stays"	Elizabeth Ito	Hanna K. Nyström & Adam Muto	November 16, 2015	1034-213	1.87
207	8	"Stakes Part 3: Vamps About"	Andres Salaff	Tom Herpich & Steve Wolfhard	November 17, 2015	1034-214	1.82
208	9	"Stakes Part 4: The Empress Eyes"	Elizabeth Ito	Somvilay Xayaphone & Seo Kim	November 17, 2015	1034-215	1.82
209	10	"Stakes Part 5: May I Come In?"	Adam Muto	Luke Pearson & Lyle Partridge	November 18, 2015	1034-216	1.85
210	11	"Stakes Part 6: Take Her Back"	Andres Salaff	Jesse Moynihan & Ako Castuera	November 18, 2015	1034-217	1.85
211	12	"Stakes Part 7: Checkmate"	Elizabeth Ito	Jesse Moynihan & Ako Castuera	November 19, 2015	1034-222	1.70
212	13	"Stakes Part 8: The Dark Cloud"	Andres Salaff	Tom Herpich & Steve Wolfhard	November 19, 2015	1034-219	1.70
213 214	14 15	"The More You Moe, the Moe You Know"	Andres Salaff Elizabeth Ito	Tom Herpich & Steve Wolfhard	December 3, 2015	1034-224 1034-228	1.20
215	16	"Summer Showers"	Elizabeth Ito	Graham Falk	January 7, 2016	1034-223	1.10
216	17	"Angel Face"	Elizabeth Ito	Somvilay Xayaphone & Seo Kim	January 11, 2016	1034-210	1.11
217	18	"President Porpoise Is Missing!"	Andres Salaff	Kent Osborne & Sam Alden	January 12, 2016	1034-211	1.21
218	19	"Blank-Eyed Girl"	Andres Salaff	Somvilay Xayaphone & Seo Kim	January 13, 2016	1034-220	1.12
219	20	"Bad Jubies"	Kirsten Lepore^{g}	Kirsten Lepore	January 14, 2016	1034-205	1.22
220	21	"King's Ransom"	Adam Muto	Andres Salaff & Hanna K. Nyström	January 15, 2016	1034-221	1.12
221	22	"Scamps"	Elizabeth Ito	Kent Osborne & Somvilay Xayaphone	January 21, 2016	1034-225	1.45
222	23	"Crossover"	Andres Salaff	Sam Alden & Jesse Moynihan	January 28, 2016	1034-226	1.13
223	24	"The Hall of Egress"	Andres Salaff	Tom Herpich	March 5, 2016	1034-227	1.24
224	25	"Flute Spell"	Andres Salaff	Jesse Moynihan & Sam Alden	March 12, 2016	1034-231	1.01
225	26	"The Thin Yellow Line"	Adam Muto	Lyle Partridge & KC Green	March 19, 2016	1034-233	1.15

=== Season 8 (2016–17) ===
No. overall	No. in season	Title	Supervising direction by	Written and storyboarded by	Original release date (Note: The Islands miniseries was released on DVD and made available for download on iTunes and Amazon.com on January 24. However, because this field specifically refers to episode airdates, the information here will denote when these eight episodes first aired on Cartoon Network.)	Prod. code	US viewers (millions)
226	1	"Broke His Crown"	Elizabeth Ito	Ako Castuera & Hanna K. Nyström	March 26, 2016	1034-234	1.13
227	2	"Don't Look"	Elizabeth Ito	Somvilay Xayaphone & Seo Kim	April 2, 2016	1034-230	1.13
228	3	"Beyond the Grotto"	Andres Salaff (Note: Seven minutes of this episode were animated and directed by Alex & Lindsay Small-Butera.)	Seo Kim & Somvilay Xayaphone	April 9, 2016	1034-235	1.06
229	4	"Lady Rainicorn of the Crystal Dimension"	Elizabeth Ito	Graham Falk	April 16, 2016	1034-232	0.90
230	5	"I Am a Sword"	Andres Salaff	Jesse Moynihan & Sam Alden	April 23, 2016	1034-236	0.91
231	6	"Bun Bun"	Elizabeth Ito	Somvilay Xayaphone & Seo Kim	May 5, 2016	1034-240	1.01
232	7	"Normal Man"	Andres Salaff	Jesse Moynihan & Sam Alden	May 12, 2016	1034-241	1.38
233	8	"Elemental"	Elizabeth Ito	Kent Osborne	May 19, 2016	1034-242	1.17
234	9	"Five Short Tables"	Elizabeth Ito	Aleks Sennwald & Kris Mukai	May 26, 2016	1034-237	1.36
235	10	"The Music Hole"	Andres Salaff	Polly Guo & Andres Salaff	June 23, 2016	1034-239	1.15
236	11	"Daddy-Daughter Card Wars"	Andres Salaff	Steve Wolfhard & Adam Muto	July 7, 2016	1034-238	1.16
237	12	"Preboot" (Part 1)	Adam Muto	Aleks Sennwald & Adam Muto	November 19, 2016	1034-243	0.77
238	13	"Reboot" (Part 2)	Elizabeth Ito	Tom Herpich & Steve Wolfhard	November 19, 2016	1034-244	0.77
239	14	"Two Swords"	Cole Sanchez	Tom Herpich & Steve Wolfhard	January 23, 2017	1042-248	0.88
240	15	"Do No Harm"	Cole Sanchez	Laura Knetzger & Lyle Partridge	January 23, 2017	1042-249	0.88
241	16	"Wheels"	Elizabeth Ito	Graham Falk & Charmaine Verhagen	January 24, 2017	1042-245	0.91
242	17	"High Strangeness"	Elizabeth Ito	Pendleton Ward & Sam Alden	January 25, 2017	1042-246	0.95
243	18	"Horse and Ball"	Cole Sanchez	Somvilay Xayaphone & Seo Kim	January 26, 2017	1042-247	0.76
244	19	"Jelly Beans Have Power"	Cole Sanchez	Aleks Sennwald & Hanna K. Nyström	January 27, 2017	1042-250	0.91
245	20	"Islands Part 1: The Invitation"	Elizabeth Ito	Sam Alden & Polly Guo	January 30, 2017	1042-251	1.20
246	21	"Islands Part 2: Whipple the Happy Dragon"	Elizabeth Ito	Somvilay Xayaphone & Seo Kim	January 30, 2017	1042-252	1.20
247	22	"Islands Part 3: Mysterious Island"	Cole Sanchez	Tom Herpich & Steve Wolfhard	January 31, 2017	1042-253	1.09
248	23	"Islands Part 4: Imaginary Resources"	Elizabeth Ito	Pendleton Ward & Graham Falk	January 31, 2017	1042-254	1.09
249	24	"Islands Part 5: Hide and Seek"	Elizabeth Ito	Aleks Sennwald & Hanna K. Nyström	February 1, 2017	1042-255	1.01
250	25	"Islands Part 6: Min & Marty"	Cole Sanchez	Kent Osborne & Sam Alden	February 1, 2017	1042-256	1.01
251	26	"Islands Part 7: Helpers"	Elizabeth Ito	Tom Herpich & Steve Wolfhard	February 2, 2017	1042-257	1.00
252	27	"Islands Part 8: The Light Cloud"	Cole Sanchez	Graham Falk, Aleks Sennwald, & Adam Muto	February 2, 2017	1042-258	1.00

=== Season 9 (2017) ===
No. overall	No. in season	Title	Supervising direction by	Written and storyboarded by	Original release date (Note: "Orb" was released through the Cartoon Network phone App on April 14, the Elements miniseries was released for download via iTunes on April 18, and "Abstract" through "Three Buckets" were released via the Cartoon Network phone app on July 14. However, because this field specifically refers to episode airdates, the information here will denote when these fourteen episodes first aired on Cartoon Network.)	Prod. code	US viewers (millions)
253	1	"Orb"	Elizabeth Ito	Aleks Sennwald & Adam Muto	April 21, 2017	1042-259	0.71
254	2	"Elements Part 1: Skyhooks"	Cole Sanchez	Sam Alden & Polly Guo	April 24, 2017	1042-260	0.83
255	3	"Elements Part 2: Bespoken For"	Elizabeth Ito	Somvilay Xayaphone & Seo Kim	April 24, 2017	1042-261	0.83
256	4	"Elements Part 3: Winter Light"	Cole Sanchez	Steve Wolfhard & Laura Knetzger	April 25, 2017	1042-262	0.98
257	5	"Elements Part 4: Cloudy"	Elizabeth Ito	Graham Falk & Kent Osborne	April 25, 2017	1042-263	0.98
258	6	"Elements Part 5: Slime Central"	Elizabeth Ito	Aleks Sennwald & Hanna K. Nyström	April 26, 2017	1042-264	0.92
259	7	"Elements Part 6: Happy Warrior"	Cole Sanchez	Sam Alden & Polly Guo	April 26, 2017	1042-265	0.92
260	8	"Elements Part 7: Hero Heart"	Elizabeth Ito	Somvilay Xayaphone & Seo Kim	April 27, 2017	1042-266	0.90
261	9	"Elements Part 8: Skyhooks II"	Cole Sanchez	Steve Wolfhard	April 27, 2017	1042-267	0.90
262	10	"Abstract"	Adam Muto	Graham Falk & Laura Knetzger	July 17, 2017	1042-268	0.77
263	11	"Ketchup"	Elizabeth Ito (Note: Three sequences in this episode were animated and directed by Alex & Lindsay Small-Butera.)	Somvilay Xayaphone & Seo Kim	July 18, 2017	1042-271	0.67
264	12	"Fionna and Cake and Fionna"	Elizabeth Ito	Aleks Sennwald & Hanna K. Nyström	July 19, 2017	1042-269	0.69
265	13	"Whispers"	Cole Sanchez	Sam Alden & Polly Guo	July 20, 2017	1042-270	0.76
266	14	"Three Buckets"	Cole Sanchez	Tom Herpich & Steve Wolfhard	July 21, 2017	1042-272	0.85

=== Season 10 (2017–18) ===
No. overall	No. in season	Title	Supervising direction by	Written and storyboarded by	Original release date (Note: "Seventeen" was released on the Cartoon Network website on December 7, 2017; "Ring of Fire", "Marcy & Hunson", and "The First Investigation" were released via the Cartoon Network phone app on December 8; and "Blenanas", "Jake the Starchild", "Temple of Mars", and "Gumbaldia" were released via the Cartoon Network phone app and VOD on March 9. However, because this field specifically refers to episode airdates, the information here will denote when this episode first aired on Cartoon Network.)	Prod. code	US viewers (millions)
267	1	"The Wild Hunt"	Cole Sanchez	Sam Alden, Polly Guo, & Erik Fountain	September 17, 2017	1054-275	0.77
268	2	"Always BMO Closing"	Diana Lafyatis	Kent Osborne & Graham Falk	September 17, 2017	1054-273	0.77
269	3	"Son of Rap Bear"	Diana Lafyatis	Seo Kim & Somvilay Xayaphone	September 17, 2017	1054-276	0.77
270	4	"Bonnibel Bubblegum"	Diana Lafyatis	Aleks Sennwald & Hanna K. Nyström	September 17, 2017	1054-274	0.77
271	5	"Seventeen"	Cole Sanchez	Seo Kim & Somvilay Xayaphone	December 17, 2017	1054-281	0.76
272	6	"Ring of Fire"	Cole Sanchez	Tom Herpich & Steve Wolfhard	December 17, 2017	1054-277	0.76
273	7	"Marcy & Hunson"	Cole Sanchez	Graham Falk & Adam Muto	December 17, 2017	1054-278	0.76
274	8	"The First Investigation"	Diana Lafyatis	Hanna K. Nyström & Aleks Sennwald	December 17, 2017	1054-279	0.76
275	9	"Blenanas"	Diana Lafyatis	Patrick McHale & Sam Alden	March 18, 2018	1054-280	0.53
276	10	"Jake the Starchild"	Cole Sanchez	Aleks Sennwald & Hanna K. Nyström	March 18, 2018	1054-283	0.53
277	11	"Temple of Mars"	Diana Lafyatis	Steve Wolfhard & Tom Herpich	March 18, 2018	1054-282	0.53
278	12	"Gumbaldia"	Diana Lafyatis	Sam Alden & Graham Falk	March 18, 2018	1054-284	0.53
280 (Note: The special "Diamonds and Lemons", which is not considered a part of this season, aired before the four-part finale. This makes "Diamonds and Lemons" the show's 279th episode and the first part of "Come Along with Me" the show's 280th.)	13	"Come Along with Me"	Cole Sanchez & Diana Lafyatis	Tom Herpich, Steve Wolfhard, Somvilay Xayaphone, Seo Kim, Aleks Sennwald, Hanna K. Nyström, Sam Alden, & Graham Falk	September 3, 2018	1054-285	0.92
281	14	"Come Along with Me"	Cole Sanchez & Diana Lafyatis	Tom Herpich, Steve Wolfhard, Somvilay Xayaphone, Seo Kim, Aleks Sennwald, Hanna K. Nyström, Sam Alden, & Graham Falk	September 3, 2018	1054-286	0.92
282	15	"Come Along with Me"	Cole Sanchez & Diana Lafyatis	Tom Herpich, Steve Wolfhard, Somvilay Xayaphone, Seo Kim, Aleks Sennwald, Hanna K. Nyström, Sam Alden, & Graham Falk	September 3, 2018	1054-287	0.92
283	16	"Come Along with Me"	Cole Sanchez & Diana Lafyatis	Tom Herpich, Steve Wolfhard, Somvilay Xayaphone, Seo Kim, Aleks Sennwald, Hanna K. Nyström, Sam Alden, & Graham Falk	September 3, 2018	1054-288	0.92

== Special ==
=== "Diamonds and Lemons" (2018) ===
On November 17, 2017, it was announced that a bonus episode entitled "Diamonds and Lemons" would be produced by Microsoft's gaming studio Mojang. The episode is based on the sandbox video game Minecraft. According to Adam Muto, "Diamonds and Lemons" was produced separately from the show's final season.

No. overall	Title	Directed by	Written and storyboarded by	Original release date	Prod. code	US viewers (millions)
279	"Diamonds and Lemons"	Adam Muto (supervising); Lindsey Pollard (animation)	Hanna K. Nyström & Anna Syvertsson	July 20, 2018	1054-289	1.02
In a Minecraft version of Ooo, Finn delivers a bucket of water to Jake who is mining for diamonds. After collecting a whole minecart full of them, Jake proceeds to toss them into the lava, upsetting Finn who thinks they should be used for something more useful. Finn takes a diamond to Princess Bubblegum and Marceline, and the former creates a firework with it. Lemongrab meanwhile tries to grow a lemon tree, but is too incompetent, so Bubblegum and Marceline give him bone meal to make it grow faster. Later, Finn asks for an apple pie from Tree Trunks, but she only has one made of pumpkins; she offers it and a pumpkin to him. On his way home, he encounters an Enderman. Lumpy Space Princess scares it away and Ice King tries to "grief" Finn by stealing Finn's pumpkin, but incurs the wrath of the Enderman. The next day, Lemongrab's tree ends up growing apples, angering him, but pleasing Tree Trunks. Finn shows off the firework to Jake which blows a hole in the cave ceiling, but it makes Jake happy anyway.

== Shorts ==
=== "The Wand" (2012) ===
This short was released on the season one DVD.

No.	Title	Written and storyboarded by	Original release date
–	"The Wand"	Tom Herpich	July 10, 2012
Finn and Jake must team up with the Ice King to stop a misbehaving wand.

=== "Graybles Allsorts" (2015) ===
These shorts—referred to as "Graybles Allsorts" by the Adventure Time production staff—were produced during the show's sixth season. They were released on CartoonNetwork.com between July 6 and November 1, 2015. "Sow, Do You Like Them Apples", the penultimate short, was originally intended to be the final one uploaded, but the shorts were eventually released "slightly out of order". The shorts were eventually re-released on the seventh season DVD.

No.	Title	Supervising direction by	Written and storyboarded by	Original release date	Prod. code
1	"All's Well That Rats Swell"	Andres Salaff	Steve Wolfhard	July 6, 2015	1025-204A
BMO discovers a rogue rat in the Tree House's flour and attempts to drive off the creature.
2	"Have You Seen the Muffin Mess?"	Andres Salaff	Steve Wolfhard	August 3, 2015	1025-204B
Jake and Finn assist Princess Bubblegum in attempting to stop a muffin-based plague.
3	"Sow, Do You Like Them Apples?"	Andres Salaff	Geneva Hodgson	October 1, 2015	1025-204D
Ice King and Marceline are hungry for a snack.
4	"The Gift That Reaps Giving"	Andres Salaff	Polly Guo	November 1, 2015	1025-204C
Death (voiced by Miguel Ferrer) tries to make a mixtape for his girlfriend, Life (Hynden Walch).

=== "Frog Seasons" (2016) ===
These were advertised as "Adventure Time shorts" and were produced during the show's seventh season. The first four aired on Cartoon Network between April 2, 2016, and April 23, 2016, and the final short was released exclusively online. Each of these shorts feature Finn and Jake following a crown-carrying frog during a different season of the year. The shorts were eventually re-released on the seventh season DVD.

No.	Title	Supervising direction by	Written and storyboarded by	Original release date	Prod. code
1	"Frog Seasons, Spring"	Elizabeth Ito	Hanna K. Nyström	April 2, 2016	1034-229A
2	"Frog Seasons, Summer"	Elizabeth Ito	Adam Muto	April 9, 2016	1034-229B
3	"Frog Seasons, Autumn"	Elizabeth Ito	Hanna K. Nyström	April 16, 2016	1034-229C
4	"Frog Seasons, Winter"	Elizabeth Ito	Adam Muto	April 23, 2016	1034-229D
5	"Frog Seasons, Spring (Again)"	Elizabeth Ito	Hanna K. Nyström	September 2, 2016	1034-229E

== Home media ==
=== DVD releases ===
Region 1 compilation DVDs
DVD title	Season(s)	Aspect ratio	Episode count	Total running time	Release date(s)
My Two Favorite People (Note: Wal-Mart released a special, two-disc version of this DVD in October of 2012. This release added four new episodes (2 from season one, 1 from season two, and 1 from season four), bringing the run-time up to 176 minutes.)	1, 2	16:9	12	137 minutes	September 27, 2011
It Came From the Nightosphere	1, 2, 3	16:9	16	176 minutes	March 6, 2012
Jake vs. Me-Mow	1, 2, 3, 4	16:9	16	176 minutes	October 2, 2012
Fionna and Cake	2, 3, 4	16:9	16	176 minutes	February 19, 2013
Jake the Dad	4, 5	16:9	16	176 minutes	September 17, 2013
The Suitor	1, 2, 3, 4, 5	16:9	16	176 minutes	May 6, 2014
Princess Day	2, 3, 4, 5, 6	16:9	16	176 minutes	July 29, 2014
Adventure Time and Friends	1, 2, 3, 4	16:9	8	88 minutes	October 7, 2014
Finn the Human	3, 4, 5, 6	16:9	16	176 minutes	November 25, 2014
Frost & Fire	1, 3, 4, 5, 6	16:9	16	176 minutes	March 3, 2015
The Enchiridion	1, 2, 3, 4, 5, 6	16:9	16	176 minutes	October 6, 2015
Stakes	7	16:9	8	88 minutes	January 19, 2016
Card Wars	3, 4, 5, 6, 7, 8	16:9	16	176 minutes	July 12, 2016
Islands	8	16:9	8	88 minutes	January 24, 2017

Region 1 complete season sets
DVD title	Season(s)	Aspect ratio	Episode count	Total running time	Release date(s)
The Complete First Season	1	16:9	26	286 minutes	July 10, 2012
The Complete Second Season	2	16:9	26	286 minutes	June 4, 2013
The Complete Third Season	3	16:9	26	286 minutes	February 25, 2014
The Complete Fourth Season	4	16:9	26	286 minutes	October 7, 2014
The Complete Fifth Season	5	16:9	52	572 minutes	July 14, 2015
The Complete Sixth Season	6	16:9	43	473 minutes	October 11, 2016
The Complete Seventh Season	7	16:9	26	286 minutes	July 18, 2017
The Final Seasons	8–10	16:9	57	627 minutes	September 4, 2018
The Complete Collection	1–10	16:9	283	3113 minutes	April 30, 2019

Region 2 season releases
DVD title	Season(s)	Aspect ratio	Episode count	Total running time	Release date(s)
Season 1: Volume 1	1	16:9	10	109 minutes	October 5, 2011
Season 1: Volume 2	1	16:9	8	88 minutes	October 5, 2011
Season 1: Volume 3	1	16:9	8	88 minutes	October 5, 2011
Season 1	1	16:9	26	286 minutes	December 9, 2013
Season 2 (Note: This DVD is not a complete season two release, as it omits "It Came from the Nightosphere", "Death in Bloom", "Mortal Folly", and "Mortal Recoil".)	2	16:9	22	242 minutes	October 20, 2014
Season 3 (Note: This DVD is not a complete season three release, as it omits "The Creeps", "From Bad to Worse", "No One Can Hear You", "Jake vs. Me-Mow", and "Ghost Princess".)	3	16:9	21	216 minutes	March 7, 2016
The Complete First Season	1	16:9	26	286 minutes	October 21, 2019
The Complete Second Season	2	16:9	26	286 minutes	October 21, 2019
The Complete Third Season	3	16:9	26	286 minutes	October 21, 2019
The Complete Fourth Season	4	16:9	26	286 minutes	October 21, 2019
The Complete Fifth Season	5	16:9	52	572 minutes	November 25, 2019
Complete Seasons 1–5 Collection	1–5	16:9	156	1716 minutes	November 25, 2019

Region 4 season releases
DVD title	Season(s)	Aspect ratio	Episode count	Total running time	Release date(s)
The Complete First Season	1	16:9	26	286 minutes	November 17, 2012
The Complete Second Season	2	16:9	26	286 minutes	September 4, 2013
The Complete Third Season	3	16:9	26	286 minutes	May 5, 2014
The Complete Fourth Season	4	16:9	26	286 minutes	November 12, 2014
The Complete Fifth Season – Part 1	5	16:9	26	286 minutes	September 16, 2015
The Complete Fifth Season – Part 2	5	16:9	26	286 minutes	November 4, 2015
Adventure Time: Seasons 1–5 Boxset	1–5	16:9	156	1716 minutes	November 11, 2015
The Completely Complete Fifth Season	5	16:9	52	572 minutes	May 10, 2016
The Complete Sixth Season	6	16:9	43	473 minutes	November 16, 2016
The Complete Seventh Season	7	16:9	26	286 minutes	November 22, 2017
The Complete Eighth Season	8	16:9	27	297 minutes	November 28, 2018
The Complete Ninth Season	9	16:9	14	154 minutes	December 19, 2018
The Complete Tenth Season	10	16:9	16 (Note: Following the previous season reshuffles, the show's original ninth season was relabeled as its tenth.)	176 minutes	February 20, 2019
The Complete Collection	1–10	16:9	283	3113 minutes	July 22, 2020

=== Blu-ray releases ===
US releases by Warner Home Video – region free
Blu-ray title	Season(s)	Aspect ratio	Episode count	Total running time	Release date(s)
The Complete First Season	1	16:9	26	286 minutes	June 4, 2013
The Complete Second Season	2	16:9	26	286 minutes	June 4, 2013
The Complete Third Season	3	16:9	26	286 minutes	February 25, 2014
The Complete Fourth Season	4	16:9	26	286 minutes	October 7, 2014
The Complete Fifth Season	5	16:9	52	572 minutes	July 14, 2015
The Complete Sixth Season	6	16:9	43	473 minutes	October 11, 2016
The Complete Collection	1–10	16:9	283	3113 minutes	October 20, 2026

Australian releases by Madman Entertainment – region B
Blu-ray title	Season(s)	Aspect ratio	Episode count	Total running time	Release date(s)
The Complete First Season	1	16:9	26	286 minutes	April 9, 2013
The Complete Second Season	2	16:9	26	286 minutes	September 4, 2013
The Complete Third Season	3	16:9	26	286 minutes	May 3, 2014
The Complete Fourth Season	4	16:9	26	286 minutes	November 12, 2014
Adventure Time Seasons 1–4 Boxset	1–4	16:9	104	1144 minutes	November 12, 2014
The Complete Fifth Season – Part 1	5	16:9	26	286 minutes	September 16, 2015
The Complete Fifth Season – Part 2	5	16:9	26	286 minutes	November 4, 2015
The Completely Complete Fifth Season	5	16:9	52	572 minutes	May 10, 2016
The Complete Sixth Season	6	16:9	43	473 minutes	November 16, 2016
The Complete Seventh Season	7	16:9	26	286 minutes	November 22, 2017
The Complete Eighth Season	8	16:9	27	297 minutes	November 28, 2018
The Complete Seasons 1–8	1–8	16:9	252	2772 minutes	November 28, 2018
The Complete Ninth Season	9	16:9	14	154 minutes	December 19, 2018
The Complete Tenth Season	10	16:9	16	176 minutes	February 20, 2019
The Complete Collection (boxset)	1–10	16:9	283	3113 minutes	December 4, 2019
The Complete Collection (fatpack)	1–10	16:9	283	3113 minutes	June 24, 2020

British releases by Manga Entertainment – region B
Blu-ray title	Season(s)	Aspect ratio	Episode count	Total running time	Release date(s)
The Complete First Season	1	16:9	26	286 minutes	October 21, 2019
The Complete Second Season	2	16:9	26	286 minutes	October 21, 2019
The Complete Third Season	3	16:9	26	286 minutes	October 21, 2019
The Complete Fourth Season	4	16:9	26	286 minutes	October 21, 2019
The Complete Fifth Season	5	16:9	52	572 minutes	November 25, 2019
Complete Seasons 1–5 Collection	1–5	16:9	156	1716 minutes	November 25, 2019

== See also ==
- Adventure Time: Distant Lands
- Adventure Time: Fionna and Cake

== Notes ==
Directors

- ^d Director
- ^c Creative director
- ^s Supervising director
- ^g Guest director

Explanatory notes
