= Beautopia (disambiguation) =

Beautopia may refer to:

- Beautopia, a film directed by Katharina Otto-Bernstein
- "Beautopia", an episode of the TV series Adventure Time
- "Beautopia: A Face Odyssey", an album by a club Mask and Wig
