= WWM =

WWM may refer to:

- Walking with Monsters
- What Was Missing
- Where Winds Meet
- World Wide Media
