= Apple Thief =

- Adventure Time episode
- Episode no.: Season 3 Episode 11
- Directed by: Larry Leichliter (Note: Director); Cole Sanchez (Note: Creative director); Nick Jennings (Note: Art director)
- Written by: Tom Herpich; Bert Youn
- Story by: Mark Banker; Kent Osborne; Patrick McHale; Pendleton Ward
- Production code: 1008-067
- Original air date: October 3, 2011
- Running time: 11 minutes

Guest appearance
- Ron Lynch as Mr. Pig

Episode chronology
← Previous "What Was Missing"	Next → "The Creeps"
- Adventure Time season 3

"Apple Thief" is the name of the eleventh episode of the third season of the American animated television series Adventure Time. The episode was written and storyboarded by Tom Herpich and Bert Youn, from a story by Mark Banker, Kent Osborne, Patrick McHale, and series creator Pendleton Ward. It originally aired on Cartoon Network on October 3, 2011 and guest stars Ron Lynch as Mr. Pig.

The series follows the adventures of Finn (voiced by Jeremy Shada), a human boy, and his best friend and adoptive brother Jake (voiced by John DiMaggio), a dog with magical powers to change shape and grow and shrink at will. In this episode, the apples of Tree Trunks (voiced by Polly Lou Livingston) are stolen, Finn and Jake dive into the slums of the Candy Kingdom to find the thief.

== Plot ==
Finn (voiced by Jeremy Shada) and Jake (voiced by John DiMaggio) arrive at the house of Tree Trunks (voiced by Polly Lou Livingston) to discover that all of her apples have been stolen. They resolve to help her track down the thieves, bring them to justice, and return her stolen fruit.

Finn and Jake go to the candy tavern, and after convincing the bartender that they are rogues, are given the location of a gang who trade apples. However, Finn and Jake soon learn that "apples" is street-slang for "diamonds", which this gang is actually trading. The gang catches Finn and Jake, and the two are very nearly eaten by a reluctant pig (voiced by Ron Lynch) that the criminals use to dispose of their enemies, but they manage to escape with Mr. Pig in tow.

Back at Tree Trunks's house, Mr. Pig claims that he can "hear" apples somewhere in the building. After opening up a closet, dozens of apples spill out, causing Tree Trunks to think that she is the thief. Finn, however, soon deduces that a family of magpies stole all her apples and inadvertently stored them in the closet.

== Production ==
"Apple Thief" was written and storyboarded by Tom Herpich and Bert Youn from a story developed by Mark Banker, Patrick McHale, Kent Osborne, and series creator Pendleton Ward. During the production of "Apple Thief", Youn was living in South Korea undergoing mandatory army training with the South Korean military, whereas Herpich was living in Los Angeles. Unlike how Youn and Jesse Moynihan heavily communicated with one another via the Internet when they worked on the previous third-season episode "Hitman", Youn and Herpich mostly kept to themselves, as they each trusted the other to remain faithful to the episode's outline.

One of the lines dialogue in this episode, written by Herpich, features Tree Trunks referring to a character as looking like an army brat. Herpich did not really understand what he meant when he wrote it, but he felt it was inherently funny and "trusted his gut"; Herpich later explained that he was challenging himself to write the weirdest dialogue he could think of, and then to see where the results would lead him. Ward, confused by the line, wanted to cut it, but Herpich argued that it was funny. After a test screening of the line provided a large laugh, Ward agreed to include the line.

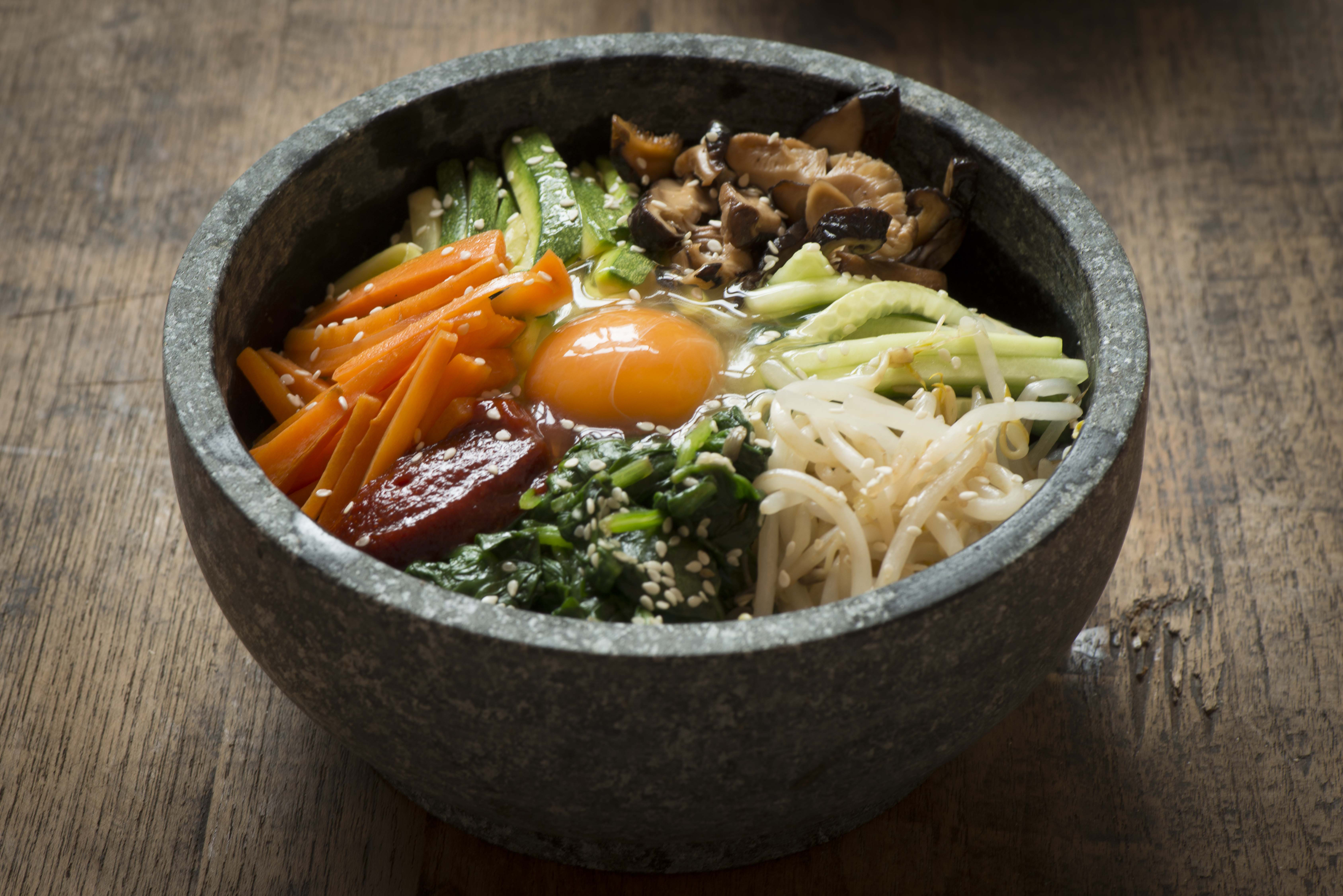
The opening scene of "Apple Thief" features Jake preparing several Korean dishes, such as bibimbap.

The opening scene, which features Jake preparing a number of Korean dishes, was Ward's idea, inspired by Youn's love of cooking Korean cuisine.

Originally, when the animation for the episode was sent back to California, all of the trees in Tree Trunks' orchard had apples on them. These in turn had to be painted out one by one by art director Nick Jennings to maintain consistency with the episode's storyline.

Many of the gang members were brought back as gender-bent versions of themselves in the fifth-season episode "Bad Little Boy". This was because Rebecca Sugar, co-storyboarder for said episode, felt that they fit in with the "rough" nature of Lumpy Space Prince's party.

The voice for the banana guards was inspired by a time Ward imitated John DiMaggio's voice for Jake. Tom Kenny overheard this attempt and, thinking it humorous, parroted it back at Ward. Ward, in turn, enjoyed Kenny's rendition so much that it became the standard voice for the guard. Ron Lynch voiced both the large Gingerbread henchman and Mr. Pig. After the completion of this episode, Ward wanted Mr. Pig to come back because he felt that both the character and Lynch's voice acting were funny. The design for Mr. Pig was settled upon late in the production of the episode. According to Youn, he and Herpich simply each drew a very rudimentary pig design, since neither could easily agree with the other, due to their aforementioned communication issues.

== Reception ==
"Apple Thief" first aired on Cartoon Network on October 3, 2011. The episode was viewed by 2 million viewers and scored a 0.3 Nielsen rating in the 18- to 49-year-old demographic. Nielsen ratings are audience measurement systems that determine the audience size and composition of television programming in the United States, which means that the episode was seen by 0.3 percent of all households aged 18 to 49 years old were watching television at the time of the episode's airing. The episode first saw physical release as part of the complete third season DVD on February 25, 2014. It was later re-released as part of the DVD compilation set, Frost & Fire on March 3, 2015.
