= Too Young (Adventure Time) =

- Adventure Time episode
- Episode no.: Season 3 Episode 5
- Directed by: Larry Leichliter (Note: Director); Cole Sanchez (Note: Creative director); Nick Jennings (Note: Art director)
- Written by: Jesse Moynihan; Tom Herpich
- Story by: Mark Banker; Kent Osborne; Patrick McHale; Pendleton Ward
- Production code: 1008-059
- Original air date: August 8, 2011
- Running time: 11 minutes

Guest appearances
- Justin Roiland as the Earl of Lemongrab; Isabella Acres as Princess Bubblegum (13 year-old version)

Episode chronology
← Previous "Hitman"	Next → "The Monster"
- Adventure Time season 3

"Too Young" is the fifth episode of the third season of the American animated television series Adventure Time. The episode was written and storyboarded by Jesse Moynihan and Tom Herpich, from a story by Mark Banker, Kent Osborne, Patrick McHale, and series creator Pendleton Ward. It originally aired on Cartoon Network on August 8, 2011.

The series follows the adventures of Finn (voiced by Jeremy Shada), a human boy, and his best friend and adoptive brother Jake (voiced by John DiMaggio), a dog with magical powers to change shape and grow and shrink at will. In this episode, the Earl of Lemongrab (voiced by Justin Roiland) finds out that Princess Bubblegum (voiced by Isabella Acres as a young girl, and by Hynden Walch as an adult) has reverted to being only 13 years old and tries to usurp the Candy Kingdom throne. While Finn and Bubblegum initially try to use pranks to coerce him into leaving, Bubblegum eventually makes herself 18 again so she can re-claim the throne.

"Too Young" was the first of three episodes of the series to have been boarded by Moynihan and Herpich. The episode introduced the character of Lemongrab, who would go on to reappear in many other episodes. The episode was watched by 2.089 million people and received largely positive critical reviews. It was later nominated for a Primetime Emmy Award for Outstanding Short-format Animated Program in 2012.

== Plot ==
At the Candy Kingdom, Finn and a young Princess Bubblegum (Note: In the second season finale "Mortal Recoil", Princess Bubblegum is involved in an accident, which results in her "de-aging" and became a 13 year old. At the start of this episode, she is still 13 years old.) (voiced by Isabella Acres) are spending the day together. Now that Bubblegum is his age, he is actively trying to woo her, using advice that he learned from Jake.

Because Bubblegum is now "too young" to be legal ruler of the kingdom, her first creation, the Earl of Lemongrab (voiced by Justin Roiland), usurps the throne. Lemongrab is loud, abrasive, and tyrannical, and threatens to send people to the kingdom's dungeons for the slightest infraction. Bubblegum and Finn decide to prank him until he leaves. This culminates in them poisoning his food with the equivalent of hot sauce; however, he discovers their ruse and sends them both to the dungeon.

In the dungeon, Bubblegum realizes that she needs to return to her 18-year-old self, but she lacks the "candy biomass" necessary to do this. Her loyal citizens then sacrifice pieces of themselves, sticking them to her body. However, a catalyst is required: the heat from a "whopping love hug", which Finn provides. Bubblegum reverts to her original form, fires Lemongrab, and sets the kingdom straight. However, she scorns Finn's advances now that she is older. Jake, via the telephone, comforts Finn, telling him that the key to success is to be persistent and dedicated.

== Production ==
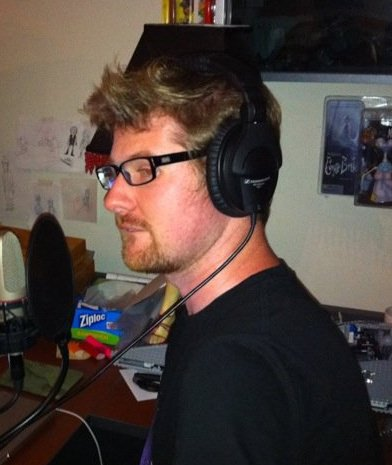
The episode introduced the character Lemongrab, voiced by Justin Roiland.

"Too Young" was written and storyboarded by Tom Herpich and Jesse Moynihan, from a story by Pendleton Ward, Kent Osborne, Patrick McHale, and Mark Banker. The episode was the first that Moynihan and Herpich worked together on. The two had been "comic pen pals" before their time of Adventure Time, and had long wanted to work on an episode together. Cole Sanchez, who was serving as one of the series' creative directors during season three, storyboarded both the short scene featuring Lemongrab being animated by Bubblegum, as well as the ending, featuring Jake detailing how Finn must "go up the wizard steps" to achieve love. In reference to the latter, Sanchez noted that it was "indirect foreshadowing" for what was to come in the show.

The episode marks the introduction of Earl of Lemongrab. According to Moynihan, the character was undefined in the beginning; he and Tom redefined him to make him "stranger and more distinct" so people would remember him as a villain. A rough design for Lemongrab was made by Moynihan; Herpich later added his clothes and sword. The character's original name was "Lemonsour", but this was later changed. The character itself voiced by Justin Roiland. After hearing Roiland's audio, Moynihan noted that it was as if a "dream came true", due in part to Roiland giving the distinct voice to Lemongrab that Moynihan had imagined. Osborne later noted that voicing Lemongrab is taxing, and that when Roiland finishes delivering his lines, he is often covered in sweat. "Too Young" also featured the first use of Lemongrab's catchphrase, "Unacceptable!" Although it was used by Moynihan in the fourth season sequel to this episode, "You Made Me", Herpich has refused to place the line in his storyboards again for fear of overusing it.

Peppermint Butler mentions that food comes from Mars; this was an ad lib on the part of Steve Little, who was instructed to talk randomly only so that he could be interrupted by Roiland. This accidental detail excited Moynihan, who thought that it would be over-analyzed on the Internet. To his disappointment, most fans seemed to ignore the detail.

The idea to have Princess Bubblegum be a 13-year-old girl was first introduced in the second season episode "Mortal Recoil". The younger version of Bubblegum was voiced by Isabella Acres, who had previously played the role in "Mortal Recoil". According to Moynihan, there were initially "rumors" to keep Bubblegum young for several episodes, but eventually her 13-year-old version was relegated to only two appearances before she reverted to normal.

== Reception ==
"Too Young" first aired on Cartoon Network on August 8, 2011. The episode was viewed by 2.089 million viewers and scored a 0.34 Nielsen rating in the 18- to 49-year-old demographic. Nielsen ratings are audience measurement systems that determine the audience size and composition of television programming in the United States, which means that the episode was seen by 0.34 percent of all households aged 18 to 49 years old were watching television at the time of the episode's airing. The episode first saw physical release as part of the 2012 Jake vs. Me-Mow DVD, which included 16 episodes from the series' first four seasons. It was later re-released as part of the complete third season DVD on February 25, 2014.

Ryan Thompson of Watch Play Read awarded the episode a 90%, calling it "the episode that [he has] been looking forward to this season." He concluded that it was a fun episode to watch, but that he wished that the Finn and young-Bubblegum relationship could have been developed over the span of a few more episodes. Tyler Foster of DVD Talk argued that the episode was an example of the season "fleshing out the characters viewers have come to know and love" by elaborating on the relationship between Finn and Bubblegum. Foster praised the introduction of Lemongrab, writing that the episode "reveals a number of weird and sometimes paralyzingly funny quirks about the truly bizarre Earl of Lemongrab". Oliver Sava of The A.V. Club named "Too Young" as one of the ten additional episodes of the series that illustrates that "emotional complexity" lies "beneath Adventure Time's weirdness".

The decision to revert Princess Bubblegum to her original 18-year-old self was met with contention on the Internet, with many fans noting that the decision merely returned the show to its second-season status quo. Ward expressed disregard for these opinions, and the episode's co-storyboarded Tom Herpich stated in the DVD commentary: "We're not out there to give people a hard time. We're out there to make quality entertainment." Herpich and Rebecca Sugar also argued that the point of Bubblegum reverting to 18 was meant to be emphasize the idea of sacrifice, as well as the fact that the Candy Kingdom cannot function without her as ruler.

The episode was later nominated for a 2012 Primetime Emmy Award for Outstanding Short-format Animated Program.
