= Adventure Time season 3 =

Adventure Time
- Season 3
- DVD cover
- Showrunner: Pendleton Ward
- Starring: Jeremy Shada; John DiMaggio; Madeleine Martin; Roz Ryan
- No. of episodes: 26

Release
- Original network: Cartoon Network
- Original release: July 11, 2011 – February 13, 2012

Season chronology
- ← Previous; Season 2 Next → Season 4

The third season of Adventure Time, an American animated television series created by Pendleton Ward, premiered on Cartoon Network on July 11, 2011, and concluded on February 13, 2012. The season follows the adventures of Finn, a human boy, and his best friend and adoptive brother Jake, a dog with magical powers to change shape and size at will. Finn and Jake live in the post-apocalyptic Land of Ooo, where they interact with the other main characters of the show: Princess Bubblegum, The Ice King, Marceline the Vampire Queen, Lumpy Space Princess, and BMO.

This season saw the series grow and progress, featuring the first of the popular Fionna and Cake episodes, as well as marking the first time that fan-submitted content was canonized. Ward also noted that the storyboard artists affected the overall tone of the show, moving it towards more bizarre and spiritual matters.

The first episode of the season, "Conquest of Cuteness" was watched by 2.686 million viewers; this marked an increase in viewers watching Cartoon Network when compared to the previous season's debut. The season ended with the cliffhanger "Incendium", which was resolved at the start of season four. The season was met with largely positive critical reception. In addition, several episodes and writers were nominated for awards; the episode "Thank You" was nominated for an Annie Award as well as an award at the Sundance Film Festival. "Too Young" was nominated for an Emmy Award. Storyboard artist Rebecca Sugar was also nominated for an Annie Award. Several compilation DVDs that contained episodes from the season were released after the season finished airing. The full season set was released on February 25, 2014, on DVD and Blu-ray.

== Development ==
=== Concept ===
The season follows the adventures of Finn the Human, a human boy, and his best friend Jake, a dog with magical powers to change shape and grow and shrink at will. Finn and Jake live in the post-apocalyptic Land of Ooo, wherein they interact with the other major characters, including: Princess Bubblegum, The Ice King, Marceline the Vampire Queen, Lumpy Space Princess, and BMO. Common storylines revolve around: Finn and Jake discovering strange creatures, battling the Ice King, and battling monsters in order to help others. This season expands upon the backstories of Marceline and Ice King, and concludes with Finn attempting to understand his attraction towards Bubblegum and developing a crush on newly introduced Flame Princess.

=== Production ===
After the increasing success of the series, on November 29, 2010 Deadline Hollywood announced that Cartoon Network had renewed the series for a third season. The episode titles were released on April 6, 2011, by Frederator Studios, while the show was nearing the end of its second season. Based on production numbers, "Conquest of Cuteness" was the first episode that underwent production, which was also the first episode aired. In April 2011, the storyboards for season three were nearing completion, and much of the production staff shifted its focus to the show's fourth season.

The ninth episode, entitled "Fionna and Cake" takes place in a gender bent version of Ooo. (Note: Although both TV Guide and fans of the show have referred to the alternate universe as "The Land of Aaa", many writers for the show, including Adam Muto have claimed that the name is non-canon and was never used during the writing or animation process.) The premise of this episode is that the Ice King has created a fan fiction wherein all the main characters of Adventure Time appear in the opposite gender. For instance, Finn the Human has become Fionna the Human, and Jake the Dog is now Cake the Cat. The genesis for the episode were drawings that storyboard artist Natasha Allegri posted onto the internet during her free time. Her creations were eventually canonized by the show's producers. Allegri even re-rerecorded the show's theme—which had originally been sung by series creator Pendleton Ward—for the episode. The episode had a sequel during the fifth season, focusing on Marceline's male counterpart, Marshall Lee, who is voiced by Donald Glover.

Before the third season, Ward cautioned fans that, for legal reasons, he was unable to accept fan creations for characters and stories. However, the sixteenth episode, "Jake vs. Me-Mow" features the titular character Me-Mow, which was drawn by Gunnar Gilmore, aged 14. Gilmore had sketched the character and showed his mother, who forwarded it to Cartoon Network. Ward decided to include the character solely because the character was "so cute". Gilmore's original drawing was used for the episode's title card. So far, this appears to be the only fan-created character that Ward has allowed on the show.

This season's episodes were produced in a process similar to those of the previous seasons. Each episode was outlined in two-to-three pages that contained the necessary plot information. These outlines were then handed to storyboard artists, who created full storyboards. (Note: Information regarding story development and storyboard artists is taken from the opening credits of the season's twenty-six episodes.) Design and coloring were done at Cartoon Network Studios in Burbank, California, and animation was handled overseas in South Korea by Rough Draft Korea and Saerom Animation. Pendleton Ward referred to many of the writers during the third season as "really smart, smartypants people" who were responsible for inserting weirder and more spiritual ideas into the series. He attributed much of this to the background of the writers, many of whom were formerly involved in indie comics.

== Cast ==
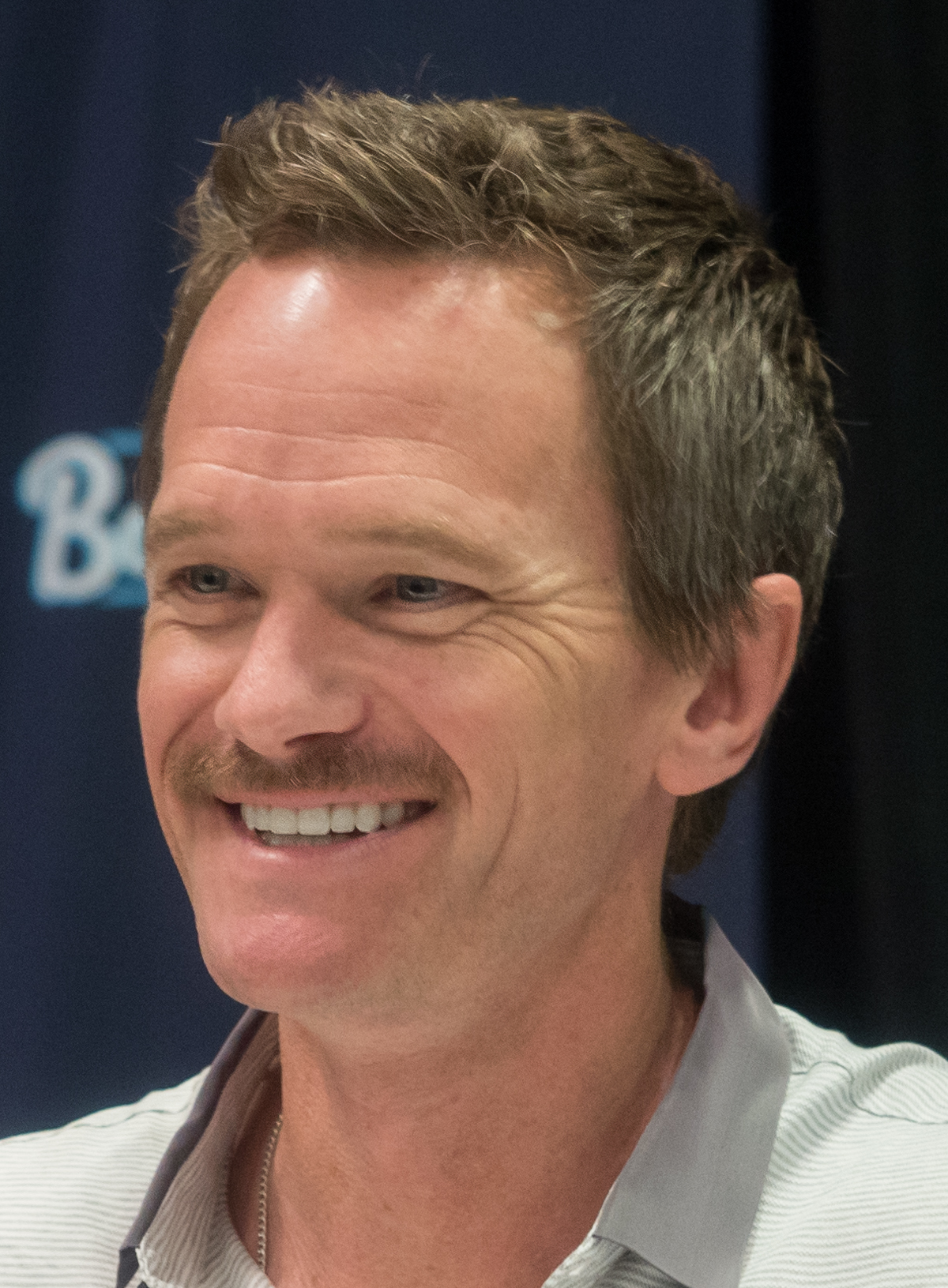
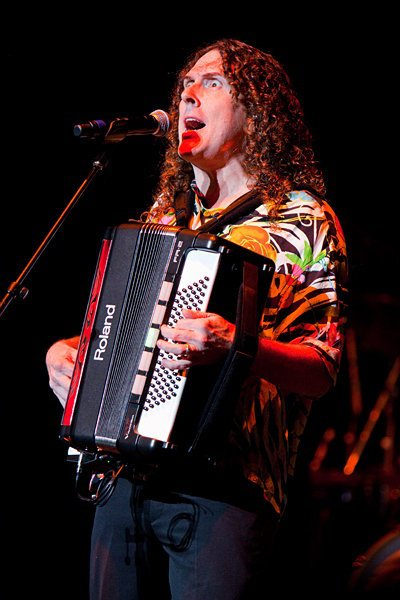
The season featured many guest voices actors, including actor Neil Patrick Harris (left) and musical parodist "Weird Al" Yankovic (right) among others.

The voice actors for the season include: Jeremy Shada (Finn the Human), John DiMaggio (Jake the Dog), Tom Kenny (The Ice King), Hynden Walch (Princess Bubblegum), and Olivia Olson (Marceline the Vampire Queen). Ward himself provides the voice for several minor characters, as well as Lumpy Space Princess. Former storyboard artist Niki Yang voices the sentient video game console BMO, as well as Jake's girlfriend Lady Rainicorn in Korean. Polly Lou Livingston, a friend of Pendleton Ward's mother, Bettie Ward, plays the voice of the small elephant Tree Trunks. Season three would also introduce Flame Princess, voiced by Jessica DiCicco; Flame Princess would go on to have a larger role in the fourth and fifth seasons of the show, as well as become Finn's new romantic interest. The Adventure Time cast records their lines together as opposed to doing it individually. This is to capture more natural sounding dialogue among the characters. Hynden Walch has described these group session as akin to "doing a play reading—a really, really out there play."

The series also regularly employs guest voices for various characters. For instance, Jackie Buscarino appears as the Cute King in "Conquest of Cuteness". Steve Agee voices Ash, Marceline's ex-boyfriend, and Ava Acres as young Marceline in "Memory of a Memory". Isabella Acres reprises her role as a young Princess Bubblegum, and Justin Roiland makes his debut as Lemongrab in the episode "Too Young". Lemongrab would soon becoming a recurring character. Steve Little voices the character Abracadaniel, and Maurice LaMarche appears as the Grand Master Wizard in the episode "Wizard Battle". For the gender-bent episode "Fionna and Cake", Madeleine Martin voiced Fionna, Roz Ryan played the part of Cake the Cat, Grey DeLisle appeared as the Ice Queen, and Neil Patrick Harris voiced Prince Gumball. Rich Fulcher appears as Jaybird and Ron Lynch voices the character Pig in "Apple Thief". Jackie Buscarino reprises her role as Susan Strong in the episode "Beautopia". Kyla Rae Kowalewski voices the character Me-Mow in the episode "Jake vs. Me-Mow". Musical parodist "Weird Al" Yankovic appears as the Banana Man in the episode "The New Frontier"; the character was originally supposed to be voiced by Jonathan Katz before Yankovic was chosen after Katz was unable to. Peter Browngardt voices the eponymous character in "Paper Pete". Gregg Turkington appears as the Talking Shrub in "Another Way". Sam Marin voices Clarence in "Ghost Princess". In the episode "Incendium", Keith David makes his debut as Flame King.

Various other characters are voiced by Tom Kenny, Dee Bradley Baker, Maria Bamford, Little, and Kent Osborne.

== Broadcast and reception ==
=== Ratings ===
The season debuted on July 11, 2011, with the episode "Conquest of Cuteness". The episode was watched by 2.686 million viewers. This marked an increase from the second-season premiere, which had been viewed by 2.001 million viewers, and it marked a drastic increase from the second-season finale, which was watched by only 1.975 million viewers. "Conquest of Cuteness" also marked gains when compared to the same timeslot a year prior; growth in kids and boys aged 6–11, 2–11 and 9–14 ranged between 13 and 40 percent. The season hit a high with its ninth episode, "Fionna and Cake", which was watched by 3.315 million viewers. This made the episode, at the time, the highest-rated entry in the series in its three-season run. The season finale, "Incendium", aired on February 13, 2012, ranked as the number one telecast of the week among boys aged 6–11 on all of television. This season remained at the same timeslot as the first two seasons, Mondays at 8:00 pm.

=== Reviews and accolades ===
Mike LeChevallier of Slant magazine awarded the third season three and a half stars out of four. In his review, LeChevallier wrote that the series "scores relatively high marks for storytelling, artwork, music, voice acting, and realization with its neatly wrapped, 11-minute packages of multicolored awesomeness." He further complimented the show because he felt that "it scarcely appears to be trying too hard to attract attention, yet it does just that". He did note that "the short-form format leaves some emotional substance to be desired", although he noted this was inevitable for a series with such short episodes.

"Fionna and Cake" was particularly successful with the fans of the series; according to Entertainment Examiner, after the episode aired, "fans of the series loved the new interpretation and clamored for more Fionna and Cake". Ward has revealed that he is particularly pleased with the episode "Thank You"; he elaborated, "I think it's awesome that with a show called Adventure Time with Finn and Jake, we can just forget about Finn and Jake for a little bit and the network will just let us follow this creature around".

The series was nominated for two separate Annie Awards: one for Best Animated Special Production for "Thank You", and another for Best Storyboarding in a Television Production for Rebecca Sugar. The series, however, failed to win either. The episode "Too Young" was nominated for a 2012 Primetime Emmy Award for Outstanding Short-format Animated Program, although the episode did not win. The episode "Thank You" was also purposely screened in a movie theatre so that it could qualify for the Academy Award for Best Animated Short Film. Although it made the award's short list, it did not make the final list of ten nominees. "Thank You" was later in the running for the Animated Short Film award at the Sundance Film Festival in early 2013, although it did not win the award.

== Episodes ==
No. overall	No. in season	Title	Directed by	Written and storyboarded by	Original release date	Prod. code	US viewers (millions)
53	1	"Conquest of Cuteness"	Larry Leichliter^{d} Cole Sanchez^{c}	Ako Castuera & Tom Herpich	July 11, 2011	1008-053	2.69
Finn (voiced by Jeremy Shada) and Jake (voiced by John DiMaggio) meet the "evil" Cute King (voiced by Jackie Buscarino) and the Cuties, who want to kill Finn and Jake. When they discover the Cuties have never won a fight, the two decide to fake their deaths in battle out of pity.
54	2	"Morituri Te Salutamus"	Larry Leichliter^{d} Cole Sanchez^{c}	Adam Muto & Rebecca Sugar	July 18, 2011	1008-054	1.78
Finn and Jake become trapped in an arena of gladiator ghosts. Finn gives in to bloodlust, and Jake becomes obsessed with keeping up the morale.
55	3	"Memory of a Memory"	Larry Leichliter^{d} Cole Sanchez^{c}	Ako Castuera & Tom Herpich	July 25, 2011	1008-057	2.26
When Marceline (voiced by Olivia Olson) accidentally traps herself in a sleep spell, Finn and Jake venture into her mind to save her. They soon learn that it was an elaborate trick by Marceline's ex-boyfriend Ash (voiced by Steve Agee) to win her back.
56	4	"Hitman"	Larry Leichliter^{d} Cole Sanchez^{c}	Jesse Moynihan & Bert Youn	August 1, 2011	1008-055	2.27
After being grounded by Finn and Jake, the Ice King (voiced by Tom Kenny) hires a hitman to go after them thinking that he's just going to punch them. When he sees the hitman actually trying to kill Finn and Jake, the Ice King plans to save them.
57	5	"Too Young"	Larry Leichliter^{d} Cole Sanchez^{c}	Tom Herpich & Jesse Moynihan	August 8, 2011	1008-059	2.09
When the Earl of Lemongrab (voiced by Justin Roiland) finds out that Princess Bubblegum (voiced by Isabella Acres as a young girl, and by Hynden Walch as a young adult) has reverted to being only 13 years old, he tries to usurp the Candy Kingdom throne. Finn tries to use pranks to coax him into leaving. Princess Bubblegum eventually makes herself 18 again so she can re-claim the throne.
58	6	"The Monster"	Larry Leichliter^{d} Cole Sanchez^{c}	Kent Osborne & Somvilay Xayaphone	August 15, 2011	1008-056	2.24
On a quest from her parents, Finn and Jake track Lumpy Space Princess (voiced by Pendleton Ward) to a village that is being terrorized by a monster. Finn and Jake learn that the monster is actually Lumpy Space Princess, who has run away from home.
59	7	"Still"	Larry Leichliter^{d} Cole Sanchez^{c}	Kent Osborne & Somvilay Xayaphone	August 22, 2011	1008-060	2.29
The Ice King paralyzes Finn and Jake with a potion and tries to bond with them. Meanwhile, Finn tries to summon an astral beast for help. In the end, the Ice King only manages to freeze himself.
60	8	"Wizard Battle"	Larry Leichliter^{d} Cole Sanchez^{c}	Ako Castuera & Jesse Moynihan	August 29, 2011	1008-061	2.30
The Ice King enters a wizard contest, in which the winning wizard receives a kiss from Princess Bubblegum. When Finn realizes the prize, he and Jake enter and help a wizard named Abracadaniel (voiced by Steve Little) in order to stop Ice King. After winning the contest, the Princess kisses Finn, then slaps him for cheating.
61	9	"Fionna and Cake"	Larry Leichliter^{d} Cole Sanchez^{c}	Adam Muto & Rebecca Sugar	September 5, 2011	1008-058	3.32
The titular Fionna (voiced by Madeleine Martin) and Cake (voiced by Roz Ryan), a human girl and her cat, replace Finn and Jake as they battle the Ice Queen (voiced by Grey DeLisle) to save Prince Gumball (voiced by Neil Patrick Harris) and the Candy Kingdom. In the midst of the Ice Queen's latest plan, Fionna must also reconcile her feelings for Prince Gumball and also come to terms with who she is.
62	10	"What Was Missing"	Larry Leichliter^{d} Cole Sanchez^{c}	Adam Muto & Rebecca Sugar	September 26, 2011	1008-062	2.19
Finn (beatboxing), Jake (playing viola), Princess Bubblegum (playing BMO as an 8-bit instrument) and Marceline (playing bass guitar) form a band in order to get to a Door Lord and recover what the creature had stolen from them.
63	11	"Apple Thief"	Larry Leichliter^{d} Cole Sanchez^{c}	Tom Herpich & Bert Youn	October 3, 2011	1008-067	2.00
When Tree Trunks' apples are stolen, Finn and Jake dive into the slums of the Candy Kingdom to find the thief.
64	12	"The Creeps"	Larry Leichliter^{d} Cole Sanchez^{c}	Ako Castuera & Jesse Moynihan	October 17, 2011	1008-070	2.03
Finn, Jake, Princess Bubblegum, Lumpy Space Princess, BMO (voiced by Niki Yang), and Cinnamon Bun (voiced by Dee Bradley Baker) are invited to a masquerade ball hosted by a mysterious "ghost" who begins murdering the guests one by one.
65	13	"From Bad to Worse"	Larry Leichliter^{d} Cole Sanchez^{c}	Kent Osborne & Somvilay Xayaphone	October 24, 2011	1008-064	2.22
When Princess Bubblegum's zombie formula from "Slumber Party Panic" re-infects the Candy Kingdom due to Cinnamon Bun's carelessness, Finn, Jake, Lady Rainicorn, and Lumpy Space Princess must attempt to create a cure.
66	14	"Beautopia"	Larry Leichliter^{d} Cole Sanchez^{c}	Adam Muto & Rebecca Sugar	November 7, 2011	1008-065	1.92
Susan Strong (voiced by Jackie Buscarino) returns and needs help from Finn and Jake to protect her home from "Lub-Glubs", who are revealed to be demonically possessed pool toys.
67	15	"No One Can Hear You"	Larry Leichliter^{d} Cole Sanchez^{c}	Ako Castuera & Jesse Moynihan	November 14, 2011	1008-066	2.48
After a deer knocks Finn unconscious and breaks his legs, he wakes up six months later to find that the Candy Kingdom has been deserted and that Jake has gone insane from a hit to the head; Jake thinks that everyone is having a surprise birthday party for him. But when Finn hears candy people in the sewers and tries to investigate, Jake stops him because he thinks Finn is going to ruin the surprise.
68	16	"Jake vs. Me-Mow"	Larry Leichliter^{d} Cole Sanchez^{c}	Adam Muto & Rebecca Sugar	November 21, 2011	1008-071	2.26
A small cat and assassin named Me-Mow (voiced by Kyla Rae Kowalewski) blackmails Jake with poison into trying to kill Wildberry Princess (voiced by Maria Bamford) by hiding in his nose.
69	17	"Thank You"	Larry Leichliter^{d} Cole Sanchez^{c}	Tom Herpich	November 23, 2011	1008-063	2.33
When a Firewolf pup (voiced by Dee Bradley Baker) accidentally gets lost in the mountains and is found by the Snow Golem, they strike up a strange friendship as he tries to return it to its family before being melted by its fire-overrun home.
70	18	"The New Frontier"	Larry Leichliter^{d} Cole Sanchez^{c}	Tom Herpich & Bert Youn	November 28, 2011	1008-072	2.39
When Jake has a prophetic "croak dream" that illustrates his death after coming into contact with a mysterious Banana Man (voiced by "Weird Al" Yankovic), Finn tries to make sure that it does not come true. Everything, however, proceeds according to the dream, save for Jake dying.
71 72	19 20	"Holly Jolly Secrets"	Larry Leichliter^{d}	Kent Osborne & Somvilay Xayaphone	December 5, 2011	1008-068 1008-069	2.51
Part 1: Finn and Jake dig up the Ice King's video diaries and attempt to uncover his secrets before the Ice King realizes what they have done. Part 2: The Ice King tries to get the video diaries back. Finn and Jake soon discover, via the tapes, that the Ice King was formerly a human archaeologist who was cursed with his powers after he put his crown on his head.
73	21	"Marceline's Closet"	Larry Leichliter^{d} Adam Muto^{c}	Ako Castuera & Jesse Moynihan	December 12, 2011	1008-073	2.50
Finn and Jake hide from Marceline in her own closet after a game of "cloud hunt" goes awry. The two voyeuristically see everything that happens, but are soon discovered; Marceline, however, shows no ill will, revealing that she spies on the duo all the time.
74	22	"Paper Pete"	Larry Leichliter^{d} Adam Muto^{c}	Kent Osborne & Somvilay Xayaphone	January 16, 2012	1008-075	N/A
While Jake reads up on Rainicorn history, Finn meets the Pagelings and their leader Paper Pete (voiced by Peter Browngardt). Finn soon helps defend the books of the library from the destructive Moldos.
75	23	"Another Way"	Larry Leichliter^{d} Adam Muto^{c}	Tom Herpich & Bert Youn	January 23, 2012	1008-076	N/A
Finn is scared by clown nurses who want to heal his foot, so he seeks out the magical tears of a cyclops.
76	24	"Ghost Princess"	Larry Leichliter^{d} Nate Cash^{c}	Ako Castuera & Jesse Moynihan	January 30, 2012	1008-077	N/A
Finn and Jake try their hand at being detectives in order to discover how Ghost Princess (voiced by Maria Bamford) died so that she can ascend into Ghost World. Ghost Princess eventually falls in love with another ghost named Clarence (voiced by Sam Marin), but it is revealed that during their mortal lives Ghost Princess was accidentally killed by Clarence, who in his grief then exploded from an over-consumption of nacho cheese.
77	25	"Dad's Dungeon"	Larry Leichliter^{d}	Pendleton Ward, Adam Muto, & Natasha Allegri	February 6, 2012	1008-078	2.60
Jake and Finn's deceased dad reveals, via a holographic projector, that he built a dungeon to toughen up Finn. Finn is saddened and offended by his dad's perceived meanness, but beats the challenges, realizing that his father was doing it for Finn's own good.
78	26	"Incendium"	Larry Leichliter^{d} Adam Muto^{c}	Adam Muto & Rebecca Sugar	February 13, 2012	1008-074	N/A
Trying to help a brokenhearted Finn, Jake seeks the Flame King's (voiced by Keith David) consent for Finn to date his daughter, Flame Princess (voiced by Jessica DiCicco).

- ^d Director
- ^c Creative director

== Home media ==
Warner Home Video released multiple DVD volumes, such as It Came from the Nightosphere, Jake vs. Me-Mow, Fionna and Cake, The Suitor, Princess Day, Finn the Human, Frost & Fire, and The Enchiridion which contain episodes from the third season. All DVD releases can be purchased on the Cartoon Network Shop, and the individual episodes can be downloaded from both the iTunes Store and Amazon.com.

=== Full season release ===
The full season set was released on DVD and Blu-ray on February 25, 2014. By March 9, 2014, the DVD release had sold 32,056 copies, and the Blu-ray set had sold 8,577 copies.

Adventure Time: The Complete Third Season
Set details
Special features
- 26 episodes
  - 2-disc set (DVD)
  - 1 disc (Blu-ray)
- 1.78:1 aspect ratio
- Subtitles: English
- English (Dolby Stereo)
- Commentaries on all episodes
  - Featuring Pendleton Ward, Rebecca Sugar, Adam Muto, Tom Herpich, Cole Sanchez, Jesse Moynihan, Somvilay Xayaphone, Bert Youn, and Kent Osborne
- "How an Idea Becomes Adventure Time" featurette
  - Featuring Ward, Muto, and Osborne
- Alternate show introduction made out of Lego bricks
Release dates
Region 1
Region 4
Region A
Region B
February 25, 2014
May 5, 2014 (DVD)
May 3, 2014 (Blu-ray)
February 25, 2014
May 5, 2014 (DVD)
May 3, 2014 (Blu-ray)
