= Time Sandwich =

- Adventure Time episode
- Episode no.: Season 5 Episode 33
- Directed by: Elizabeth Ito (Note: Supervising director); Nick Jennings (Note: Art director)
- Written by: Kent Osborne; Cole Sanchez
- Story by: Kent Osborne; Pendleton Ward; Jack Pendarvis; Adam Muto
- Original air date: September 9, 2013

Episode chronology
← Previous "Earth & Water"	Next → "The Vault"
- Adventure Time season 5

"Time Sandwich" is the thirty-third episode from the fifth season of the American animated television series Adventure Time. Its original air date on Cartoon Network was September 9, 2013. The episode was written by Kent Osborne and Cole Sanchez and directed by Elizabeth Ito, from a story by Osborne, Pendleton Ward, Jack Pendarvis, and Adam Muto. Tom Kenny lent the voice of Magic Man, the episode's antagonist.

The series follows the adventures of Finn (voiced by Jeremy Shada), a human boy, and his best friend and adoptive brother Jake (voiced by John DiMaggio), a dog with magical powers to change shape and grow and shrink at will. In this episode, Finn, Jake, Princess Bubblegum and Marceline the Vampire Queen struggle to retrieve Jake's sandwich that Magic Man steals. Magic Man tells a riddle that would allow them to retrieve it but summons a bubble that decelerates himself in time. Inspiration for the story was found in a popular video of Paula Deen preparing a sandwich in slow motion. Approximately two million viewers saw it on the original air date. Reviews were positive of its visuals and comic aspects, especially following a succession of episodes that were perceived as more serious.

== Plot ==
Jake prepares a sandwich that he has been looking forward to making all day. Just as he finishes it—with Finn and their robot companion BMO in the room—Magic Man appears and steals it. Magic Man offers to return the sandwich if Jake can solve a riddle, but Jake insults the riddle instead, prompting Magic Man to fall backward out of their treehouse. To save himself, Magic Man summons a bubble that drastically decelerates time, slowing his descent.

Finn and Jake partially enter the bubble, where five hours quickly pass in the real world. BMO claims to have figured out the solution for them, but instead tricks Finn and Jake into building a ramp so BMO can look cool skateboarding inside the time-slowed bubble. Finn then calls Princess Bubblegum for help. Bubblegum explains that the bubble uses room-temperature molasses to decelerate time and that a "molasses warmer" can reverse the effect. They detonate the device inside the bubble, but because of the time dilation, it explodes in excruciating slow motion.

Out of ideas, Bubblegum calls Marceline, but she ends up getting trapped in the bubble herself. Driven by desperation, a pouting Jake steps into the bubble and discovers to his surprise that he can move at a normal speed. Jake then realizes that the secret to moving freely within the bubble is feeling deep sadness. He initially thinks of Mr. Cupcake winning the affections of Lady Rainicorn after Jake's death, which only makes him angry. Finn urges him to focus on sorrow instead; Jake imagines Mr. Cupcake mourning his death and the two of them reconciling, which brings him to tears and allows him to reach Magic Man in time. Jake wins back his sandwich, and the bubble finally bursts.

== Production ==
"Time Sandwich" was written by Kent Osborne and Cole Sanchez. As part of a team responsible for sequencing scenes, Osborne and Sanchez adapted the episode from a story previously devised by series creator Pendleton Ward, Jack Pendarvis, Adam Muto, and Osborne. The episode was directed by Elizabeth Ito, her seventh credit for the season. Art direction was handled by Nick Jennings. According to Osborne, the story for "Time Sandwich" was inspired by a widely circulated video of celebrity chef Paula Deen preparing a sandwich. The video, which has been slowed down, grew popular for enhancing the tension and absurdity of her preoccupation with making the sandwich. Osborne argued that the episode has "a crazy story featuring almost all of the regular characters, but the goal is super simple". Sanchez expressed enjoyment at having written the episode, calling it "crazy fun to work on." He specifically praised Osborne's work, arguing that his scenes were consistently hilarious.

The central plot to "Time Sandwich" revolves around the antics of Magic Man. The character was introduced in the first-season episode "Freak City" is his first, and reappeared in the fourth-season episode "Sons of Mars" and the earlier fifth-season episode "All the Little People". Magic Man is voiced by Tom Kenny, who also voices the Ice King on the series.

== Broadcast and reception ==
"Time Sandwich" originally aired on Cartoon Network on September 9, 2013. This airing earned a Nielsen rating of 1.3, in that 1.3 percent of families with a television set watched the episode on that date. The rating represents approximately two million viewers, the network's third most-viewed airing for the second week in September.

"Time Sandwich" earned positive reviews. Oliver Sava, writing for The A.V. Club, gave the episode a B+ grade, remarking that the deceleration of time juxtaposed with the fast pace inherent to the episode. He called the episode funny and described that as a pleasant shift from the preceding episodes, which dealt with poignant themes and characters. Sava praised the illustrations in the episode, especially that of the time bubble. Eric Kohn wrote that the episode was "beguiling" and "cockamamie" for IndieWire Daily. Nicolas Michaud, writing in his book Adventure Time and Philosophy, called the episode metaphysical in its contrasting of science and magic. He regarded Bubblegum's role in the episode as corroborating her as the "staunchest proponent and defender" of the scientific method. TV.com's staff found the comical aspects excellent, as were the visuals. In particular, the staff called BMO riding the skateboard in front of Marceline as the show's best shot. John Moe and Open Mike Eagle, in Conversation Parade: An Adventure Time Podcast, observed that fans held the episode as the best introduction to Adventure Time.

== Citations ==
- Michaud, Nicolas (2015). Adventure Time and Philosophy: The Handbook for Heroes. Popular Culture and Philosophy. Vol. 87. Open Court Publishing Company. ISBN 9780812698589.
- Moe, John; Eagle, Mike (July 22, 2015). "Episode No. 6: Storyboarding and BMO's Multitudes". Conversation Parade: An Adventure Time Podcast. American Public Media. Archived from the original on September 21, 2015.
- Strauss, Neil (October 2, 2014). "The Trippiest Show on Television". Rolling Stone. No. 1219. pp. 44–46. Archived from the original on October 3, 2014.
