= Hitman (Adventure Time) =

- Adventure Time episode
- Episode no.: Season 3 Episode 4
- Directed by: Larry Leichliter (Note: Director); Cole Sanchez (Note: Creative director); Nick Jennings (Note: Art director)
- Written by: Jesse Moynihan; Bert Youn
- Story by: Mark Banker; Kent Osborne; Patrick McHale; Pendleton Ward
- Production code: 1008-055
- Original air date: August 1, 2011
- Running time: 11 minutes

Guest appearance
- Grey DeLisle as Breakfast Princess

Episode chronology
← Previous "Memory of a Memory"	Next → "Too Young"
- Adventure Time season 3

"Hitman" is the name for the fourth episode of the third season of the American animated television series Adventure Time. The episode was written and storyboarded by Jesse Moynihan and Bert Youn, from a story by Mark Banker, Kent Osborne, Patrick McHale, and series creator Pendleton Ward. It originally aired on Cartoon Network on August 1, 2011.

The series follows the adventures of Finn (voiced by Jeremy Shada), a human boy, and his best friend and adoptive brother Jake (voiced by John DiMaggio), a dog with magical powers to change shape and grow and shrink at will. In this episode, the Ice King (voiced by Tom Kenny), after being grounded by Finn and Jake, hires a hitman named Scorcher to go after them, thinking that Scorcher will merely punch them. But when he sees the hitman attempting to kill Finn and Jake, the Ice King plans to save them.

"Hitman" was the first and only episode of the series to have been boarded by Moynihan and Youn. Because the latter was serving in the South Korean military, the two had to work on the episode via the Internet. The episode was watched by 2.273 million people and received largely positive critical reviews, with many calling the episode a highlight of the season.

== Plot ==
The Ice King is grounded for four weeks after Finn and Jake upset one of his schemes to kidnap Breakfast Princess. Angered, the Ice King seeks a "hitman" to punch Finn and Jake; however the hitman that he hires, Scorcher, is an assassin, who tries to murder the duo, first by setting their tree house on fire, and then by trying to asphyxiate them. Both schemes are thwarted by the Ice King, who does not intend for Finn and Jake to die.

Scorcher turns his ire towards the Ice King after realizing that he has been interfering with his work. Subsequently, the Ice King flees to Finn and Jake's house, where he explains the situation. Soon, Scorcher arrives, casting fire at the three. Ice King, realizing that the only way Scorcher will leave them alone is if Finn and Jake die, freezes the two and feigns that he himself killed them. This satisfies the assassin, who then leaves. The Ice King in turn begins defrosting Finn and Jake by sitting on them.

== Production ==
"Hitman" was written and storyboarded by Jesse Moynihan and Bert Youn, from a story by Pendleton Ward, Kent Osborne, Patrick McHale, and Mark Banker. This was the only episode of the series to have been boarded by Youn and Moynihan. Youn had previously storyboarded for the series during its first season, and Moynihan had previously storyboarded with Cole Sanchez during the second season. During the production of "Hitman", Youn was in Korea doing mandatory army training with the South Korean military, whereas Moynihan was in Los Angeles. To compensate for this, the two communicated with each other via the Internet. The episode's previous title had been "Hitcapades", before it was changed to "Hitman".

The opening for the episode features the Breakfast Princesses. Ward drew the young, toast-based version, whereas Sanchez drew the older, eggs and bacon-based iteration. The two could not decide on which one to use, so they eventually put them both in the episode. Moynihan later opined that many of his drawing for this episode were off-model, because he had yet to see any work prints from the previous episodes that he had worked on. While Ward enjoyed the off-model designs that Moynihan drew, Moynihan himself was critical of them and tried to curb his penchant for them in subsequent episodes.

This episode is one of the first to feature the characters browsing the Internet. At the time of its writing, storyboard artist Kent Osborne initially thought that the references to the Internet were jarring and anachronistic, since the series was supposed to take place in a fantasy world.

Voice actress Grey DeLisle appears in this episode as Breakfast Princess. She would later reprise her role in the sixth season episode "Princess Day". Ward himself voices Scorcher, although his only audible line occurs near the end of the episode, when he angrily concedes to Ice King's insistence that Finn and Jake are dead.

== Reception ==
"Hitman" first aired on Cartoon Network on August 1, 2011. The episode was viewed by 2.273 million viewers and scored a 0.3 Nielsen rating in the 18- to 49-year-old demographic. Nielsen ratings are audience measurement systems that determine the audience size and composition of television programming in the United States, which means that the episode was seen by 0.3 percent of all households aged 18 to 49 years old were watching television at the time of the episode's airing. The episode first saw physical release as part of the 2012 It Came from the Nightosphere DVD, which included 16 episodes from the series' first three seasons. It was later re-released as part of the complete third season DVD on February 25, 2014.

Mike Lechevallier of Slant magazine applauded the episode, citing it as one of the highlights of the third season, and wrote that it was, "a great misunderstanding-style storyline". However, he did offer a more critical note regarding the Ice King's motivations, writing, "it becomes problematic to process Ice King's substantial bit of character maturation in deciding to aid his perpetual thwarters in their time of need". In the end, however, he noted that, "this is truly a minor complaint".

A review from Geekadelphia named the installment as among the season's "amazing benchmark episodes", writing that it was one of the entries that illustrated that "the folks behind the show really got their foothold and finally figured out the direction and tone that seemed a bit uneven up until this point." Likewise, C. S. Strowbrige of The Numbers named the episode as one of the highlights of the season.
