= Holly Jolly Secrets =

- Adventure Time episodes
- The Ice King's old VHS tapes reveal his original self and tragic backstory. Patrick McHale developed the idea to tell the episode's story via videotape.
- Episode nos.: Season 3 Episodes 19 & 20
- Directed by: Larry Leichliter (Note: Director); Nick Jennings (Note: Art director)
- Written by: Kent Osborne; Somvilay Xayaphone
- Story by: Mark Banker; Kent Osborne; Patrick McHale; Pendleton Ward
- Production code: 1008-068 1008-069
- Original air date: December 5, 2011
- Running time: 22 minutes

Episode chronology
← Previous "The New Frontier"	Next → "Marceline's Closet"
- Adventure Time season 3

"Holly Jolly Secrets" is the collective name for the nineteenth and twentieth episodes of the third season of the American animated television series Adventure Time. The episodes were written and storyboarded by Kent Osborne and Somvilay Xayaphone, from a story by Mark Banker, Kent Osborne, Patrick McHale, and series creator Pendleton Ward. It originally aired on Cartoon Network on December 5, 2011.

The series follows the adventures of Finn (voiced by Jeremy Shada), a human boy, and his best friend and adoptive brother Jake (voiced by John DiMaggio), a dog with magical powers to change shape and grow and shrink at will. In this episode, Finn and Jake stumble across the Ice King’s (voiced by Tom Kenny) video diary and look to uncover his secrets. The Ice King tries to get the video diaries back, but Finn and Jake discover, via the tapes, that the Ice King was formerly a human archaeologist named Simon Petrikov who was cursed with his powers after he put his crown on his head.

"Holly Jolly Secrets" was based on an earlier, aborted Christmas special that would have involved Finn and Jake watching actual Christmas movies, and providing commentary in a style similar to Mystery Science Theater 3000. These plans were later scrapped, and series writer Patrick McHale developed the idea to explore the Ice King's backstory. The episode was watched by 2.513 million people and received largely positive critical reviews, with the novelist Lev Grossman applauding the exploration of the Ice King's past history.

== Plot ==
Finn and Jake dig up a box of treasure that Jake had found in the landfill and had buried without opening. When they open the box, the two discover a plethora of VHS tapes. Finn recognizes them, noting that he saw Ice King bury them in the dump awhile ago. The two make plans for a secret tape watching; Jake puts up flyers warning people that the only ones allowed to attend are Finn, Jake, and BMO. However, the Ice King, seeing one of the posters, decides he wants to watch them too, unaware that the tapes are his. Meanwhile, Finn and Jake start to watch the tapes and discover that they comprise the Ice King's boring and somewhat disturbing video journals.

After watching several entries, Finn and Jake think there might be a secret code hidden in the tapes. BMO apparently cracks the code, revealing that all the tapes contain an encoded picture of Gunter, the Ice King's penguin. The Ice King, unable to get into Finn and Jake's house, raises an army of snowmen and tries to break in by force. Finn and Jake, realizing what is going on, hide under their bed and keep watching the tapes, hoping to discover a secret about the Ice King. Soon, the tapes cut to an ominous recording of a man who introduces himself as Simon Petrikov. Simon, an antiquarian, explains that he bought a magical crown and, after placing it on his head, began to succumb to the crown's power, losing his sanity and his "princess" Betty. Finn and Jake realize that Simon is the same person as the Ice King, and the two take pity on him, giving the tapes back to him.

== Production ==
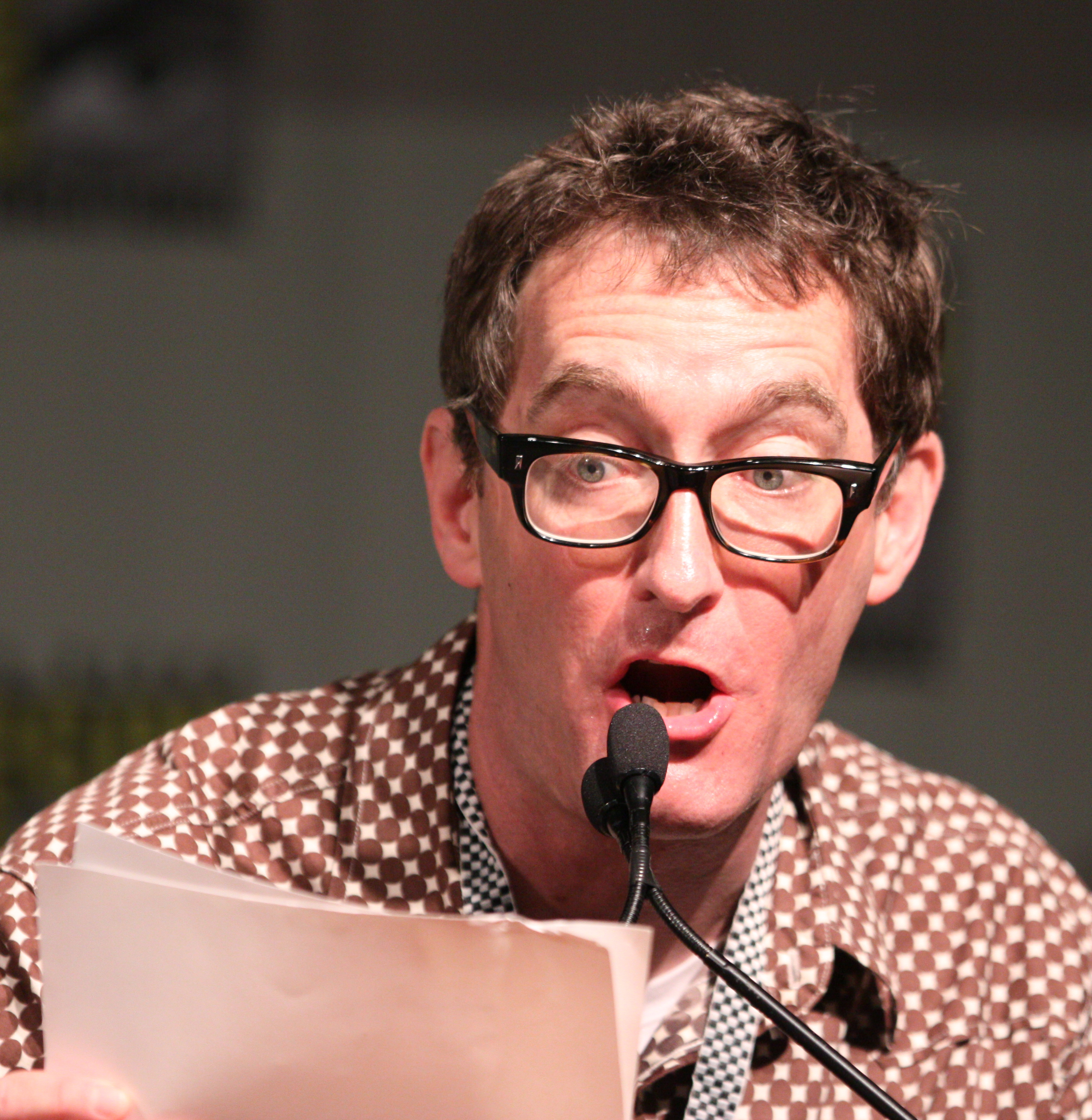
Tom Kenny's voice acting in the episode was likened to dramatic narration from a radio drama by series creator Pendleton Ward.

"Holly Jolly Secrets" was written and storyboarded by Kent Osborne and Somvilay Xayaphone from a story developed by Mark Banker, Patrick McHale, Osborne, and series creator Pendleton Ward. It was directed by Larry Leichliter. The genesis for this episode was Cartoon Network's suggestion that the show create a holiday special. Ward wanted "to do a Christmas episode without doing Christmas", but found that it was too difficult to "just dance around" the holiday. Originally, Ward's idea for the episode was to do it in the style of Mystery Science Theater 3000, featuring Finn and Jake digging up actual Christmas specials, and having them comment on them. This would have entailed a mixing of live-action and traditional animation, but Ward eventually rejected this idea, because the mixing of live action with the animation would have destroyed the world that the cast and crew had spent three seasons creating. To make up for this last-minute change of plans, the writers had to replace the Christmas programs that Finn and Jake would watch with "the Ice King's odd home movies". McHale then crafted the story involving Simon Petrikov, a move that Ward heralded as "brilliant". When it came time for Tom Kenny to record his lines, Ward explained that it "felt like such an authentic, old-time radio horror drama".

Adam Muto storyboarded a video that Finn and Jake fast-forward; because this video contains actual dialogue that can be understood if the viewer slows down the episode, the crew noted that the scene in question required three times the work in order for the fast-forward joke to work. During one of the scenes in which the Ice King is bemoaning his situation via video tape, Osborne placed a faux bumper that read "You're watching an Adventure Time Christmas special! Ho ho ho!", with the joke being that the cheeriness of the bumper undercut the extreme sadness of the Ice King. Many people on the Internet, however, though that the bumper was real.

The episode makes use of "The Fry Song", written by Rebecca Sugar, that had originally appeared in the second season premiere, "It Came from the Nightosphere". Kenny had recorded this version of the song after "It Came from the Nightosphere" aired just for fun, but the crew liked it so much that it eventually made its way into the second part of "Holly Jolly Secrets". The score for the episode was composed by Tim Kiefer. One particular song, titled "Old Cold Footage", that Kiefer composed was supposed to accompany the scene featuring the Ice King's video diary. This track, however, was excised from the episode and "never [saw] the light of day" until Kiefer posted it onto his official website. He later uploaded it onto his official SoundCloud account as well.

== Reception ==
"Holly Jolly Secrets" parts one and two first aired on Cartoon Network on December 5, 2011. The episodes were viewed by 2.513 million viewers and scored a 0.5 Nielsen rating in the 18- to 49-year-old demographic. Nielsen ratings are audience measurement systems that determine the audience size and composition of television programming in the United States, which means that the episode was seen by 0.5 percent of all households aged 18 to 49 years old were watching television at the time of the episodes' airing. The episode first saw physical release as part of the complete third season DVD on February 25, 2014.

Erik Adams of The A.V. Club noted that Finn and Jake finding the Ice King's home tapes led to a "disturbingly intimate holiday special." He later jokingly noted that "Penguin Dance Parties [are] what Christmas is all about, Charlie Brown." Novelist Lev Grossman, in an interview with NPR praised the backstory of the Ice King and the exploration of his condition, noting that his origin is "psychologically plausible". Grossman praised the way the series was able to tackle the issues of mental illness, saying: "It's very affecting. My dad has been going through having Alzheimer's, and he's forgotten so much about who he used to be. And I look at him and think this cartoon is about my father dying."
