= What Was Missing =

- Adventure Time episode
- Episode no.: Season 3 Episode 10
- Directed by: Larry Leichliter (director); Cole Sanchez (creative director); Nick Jennings (art director)
- Written by: Adam Muto; Rebecca Sugar
- Story by: Mark Banker; Kent Osborne; Patrick McHale; Pendleton Ward
- Production code: 1008-062
- Original air date: September 26, 2011
- Running time: 11 minutes

Episode chronology
← Previous "Fionna and Cake"	Next → "Apple Thief"
- Adventure Time season 3

"What Was Missing" is the tenth episode of the third season of the American animated television series Adventure Time. The episode was written and storyboarded by Adam Muto and Rebecca Sugar, from a story by Mark Banker, Kent Osborne, Patrick McHale, and series creator Pendleton Ward. It originally aired on Cartoon Network on September 26, 2011.

The series follows the adventures of Finn (voiced by Jeremy Shada), a human boy, and his best friend and adoptive brother Jake (voiced by John DiMaggio), a dog with magical powers to change shape and grow and shrink at will. In this episode, Finn, Jake, Princess Bubblegum, and Marceline the Vampire Queen form a band in order to defeat the Door Lord and recover what the creature had stolen from them.

Sugar noted that while the episode may appear to be about friendship, it is really about the power of telling the truth, as exemplified by the episode's songs. Episode composer Tim Kiefer played all of the conventional instruments himself, and used unique instruments, like a Game Boy, to make some of the loops heard in the episode. The episode was watched by 2.185 million people and caused a controversy due to the suggestion of an intimate (and possibly romantic) history between Marceline and Bubblegum, a fact that also garnered praise for the episode from several LGBTQ-oriented review sites.

== Plot ==
Jake and BMO decide to give Finn some "alone time" with him and his piece of Bubblegum's hair, which he acquired in the second season episode "To Cut a Woman's Hair". However, a Door Lord suddenly materializes and snatches the lock, along with Jake's beloved blanket, and BMO's controller. Finn and Jake chase through the creature's various doors, stumbling upon Princess Bubblegum and Marceline, who both appear to be victims of the Door Lord's theft. Finally, the Door Lord jumps through a door that the group is unable to get past. They realize that they must sing a song to pass through the door; the group decides to create a band. Jake gets his viola, and Marceline retrieves her bass. Princess Bubblegum decides to play BMO as an 8-bit instrument, and Finn beat-boxes.

Tensions amongst the band members, however, boil over. Marceline sings a song ("I'm Just Your Problem") lamenting her and Bubblegum's estranged relationship, which almost opens the door, due to it being a song based on truth. Marceline and Bubblegum begin arguing, and Jake joins in; the band disbands. Finn, dismayed at his friends' behavior, sings "My Best Friends in the World", bemoaning the fact that his friends are fighting. Bubblegum, Marceline, and Jake all come back to join him, reforming the band, and the four are able to open the door. Inside, Finn, Jake, and BMO reacquire their belongings. The group also finds a black rock T-shirt which they mistake to be Marceline's. However, it is revealed that it is Bubblegum's; it was a gift given to her by Marceline in the past. Finally the group turn to Marceline, asking what she had lost. When they realise she only wanted to spend time with the friends, Marceline feels embarrassed and chases Finn, Jake, BMO and Bubblegum from the Door Lord's abode.

== Production ==
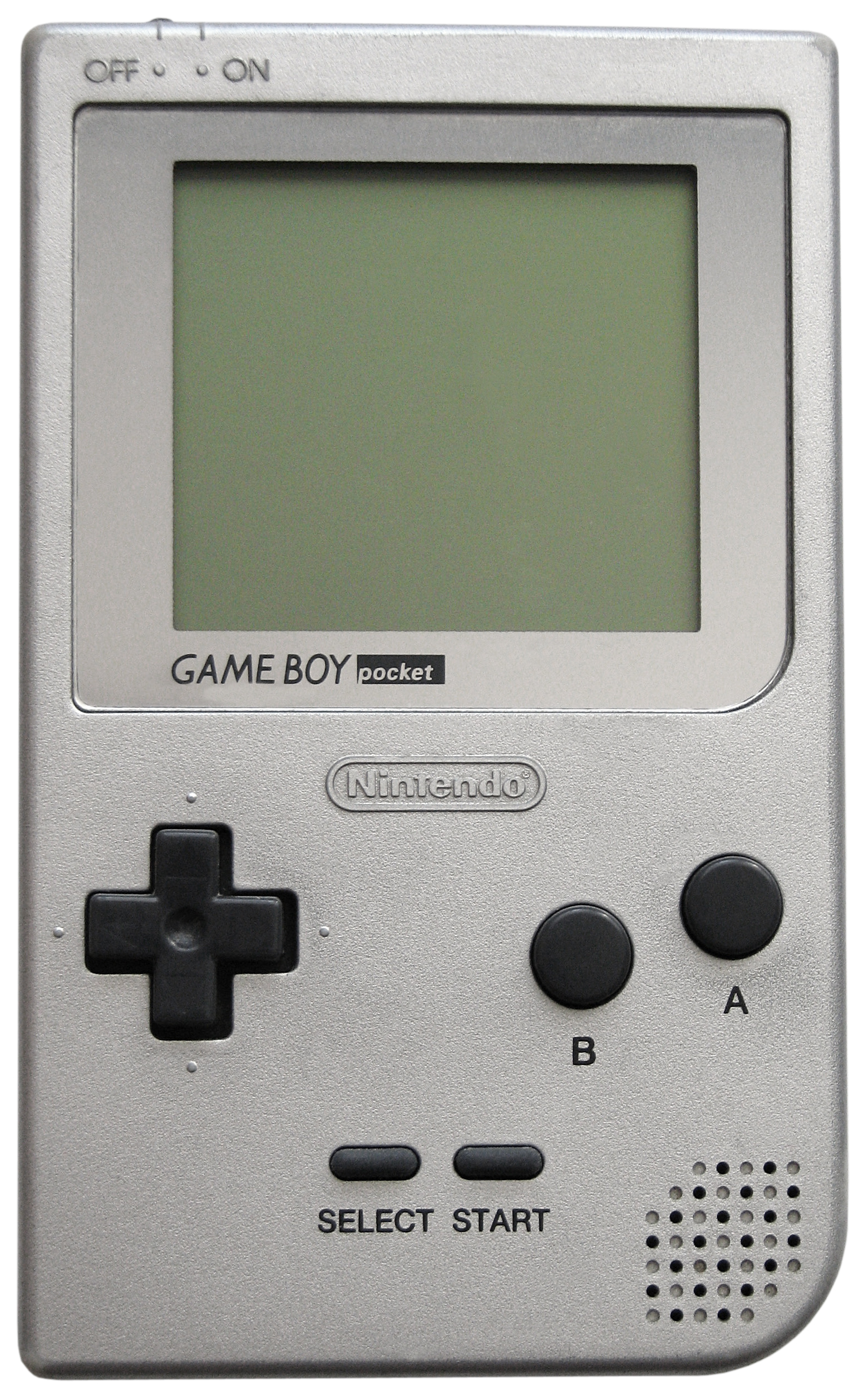
Episode composer Tim Kiefer used a Game Boy to make some of the percussion loops heard in the episode.

"What Was Missing" was written and storyboarded by Rebecca Sugar and Adam Muto from a story developed by Mark Banker, Patrick McHale, Osborne, and series creator Pendleton Ward. The episode was directed by Larry Leichliter, with Cole Sanchez serving as creative director and Nick Jennings serving as art director. The original title for the episode was "Door Jam", but this was later changed because, according to Muto, the show tries to avoid pun-based titles.

"What Was Missing" was Sugar and Muto's second episode dealing with Marceline (the first being "It Came from the Nightosphere" from season two), and because of this, Sugar "wanted to get it right". Sugar later explained on her Tumblr that, "It might seem like this episode is about friendship, but I wanted it to be about honesty! Marceline almost gets the door open because she drops her guard and tells the truth for a second while she sings this song." She later likened the theme of the episode to a quote by Bob Fosse—“The time to sing is when your emotional level is too high to just speak anymore"—noting that she "really wanted to try for that feeling." When looking over the episode’s plot prior to it being storyboarding, Sugar noticed that the interactions between Marceline and Princess Bubblegum recalled the animosity shared between two exes. She consequently pitched to Adam Muto and Pendleton Ward the idea that the two had been in a relationship, but had since broken up. The production crew of the series approved of this story approach, but due to restrictions at Cartoon Network, the writers were unable to explicitly confirm this information in the episode.

All of the songs featured in the episode were initially composed by Sugar, who released her demo version of "I'm Just Your Problem" on her official Tumblr page. Her father, Rob, later released the demos for both "I'm Just Your Problem" and "My Best Friends in the World" on YouTube. "I'm Just Your Problem" was actually the last song written for the episode; Sugar was down to the last minute, and as such, she argued that her emotionally exhausted state informed her songwriting. The song was inspired by an incident that Sugar had experienced with a former roommate. Although the two often fought, Sugar desperately wanted them to be friends despite not particularly liking her. Sugar transferred this situation onto Marceline, writing the song so that Marceline—while having issues with Princess Bubblegum—wanted to become her friend. "My Best Friends in the World" was written by Sugar as a celebration of the friendship she shared with her coworkers, especially her storyboarding partner, Muto. Ward later admitted on the commentary track for "What Was Missing" that, while he was editing the animatic for the episode, he started to cry because the songs featured in the episode were so full of emotion. Adventure Time composer, Tim Kiefer, played the instruments featured in the episode himself. To complement the tones of the bass and viola, he created percussion sounds with Game Boy loops, and then used an autochord for "Princess Bubblegum's melodies" to make "pretty, melodic swoops to accompany BMO's rigid, robotic patterns, loops, and structures."

== Reception ==
"What Was Missing" first aired on Cartoon Network on September 26, 2011. The episode was viewed by 2.185 million viewers and scored a 0.4 Nielsen rating in the 18–49-year-old demographic. This means it was seen by 0.4 percent of all households aged 18 to 49 years old were watching television at the time of the episode's airing.

Tyler Foster of DVD Talk called the episode a "highlight" of the Fionna & Cake DVD. Specifically, he praised the song "I'm Just Your Problem", calling it both a "fan favorite" and "significant as the moment I decided I was a fan". Dana Piccoli of AfterEllen.com enjoyed the way the episode "alluded to perhaps, more than platonic feelings between" Princess Bubblegum and Marceline, as well as the fact that "What Was Missing" was underlined by potential lesbian "subtext". The A.V. Club named the episode one of the ten additional installments of the series that illustrates that "emotional complexity" lies "beneath Adventure Time's weirdness".

=== Controversy ===
"What Was Missing" became controversial because of an allegedly implied past relationship between Marceline and Princess Bubblegum. The controversy largely began after an accompanying "Mathematical" recap—a behind the scenes video series produced by Frederator Studios, one of the show's production companies, that implied that there were lesbian relations between Princess Bubblegum and Marceline and that the writing staff actively seeks input from fans. This incident was addressed by Fred Seibert, the show's executive producer, who said that "in trying to get the show’s audience involved we got wrapped up by both fan conjecture and spicy fanart and went a little too far." Soon after, the video recap and the entire channel was pulled off of YouTube, although "What Was Missing" still airs during reruns. Seibert's decision to remove the video also proved controversial; Bitch magazine later wrote an article about how the episode "handled female desire—female queer desire at that—in a subtle but complex way", and that the removal of the recap and the studio's perceived treatment of the controversy was detrimental towards the acceptance of queer romance in children's television. Ward later addressed the issue and gave a more neutral view, saying that, because there were "so many extreme positions taken on it all over the Internet", he did not "really want to comment on it [because] it was a big hullaballoo."

In August 2014, Marceline's voice actress Olivia Olson told a crowd of fans gathered at a Barnes & Noble book signing from The Adventure Time Encyclopedia, that, according to Ward, Marceline and Princess Bubblegum had dated in the past, but that because the series airs in areas that discourage homosexual relationships, the show has not been able to officially clarify the relationship in the series itself. In the finale of Adventure Time, "Come Along with Me"—which aired on September 3, 2018—the relationship was officially confirmed when Marceline and Princess Bubblegum shared a kiss.

== Media release ==
The episode was first physically released as part of the 2013 Fionna & Cake DVD, which included 16 episodes from the series' second, third, and fourth seasons. It was later re-released as part of the complete third season DVD in February 2014. In addition, the 2015 limited edition 12" vinyl record release Marceline the Vampire Queen – Rock the Nightosphere included "I'm Just Your Problem" alongside other songs sung by Marceline.

== See also ==
- "Come Along with Me"
- "Obsidian"
