= Another Way (Adventure Time) =

- Adventure Time episode
- Title Card
- Episode no.: Season 3 Episode 23
- Directed by: Larry Leichliter (Note: Director); Adam Muto (Note: Creative director); Nick Jennings (Note: Art director)
- Written by: Tom Herpich; Bert Youn
- Story by: Patrick McHale; Kent Osborne; Pendleton Ward; Mark Banker
- Production code: 1008-076
- Original air date: January 23, 2012
- Running time: 11 minutes

Guest appearance
- Gregg Turkington as Talking Bush

Episode chronology
← Previous "Paper Pete"	Next → "Ghost Princess"
- Adventure Time season 3

"Another Way" is the twenty-third episode of the third season of the American animated television series Adventure Time. The episode was written and storyboarded by Tom Herpich and Bert Youn, from a story by Mark Banker, Patrick McHale, Kent Osborne, and Pendleton Ward. It originally aired on Cartoon Network on January 23, 2012. The episode guest stars Gregg Turkington as a talking bush.

The series follows the adventures of Finn (voiced by Jeremy Shada), a human boy, and his best friend and adoptive brother Jake (voiced by John DiMaggio), a dog with magical powers to change shape and grow and shrink at will. In this episode, Finn is scared by clown nurses who want to heal his foot, so he seeks out the magical tears of a cyclops. Along the way, he realizes that sometimes in life, one must make compromises so as to avoid hurting others.

Ward had had the idea for "Another Way" since the first season, but had been unable to successfully break it in the writers room until the third season. During the episode's climax, Herpich attempted to storyboard the scene in order to convey maximum symbolism and thus get the point of the episode across to viewers. The episode has been met with both applause and criticism, with much attention being directed at the emphasis that feet receive in this episode.

== Plot ==
After Finn and Jake break their toes during a stunt that involved jumping off of birds, as shown in the title card, the duo is taken care of by several horrifying clown nurses who insist on kissing their feet. Finn, disgusted by their antics, decides to trek to the forest and find fabled cyclops tears, which will heal any wound. Along the way, he meets resistance from many of the forest's denizens, who all insist that Finn follow their directions. After being told time and time again to proceed in a manner that is contrary to his wishes, Finn turns violent and accidentally injures a small creature named Rainy.

Only then does Finn realize that his selfishness has brought pain to others. He rests on a hill and sings the song "Melons", which documents his errors. Finn's singing, however, awakens the cyclops, and Finn is able to subdue him and take his tears. Finn heals his toes and then runs throughout the forest, restoring life to those that he hurt. But Jake still insists on having his foot kissed, and tells Finn that we all have "our own ways".

== Production ==
"Another Way" was written and storyboarded by Tom Herpich and Bert Youn, from a story developed by Mark Banker, Patrick McHale, Kent Osborne, and series creator Pendleton Ward. This was also the last episode storyboarded by Herpich and Youn. Ward had had the idea for the episode since the first season, but had been unable to successfully break it in the writers room until the third season. Youn, known for his penchant for drawing grotesque and exaggerated faces, designed the main clown nurse. The sequence during which Finn hallucinates that the head nurse's floating head is consuming him was toned down from its original form. Originally, the clown's face was shaded, and made heavy use of under lighting. The entire scene was inspired by Pink Elephants on Parade, a scene from the Disney animated feature film Dumbo in which Dumbo and Timothy Q. Mouse accidentally become intoxicated.

The scene featuring the watermelons rolling down the hill was Herpich's attempt at pushing himself artistically, although he was slightly disappointed that it took "three solid days to board" but took only "half a second on the screen." The joke concerning Rainy being run over by watermelons was inspired by a humorous video that Herpich saw in his youth. The episode guest stars Gregg Turkington, who is best known for his stand-up character Neil Hamburger; he played the talking bush. Maria Bamford voiced both the lead clown and the talking stump. Osborne voiced the character Pan, whose name originally was Brainstorm. Melissa Villaseñor voiced Rainy, Pan's wife.

== Symbolism ==
In the episode, while Finn is singing his song about the melons, the camera focuses on the landscape before him, which features a river diverging into three branches. The middle path goes over a waterfall and lands on jagged rocks. The two on either side, however, "go down a gentle slope". Herpich explains in the DVD commentary for the episode that the middle path represents the path that Finn took, as it is dangerous and deadly. Despite the apparent differences in the river branches, all three merge in the end, symbolizing that, despite the myriad ways of accomplishing something, a person can perform a task in many different ways "and end up in the same spot".

== Reception ==
"Another Way" first aired on Cartoon Network on January 23, 2012. The episode first saw physical release as part of the 2012 Jake vs. Me-Mow DVD, which included 16 episodes from the series' first four seasons. It was later re-released as part of the complete third season DVD on February 25, 2014.

Dean Childers of TV Geek Army interpreted the emphasis placed on the clowns and the feet kissing in a Freudian light, arguing that “this week's story focuses on Finn's response to sexual exploration. They use the clowns as the metaphor. Finn finds sexuality scary and escapes into an adventure to avoid dealing with his feelings of anxiety.” In addition, he argued that the series took the trope that “anything featuring clowns now is obligated to make them as freaky as possible” and “multiplie[d] it tenfold”.

Tyler Foster of DVD Talk called the episode "both wonderfully creative and funny once Finn storms off with his own agenda, but is one of the most bizarre and disturbing episodes of the show I've seen for the first five to ten minutes" due to its heavy use of clowns. A review from Nerdmelt Showroom noted that, "if you don’t like seeing clowns or injured trees, take a pass on this episode." Doug Walker, star of the comedy webseries Nostalgia Critic, reviewed the episode as part of the That Guy with the Glasses web series. He noted that "it feels kind of like a return to form to the first season." Jori Laws, an assistant on That Guy with the Glasses, expressed her disgust at the plot point involving the clowns kissing Finn and Jake's feet. Herpich himself also noted that he had a friend who was disturbed by the feet kissing in the episode.
