= Cole Sanchez =

American artist and voice actor

- Occupations: Storyboard artist, writer, producer, director, voice actor
- Years active: 2008–present
- Known for: Adventure Time; Summer Camp Island; The Marvelous Misadventures of Flapjack

Cole Sanchez is an American storyboard artist, writer, producer, director, and voice actor. He is best known for being a writer, storyboard artist, director, and occasional voice actor on the animated television series Adventure Time (2010–18). Sanchez first rose to prominence when he became a storyboard artist of the Cartoon Network series The Marvelous Misadventures of Flapjack (2008–10). Sanchez also worked as a supervising director on Long Live the Royals (2015) and as a supervising producer on the series Summer Camp Island (2018–23).

== Career ==
Cole Sanchez graduated from CalArts in 2009, whereupon he secured employment as a member of the art crew for the Cartoon Network series The Marvelous Misadventures of Flapjack. When the series was cancelled, Sanchez became a storyboard artist on Adventure Time. At different points, Sanchez would also serve as one of Adventure Time's creative directors and one of its supervising directors.

Sanchez's work on Adventure Time gained him a Primetime Emmy Award nomination for the fifth season episode "Simon & Marcy" in 2013, along with his then-storyboarding partner Rebecca Sugar.

== Filmography ==
=== Television ===
Year	Title	Role
2008–2010	The Marvelous Misadventures of Flapjack	Writer, storyboard artist, storyboard revisionist
2010–2015, 2017–18	Adventure Time	Writer, storyboard artist, creative director (seasons 2 & 3), supervising director (season 6, 8 & 9), voice actor
2014	Over the Garden Wall	Story, writer, storyboard artist, voice actor ('Jason Funderburker')
2015	Long Live the Royals	Writer, supervising director, storyboard artist
2016	Clarence	Additional voice actor
2017–2019	OK K.O.! Let's Be Heroes	Voice actor ('Colewort')
2018–2023	Summer Camp Island	Supervising producer, writer and voice actor ('Freddie', 'Ghost Cole' and 'Salt Parasite')
2019	Infinity Train	Writer, storyboard artist
