= Normalman (disambiguation) =

normalman is a limited series of American comic books.

Normalman or Normal Man may refer to:

- Normalman (TV series), Italian radio and television series
- “Normal Man”, episode of animated television series Adventure Time
- Normal Man, a character whom Magic Man turned into in the animated series Adventure Time

== See also ==
- Normal People
