= MotoGP 3 (disambiguation) =

MotoGP 3 may refer to:

- MotoGP 3 (2003 video game), a 2003 video game published by Namco
- MotoGP 3: Ultimate Racing Technology, a 2005 video game published by THQ
- Moto3 (250cc) Grand Prix motorcycle racing series using 0.25L engines

== See also ==
- MotoGP (disambiguation)
