= French Grand Prix (disambiguation) =

The French Grand Prix is a Formula One motor race.

French Grand Prix may also refer to:

- French Grand Prix contains links to articles for the annual race in each year
- French motorcycle Grand Prix

== See also ==
- Grand Prix of France (disambiguation)
- Grand Prix (disambiguation)
