= Grand Prix of France =

Grand Prix of France may mean:

- French Grand Prix (cars)
- French motorcycle Grand Prix
- Grand Prix de France (figure skating)

== See also ==
- French Grand Prix (disambiguation)
- Grand Prix (disambiguation)
