= List of Adventure Time characters =

The main and recurring cast of Adventure Time, drawn by former lead character designer Andy Ristaino; listed here from left to right: Top Row: Lumpy Space Princess, Lady Rainicorn, Gunter (the penguin) Second Row from Top: Marceline, Ice King, Princess Bubblegum, Lemongrab Third Row from Top: Flame Princess, Finn the Human, BMO and the Snail, Peppermint Butler Bottom Row: Jake the Dog, Tree Trunks.

The American animated television franchise Adventure Time features a cast of fictional characters created by Pendleton Ward. The first series in the franchise, Adventure Time revolves around the adventures of protagonists Finn the Human (voiced by Jeremy Shada), a teenage human boy, and his best friend Jake the Dog (voiced by John DiMaggio), a dog with magical powers to change shape and grow and shrink at will. Finn and Jake live in the post-apocalyptic Land of Ooo, where they travel on various adventures. Along the way, they interact with the other main characters of the show: Princess Bubblegum (voiced by Hynden Walch), the Ice King, Simon Petrikov (voiced by Tom Kenny), and Marceline the Vampire Queen (voiced by Olivia Olson). The second series Distant Lands, follow these characters along with the Peppermint Butler "Pep" (voiced by Steve Little), while Fionna and Cake follows Fionna Campbell (voiced by Madeleine Martin), Cake the Cat (voiced by Roz Ryan), Prismo the Wishmaster (voiced by Sean Rohani), Gary Prince (voiced by Andrew Rannells), Marshall Lee (voiced by Donald Glover), and the Scarab (voiced by Kayleigh McKee), along with a returning Kenny as Simon Petrikov.

This list only includes the main characters of the show, as well as major recurring characters (otherwise known as supporting characters) who are featured across several episodes of the series. Characters which are credited as guest stars or one-off characters are not included.

== Main characters ==
Finn the Human and Jake the Dog

=== Finn the Human ===
Finn the Human (voiced by Jeremy Shada in the TV series and Zack Shada in the original pilot short) is a human boy who loves nothing more than going on adventures and saving the day. He wears a hat that covers his extremely long flowing yellow hair and his ears. He is prone to exclamations and outbursts such as "Mathematical!" and "Algebraic!" When Finn was a baby, he was abandoned and subsequently adopted by Jake's parents, Joshua and Margaret, as detailed in "Memories of Boom Boom Mountain". Considering himself a hero, Finn has a lust for adventure and swore long ago that he would help anyone in need, but being so full of energy, he has trouble in situations that require him to do tasks other than fighting. After initially having an unrequited crush on Princess Bubblegum, Finn began a relationship with Flame Princess that lasted until the events of "Frost & Fire". In "Billy's Bucket List", it is revealed that Finn's birth father, Martin, is alive, and is trapped in a dimension known as the Citadel, which is a prison for the most dangerous criminals in the Multiverse. The actions of Finn and Jake, along with those of the Lich, cause Martin to be released; Finn soon learns that he is a petty criminal, and in the ensuing chaos, Finn loses his right arm, but later regains it in "Breezy" only to lose it again in "Reboot" before being fitted with a mechanical arm which can transform into many different weapons. The grass sword curse later re-manifests itself in the sixth-season finale, "The Comet", wherein Finn also learns that his spirit is the same as the catalyst comet.

=== Jake the Dog ===
Jake the Dog (voiced by John DiMaggio) is Finn's best friend and adoptive brother. He is a 28-year-old—in "magical dog years"—anthropomorphic shapeshifting bulldog. The episode "Joshua & Margaret Investigations" reveals that when Joshua and Margaret—Finn and Jake's parents—were on an investigation, Joshua was bitten by a shape-shifting, other-worldly entity. Joshua, infected by the creature's venom, subsequently birthed Jake from his head. Jake's magic powers allow him to stretch or shrink any part of his body to any shape and size, ranging from becoming gigantic to becoming incredibly small. His powers help Finn considerably in combat and transportation, but are also sometimes used as nothing more than jovial forms of expression. Acting as a confidant and mentor to his energetic brother, Jake has a laid-back attitude in most situations, but loves adventure and will eagerly fight when he needs to do so. Jake is in a relationship with Lady Rainicorn, and they have five children together as seen in the episode "Jake the Dad". The two were drawn to each other due to their shared interest in playing the viola.

Jake dies some time after the show's finale, "Come Along with Me", and, as shown in Adventure Time: Distant Lands and Adventure Time: Fionna and Cake, is immortalized by Finn via a tattoo on his chest.

=== Princess Bubblegum ===
Princess Bubblegum (voiced by Hynden Walch in the TV series and Paige Moss in the original pilot short) is a bubblegum humanoid, comparable to the inhabitants of the Candy Kingdom which she rules. The official series website has described her as "a millionaire nerd enthusiast [who] immerses herself in every branch of geekdom". She and Finn have a complex relationship. For the longest time Finn had a crush on Bubblegum, and although she cares for him a great deal, she did not return his feelings for him. In the episode "What was Missing", it is implied that she and Marceline may have had some sort of relationship in the past. This later caused an online controversy over her and Marceline's sexual orientation. In the second-season finale "Mortal Recoil", after being possessed by The Lich, she was accidentally shattered and returned to life as a 13-year-old due to the doctors' not having enough gum to rebuild her to her proper age, though it appears that her memories have remained intact. In the episode "Too Young", she becomes 18 again by absorbing the parts sacrificed by her candy subjects in order to reclaim her kingdom from the Earl of Lemongrab. After her brush with death, she has begun to feel more and more vulnerable. As a result, she created the clone-Sphinx named Goliad to serve as her heir lest she die on the throne. During the fifth and sixth seasons, it was gradually revealed that Bubblegum had an elaborate spy network, allowing her to monitor nearly everyone in Ooo. After growing increasingly darker and more devious, Bubblegum's Machiavellian actions were finally confronted by Flame Princess in "The Cooler", and since then, Bubblegum has made a concerted effort to relax her need to control everything. In the two-part sixth-season finale, Bubblegum is peacefully deposed after the candy citizens vote to replace her with the King of Ooo (voiced by Andy Daly). Rather than fight her rival, Bubblegum willingly goes into exile with Peppermint Butler until returning to the Candy Kingdom in the aftermath of the Stakes miniseries.

=== Simon Petrikov / The Ice King ===
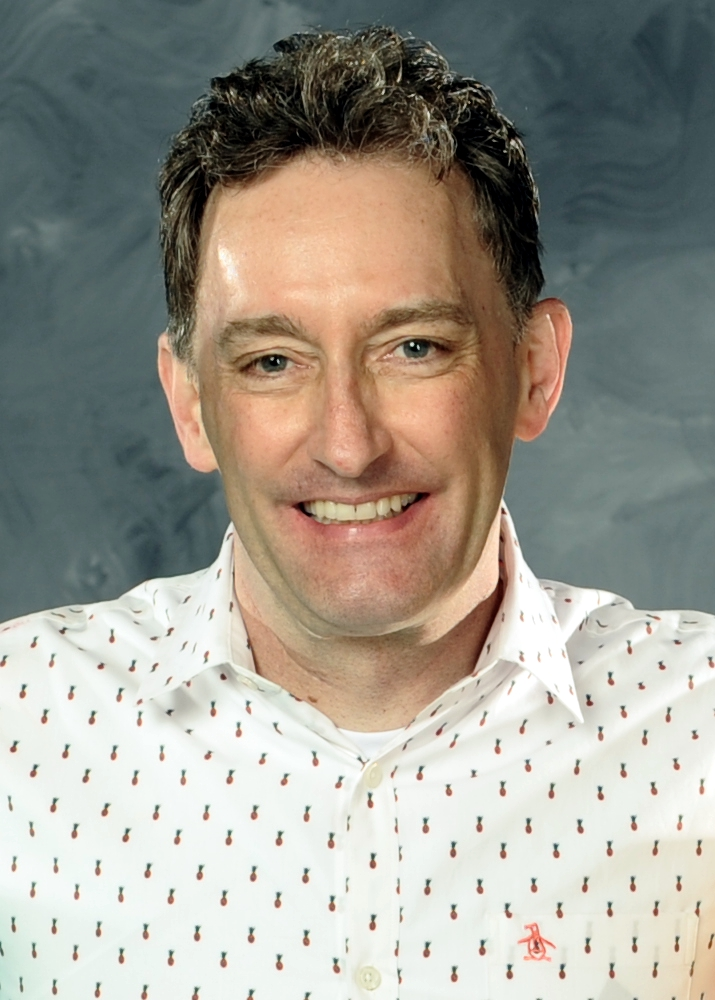
Veteran voice actor Tom Kenny provides the voice for Ice King.

The Ice King (voiced by Tom Kenny in the TV series and John Kassir in the original pilot short) is a recurring antagonist-turned-supporting protagonist of the series, and is 1,043 years old. The Ice King frequently steals princesses throughout the Land of Ooo to forcefully marry them, Princess Bubblegum being his usual target. His ice-based magic abilities come from a magical crown he wears, which directly causes his insanity. The sixth season episode "Evergreen" reveals that the crown was created millions of years prior to the start of the series by an ice elemental named Evergreen in order to stop a comet from destroying all life on the planet. Though Ice King is defined as completely crazy by many, he is actually lonely and misunderstood. Furthermore, he is secretly envious of Finn and Jake for being such good friends.

Finn and Jake learned during the events of "Holly Jolly Secrets" that the Ice King was originally a human antiquarian named Simon Petrikov who bought his crown from a dock worker in northern Scandinavia, predating the Mushroom War. Wearing the crown, Petrikov began to lose both his mind and then his fiancée Betty; this explains his subconscious need for princesses. He soon began deteriorating in both mind and body over the years into his current state. Sometime before the Mushroom War he also discovered the Enchiridion. 996 years prior to the events of the series and directly after the Mushroom War, he met, befriended and cared for young Marceline. Eventually, he realized that his deteriorating mind and behavior would possibly become a threat to young Marceline. Thus, he wrote a letter to Marceline, describing why he could not help her anymore and imploring her to forgive him for whatever wrong he might do with the crown possessing him.

On being returned to his original form, Simon is the only character from Adventure Time to return in a main role in Adventure Time: Fionna and Cake.

=== Marceline the Vampire Queen ===
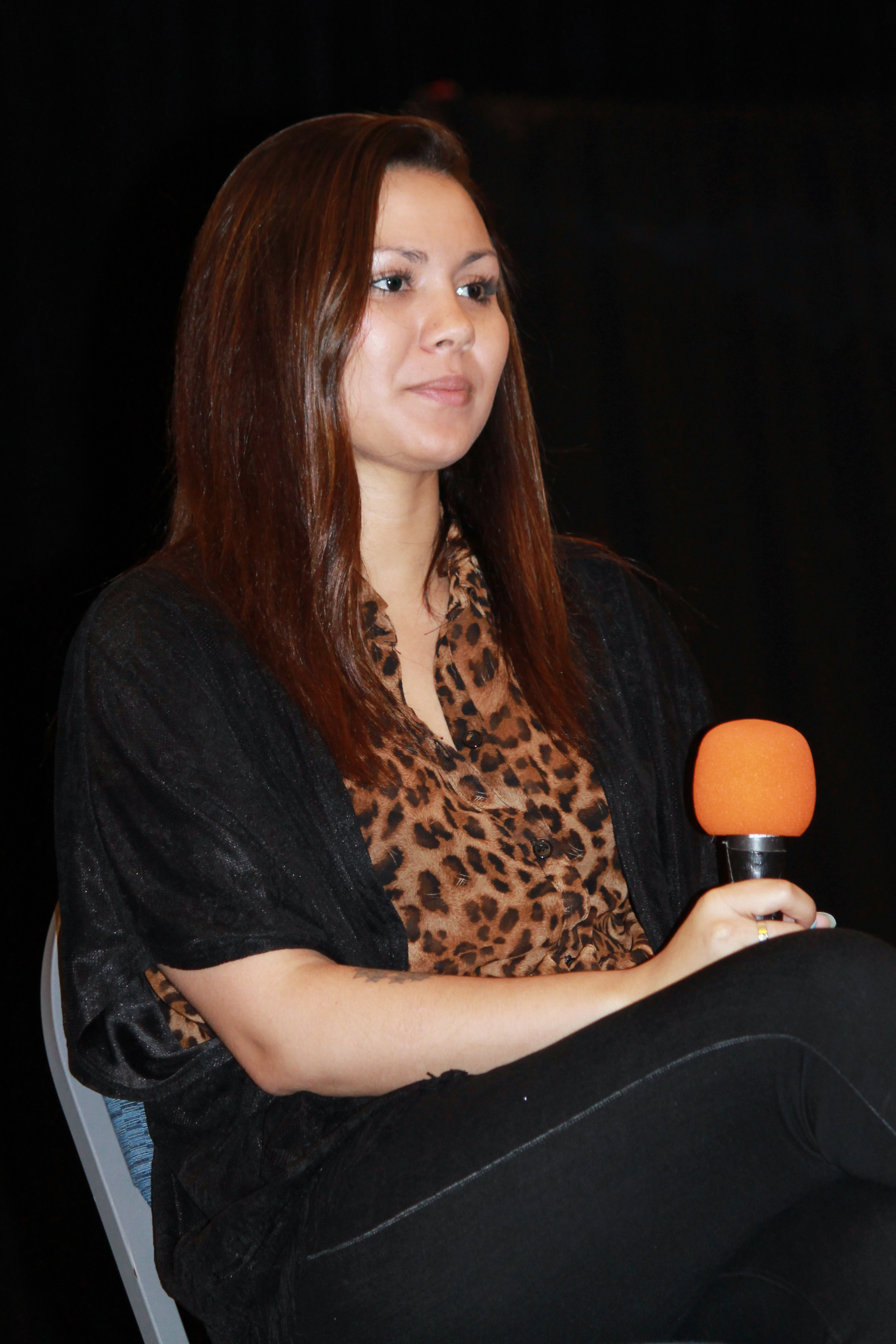
Marceline is voiced by Olivia Olson.

Marceline the Vampire Queen (voiced by Olivia Olson) is a half-human and half-demon vampire, and the eponymous Vampire Queen, after having killed the previous Vampire King, as seen in Stakes. Although she is over a thousand years old, she appears in the form of a young adult. She is usually shown playing her axe bass, which was formerly her family's heirloom battle axe. Marceline and her father, Hunson Abadeer, have trouble accepting one another. Initially, Marceline feels that her father does not care for her and expresses her feelings through music. Furthermore, Abadeer constantly pressures Marceline to follow in the family business and take over ruling the Nightosphere, a prospective job Marceline does not want. Marceline and the Ice King also have a complicated relationship. In the episode "I Remember You", it is revealed that the Ice King—then, the human man named Simon Petrikov—befriended Marceline during the aftermath of the Mushroom War.

=== BMO ===
BMO (voiced by Niki Yang) is a small robot and video game console who lives with Finn and Jake. Their name is a shortening of the phrase "Be More", and it is sometimes written phonetically as "Beemo". Despite being voiced by a woman, BMO has no definite gender, and characters (including BMO) refer to BMO in a variety of ways throughout the show, including using both male and female pronouns, as well as terms such as "m'lady" or "little living boy". BMO has the features of other household objects, such as a portable electrical outlet, music player, camera, alarm clock, flashlight, strobe light, and video player. Despite being an object used for recreation by Finn and Jake, BMO is still considered a close friend and treated as an equal by the two. BMO speaks English with a Korean accent. In the episode "Five Short Graybles", it was revealed that BMO secretly emulates a discussion between a mirrored version of themself, which BMO names "Football", and pretends to be human while teaching Football human habits by attempting to imitate activities such as brushing teeth and using the toilet. BMO was created by Moseph "Moe" Mastro Giovanni, an inventor of machines who created the entire MO-series line, a thousand years before the events of the series. Giovanni specifically designed BMO to understand fun and thus help him raise his own son. However, because he never had children, Giovanni released BMO to find another family.

=== Fionna Campbell and Cake the Cat ===
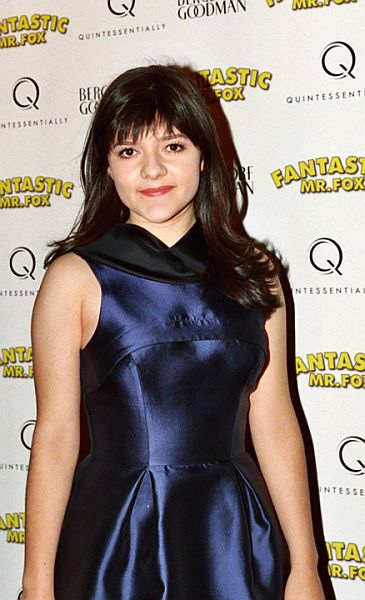
Fionna is portrayed by Madeleine Martin.

Fionna Campbell (voiced by Madeleine Martin) is a human girl and the gender-swapped version of Finn Mertens. Cake (voiced by Roz Ryan) is Fionna's cat and Jake's gender-swapped equivalent. They were initially thought to have been conceived by the Ice King in a bizarre effort to become friends with Finn, but were later revealed to have been created by Prismo and inserted into the Ice King's mind out of a desire to create a universe of his own. Fionna for the most part takes after Finn in every aspect, from the way she dresses to having a cat named Cake who functions in the exact same way as Jake the Dog. Fionna and Cake simply existed as fictional characters within the Land of Ooo and managed to make the Ice King a famous author for "creating" the characters. Following the Ice King's reversion back to the human Simon Petrikov, Fionna's milieu transformed into a boring, realistic city where she was a single, cat-owning, troubled young woman who was constantly going from job to job while desiring to have a more exciting life. She and Cake are pulled out of their world, unintentionally, by Simon where they learn the truth about their existence and set out to help Simon regain his Ice King powers and restore their world to "normalcy".

== Secondary characters ==
=== Lumpy Space Princess ===
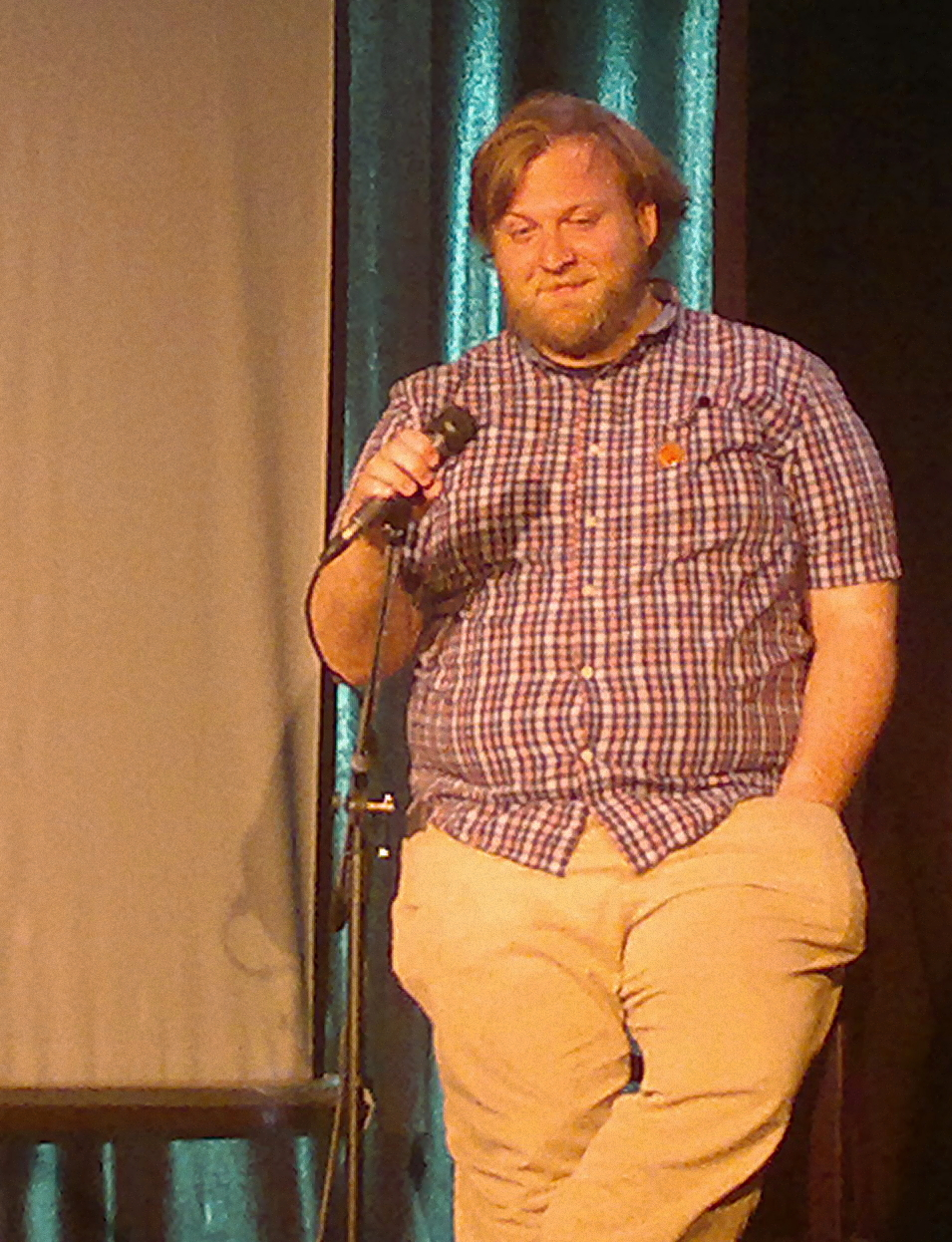
Series creator Pendleton Ward voices Lumpy Space Princess.

Lumpy Space Princess (voiced by Pendleton Ward), often abbreviated as LSP, is the princess of Lumpy Space, an alternate dimension. As a "Lumper", made out of "irradiated stardust", she can convert other beings into Lumpers by biting them. LSP is spoiled, sarcastic, and a narcissist, and is often shown living outdoors with salvaged furniture and appears to be homeless, because she has run away from her parents, who are the king and queen of Lumpy Space. She speaks with a thick valley girl accent. LSP's relationship to Finn and Jake has always come off as nonchalant, but in the episode "Gotcha", LSP realizes that Finn is a person of good moral standing who teaches her that beauty comes from the inside, and in her premiere episode, she reveals to Finn that he's supposed to be her real friend, not like the "fake" ones she has in Lumpy Space.

=== Flame Princess ===
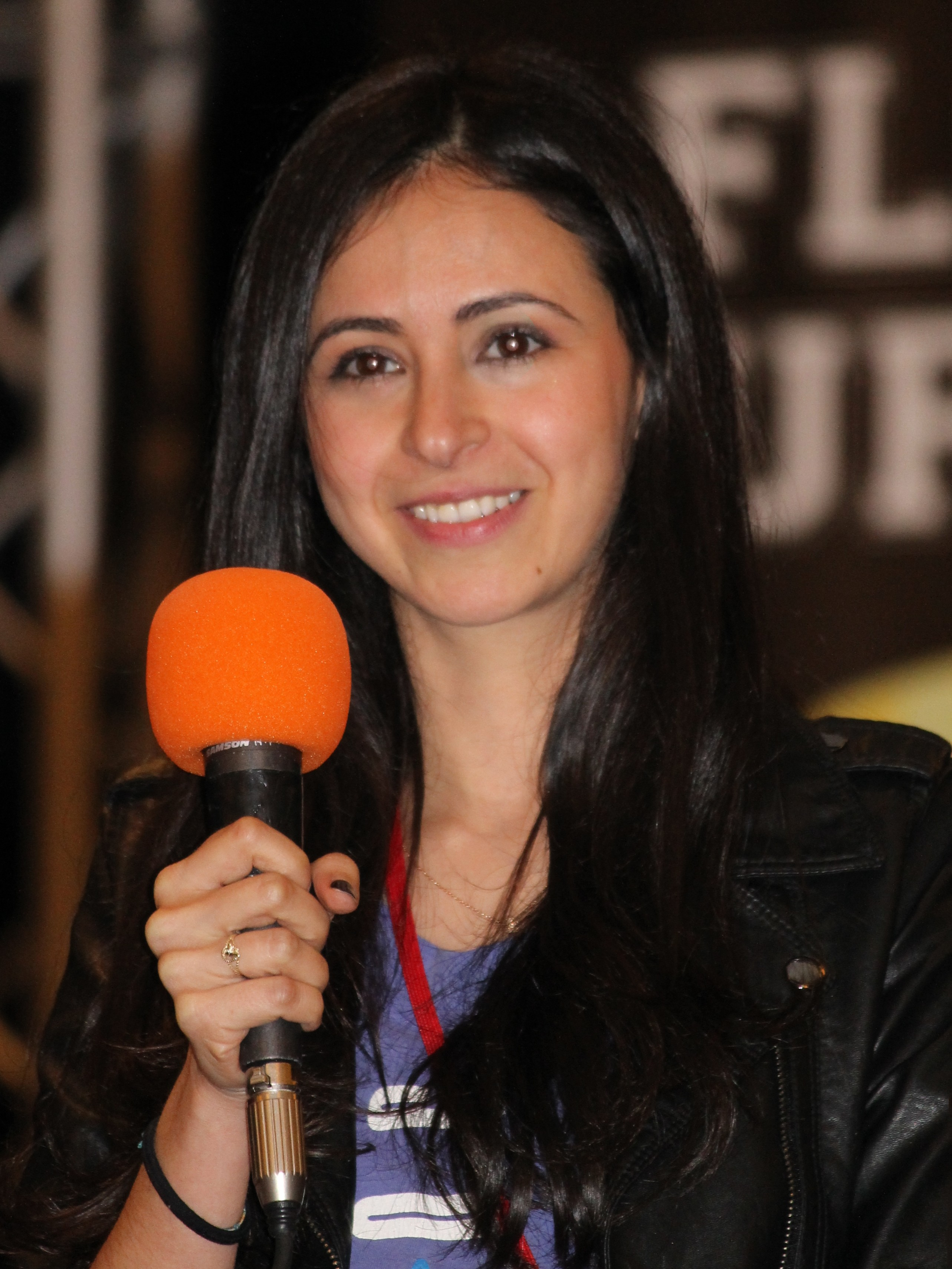
Flame Princess is portrayed by Jessica DiCicco.

Flame Princess (voiced by Jessica DiCicco), whose first name is Phoebe, is the 16-year-old princess of the Fire Kingdom, the daughter of the Flame King, and is one of Finn's friends. Like all other inhabitants of the Fire Kingdom, she is covered with fire, the very flames emitted from her body being extensions of herself that intensify when she becomes emotionally excited. While she was initially referred to as being destructive by her own father, she has a more naïve nature that prompts her to act on her emotions. Finn describes her as "passionate". When she was a toddler, her father attempted to exile her to Ooo out of fear that she would one day usurp the throne, but when Princess Bubblegum returned her, he locked her up instead. In the episode "Ignition Point" after asking Finn to retrieve candles from the Fire Kingdom, she inadvertently expressed her dislike of her father; this largely stems from her imprisonment. Eventually, Flame Princess begins to question herself, and doubts whether or not she is in fact evil. Finn is insistent that she is not evil and takes her on a journey into a dungeon to help her sort out her thoughts. Flame Princess comes to the conclusion that, while she is a lover of destruction, she only enjoys destroying bad guys. Flame Princess and Finn began a relationship sometime before the events of "Burning Low" However, in the episode "Frost & Fire", she breaks up with Finn after he inadvertently insults her in an attempt to get her and the Ice King to fight each other. Confused by her feelings, she overthrows her father as king and installs a new government and outlaws lies of any kind. She forgives Finn for what he did to her, allows him to visit any time, but declines his offer to rekindle their romantic relationship. In "Bun Bun", Finn genuinely apologizes for the way he treated Flame Princess, and the two once again become friends.

=== Lady Rainicorn ===
Lady Rainicorn (voiced by Niki Yang in the TV series and Dee Bradley Baker in the original pilot short) is a Rainicorn, a half-rainbow half-unicorn creature, as well as Jake's girlfriend and Princess Bubblegum's companion. She can turn objects and people different colors, and she can fly because her body intercepts light and can "dance" on it, which also explains her movement and why she has a rainbow pattern. She grew up in the Crystal Dimension, and spent her early years dating a dog-hating rainicorn named Lee. Eventually, she saw the error of her ways and escaped to Ooo. In the pilot short, she makes pigeon-like sounds to communicate, but in the series, she speaks Korean. Jake and Lady's relationship is a serious one, and in the end of the episode "Lady and Peebles", it was revealed that Lady was pregnant. In "Jake the Dad", Lady bears five puppies with Jake: Charlie, T.V., Viola, Kim Kil Whan, and Jake Jr.

=== Betty Grof ===
Betty Grof (voiced both by Lena Dunham and Felicia Day) is the former fiancée of Simon "Ice King" Petrikov, turned recurring antagonist. Betty and Simon were partners and lovers studying ancient artifacts. When Simon found the enchanted crown and put it on, it turned him mad, scaring Betty in the process and resulted in her leaving him and disappearing. She returns in the episode "Betty", where Simon, having lost his powers to Bella Noche, used what magic was left to contact Betty in the past. Betty, overjoyed, jumps into the future to be with him. Upon learning that Simon is dying, Betty battles Bella Noche returning all magic and turning Simon back into Ice King. Since then, Betty has made cameos in various episodes looking for a way to return Simon to normal. She briefly returns in "You Forgot Your Floaties" where she teams up with Magic Man to help him become the new globhead. In return, Betty would learn more about the wizards in Ooo so she can help Simon. In the end, the experiment goes awry and Betty steals Magic Man's powers turning him normal and driving herself insane. Later, Betty steals Ice King's crown and reprograms it so that he can potentially return to Simon. This ends up slowly killing him and Princess Bubblegum and Marceline send their consciousness into the crown to stop an A.I. Betty from destroying Ice King's mind.

=== Peppermint Butler ===
Peppermint Butler (voiced by Steve Little), also known as Pep, is an anthropomorphic peppermint candy that lives in the Candy Kingdom and is Princess Bubblegum's butler, but is later revealed to be a practitioner of dark magic with only a few knowing the truth. This is hinted at when he revealed that he is good friends with Death as he summoned a portal to the land of the dead for Finn and Jake in return for their flesh should they return, the two dismissing it as a joke. Further hints of Peppermint Butler's secret activities are seen when he uses Cinnamon Bun as a vessel for a demon he summoned in "The Suitor". It is also implied that he has violent tendencies in "The Eyes", when he calls Finn and Jake to help him dispose of a body he "found" in his yard. During the events of "Nemesis", Peppermint Butler finds himself being targeted by a demon slayer named Peace Master; Peppermint Butler manages to drive Peace Master off by turning two of his children into magical creatures and threatening to do the same with the third if not left alone.

=== Prismo ===
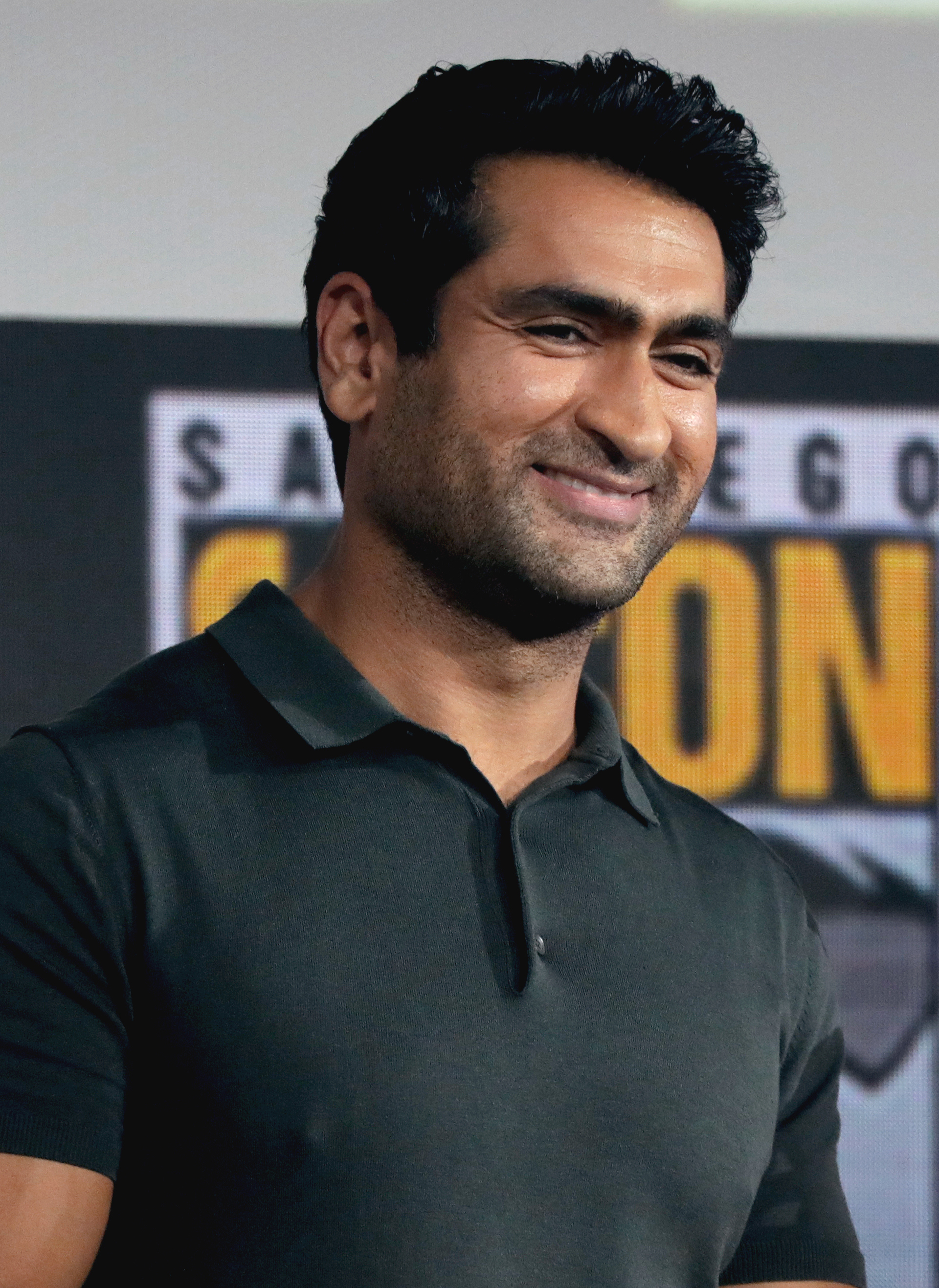
Kumail Nanjiani plays Prismo in Adventure Time.

Prismo (voiced by Kumail Nanjiani in Adventure Time and Adventure Time: Fionna and Cake Season 2, and Sean Rohani in Adventure Time: Fionna and Cake Season 1) is a two-dimensional wish-granting entity. First encountered by Finn, Jake and Lich during the events of "Finn the Human", Prismo reveals that he will grant only one wish to anyone. However, his wishes often come at a price. Despite this, he strikes up a friendship with Jake; Prismo, Jake, and the Cosmic Owl then spend time together. The events of "Wake Up" reveal that Prismo is the dream manifestation of a sleeping old man; once the man is awoken, Prismo disappears, only to return once the man falls asleep. Prismo, and the sleeping man, are both killed by the Lich during "Wake Up", but Finn and Jake manage to revive him in the episode "Is That You?" He is later revealed to have been the creator of Fionna and Cake, as well as their entire universe. He had become bored with watching the multiverse and decided to create his own universe with characters closely similar to the residents of Ooo. Due to such an action being forbidden, he inserted the universe into Ice King's mind as it was the only thing just insane enough to retain such information.

== Recurring antagonists ==
=== Martin Mertens ===
Martin Mertens (voiced by Stephen Root) is the deadbeat father of Finn who is a con-artist and thief by profession. As revealed in the Islands miniseries, Martin was a resident of Founders Island who fell in love with Minerva and raised Finn with her. Martin was then forced to leave for Ooo, taking Finn with him. Martin later abandoned his son in a forest and was subsequently imprisoned in the Crystal Citadel for committing a "cosmic crime". Finn and Jake free him in the episode "Escape from the Citadel", although Martin shows more interest in escaping than reconnecting with his son. He eventually manages to escape the prison dimension by hitching a ride on a piece of floating debris; Finn's attempt to follow his father results in Finn's arm being severed. Martin ended up briefly in Ooo in "The Visitor" after a malfunctioning space-ship he acquired was redirected to Earth by Grob Gob Glob Grod's sacrifice. Martin takes advantage of both Finn and a friendly civilization to leave the planet in the spaceship's escape pod. After a misadventure on another planet in "On the Lam", acquiring a giant space moth in the process, Martin helps Finn in "The Comet" before leaving for a high plane of existence while making some amends with his son, knowing that though they will never see eye to eye, they do respect one another.

A character named "Mr. M," also voiced by Stephen Root, appears in "BMO," the first episode of Adventure Time: Distant Lands. Although it is never stated in the episode, Mr. M is heavily implied to be Martin: besides having a similar build, Mr. M shares Martin's selfish tendencies, his views on parenthoods, and even says the exact same lines such as "here comes the rascal" and "I gotta get outta here!" The episode is set prior to the events of the main series and offers information on what happened between when he left Finn and when he was imprisoned in the Cosmic Citadel. When asked by a fan to confirm his identity, Adventure Time showrunner Adam Muto remarked, "That sounds like an unsubstantiated rumor."

=== King of Ooo ===
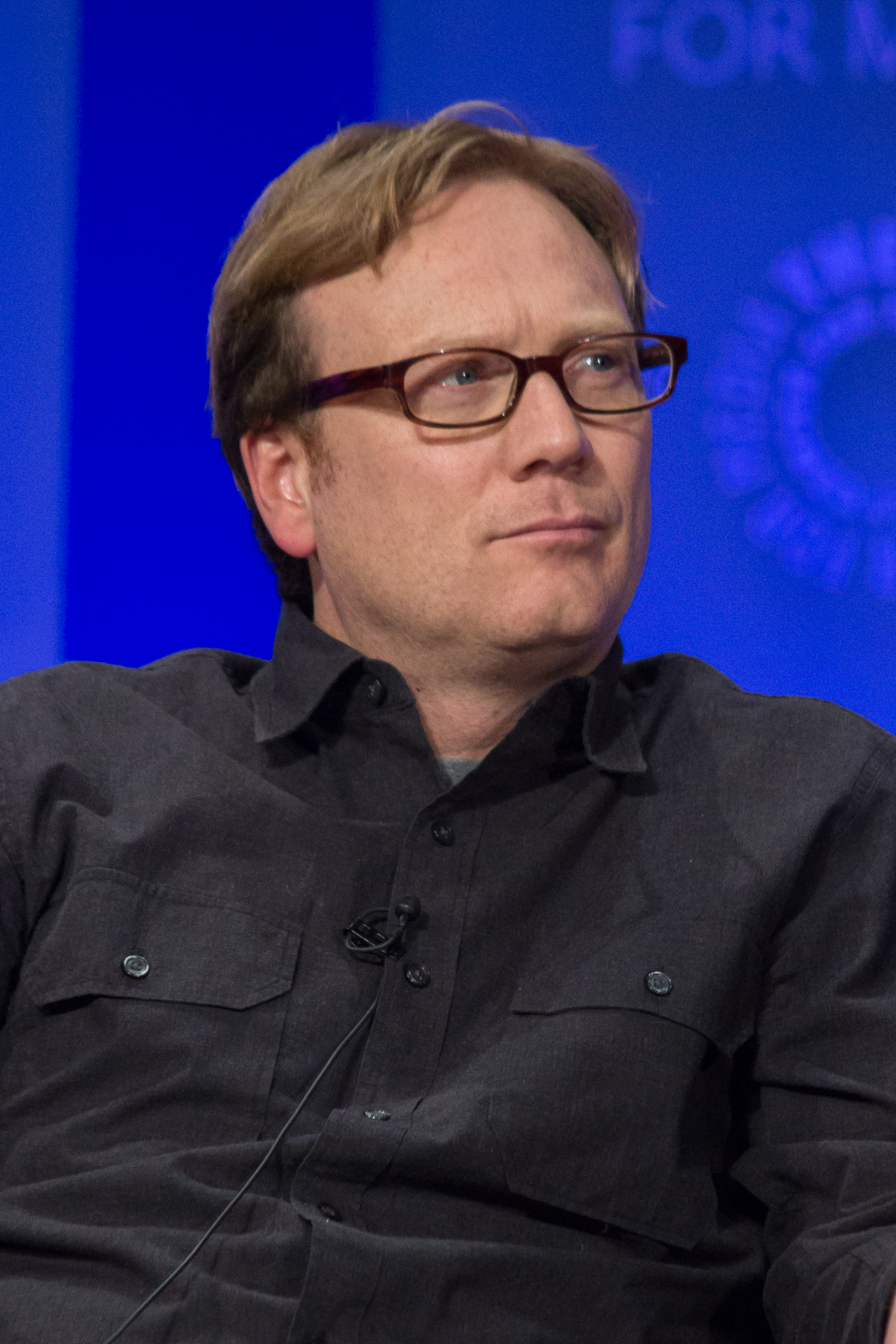
The King of Ooo is voiced by Andy Daly.

King of Ooo, or KOO (voiced by Andy Daly) is a charlatan who styles himself as the "One True" ruler of the lands. First introduced in the fifth-season episode "Apple Wedding", where he presides over Tree Trunks' and Mr. Pig's wedding. However, his action and behavior enrages Princess Bubblegum, and she has him locked away in her dungeon. In the sixth-season finale, he was elected the new princess of the Candy Kingdom, forcing Bubblegum to go into exile. At the start of season seven, he is still the leader of the kingdom before being deposed in the Stakes miniseries. The King of Ooo is assisted by Toronto (voiced by Paul Scheer) a conniving Shiba Inu.

=== Hunson Abadeer ===
Hunson Abadeer (voiced by Martin Olson) is the father of Marceline and the "completely evil" lord of the Nightosphere. Hunson Abadeer possesses a pendant that infuses him with power over the Nightosphereʻs chaotic evil that gives him the ability to suck the souls out of his victims. He appears first in the episode "It Came from the Nightosphere" where Finn summons him by acting out the ritual Marceline explained to him. Hunson tries to suck all the souls out of everyone before hearing the song Marceline wrote based on him eating her French fries in the past, managing to make peace with his daughter and before being banished to the Nightosphere. However, during the events of "Return to the Nightosphere"/"Daddy's Little Monster", Hunson later attempted to get Marceline to follow in his footsteps by tricking her into taking his pendant before eventually realizing his mistake and taking it back from Finn, who put it on to save Marceline from the "Chaotic Evil" that possessed the amulet, and whoever wore it.

=== Earl of Lemongrab ===
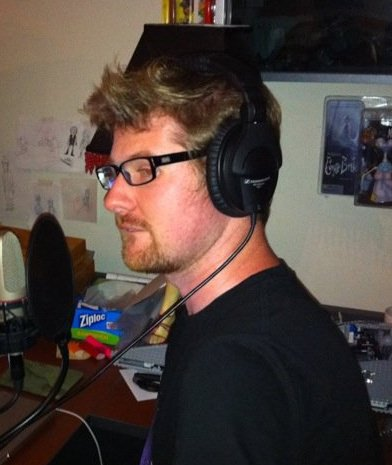
Justin Roiland plays Lemongrab.

The Earl of Lemongrab (voiced by Justin Roiland (Adventure Time), Jinkx Monsoon (Fionna and Cake)), more commonly called Lemongrab, is one of the first experiments Princess Bubblegum created that went wrong and lives in a realm also called Lemongrab. Lemongrab is socially dysfunctional and has trouble interacting with Candy Kingdom citizens due to his intolerance towards anything happy or comical. In "Too Young", he takes over as ruler of the Candy Kingdom when Bubblegum is deemed too young after being de-aged in the events of "Mortal Recoil"; jailing most of the candy subjects before Bubblegum returns to her original age. In "You Made Me", Lemongrab spies on the candy citizens while they sleep, which upsets Bubblegum as she attempts to fix him by giving him subjects to rule over. When this fails, Bubblegum creates a clone of Lemongrab so that he has someone who understands him. Since then, the original Lemongrab has worn a black uniform, while his clone brother dons a similar white uniform. In "All Your Fault", after Bubblegum forgot to take the instructions of creating life with her, the Lemongrabs begin making similar-minded lemon candy citizens out of the food that she sent them. Luckily, Bubblegum managed to wipe the knowledge from the Lemongrabs' minds. During the events of "Another Five More Short Graybles" the original Lemongrab becomes an overweight despot after eating part of his clone brother after he accidentally broke their "child" Lemonsweets. In "Too Old", Lemongrab swallows his now-crippled and repenting clone after Princess Bubblegum takes away one of their subjects, a lemon boy named Lemonhope. In "Lemonhope", the eponymous lemon child overthrows Lemongrab by using his soothing music to blow the tyrant up. Soon after, Princess Bubblegum manages to graft Lemongrab back together with what remained of his clone brother and other lemon subjects caught in the explosion. The sixth-season episode "The Mountain" suggests that this new Lemongrab, while still somewhat off, is a much more competent ruler.

=== Fern ===
Fern (voiced by Hayden Ezzy and Brad Neely in his "Green Knight" persona) is a grass clone of Finn that was created through the cracked Finn Sword and the Grass Demon that inhabited Finn's Grass Sword. He was initially confused by the presence of Finn and claimed that he was Finn, or rather was in denial about it. He attempted to fit into Finn's usual lifestyle, but was confused by everyone's response to him. He eventually came to accept that he wasn't Finn, but that he could be like him if he wanted to. After trying to find what his purpose is from the Grass Wizard (the one who gave Finn the Grass Sword to begin with) he is shocked to discover that he was made simply for fun and knocks out his "creator" to the point that he ends up in the hospital. Afterwards, Fern gives himself his name and decides to find his true purpose. However, in "Whispers," Fern begins to show some slight jealousy over Finn's capabilities against his own lack thereof. He then plots to take his place after he discovers that he can copy Finn's exact appearance. His plan is foiled when Finn discovers the various applications his arm can do. During an intense fight between them, Finn accidentally destroys Fern, but the latter's remains are picked up by Uncle Gumbald. He is reborn as the Green Knight and considers himself Finn's nemesis. In the series finale, "Come Along with Me", he is freed from the Grass Demon that was holding him. This causes his body to slowly decay. After the final battle with GOLB, Fern asks Finn to plant him at the Tree House (unaware that it was destroyed during the battle), leaving behind a seed as he dies. Finn and Jake later plant the seed where the Tree House used to be, and a new tree immediately grows from it, with a reborn Finn Sword planted at the top. A thousand years after the events of the series, two new adventurers, Shermy and Beth (the latter being a descendant of Jake) climb the tree, which has grown immense since then, and acquire the Finn Sword on top of it.

As of Fionna and Cake, Fern appears as a genderswapped human character named "Fennel", voiced by Vico Ortiz.

=== Uncle Gumbald ===
Uncle Gumbald (voiced by Fred Melamed and Mark Hamill in his Punch Bowl persona) is Princess Bubblegum's uncle, former member of her royal family, and the main antagonist of the final season. He was created alongside Aunt Lolly and Cousin Chicle by Bubblegum in her attempt to have a familial bond with someone besides her brother. Gumbald desired power and wished to profit off Ooo, deciding to get rid of Bubblegum by turning her into a foolish candy being by using "dumdum juice," which he used on his co-conspirators Lolly and Chicle in an act of betrayal. Bubblegum caught on and transformed Gumbald into an unintelligent punch bowl entity, convincing her to create candy citizens with low intelligence. After Lumpy Space Princess saves Ooo by neutralizing it of any alterations caused by the elementals, Gumbald and his family were restored. Then Gumbald sets out for revenge by destroying everything Bubblegum holds dear, specifically Finn, by reviving Fern as the Green Knight. In "Gumbaldia", he and his family gather a group of the series' past villains who hold grudges against the Candy Kingdom for their army—including the Squirrel, Ricardio the Heart Guy, Bandit Princess, Samantha the Warrior Dog, Peace Master, Me-Mow, Pete Sassafras, Ash the Warlock, Sir Slicer, Scorcher, Fern the Green Knight, as well as Gunter and a confused Ice King—to begin the "Gum War". But Gumbald ends up being betrayed by Lolly who turned him back into his punch bowl form in the series finale, "Come Along with Me", so she can make peace with Bubblegum.

=== GOLB ===
GOLB is the embodiment of chaos, capable of corrupting and fusing creatures into monsters or erasing people from existence altogether. He was first introduced in the episode "Puhoy", when he is briefly glimpsed by Finn as he returns to Ooo from the Pillow World. In the episode "You Forgot Your Floaties", it is revealed that at one point, he attacked Mars and wiped Magic Man's wife, Margles, from existence. This catastrophe set off a series of events that eventually culminated in Magic Man losing his sanity. GOLB is so powerful that not even the wish magic of Prismo could bring Margles back. It is also known that the Lich claimed to be "the last scholar of GOLB".

He plays a significant role in the series finale "Come Along with Me", being summoned to Ooo in the aftermath of the Great Gum War, where he creates monstrous mutations out of the assembled Candy People armies. After GOLB swallows Finn, Betty, and the Ice King, he "digests" them, stripping them down to their basic forms, reverting the latter two to their original human states. The people of Ooo discover that GOLB's nature as a being of chaos makes him vulnerable to the harmonious nature of music, and they are able to cut a hole into his stomach by singing at him. Finn and Simon manage to escape, but Betty remains inside GOLB with the Ice King's Crown, which was returned to its original wish-granting state by GOLB's digestion. She wishes for the power to keep Simon safe, which ultimately fuses her and GOLB into a single entity, "GOLBetty". GOLBetty then departs Ooo, leaving behind only the Ice King's Crown.

=== The Lich ===
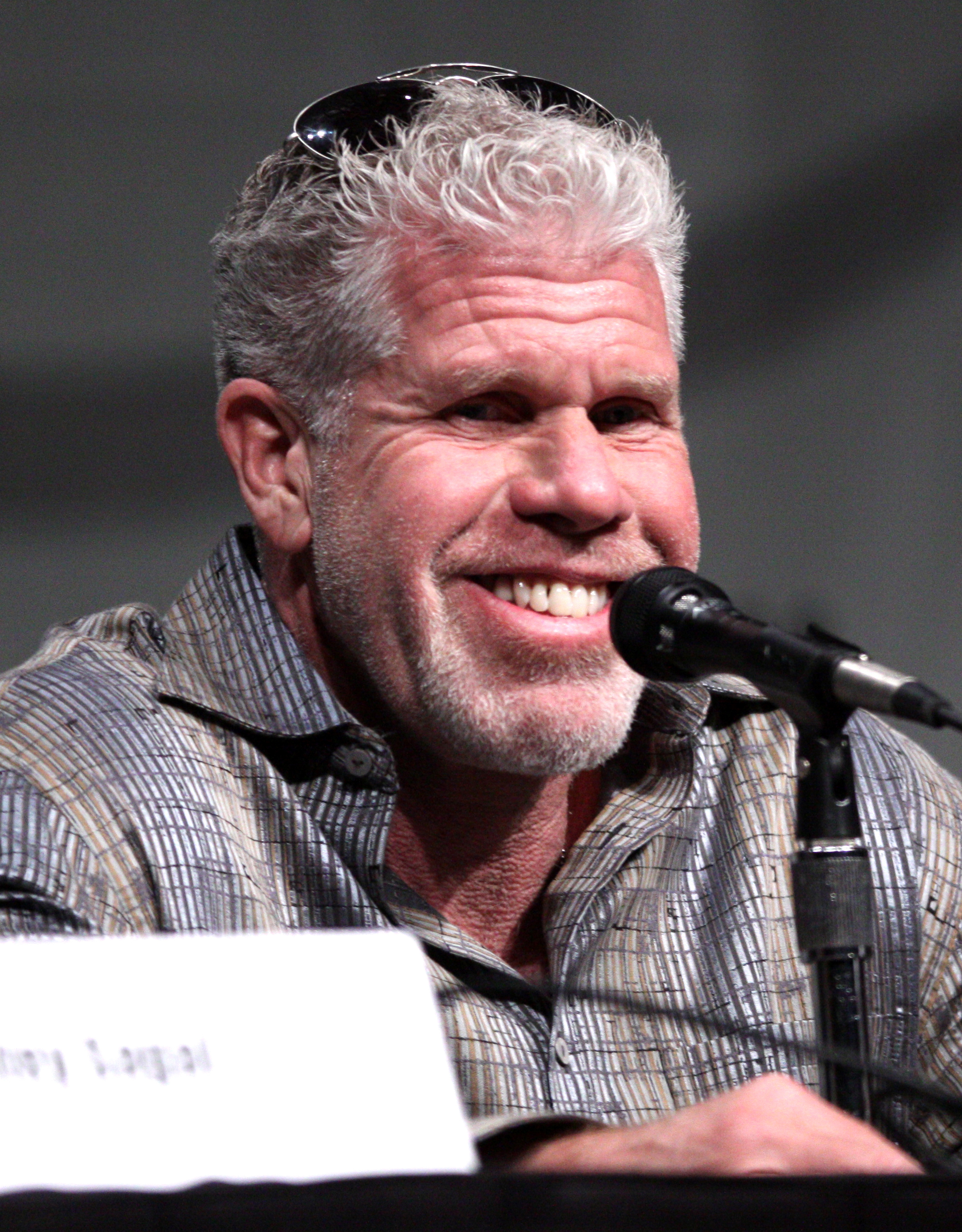
The Lich is voiced by Ron Perlman.

The Lich (voiced by Ron Perlman) is the main antagonist of Adventure Time. He is an ancient, cosmic manifestation of inevitable death who implied himself as a survivor of a time predating the current universe. The Lich's essence was deposited on Earth millions of years before the start of the show via the meteor that caused the K–Pg extinction and later gaining physical form near the end of the Mushroom War via a "mutagenic bomb" when he possessed a person who had been submerged in mutagenic waste. The Lich tried to end all life but was defeated and imprisoned within amber by Billy many years ago. After being freed from his prison by taking control of a snail, the Lich sets out to regain his power and destroy Ooo, but his body is destroyed by Finn. The Lich's disembodied spirit survived and possesses Princess Bubblegum's body before being defeated again by Finn and the Ice King, causing him to end up possessing the snail that initially released him from the amber. Going into hiding in his snail vessel, the Lich arranged for a bear to trick Finn into giving him the Enchiridion for his master plan: to attach the jewels from the various crowns of power, most of which are worn by the princesses, to the book's cover and create a portal to the Multiverse to reach Time Room and have Prismo grant his wish to obliterate all life. Though the Lich takes Billy's corpse prior, his plan ultimately fails when Jake used his own wish to retroactively alter the Lich's original request to send Finn and Jake home safely. This resulted in a purposeless Lich trapped in a comatose state within Prismo's chamber until the events of "Wake Up" and "Escape from the Citadel" when Finn and Jake need to commit a cosmic crime to reach the multiverse prison called the Citadel. This stirs the Lich as he kills Prismo's physical body to reach the structure with the intent to corrupt it and its prisoners. However, having completely rotted Billy's remains off, the Lich is subjected to the regenerative properties of the Citadel's Guardian and is transformed into a harmless giant baby who is then entrusted to Tree Trunks and Mr. Pig who named him Sweet P. In "Gold Stars", though haunted by fleeting recollections of being the Lich, Sweet P has no memory of his former identity. The mind of the Lich is seen to briefly reemerge whenever the child is threatened and under severe emotional stress, as shown when Sweet P is threatened and mocked by the King of Ooo and Toronto whom he terrorizes with nightmarish visions.

== Recurring supporting characters ==
=== Cinnamon Bun ===
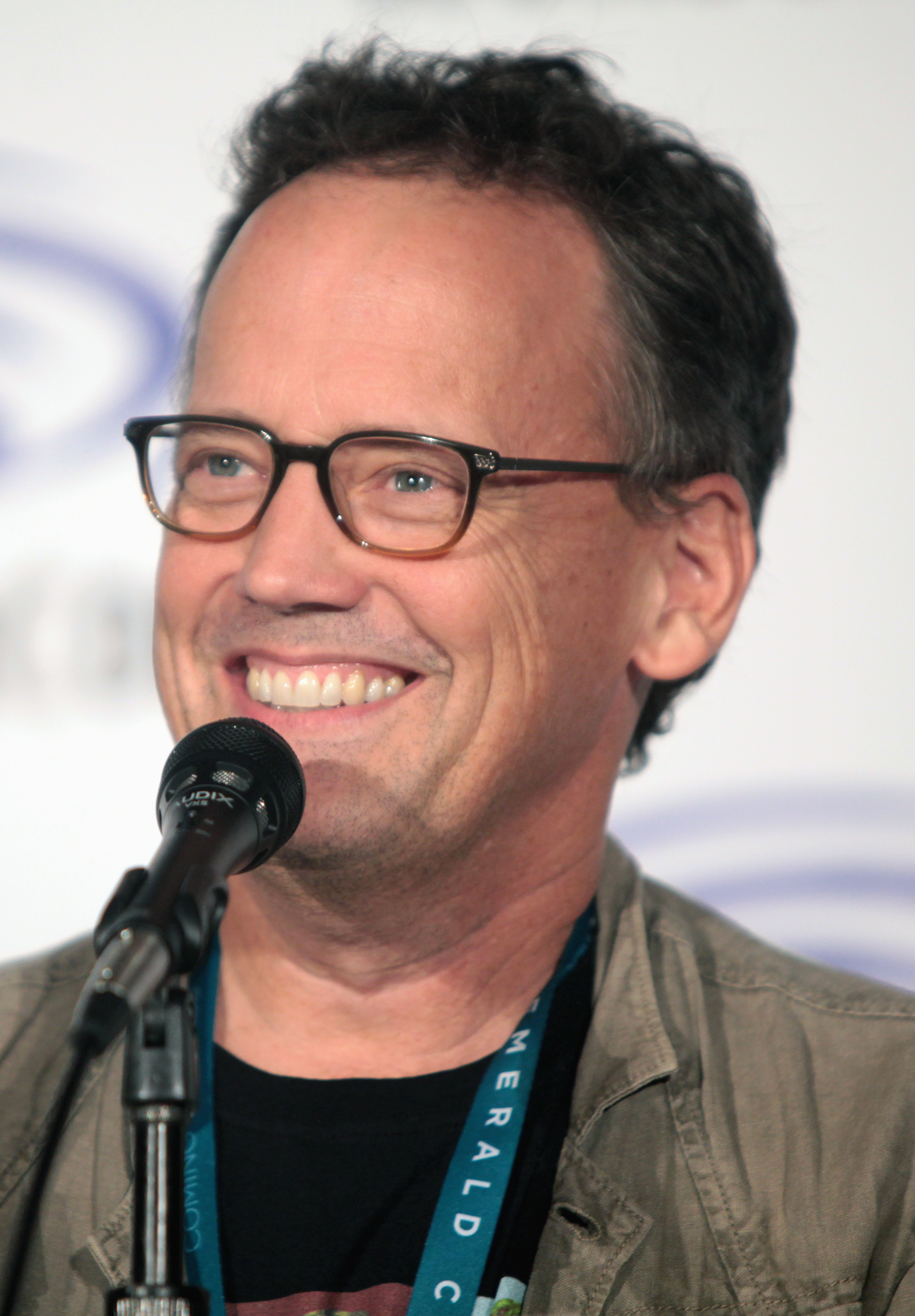
Prolific voice actor Dee Bradley Baker voices Cinnamon Bun, as well as many other minor characters.

Cinnamon Bun (voiced by Dee Bradley Baker) is an anthropomorphic cinnamon roll from the Candy Kingdom who usually tries to impress people by doing tricks or volunteering for tasks, but usually ends up failing. Princess Bubblegum refers to him as being "half baked" due to his simple-minded nature. He became the new Royal Tart Toter after the old Royal Tart Toter became senile. After expressing unhappiness with Princess Bubblegum's actions, Cinnamon Bun assists Flame Princess in overthrowing her evil father and staying by her side. In "Red Throne", Cinnamon Bun becomes "fully baked" after being struck by flame, gaining intelligence as he declares himself Flame Princess' champion and knight, while professing his platonic love for her.

=== N.E.P.T.R. ===
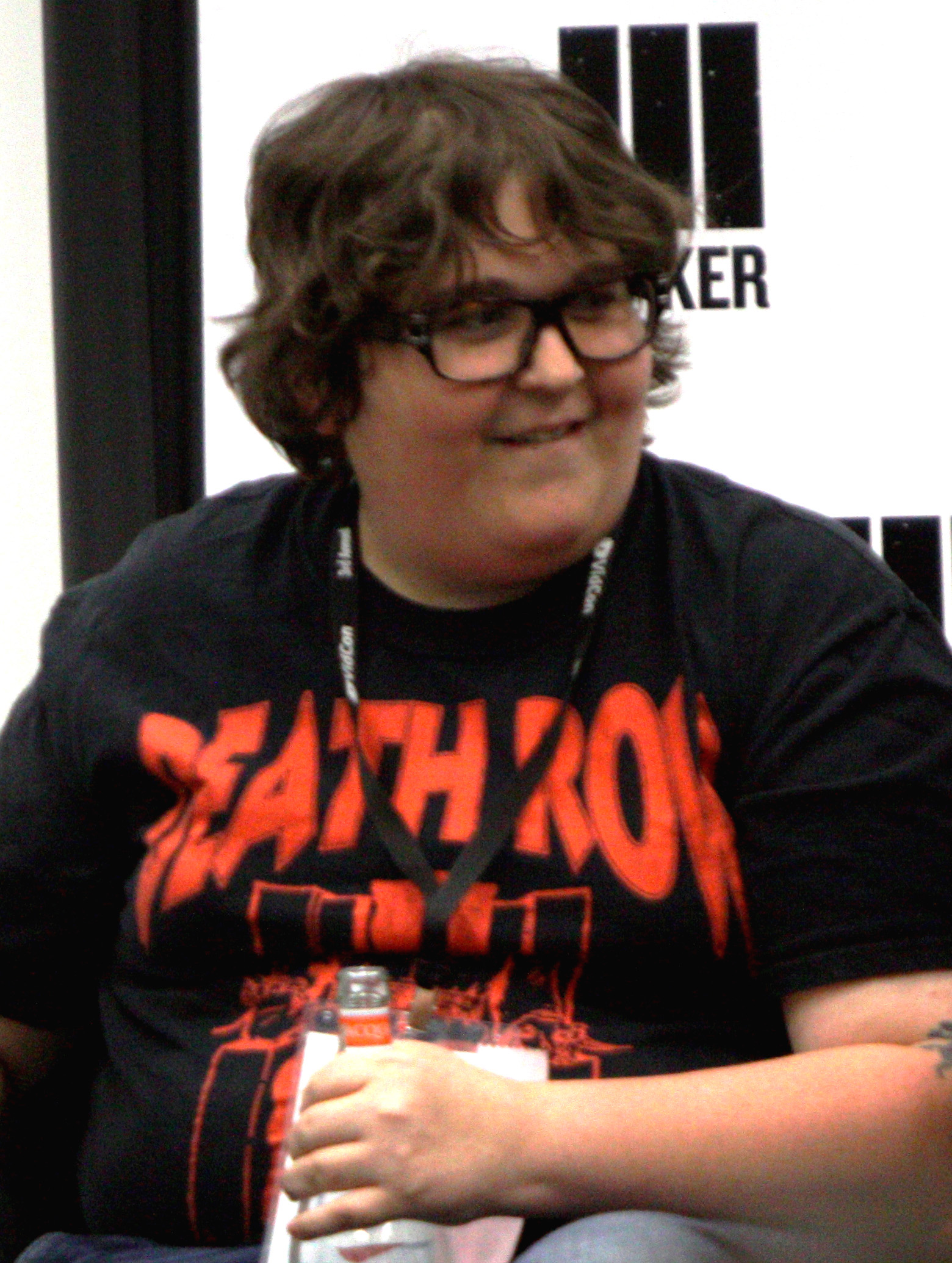
Andy Milonakis voices N.E.P.T.R.

N.E.P.T.R. (voiced by Andy Milonakis) is a sentient robot created by Finn and (by accident) Ice King; his name is an acronym standing for "Never-Ending-Pie-Throwing Robot" and is sometimes written phonetically as "Nepter". As such, he has a father-son connection with both Finn and the Ice King. He was originally made to prank Jake. N.E.P.T.R. is often neglected by others: in "Hot to the Touch" he returns after being forgotten about in a game of hide-and-seek, in "BMO Noire" BMO tells him that they are different and cannot spend time together, and in "Mystery Dungeon" the Ice King mistakes N.E.P.T.R. for BMO. Even though BMO tells N.E.P.T.R. that they cannot spend time together in the episode "BMO Noire", the two are seen spending time together in several subsequent episodes.

=== Gunter ===
Gunter (voiced by Tom Kenny) is a penguin that most commonly accompanies the Ice King, despite occasionally attempting to do harm to him. Although Gunter has appeared in many episodes, it is heavily implied that there are many other Gunters and that the name is simply something that the Ice King calls all of his penguins. The Ice King also referred to Marceline as Gunter while she traveled with him. The reason that the Ice King is seemingly fixated on the name is due to the nature of the ice crown: it was originally constructed by a magician named Evergreen (also voiced by Tom Kenny), whose apprentice was named Gunter (voiced by Pamela Adlon). This original Gunter later used the crown in an attempt to become like his master, at the cost of his sanity. Thus, the name "Gunter" seems to be intrinsically connected to the magic of the crown.

During the sixth season, Gunter the penguin is revealed be a primordial space demon named Orgalorg, who desired to absorb the catalyst comet. Orgalorg ended up in his current state after being defeated by Grob Gob Glob Grod and exiled to early Earth. The planet's gravity condensed Orgalorg into his current powerless and amnesiac penguin-like form as he wandered the planet for ages before he was found by the Ice King. Regardless of the memory loss, Gunter accidentally regains his memories and orchestrates a series of events to use the dethroned Bubblegum's spaceship to assume his true form and absorb a catalyst comet. He is defeated by Finn regressing back to his weakened state. Gunther later acquires Ice King's crown in the series finale. While Jake worries he'll use it to become Orgalorg again, he instead merges with the crown, becoming the Ice Thing. He ends taking Simon's place as the ruler of the Ice Kingdom and marries Turtle Princess. The glimpses into the future shown in "Graybles 1000+", "Come Along with Me" and Fionna and Cake reveal that Ice Thing ended up outliving Turtle Princess, eventually turning into an insane beast under the crown's influence. He appears to be an enemy of Jake's descendants for unknown reasons.

The character's name has been pronounced a variety of ways, including /ɡʌntər/, /ɡuːntər/, and /ɡʌnθər/; this is because in the original script, the name was spelled Günter, with an umlaut over the u, causing Kenny to use the proper German pronunciation. When the umlaut was dropped, Kenny switched to a different name. In order to justify this discrepancy, the crew rationalized that there were many penguins with similar sounding names.

=== Tree Trunks ===
Tree Trunks (voiced by Polly Lou Livingston) is an elderly yellow elephant who speaks in a southern drawl. Tree Trunks lives in a small house in the forest surrounded by her apple orchard. Tree Trunks uses the apples in the orchard to make apple pies. She first appeared in a self-titled episode; when she attempted to eat a crystal apple, she was accidentally transported to a dimension filled with crystal people where she was transformed into the despotic and evil Quartzion. Finn and Jake were able to restore her to normal and get her back to Ooo. Tree Trunks is in a relationship with Mr. Pig (voiced by Ron Lynch), whom she met during the events of "The Apple Thief"; the pair married in "Apple Wedding". At the conclusion of "Escape from the Citadel", Mr. Pig and Tree Trunks adopted the Lich, who had been turned into a harmless baby that they named Sweet P.

=== Billy ===
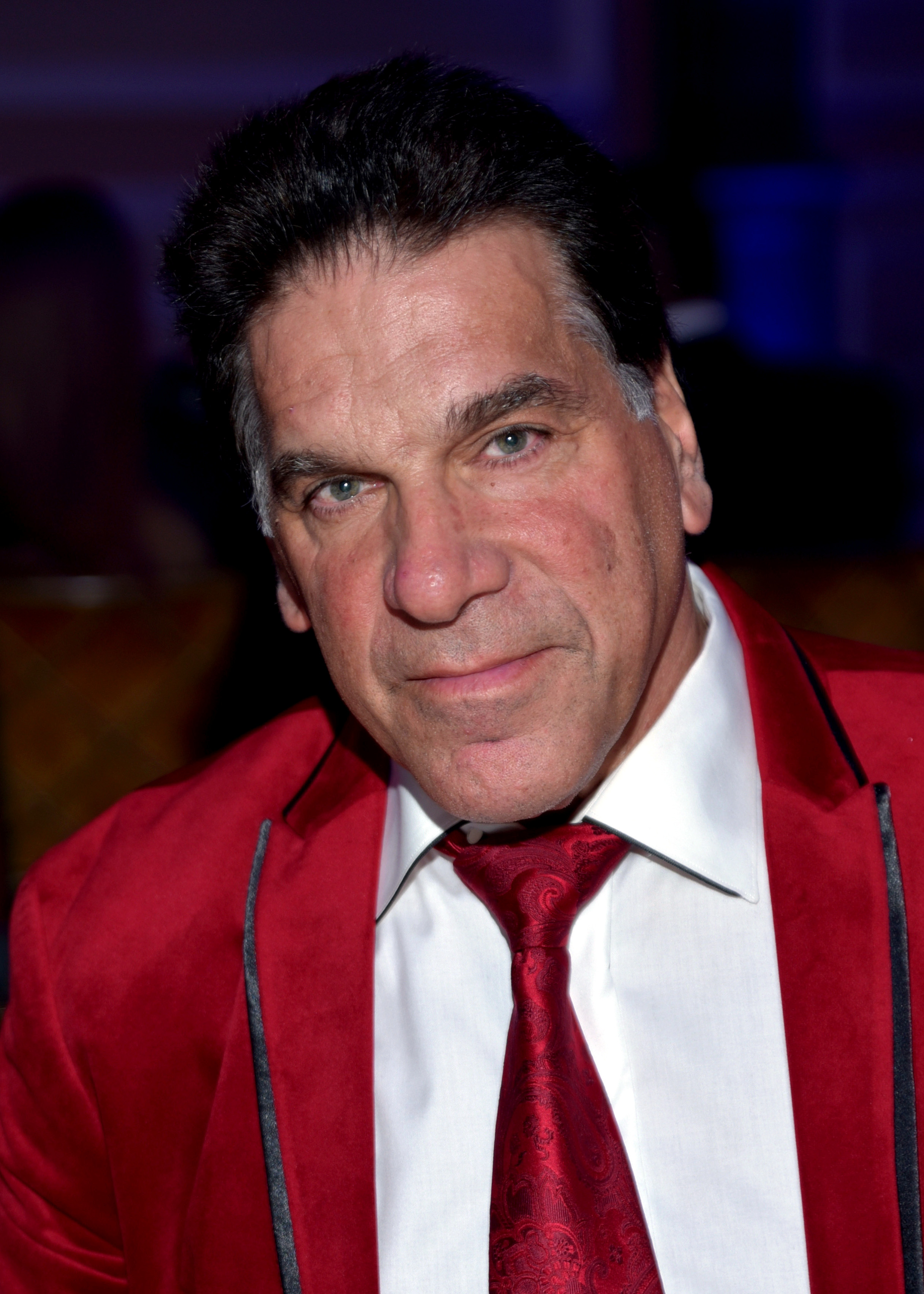
Lou Ferrigno voices Billy

Billy (voiced by Lou Ferrigno) is, according to Finn and Jake, "the greatest warrior ever". He was once a great hero who is known to have rescued Cotton Candy Princess from the Fire Count, slain an evil ocean, and fought against a giant bear. Perhaps most importantly, he is also said to have defeated the Lich in his youth. As time wore on, however, he lost hope in fighting and developed a more pacifist outlook into solving the woes of the world; despite this, Finn is able to restore his hope once again in the episode "His Hero". In "The Lich", the Lich kills Billy and possesses his body and tricks Finn and Jake into using the Enchiridion to open a portal into other dimensions. After his bucket list is completed by Finn, Billy's spirit manifests itself in the stars, thanking Finn for his assistance and revealing that Finn's human father is still alive. After delivering this message, Billy's spirit is finally allowed to rest in peace.

=== Susan Strong ===
Susan Strong (voiced by Jackie Buscarino), whose name is later revealed to originally have been "Kara", is a large muscular woman with a mechanic implant on her head. In the Islands miniseries, Kara came from a human colony and was sent to Ooo by Minerva to retrieve Finn, only to lose her memory and live with the half-fish-like humanoid Hyooman tribe. At the time, having a limited vocabulary, Susan could not respond to Finn's questions until the events of "Beautopia". In "Dark Purple", Susan formed a freedom fighting group of sorts against the Super Porp Soda Company. In the two part episode, "Preboot" and "Reboot", Susan's implant is activated and she attempts to abduct Finn from retrieval before she is knocked out by the Grass Sword. After recovering from her injuries, her implant removed, Susan accompanies Finn and Jake to Founders Island in the Islands miniseries and learns her origins.

=== Abracadaniel ===
Abracadaniel (voiced by Steve Little) is a wizard who meets Finn and Jake during the season three episode "Wizard Battle". In this episode, Abracadaniel has come to terms that he will not win, but Finn and Jake help him beat all the other contestants in order to prevent the Ice King from getting a chance to kiss Princess Bubblegum, which was the prize for winning Wizard Battle. Abracadaniel returns in "Wizards Only, Fools", this time as the unwitting assistant to a group of wizards who plan to sacrifice Abracadaniel in order to advance their magical prowess. Finn and Jake later invite Abracadaniel over during the events of "Play Date" in order to try to get Ice King to leave the tree fort. After the events of "Play Date", it would appear that Abracadaniel and Ice King have developed some sort of friendship, judging by the fact that the two of them were instrumental in organizing the wizard road trip in "Thanks for the Crab Apples, Giuseppe".

=== Huntress Wizard ===
Huntress Wizard (voiced by both Maria Bamford and Jenny Slate in the series, Olivia Olson in Finn & Jake Investigations, and Ashly Burch in Fionna and Cake) is a nature-based wizard who Finn befriends and falls in love with during the seventh season. She first appears in "Wizard Battle" as one of the many wizards competing in the tournament. She has her first substantial appearance in "Flute Spell", where she spots Finn in a lake playing a flute. She demands that he help her summon the Spirit Dream Warrior, possibly to amend a previous relationship. However to her and Finn's surprise, they have both fallen in love with each other, but Huntress Wizard states that they are "exceptional beasts" and therefore incapable of being together, which Finn concurs. This claim is recanted in "The Wild Hunt" when Huntress Wizard returns to help Finn, who is suffering from a previous trauma, into defeating a creature dubbed "the Grumbo". After killing it, both admit that they are still in love with one another and kiss.

=== Magic Man ===
Magic Man (voiced by Tom Kenny) is a Martian and the brother to Grob Gob Glob Grod who uses his talent with magic to nihilistically harm others. Magic Man was once a gifted scientist and magician, who tragically lost his wife, Margles, to the primeval being GOLB. In order to protect the entirety of Mars from the second coming of GOLB, he created an artificial intelligence named M.A.R.G.L.E.S., in honor of his wife, which he planned to install on the top of Olympus Mons. However, the installation went awry, resulting in Magic Man becoming mentally and emotionally damaged. He is first introduced in the episode "Freak City", where he transforms Finn into a huge foot. He returns in the fourth season entry "Sons of Mars", where his backstory is first hinted at. He makes brief reappearances in the fifth-season episode "All the Little People" (in which he gives Finn the titular miniature people) and the sixth-season episode "Everything's Jake" (in which he causes Jake to go on an adventure inside of himself), and he serves as the main antagonist in the episode "Time Sandwich", stealing Jake's titular sandwich. Following the events of "You Forgot Your Floaties", Magic Man's madness, sadness, and magic seem to have been transferred to Betty, Simon's fiancée, turning Magic Man into "Normal Man". In the eponymous eighth-season episode, Normal Man makes amends with his brother and returns to Mars, remorseful and ready to rule benevolently over his Martian compatriots.

=== Grob Gob Glob Grod ===
Grob Gob Glob Grod (voiced by Tom Kenny, Tom Gammill, Melissa Villaseñor, and Miguel Ferrer) is a four-headed deity from Mars, and the brother(s) of Magic Man. Each one of Grob Gob Glob Grod's heads has a distinct name and personality, and one in particular, Glob, is worshipped as a god in Ooo. After being often mentioned, the entity was first introduced in the series during the fourth season episode "Sons of Mars", wherein they attempt to take their brother, Magic Man, back to Mars and try him for his past crimes. Grob Gob Glob Grod reappears in the sixth-season episode "Astral Plane", wherein they seemingly give their lives up to protect Mars from a crashing spaceship piloted by Martin. However, in the eighth-season episode "Normal Man", it is revealed that they survived the collision, and their heads now are in orbit around Earth. In the same episode, Glob finally reconciles with Magic Man.

=== Snail ===
The snail (voiced by Pendleton Ward) is an easter egg that appears in every episode. It is a small beige snail with a brown spiral shell, usually seen waving happily at the camera. Inspired by the in-jokes in The Simpsons, Ward has acknowledged that he wanted to "make a game out of every episode of Adventure Time, where you could freeze-frame and find things in the background", such as the snail. The snail also serves an important plot point in the series; in the second-season episode "Mortal Folly", it is possessed by The Lich. After The Lich's physical body is destroyed in the following episode, it repossesses the snail until the events of the fourth-season finale "The Lich".

The snail does not appear in every episode of the spinoff series Distant Lands. According to showrunner Adam Muto in a Reddit thread, the crew for the show debated over whether to include the snail in every episode of the spinoff but decided against it in order to make Distant Lands distinct from the original series. Despite this, the snail was directly shown in two of the four Distant Lands episodes and its shell was shown in a third episode. This practice continued in the Fionna & Cake spinoff series, where in the first season the snail was shown in two of the ten episodes and its shell shown in another two episodes.
