= Grand Prix =

Grand Prix (plural Grands Prix) most commonly refers to:

- Grand Prix motor racing, a form of motorsport competition
  - List of Formula One Grands Prix, auto-racing events part of championships
    - Monaco Grand Prix, the most prestigious Formula One Grand Prix
  - Grand Prix motorcycle racing, a motorcycle-racing championship

Grand Prix may also refer to:

== Sports competitions ==
=== Athletics ===
- IAAF Grand Prix Final, a competition replaced by the IAAF World Athletics Final
- IAAF Super Grand Prix, a series of athletics meetings held until 2009

=== Chess ===
- FIDE Grand Prix
- Grand Prix Attack, an opening
- USCF Grand Prix

=== Combat sports ===
- D-Oh Grand Prix, annual professional wrestling tournament held by DDT Pro-Wrestling
- Dream Grand Prix, various mixed martial arts Dream Grand Prix tournaments
- International Fight League (IFL) Grand Prix, various mixed martial arts IFL Grand Prix tournaments
- International Wrestling Grand Prix, the governing body for the wrestling promotion New Japan Pro-Wrestling
- K-1 World Grand Prix, K-1's annual kickboxing World Grand Prix tournaments
- Pride Grand Prix, held by Pride Fighting Championships
- Strikeforce Grand Prix, a competition run by Strikeforce

=== Cycling ===
- Grand Prix Chantal Biya, a road bicycle racing event
- Grand Prix Velo Alanya (disambiguation)
- U.S. Gran Prix of Cyclocross, a cyclo-cross bicycle racing series

=== Equestrianism ===
- Grand Prix (horse race), now Prix Gladiateur, a horse race in France since 1862
- Grand Prix Dressage
- Grand Prix show jumping
- Nakayama Grand Prix, original name of the Arima Kinen (Yaphza) horse race in Japan

=== Motorsport ===
- Several events of American open-wheel car racing
- A1 Grand Prix
- Aero GP, flying competition
- D1 Grand Prix
- Grand Prix Masters
- Macau Grand Prix (not F1)
- New Zealand Grand Prix (not F1)
- Purdue Grand Prix, a Go-Kart race held at Purdue University
- Speedway Grand Prix (motorcycle speedway)
- MXGP, main class in Motocross World Championship

=== Snooker ===
- World Grand Prix (snooker)
- Xi'an Grand Prix
- Grand Prix (snooker), a former name of the World Open
- Six-red World Grand Prix, a former name of the Six-red World Championship
- Malta Grand Prix, a former professional snooker tournament
- Norwich Union Grand Prix, a former professional snooker tournament

=== Tennis ===
- Budapest Grand Prix
- Grand Prix tennis circuit
- Marrakech Grand Prix
- Porsche Tennis Grand Prix

=== Other sports ===
- World Grand Prix (darts)
- FIVB World Grand Prix, for women's volleyball
- Grand Prix de Futsal, international futsal competition
- Grand Prix gliding
- ISU Grand Prix of Figure Skating
- Rhythmic Gymnastics Grand Prix Series
- Sevens Grand Prix Series, European rugby tournaments
- The Grand Prix, greyhound racing competition
- SailGP

== Awards ==
- Grand Prix de Rome, scholarship awarded in France from 1663 to 1968
- Grand Prix (Belgian Film Critics Association)
- Grand Prix at Brussels International Film Festival (BRIFF)
- Grand Prix (CD Shop Awards)
- Grand Prix (Cannes Film Festival)
- Grand Prix at International Film Festival Bratislava
- Grand Prix de la ville d'Angoulême, a comics award
- Grand Prix de Littérature Policière, annual literary award for French and international crime fiction
- Grand prix Gobert, one of the prizes of the French Academy, awarded every year in the field of history since 1834
- Les Grands Prix, annual awards from the foundations of the Institut de France
- Tokyo Grand Prix, the award for best film at the Tokyo International Film Festival

== Arts and entertainment ==
=== Films ===
- Grand Prix (1934 film), a British motorsports drama
- Grand Prix (1966 film), an American drama about Formula One motor racing
- Grand Prix (2010 film), a South Korean horseracing drama
- Grand Prix (2022 film), a Czech film
- Grand Prix of Europe (film), a 2025 animated film

=== Music ===
- Grand Prix (album), by Teenage Fanclub
- Grand Prix (band), English rock band
- "Grand Prix" (song), by South Korean girl group Kep1er
- European Grand Prix for Choral Singing, an annual choral competition between the winners of six European choral competitions
- Eurovision Song Contest (originally named Grand Prix d'Eurovision de la Chanson)
  - Dansk Melodi Grand Prix, Danish selection for Eurovision Song Contest
  - Melodi Grand Prix, Norwegian selection for Eurovision Song Contest

=== Pinball ===
- Grand Prix (pinball), a 1976 pinball machine

=== Table or card games ===
- Grand Prix (Magic: The Gathering), magic tournaments

=== Television ===
- Grand Prix, a character from Adventure Time episode "Daddy-Daughter Card Wars"
- "Grand Prix" (CSI: Miami), seventh episode from second season of CSI: Miami
- "Grand Prix" (Northern Exposure), a 1994 episode
- Grand Prix (TV programme), BBC Television's coverage of Formula One motor racing
- El Grand Prix del verano, Spanish game show with Ramón García

=== Video games ===
- Grand Prix (video game) by Activision
- F-1 Sensation, the Japanese/European version of the cancelled NES game Grand Prix
- Formula One Grand Prix (video game)
- Grand Prix Challenge, by Atari
- Grand Prix Circuit (video game), by Accolade
- Grand Prix Legends (1967 season)
- Mario Kart Arcade GP, an arcade game in the Mario Kart series

== Other uses ==
- Pontiac Grand Prix, an American automobile formerly manufactured by General Motors

== See also ==
- Prix
- MotoGP (disambiguation)
- Grand (disambiguation)
- GP (disambiguation)
- Tourist Trophy (disambiguation), a "big trophy" awarded in some sport competitions
