= MotoGP (disambiguation) =

MotoGP is a class of the Road Racing World Championship Grand Prix.

MotoGP may also refer to:

- MotoGP (2000 video game)
- MotoGP: Ultimate Racing Technology, a 2002 video game
- MotoGP (2006 video game)
- MotoGP '08, a 2008 video game, the Wii version is known as MotoGP in some regions

== See also ==
- Superbike World Championship
- Moto2
- Moto3
- Grand Prix (disambiguation)
- Motorcycle (disambiguation)
- Moto (disambiguation)
- GP (disambiguation)
