= Adventure Time season 8 =

Adventure Time
- Season 8
- Region B Blu-ray case
- Showrunner: Adam Muto
- Starring: Jeremy Shada; John DiMaggio
- No. of episodes: 27

Release
- Original network: Cartoon Network
- Original release: March 26, 2016 – February 2, 2017

Season chronology
- ← Previous; Season 7 Next → Season 9

The eighth season of Adventure Time, an American animated television series created by Pendleton Ward, premiered on Cartoon Network on March 26, 2016, and concluded on February 2, 2017. It follows the adventures of Finn, a human boy, and his best friend and adoptive brother Jake, a dog with magical powers to change shape and size at will. Finn and Jake live in the post-apocalyptic Land of Ooo, where they interact with the other main characters of the show: Princess Bubblegum, The Ice King, Marceline the Vampire Queen, Lumpy Space Princess, BMO, and Flame Princess.

The miniseries Islands, which follows Finn, Jake, BMO (voiced by Niki Yang), and Susan Strong (voiced by Jackie Buscarino) as they leave Ooo and travel across the ocean to solve the mystery of Finn's past, aired during this season. It also features guest animators Alex and Lindsay Small-Butera (who worked on "Beyond the Grotto") and James Baxter (who worked on "Horse and Ball").

The season debuted with the episode "Broke His Crown", which was watched by 1.13 million viewers marking a slight decrease from the previous season finale, "The Thin Yellow Line", which was seen by 1.15 million viewers. "Islands Part 8: The Light Cloud," the eighth-season finale, was watched by 1 million viewers, making it the lowest-rated Adventure Time season finale at the time. Critical reception to the season was mostly positive, with The A.V. Club writer Oliver Sava expressing pleasant bemusement that the show's quality had not suffered despite this season being its eighth. Critics were also complimentary towards the Islands miniseries: In April 2017, Common Sense Media awarded the miniseries "The Common Sense Seal", and at the 69th Primetime Creative Arts Emmy Awards in 2017, the Islands episode "Imaginary Resources" won a Primetime Emmy Award for Outstanding Individual Achievement in Animation. Several compilation DVDs that contain episodes from the season have been released, and a set containing the entire season was released on September 4, 2018.

== Development ==
=== Concept ===
The series follows the adventures of Finn the Human, a human boy, and his best friend Jake, a dog with magical powers to change shape, grow, and shrink at will. Finn and Jake live in the post-apocalyptic Land of Ooo, where they interact with the other major characters, including: Princess Bubblegum, The Ice King, Marceline the Vampire Queen, Lumpy Space Princess, BMO, and Flame Princess. Common storylines revolve around Finn and Jake discovering strange creatures, dealing with the antagonistic, but misunderstood, Ice King, and battling monsters in order to help others. Multi-episode story arcs for this season include the introduction of the character Fern, and Finn meeting his mother and learning about what became of humanity.

=== Production ===
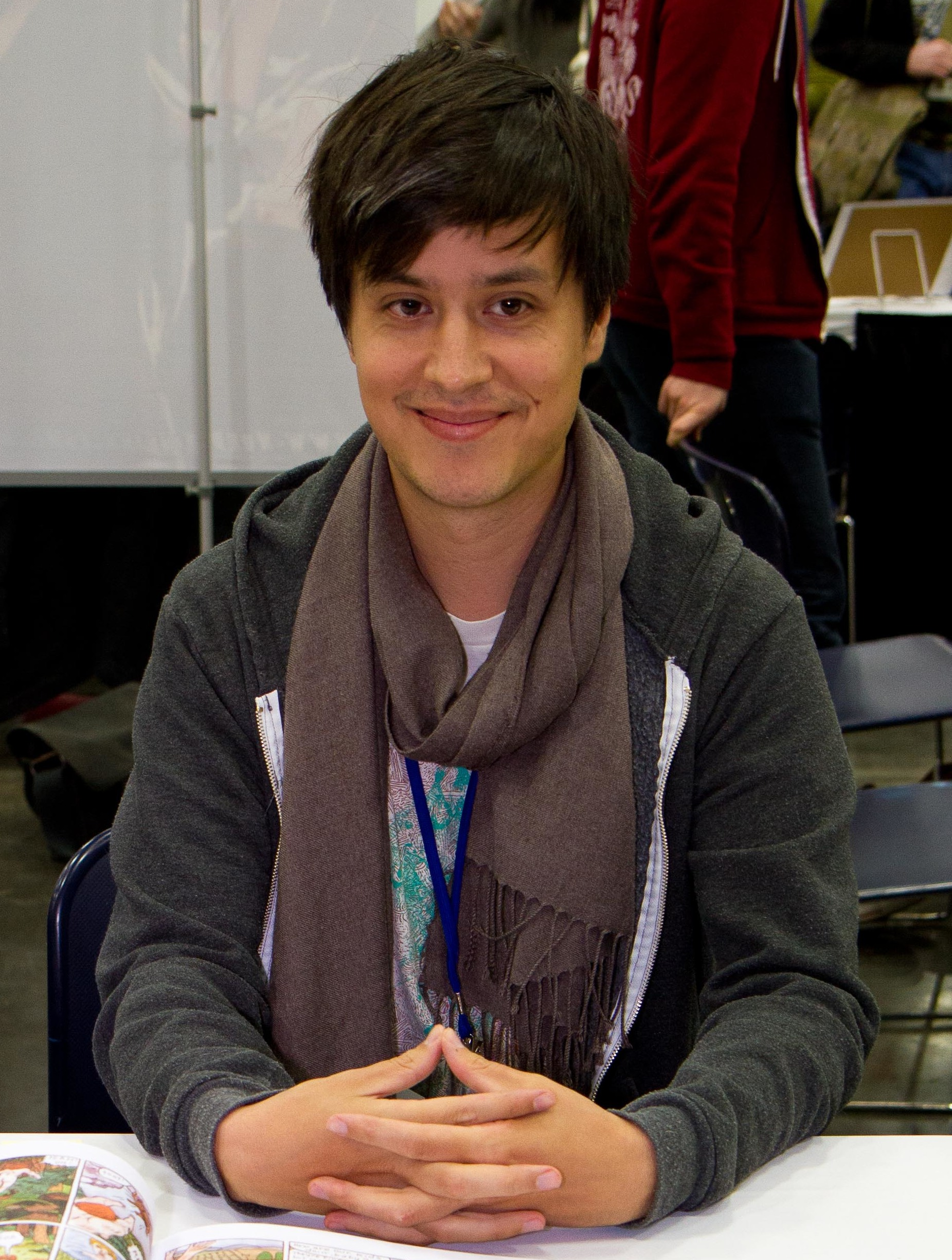
This was the last season to feature long-serving storyboard artist Jesse Moynihan.

On July 7, 2015, The Hollywood Reporter announced that the series had been renewed for an eighth season. The season's storyline writers included Jack Pendarvis, Adam Muto, Kent Osborne, and Ashly Burch. Originally, the show's seventh season was supposed to comprise the episodes "Bonnie & Neddy" through "Reboot", (Note: In the past, Adam Muto (the series' showrunner) had explicitly referred to "Preboot"/"Reboot" as being the collective finale to season seven. This ordering of the season was delineated by an image that hung in Muto's office, which listed episodes "Bonnie & Neddy" through "Reboot" as belonging to season seven.) and its eighth season was supposed to include the episodes "Two Swords" through "Three Buckets", (Note: The official Adventure Time production blog announced in January 2017 that "Two Swords"/"Do No Harm" collectively made up the eighth season premiere, and Adam Muto later explicitly confirmed that "Three Buckets" was envisioned as the season eight finale prior to "the official season divisions [having been] moved around." This means that episodes which aired in between these (e.g. "Two Swords" through the Islands miniseries) were originally considered part of season eight.) but when it came time to upload the seventh season onto streaming sites, Cartoon Network chose to end the season with its 26th episode, "The Thin Yellow Line." Consequently, the episodes "Broke His Crown" through "Reboot" (which had originally been ordered as the last episodes of the show's seventh season) and the episodes "Two Swords" through the Islands miniseries (which had originally been ordered as the beginning of the show's eighth season) were combined to form the show's official eighth season. This new episode count was cemented by the release of the complete seventh season DVD on July 18, 2017, which included episodes up until "The Thin Yellow Line", as well as the release of the complete eighth season on the Cartoon Network website. (Note: On Cartoon Network's official webpage, "Broke His Crown" is explicitly listed as the first episode of season eight, and the episode "Orb" is explicitly listed as the first episode of season nine, suggesting that the episodes that aired between these two now make up the show's eighth season.)

This season's episodes were produced in a process similar to those of the previous seasons. Each episode was outlined in two-to-three pages that contained the necessary plot information. These outlines were then handed to storyboard artists, who created full storyboards. (Note: Information regarding story development and storyboard artists is taken from the opening credits of the season's twenty-seven episodes.) Design and coloring were done at Cartoon Network Studios in Burbank, California, and animation was handled overseas in South Korea by Rough Draft Korea and Saerom Animation. Continuing a tradition that started with the fifth season episode "A Glitch is a Glitch", this season also features the work of guest animators. "Beyond the Grotto" features 7 minutes of animation courtesy of Alex and Lindsay Small-Butera, a husband and wife duo known for their web series Baman Piderman, and the episode "Horse and Ball" features animation courtesy of James Baxter. He had previously provided guest animation for the fifth-season episode "James Baxter the Horse". In both episodes, James Baxter the animator lends his voice to the equine character of the same name.

This was the final season to feature several long-serving storyboard artists and production crew members. Moynihan left the show after completing "Normal Man" to finish his web comic Forming. Finally, supervising director Andres Salaff left after this season to storyboard on Cartoon Network's series Uncle Grandpa. Conversely, the season also saw the return of former storyboard artist Ako Castuera (who returned to storyboard the episode "Broke His Crown" with Nyström before working as a storyboard revisionist, starting with "Two Swords"). and former storyboard artist and creative director Cole Sanchez (who took the position of one of the series' supervising directors starting with "Two Swords").

=== Miniseries ===
During the eighth season of Adventure Time, the miniseries Islands aired at the end of January and the beginning of February 2017. This event was first hinted at before the airing of the first Adventure Time miniseries Stakes (2015) when head story writer Kent Osborne revealed that the show would likely produce several more miniseries. Islands tells the story of Finn, Jake, BMO (voiced by Niki Yang) and Susan Strong (voiced by Jackie Buscarino) leaving Ooo and traveling across the ocean to solve the mystery of Finn's past. During their trip, they encounter various creatures, new friends, and a variety of mysterious islands. The voyage culminates with a trip to Founder's Island, where Finn learns what happened to the rest of the human race and meets his mother, Minerva (voiced by Sharon Horgan).

== Cast ==
The season's voice actors include: Jeremy Shada (Finn the Human), John DiMaggio (Jake the Dog), Tom Kenny (The Ice King), Hynden Walch (Princess Bubblegum), and Olivia Olson (Marceline the Vampire Queen). Ward himself provides the voice for several minor characters, including Lumpy Space Princess. Former storyboard artist Niki Yang voices the sentient video game console BMO in English, as well as Jake's girlfriend Lady Rainicorn in Korean. Polly Lou Livingston, a friend of Pendleton Ward's mother, Bettie Ward, plays the voice of the small elephant Tree Trunks. Jessica DiCicco voices Flame Princess, Finn's ex-girlfriend and the sovereign of the Fire Kingdom. Andy Milonakis voices N.E.P.T.R., a sentient robot who makes and throws pies. Justin Roiland provides the voice of the Earl of Lemongrab. Several episodes, including most of the episodes in the Islands miniseries, feature Jackie Buscarino, who voices Susan Strong. The Adventure Time cast records their lines together as opposed to doing it individually. This is to capture more natural sounding dialogue among the characters. Hynden Walch has described these group session as akin to "doing a play reading—a really, really out there play."

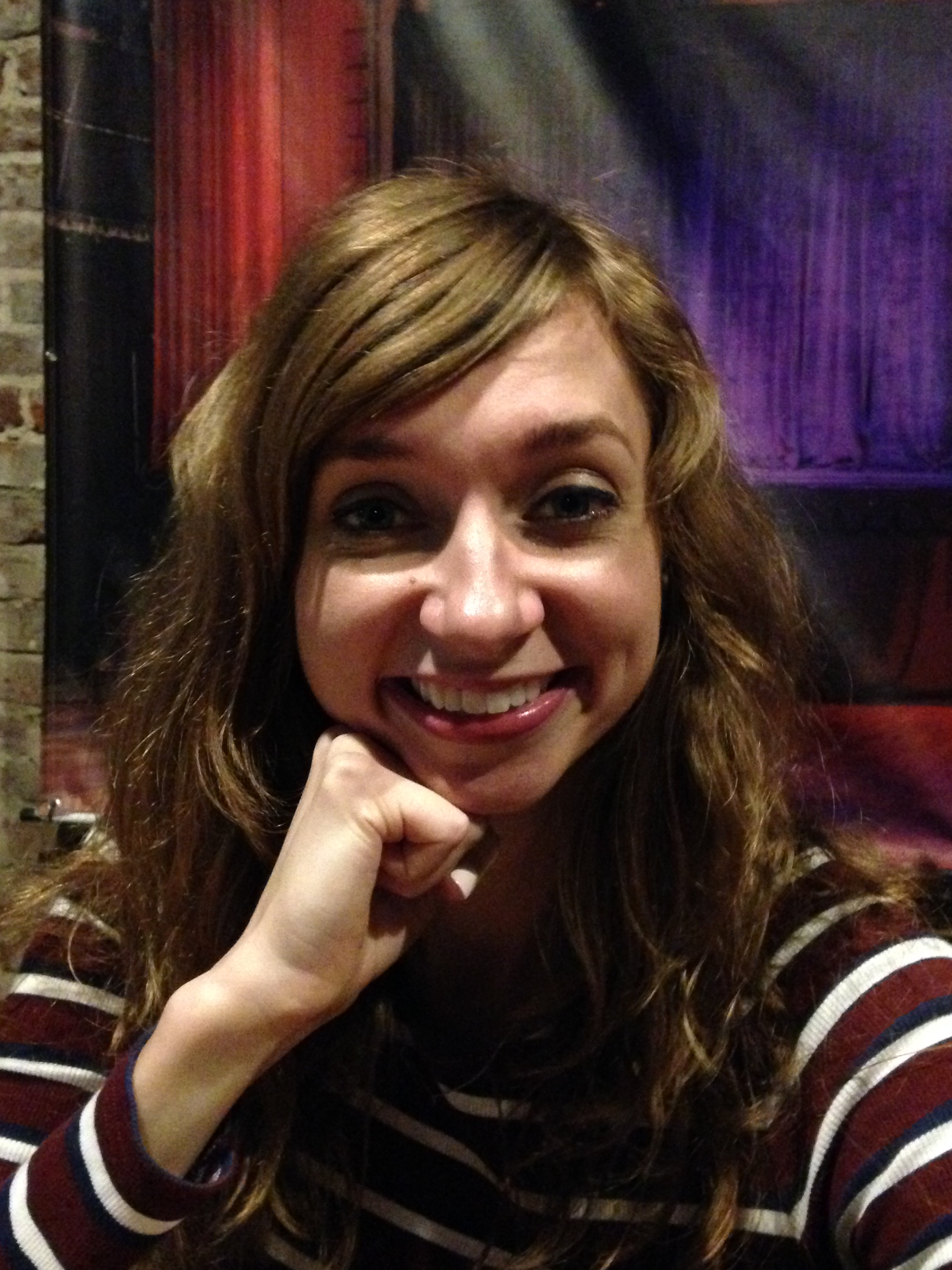
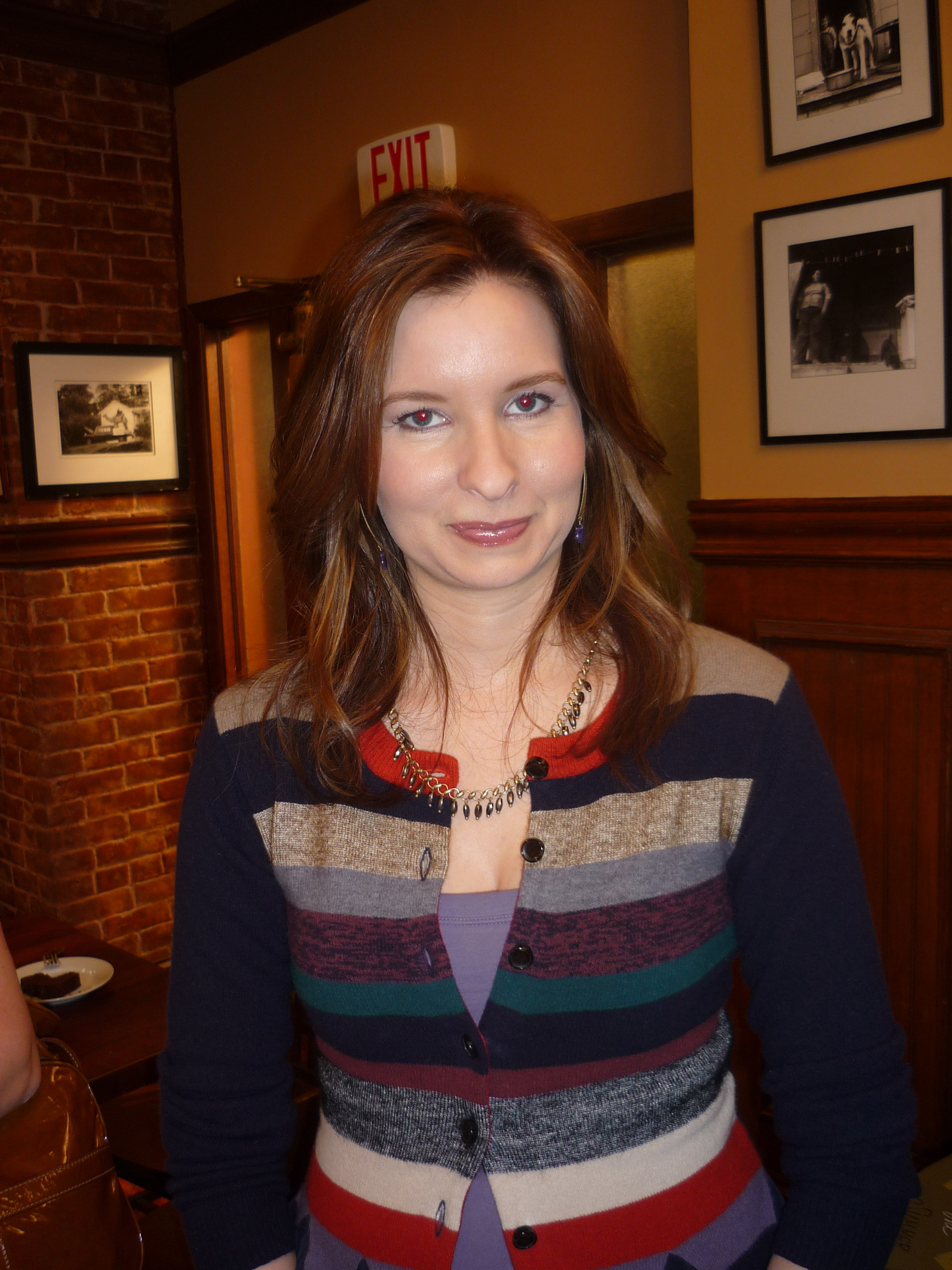
Several guest stars lent their voices to Adventure Time characters for the very first time this season, including Lauren Lapkus (left) and Lennon Parham (right).

In addition to the regular cast members, episodes feature guest voices from a range of professions, including actors, musicians, and artists. In the season opener "Broke His Crown", both Lena Dunham and Pamela Adlon reprise their characters Betty and Gunter the dinosaur. Dan Mintz, Henry Rollins, and Laura Silverman return to reprise their roles as T.V., Bob, and Ethel in "Lady Rainicorn of the Crystal Dimension". This episode also features former storyboard artist Bert Youn and comedian Fred Stoller voicing the rainicorns Lee and Roy. The episode "I Am a Sword" guest stars Amy Sedaris, Agee, and Melinda Hill; Sedaris plays Bandit Princess, Agee plays a Merchant and Science Cat, and Hill plays Space Bear and Sharon the spiky person. Storyline writer Ashly Burch plays Bun Bun in the titular episode, which also features Keith David reprising his role as the former Flame King. In "Elemental", Lauren Lapkus is introduced as the voice of ice elemental, Patience St. Pim. "Five Short Tables" sees the return of Madeleine Martin, Roz Ryan, Donald Glover, Grey DeLisle, and Emo Philips; they voice Fionna Campbell, Cake, Marshall Lee, Ice Queen, and Cuber. The episode also guest stars Hannibal Buress as Flame Prince, Crispin Freeman as Turtle Prince and Ice President, Keith Ferguson as Prince Gumball (standing in lieu of the character's original voice actor, Neil Patrick Harris, who was unavailable due to prior commitments), and Elle Newlands as Butterscotch Butler. "The Music Hole" features several guest actors, including Ashley Eriksson as the titular Music Hole, and Jackie Buscarino as Susan Strong. Alia Shawkat voices Charlie, Rich Sommer voices Grand Prix, and Reggie Watts voices the turtle announcer in "Daddy-Daughter Card Wars". "Preboot" sees the return of Buscarino as Susan Strong and Collin Dean as Tiffany; the episode also introduces Lennon Parham as Dr. Gross. Rainn Wilson reprises his role as Rattleballs, as well as voicing the adult version of Sparkle in "Reboot". The episode "Two Swords" introduces the character of Fern, voiced by Hayden Ezzy. The next episode, "Do No Harm", sees both Jeff Bennett and Hill reprise their roles as the Grass Wizard and Doctor Princess, respectively. In "Wheels", Marc Evan Jackson reprises his role as Kim Kil Whan, and Rae Gray guest stars as Jake's granddaughter, Bronwyn. Ron Lynch returns as Mr. Pig in "High Strangeness". "Horse & Ball" features British animator James Baxter, who voices the horse of the same name. Alan Tudyk returns to voice the character Chatsberry in "Jelly Beans Have Power". The Islands miniseries features Josh Fadem as Whipple the sea-dragon, Helena Mattsson as Alva, Reggie Watts as Vinny, Jasika Nicole as Frieda, Livvy Stubenrauch as young Kara/Susan, Sharon Horgan as Finn's mother Minerva, and Laraine Newman as the Widow. The miniseries also sees Lennon Parham reprise her role as Dr. Gross and Stephen Root return to voice Finn's father, Martin.

Other characters are voiced by Dee Bradley Baker, Maria Bamford, Steve Little, and Melissa Villaseñor.

== Broadcast and reception ==
=== Broadcast ===
Much like the sixth and seventh seasons, the eighth season of Adventure Time featured several "bomb" weeks, or weeks when new episodes debuted every day. The first of these began on January 23, 2017, with "Two Swords"/"Do No Harm" and concluded on January 27, 2017, with "Jelly Beans Have Power". The second week-long string of episodes occurred between January 30 and February 2, 2017, during which the whole of Islands aired.

=== Ratings ===
The season debuted on March 26, 2016, with the episode "Broke His Crown". It was watched by 1.13 million viewers and scored a 0.3 Nielsen rating in the 18 to 49-year-old demographic. Nielsen ratings are audience measurement systems that determine the audience size and composition of television programming in the United States. In this case the episode was seen by 0.3 percent of all households with viewers aged between 18 and 49 years old. This marked a slight decrease in viewership compared to the season seven finale, "The Thin Yellow Line", which was seen by 1.15 million individuals, but it marked a marginal increase compared to the previous season's premiere, "Bonnie & Neddy" which had 1.07 million viewers. The season concluded with the eight-part miniseries Islands. This string of episodes saw an uptick in viewers, with the first two episodes scoring a 0.3 Nielsen rating in the 18- to 49-year-old demographic and being watched by 1.2 million viewers. During the week that Islands aired, Adventure Time attained viewership numbers over 1 million for every episode. Despite this, "Islands Part 8: The Light Cloud" was still the lowest-rated finale for the show at the time of its airing.

=== Reviews and accolades ===
In a review for the episode "The Music Hole", The A.V. Club writer Oliver Sava wrote, "I love that after seven seasons the show hasn't lost sight of what makes it so compelling to such a wide audience." Each episode was also graded by The A.V. Club with a different letter grade; Islands received an A, and the rest of the season received nine B's, and nine A's. The A.V. Club did not review "Daddy-Daughter Card Wars" because episodic coverage of the series was intended to stop following the airing of "The Music Hole". However, after the airing of "Preboot" and "Reboot", their episode coverage returned due to popular demand.

Islands was met with mostly positive reviews. Many critics—such as Zack Smith of Newsarama and Oliver Sava of The A.V. Club—applauded how the miniseries started with quirky adventure episodes before culminating in an emotional finale. Other critics complimented the greater development of the miniseries' characters. Zach Blumenfeld of Paste Magazine complimented the miniseries' philosophical musings, which he argued "takes on shades of Black Mirror and existentialism to cast a critical eye on technology and the human spirit."

In April 2017, Common Sense Media awarded the Islands miniseries The Common Sense Seal, calling it a "beautiful animated miniseries [that] explores a deep backstory." In July 2017, the Islands episode "Imaginary Resources" won a Primetime Creative Arts Emmy Awards for Outstanding Individual Achievement in Animation at the 69th Primetime Creative Arts Emmy Awards.

== Episodes ==
No. overall	No. in season	Title	Supervising direction by	Written and storyboarded by	Original release date (Note: The Islands miniseries was released on DVD and made available for download on iTunes and Amazon.com on January 24. However, because this field specifically refers to episode airdates, the information here will denote when these eight episodes first aired on Cartoon Network.)	Prod. code	US viewers (millions)
226	1	"Broke His Crown"	Elizabeth Ito	Ako Castuera & Hanna K. Nyström	March 26, 2016	1034-234	1.13
While visiting the Ice King, Princess Bubblegum and Marceline notice he is acting stranger than usual. Bubblegum takes Ice King and his crown back to her laboratory, where she and Marceline enter the crown via virtual reality. They discover the crown is a maze, with circuitry running on its walls. There, they meet the original Gunther (voiced by Pamela Adlon). It is here that Marceline is reunited with Simon Petrikov who expresses his worries about what has been happening recently within the crown. The group discover a malware program, taking the form of a bodiless Betty, infecting the crown. Simon tries to get through to Betty to stop her from spreading it; he eventually succeeds, and the AI Betty is able to remember him and cease her alterations of the crown's circuitry. As such, the crown starts to reprogram to block access of foreign objects, and Marceline and Bubblegum are forced to leave. They return to the lab and take Ice King back to his kingdom—without him remembering a thing.
227	2	"Don't Look"	Elizabeth Ito	Somvilay Xayaphone & Seo Kim	April 2, 2016	1034-230	1.13
Finn unearths a treasure at the top of Dead Mountain—magical glasses. But these glasses come at a terrible price, for they turn those gazed upon into that which the wearer perceives them to be. Finn's gaze soon literally transforms Jake into a cooler older brother, BMO into a winged angel, Bubblegum into a "teenage boy heart-throb," the Ice King into Simon, and NEPTR into a microwave. Upon realizing that he turned NEPTR into an inanimate object, Finn breaks down and looks at himself in the mirror, which causes him to turn into an actual monster. Jake, however, is able to console his brother by telling him that, while Finn's eyes are bad at describing reality, his heart knows what is right. This breaks the spell and returns everything to normal.
228	3	"Beyond the Grotto"	Andres Salaff (Note: Seven minutes of this episode were animated and directed by Alex & Lindsay Small-Butera.)	Seo Kim & Somvilay Xayaphone	April 9, 2016	1034-235	1.06
Finn and Jake are tired of their sea lard, so they decide to throw it in the pond in front of their home. However, Shelby is quick to remind them sea lards can only survive in a salt water environment, so Finn and Jake dive in after the lard and attempt to save it. In so doing, they are led to a strange new world that superficially resembles Ooo, but is slightly off kilter. Eventually, Finn and Jake begin to forget who they are, and it is only the quick thinking of the sea lard that allows them to return to Ooo. In the end, Finn and Jake realize they were in the wrong for trying to get rid of their lard, and they allow it to live with them.
229	4	"Lady Rainicorn of the Crystal Dimension"	Elizabeth Ito	Graham Falk	April 16, 2016	1034-232	0.90
Jake's son TV (voiced by Dan Mintz) finds a hidden box containing a crystal sandwich. After eating it, TV draws attention from a Rainicorn named Lee (voiced by Bert Youn). Prior to her having arrived in Ooo, Lady Rainicorn had originally been in a relationship with Lee while living in the Crystal Dimension. Lee was adamantly anti-dog, and his increasingly radical and violent tendencies caused Lady to flee. In the present, it is revealed that the crystal sandwich is some sort of doomsday weapon, and only the combined efforts of Lady and TV are able to stop Lee from activating it and unleashing its power.
230	5	"I Am a Sword"	Andres Salaff	Jesse Moynihan & Sam Alden	April 23, 2016	1034-236	0.91
After Finn accidentally loses his Finn sword, it is stolen by Bandit Princess (voiced by Amy Sedaris) and used for evil. Finn and Jake pursue the thief, trailing her to both the Spikey Village and the Box Kingdom. It is here, in this last location, that Finn and Bandit Princess engage in a duel. While fighting, Finn's grass sword activates. With the grass sword, Finn accidentally pierces the hilt crystal of his Finn Sword, causing it to break. Finn becomes depressed, and Jake hangs up the broken Finn Sword above their fireplace. When the two are not looking, however, it begins to glow an eerie green color.
231	6	"Bun Bun"	Elizabeth Ito	Somvilay Xayaphone & Seo Kim	May 5, 2016	1034-240	1.01
Princess Bubblegum creates a small pastry named Bun Bun (voiced by Ashly Burch) to be Cinnamon Bun's squire. However, because Bun Bun is a veritable tabula rasa, she asks questions about everything. Cinnamon Bun eventually loses track of her, and she befriends the deposed Flame King (voiced by Keith David). He tries to use her as an instrument for evil, but her innocence eventually causes him to turn over a new leaf. Meanwhile, Finn apologizes to Flame Princess for his treatment of her before, during, and after their break-up. They make amends and begin to rebuild their relationship by engaging in a free-style rap battle.
232	7	"Normal Man"	Andres Salaff	Jesse Moynihan & Sam Alden	May 12, 2016	1034-241	1.38
Normal Man (voiced by Tom Kenny) asks for Finn and Jake's help to save his brother, Glob (voiced by Kenny) from Tiny Manticore (voiced by Kenny). Tiny Manticore, hoping to make Magic Man suffer for the years of abuse that he caused others to suffer, steals Glob's head away to a dangerous mountain, and Finn, Jake, and Magic Man give chase. Eventually, Tiny Manticore has a change of heart, allowing Glob and Normal Man to finally make amends. Normal Man then returns to Mars to ascend the Martian throne; at first, the Martians do not trust him (given his history), but eventually he is able to woo them with brownies.
233	8	"Elemental"	Elizabeth Ito	Kent Osborne	May 19, 2016	1034-242	1.17
Ice King digs up an ice sphere buried underneath the Ice Kingdom. Inside is Patience St. Pim (voiced by Lauren Lapkus), the ice elemental who has been asleep for a thousand years. She reveals that immediately prior to the Mushroom War, she froze herself to escape annihilation. Patience St. Pim reassembles the other elements—Princess Bubblegum, Slime Princess, and Flame Princess—and attempts to "get the band back together". However, the three captured princesses do not appreciate Patience St. Pim's aggressive style, and after she freezes Finn and Jake, they use their newfound elemental powers to overtake Patience St. Pim and escape.
234	9	"Five Short Tables"	Elizabeth Ito	Aleks Sennwald & Kris Mukai	May 26, 2016	1034-237	1.36
Ice King narrates several vignettes detailing Fionna (voiced by Madeleine Martin) and Cake's (voiced by Roz Ryan) adventures as they attempt to push Cake's cooking and artistic skills to an all-new level. Along the way, they interact with Prince Gumball (voiced by Keith Ferguson), Butterscotch Butler (voiced by Elle Newlands), Flame Prince (voiced by Hannibal Buress), Turtle Prince (voiced by Crispin Freeman), Marshall Lee (voiced by Donald Glover), Lumpy Space Prince, and Ice Queen (voiced by Grey DeLisle). In the end, it is revealed that the events of this episode are in turn being viewed by Cuber (voiced by Emo Philips).
235	10	"The Music Hole"	Andres Salaff	Polly Guo & Andres Salaff	June 23, 2016	1034-239	1.15
Finn, still despondent over the loss of his Finn Sword, is selected to be the judge of a battle of the bands. Almost everyone in Ooo takes part, but Finn becomes interested in a song that seemingly only he can hear. With Jake and Lady, Finn tracks down the source of the music: the titular Music Hole (voiced by Ashley Eriksson). The hole explains to Finn that its song can only be heard by either the innocent, or those who have experienced a great loss. After discussing the nature of loss and camaraderie, Finn declares the Hole to be the winner of the battle of the bands.
236	11	"Daddy-Daughter Card Wars"	Andres Salaff	Steve Wolfhard & Adam Muto	July 7, 2016	1034-238	1.16
Jake attempts to get his daughter Charlie (voiced by Alia Shawkat)—an expert tarot card reader—to team up with him to win a Card Wars competition. Jake is motivated by his desire to beat his former friend, Grand Prix (voiced by Rich Sommer). Charlie, meanwhile, only wants to obtain a bone from her father to cast a chaos magic spell. After seeing visions of her future self, Charlie decides to come to Jake's aid. The two make a formidable pair, but still end up losing to Grand Prix. However, Jake learns to live and let live, and his grudge dissipates.
237	12	"Preboot" (Part 1)	Adam Muto	Aleks Sennwald & Adam Muto	November 19, 2016	1034-243	0.77
During an excavation of human artifacts, Finn, Jake and Susan Strong (voiced by Jackie Buscarino) are greeted by a mysterious stranger named Dr. Gross (voiced by Lennon Parham) who lives in a subterranean ship. This enigmatic figure believes that nature can be "upgraded" via cybernetics. At first hospitable, Dr. Gross turns violent and antagonistic when Finn, Jake, and Susan decline to be upgraded. During the course of the episode, Dr. Gross discovers Susan's cybernetic implant, but is unable to activate it before her ship is destroyed.
238	13	"Reboot" (Part 2)	Elizabeth Ito	Tom Herpich & Steve Wolfhard	November 19, 2016	1034-244	0.77
After Finn accidentally causes Susan to be shocked, her cybernetic implant activates, She turns into a mindless drone and attempts to capture Finn. In the process, a chance blast of energy from a gumball guardian causes Susan to grow into a hulking monster. Finn and Susan eventually arrive along the shore, where they engage in a fight. During the fray, Finn's grass arm attempts to harm Susan, and Finn resists. It eventually detaches from his arm and merges with the broken Finn Sword, creating a mysterious grass-hybrid creature.
239	14	"Two Swords"	Cole Sanchez	Tom Herpich & Steve Wolfhard	January 23, 2017	1042-248	0.88
After Finn gets fitted with a new robotic arm by Princess Bubblegum, he recounts how the grass creature, dubbed Grass Finn (voiced by Hayden Ezzy), started to become aware to the point that it began to think it was the real Finn. Grass Finn is revealed to be a reborn version of the Finn Sword mixed with the remnants of the Grass Sword when it was pierced in "I Am a Sword". Finn appeals to Grass Finn's nature and decides to let it stay with him and Jake until it figures out what to do with itself.
240	15	"Do No Harm"	Cole Sanchez	Laura Knetzger & Lyle Partridge	January 23, 2017	1042-249	0.88
Finn heads to the Candy Kingdom hospital to check on Susan and ends up filling in for Doctor Princess. While things seem to be fine at first, it becomes apparent that Finn's doctor skills are amateur at best. Meanwhile, Jake and Grass Finn go searching for the Grass Wizard in hopes that he will discover meaning to his life. When it's revealed that Grass Wizard simply made him for fun, Grass Finn beats him up which lands him in the hospital. Grass Finn changes his name to Fern and leaves to travel Ooo and Susan finally awakens from her coma.
241	16	"Wheels"	Elizabeth Ito	Graham Falk & Charmaine Verhagen	January 24, 2017	1042-245	0.91
Kim Kil Whan asks Jake to find out why his daughter Bronwyn (voice by Rae Gray) is failing in class. Jake finds out that Bronwyn has been spending time at the skate park with her friends. Jake ends up showing off how cool he is, appeasing the skate park kids and embarrassing Bronwyn. Fed up with Jake, Bronwyn challenges him to a race which ends with Jake getting injured. Kim Kil Whan talks to Bronwyn and they both make up.
242	17	"High Strangeness"	Elizabeth Ito	Pendleton Ward & Sam Alden	January 25, 2017	1042-246	0.95
It is revealed that Tree Trunks has had alien children with extraterrestrials who visit her every couple of years or so. While attending Princess Bubblegum's launching of a small probe rocket, Tree Trunks' alien friends are hit by the probe and start to become infected by Bubblegum's gumlings. Tree Trunks discovers that Bubblegum has more probes and brings her aboard the aliens' ship to show what they have been doing. Bubblegum apologizes and retrieves the gumlings, revealing that she wanted to colonize other planets. The aliens agree to take her probe to an uninhabited planet.
243	18	"Horse and Ball"	Cole Sanchez	Somvilay Xayaphone & Seo Kim	January 26, 2017	1042-247	0.76
James Baxter's ball is destroyed making him unresponsive and depressed. Jake and BMO rush off to see Raggedy Princess who, after sympathizing with James Baxter's plight, gives Jake and BMO numerous beach balls. In flashback, it's revealed that James Baxter was a horse who came from a bustling grey city and found a beach ball while befriending a lonely bat. He reads the words "Games" and "Bookstore" as "James" and "Baxter" and goes off making people happy, but at the cost of losing his new friend. Finn attends to the depressed James Baxter and tells him to find what makes him happy. James Baxter rejects the beach balls and proceeds to dance for himself.
244	19	"Jelly Beans Have Power"	Cole Sanchez	Aleks Sennwald & Hanna K. Nyström	January 27, 2017	1042-250	0.91
After having tea with Slime Princess, Princess Bubblegum becomes jealous of her new elemental power. Bubblegum has a dream of meeting the Candy Elemental, Chapsberry (voiced by Alan Tudyk), who empowers her with the ability to fire jellybeans from her hands. Later, the Candy Kingdom is attacked by a large crystal fortune teller and Bubblegum jumps to the rescue. Her jellybeans do little to harm it, but after having visions from Chapsberry, Bubblegum uses her scientific mind to blow it up; however, her powers harm the citizens who now fear her. Meanwhile, it is revealed that the fortune teller was sent by Patience St. Pim who checks off a photo of Bubblegum.
245	20	"Islands Part 1: The Invitation"	Elizabeth Ito	Sam Alden & Polly Guo	January 30, 2017	1042-251	1.20
A large robotic craft arrives searching for Susan Strong. However, when it reaches the Candy Kingdom, Jake destroys it with his fist. Princess Bubblegum examines the wreckage and discovers its location of origin leading Finn wanting to discover its creators. Before leaving, Finn tells Fern to stay and look after Ooo for him. Princess Bubblegum, Marceline and Fern see Finn, Jake and Susan off on their voyage.
246	21	"Islands Part 2: Whipple the Happy Dragon"	Elizabeth Ito	Somvilay Xayaphone & Seo Kim	January 30, 2017	1042-252	1.20
Finn, Jake, and Susan encounter a sea dragon named Whipple (voiced by Josh Fadem) who turns out to be rather annoying. BMO, who stowed away on their boat, angrily tells Whipple off. BMO summons a storm and destroys their boat forcing Jake to fill in. Jake begins to hallucinate his parents after a species of jellyfish latch onto him, but Finn and Susan are able to fight them. After Jake complains about wanting to return home, Finn reveals how important this trip is to him. Whipple overhears Finn's lament and uses his powers to blow the group over the dangerous waters.
247	22	"Islands Part 3: Mysterious Island"	Cole Sanchez	Tom Herpich & Steve Wolfhard	January 31, 2017	1042-253	1.09
After an encounter with a colossus, Finn wakes up on an island where the weather drastically fluctuates. He encounters an old lady named Alva (voiced by Helena Mattsson) who does not speak English. Alva invites Finn to her home and shows her home movies of other humans who have presumably died. Later Finn, Alva and her pet bear encounter Jake who does not know the whereabouts of BMO and Susan. On the moon, BMO is being attended to by another robot and wishes that Finn, Jake and Susan could join her.
248	23	"Islands Part 4: Imaginary Resources"	Elizabeth Ito	Pendleton Ward & Graham Falk	January 31, 2017	1042-254	1.09
Finn and Jake head to a futuristic island where all of society has hooked themselves up to a virtual reality simulator. BMO is revealed to actually be in that simulation becoming a heroic leader along with his sidekick Vinny (voiced by Reggie Watts). Jake decides to go and destroy the generator powering the VR after BMO refuses to leave. Feeling bad for BMO, as well as the emaciated humans, Finn asks Jake to fix the generator, but BMO fixes it himself. BMO returns to Finn and Jake and they take a pod to the next island.
249	24	"Islands Part 5: Hide and Seek"	Elizabeth Ito	Aleks Sennwald & Hanna K. Nyström	February 1, 2017	1042-255	1.01
Finn, Jake and BMO find Susan who begins to have glimpses of her past. Susan, whose real name is Kara, is a seeker in training whose job is to bring those who try to flee from paradise. Kara is friends with Frieda (voiced by Jasika Nicole) who expresses the desire to flee which causes Kara some discomfort. She approaches Dr. Gross (voiced by Lennon Parham) asking if they can live off the island. When Dr. Gross convinces her that the outside is dangerous, they stop Frieda from leaving, dragging her away crying. Back in the present, Susan tells Finn her real name.
250	25	"Islands Part 6: Min & Marty"	Cole Sanchez	Kent Osborne & Sam Alden	February 1, 2017	1042-256	1.01
Kara decides to take Finn to Founders Island so that he can be reunited with his mother, Minerva Campbell (voiced by Sharon Horgan). Flashbacks detail how Minerva, a nurse, met Finn's father Martin Mertins (voiced by Stephen Root) when he was hospitalized after it was mistakenly believed he was attempting to leave the island with a group of escapees. Martin and Minerva fall in love and have Finn. When one of the attempted escapees, an elderly widow (voiced by Laraine Newman), seeks revenge on Martin, he flees on a boat with Finn. When the colossus attacks their craft, the pair are separated, leaving Finn to drift away. The widow is arrested and Minerva is heartbroken over Martin and Finn's disappearance.
251	26	"Islands Part 7: Helpers"	Elizabeth Ito	Tom Herpich & Steve Wolfhard	February 2, 2017	1042-257	1.00
The group make it to Founders Island where humans have been living in relative peace. While Kara is distracted by Frieda, Finn and Jake discover that the island is full of Minerva look-alike robots called "helpers". They are brought to the real Minerva—a digitized consciousness—when Finn is identified as her son. Minerva reveals that she had Dr. Gross send Kara to retrieve Finn, but years had passed and Dr. Gross accidentally released a deadly virus that was killing humans. Minerva had her essence uploaded into a computer, and then created the helpers to prolong the human race. But now that Finn is here with her, she expresses her desire that he stay permanently.
252	27	"Islands Part 8: The Light Cloud"	Cole Sanchez	Graham Falk, Aleks Sennwald, & Adam Muto	February 2, 2017	1042-258	1.00
While Susan makes amends with Frieda, Finn tries to convince Minerva that life off the island isn't bad, but Minerva thinks it's dangerous. Finn then tries to convince the humans to leave and they all rally alongside him. Minerva tries to upload the consciousnesses of all the islands' inhabitants, so Finn shares with her his memories of helping people, causing her to back down. The humans all change their minds about leaving, except for Frieda. With Minerva's help, they defeat the colossus and Susan and Frieda leave for parts unknown. Finn has one final talk with Minerva through the VR headset before returning to Ooo with Jake and BMO.

== Home media ==
Warner Home Video released several DVD compilations that contain episodes from the eighth season. The first was Card Wars, released on July 12, 2016. The second release, Islands—which included all of the titular miniseries—was released on DVD on January 24, 2017. This release was notable because it marked the second time that Adventure Time episodes had been released on DVD before officially airing on Cartoon Network. The first instance was the release of the episode "Princess Day" on the DVD of the same name on July 29, 2014, before it first aired on TV on July 31, 2014).

=== US release ===
A DVD set that includes season eight along with seasons nine and ten was released in the United States on September 4, 2018.

Adventure Time: The Final Seasons
Set details
Special features
- Seasons 8–10
- 58 episodes
- 1.78:1 aspect ratio
- Subtitles: English
- English (Dolby Stereo)
- Animatics
- Song demoes
- Character art gallery
- Behind the scenes featurette
Release dates
Region 1
Region 4
Region A
Region B
September 4, 2018
TBA
TBA
TBA

=== Australian release ===
On November 28, 2018, the season was released by itself on DVD and Blu-ray in Australia.

Adventure Time: The Complete Eighth Season
Set details
Special features
- Season 8
- 27 episodes
- 1.78:1 aspect ratio
- Subtitles: English
- English (Dolby stereo)
- TBA
Release dates
Region 1
Region 4
Region A
Region B
N/A
November 28, 2018
N/A
November 28, 2018
