= Grand Prix Velo Alanya =

Grand Prix Velo Alanya is the name of two cycling races:

- Grand Prix Velo Alanya (men's race)
- Grand Prix Velo Alanya (women's race)
