= Motorcycle (disambiguation) =

A motorcycle is a single-track two-wheeled motor vehicle. It is also known as a motorbike.

Motorcycle may also refer to:

- The Motor Cycle, a British publication
- Motorcycles (film), a 1949 Czech film
- Motorcycle (band), an electronic dance music project
- MotorCycle, a 1993 album by rock band Daniel Amos
- Motor-Cycle (album), an album by Lotti Golden on Atlantic Records
- "Motorcycle", a song by The Rumble Strips

== See also ==
- Electric motorcycle, vehicles with two or three wheels that use electric motors to attain locomotion
- Moped, a class of low-powered motorized vehicles, generally with two wheels
- Motorized bicycle, a bicycle with an attached motor used to assist with pedalling
- Motor scooter, a two-wheeled motorized vehicle with a step-through frame
- Motorized tricycle, similar to a motorcycle, but with three wheels
