= Normal Man =

- Adventure Time episode
- Episode no.: Season 8 Episode 7
- Directed by: Andres Salaff (Note: Supervising director); Sandra Lee (Note: Art director)
- Written by: Sam Alden; Jesse Moynihan
- Story by: Ashly Burch; Jesse Moynihan; Adam Muto; Jack Pendarvis; Kent Osborne
- Production code: 1034-241
- Original air date: May 12, 2016
- Running time: 11 minutes

Guest appearances
- Melissa Villaseñor as Grob; Justin Roiland as Lemongrab

Episode chronology
← Previous "Bun Bun"	Next → "Elemental"
- Adventure Time season 8

"Normal Man" is the seventh episode of the eighth season of the American animated television series Adventure Time. The episode was written and storyboarded by Sam Alden and Jesse Moynihan, from an outline by Ashly Burch, Moynihan, showrunner Adam Muto, Jack Pendarvis, and head writer Kent Osborne. The episode, which debuted on May 12, 2016 on Cartoon Network, guest stars Melissa Villaseñor as Grob and Justin Roiland as Lemongrab.

The series follows the adventures of Finn (voiced by Jeremy Shada), a human boy, and his best friend and adoptive brother Jake (voiced by John DiMaggio), a dog with magical powers to change shape and grow and shrink at will. In this episode, Normal Man (voiced by Tom Kenny) asks for Finn and Jake's help in order to save his brother, Glob (voiced by Kenny). Eventually, Glob and Normal Man are able to make amends, and Normal Man returns to Mars to ascend the Martian throne.

"Normal Man" was the final episode of Adventure Time to have been storyboarded by Moynihan. Initially, he contemplated working on the episode alone, but Muto convinced him otherwise. The original story that Moynihan developed was much darker, but eventually a lighter plot was agreed upon. Upon its airing, the episode was seen by 1.38 million viewers and received largely positive reviews from critics, with Oliver Sava of The A.V. Club applauding the episode's consideration of forgiveness.

== Plot ==
=== Background ===
Hundreds of years before the events of the series, Magic Man (voiced by Tom Kenny) was a brilliant magician and scientist from Mars. However, after a magical accident, he lost his mind and developed the nihilistic tendency to spread chaos. As such, he was banished to Earth by the King of Mars (voiced by Pendleton Ward) and Magic Man's four-headed brother, Grob Gob Glob Grod (whose heads are voiced respectively by Melissa Villaseñor, Tom Gammill, Kenny, and Miguel Ferrer). In the "Astral Plane", Grob Gob Glob Grod sacrificed their body to stop a comet from destroying Mars, leaving the planet rulerless. Later, in the episode, "You Forgot Your Floaties", another magical accident removed the magic, madness, and sadness from Magic Man's warped brain, reverting him to his original self. However, since he can no longer perform magic, he takes on the moniker Normal Man.

=== Events ===
Normal Man is determined to make amends with his brother Glob, whose head is currently in orbit around Earth, so he sends Tiny Manticore (voiced by Kenny) to retrieve his brother from space. Upon successfully retrieving Glob, Tiny Manticore reveals to Normal Man that he is going to steal the head away to a dangerous mountain so as to make Normal Man suffer for all the pain he inflicted in the past. Normal Man is despondent and calls on the aid of Finn and Jake.

The trio brave the terrors of the mountain, and successfully reach its summit, only for Tiny Manticore to drop Glob from the peak. Normal Man dives after his brother and grabs him; as they free-fall, the two make amends. Tiny Manticore sees that Normal Man has indeed changed, and so he saves the two. Normal Man, grasping the head of Glob, then uses a Martian transporter to beam themselves to Mars. En route, Glob bites Normal Man's hand, causing him to drop the head. Glob says that the days of Mars being ruled by Grob Gob Glob Grod are over, and that it is time for Normal Man to rule the planet.

Once on Mars, Normal Man attempts to woo the terrified citizens of the planet with brownies. They do not trust him at first, but it is suggested that they embrace him as their leader.

== Production ==
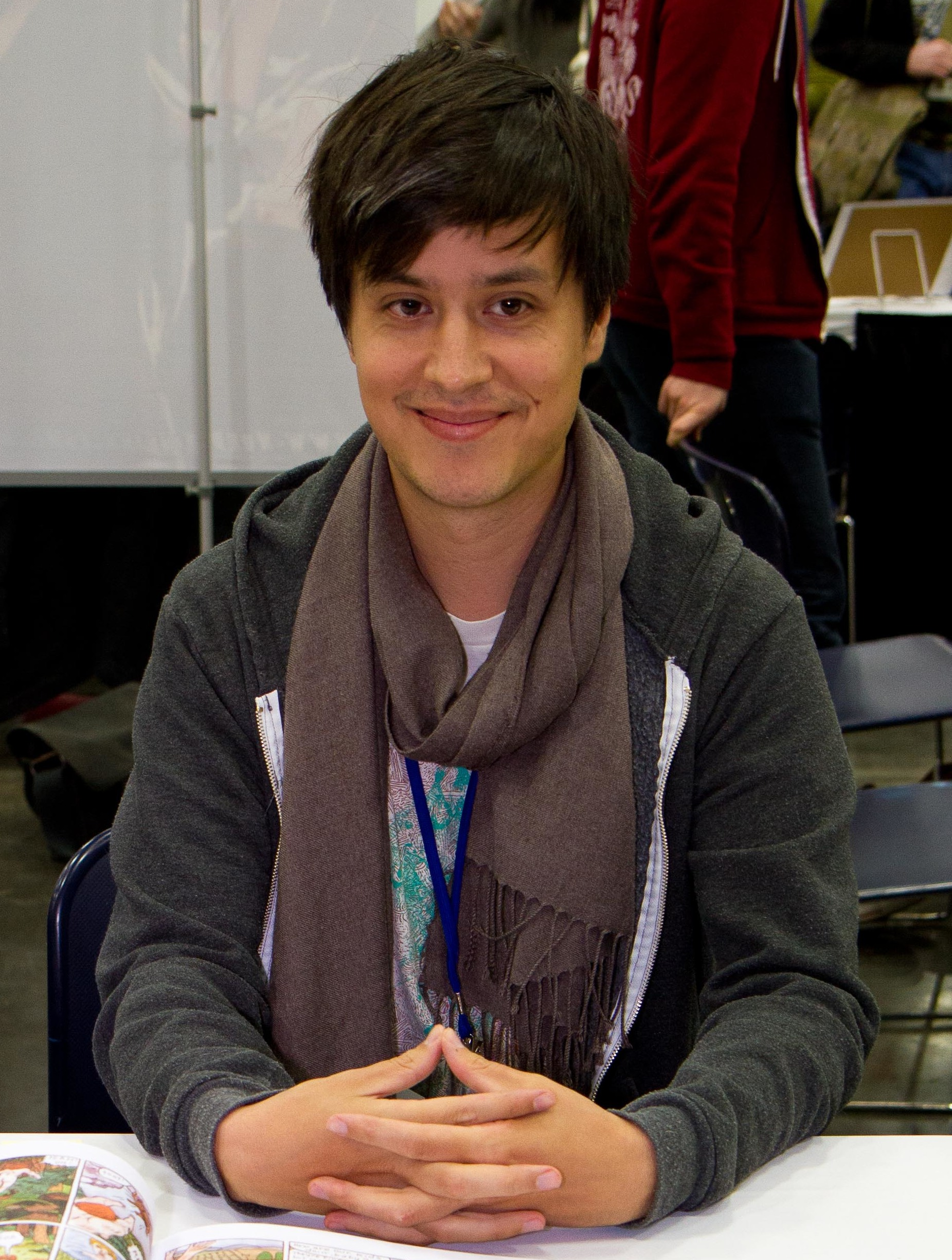
This was the final episode of Adventure Time to have been storyboarded by Jesse Moynihan.

"Normal Man" was storyboarded by Sam Alden and Jesse Moynihan, from a story by Ashly Burch, Moynihan, Adam Muto, Jack Pendarvis, and Kent Osborne. Supervising direction for the episode was carried out by Andres Salaff, whereas Sandra Lee handled the episode's art direction. This was the final episode of Adventure Time that Moynihan worked on. Moynihan, who had been a storyboard artist on the show since the second season episode "Crystals Have Power", left the show in order to finish his web comic Forming. Alden noted that the episode was "a thematically appropriate cap to [Moynihan's] run on" the series, and that the two of them "were both happy with how it turned out." Moynihan had originally thought about storyboarding the episode by himself, but Muto convinced him otherwise, for near the conclusion of season six, Moynihan had specifically asked Muto to persuade him against pursuing solo storyboards in the future. Ultimately, Moynihan felt that storyboarding the episode with Alden was a good choice, and on his personal website, he mused that "Normal Man" was the best episode that he and Alden produced together.

Because this was going to be his last episode, Moynihan desired to help come up with the story. Originally, he wanted it to be much darker, and focus on Magic Man, Margles (Magic Man's former wife, voiced by Gillian Jacobs), and Betty (Simon Petrikov's fiancée, voiced by Lena Dunham in seasons five and six and Felicia Day in season nine). Hoping to distance himself from the dark tone that characterized season six, however, he chose to pursue a different story about Magic Man being forced to live as a "normie" and eventually reclaiming the Martian throne.

In this episode, Tom Kenny plays the roles of Normal Man, Tiny Manticore, and Glob. Series creator Pendleton Ward also voices Lumpy Space Princess, as well as Abraham Lincoln. Finally, the episode guest stars Melissa Villaseñor as Grob, and Justin Roiland as Lemongrab.

== Reception ==
"Normal Man" aired on May 12, 2016. It was seen by 1.38 million viewers and scored a 0.4 Nielsen rating in the 18- to 49-year-old demographic (Nielsen ratings are audience measurement systems that determine the audience size and composition of television programming in the United States), which means that the episode was seen by 0.4 percent of all individuals aged 18 to 49 years old who were watching television at the time of the episode's airing.

Oliver Sava of The A.V. Club compared this episode favorably to the preceding eighth season episode “Bun Bun”, pointing out that the two installments deal with characters making amends for past wrongs. This in turn led him to note, "People's capacity for change has been a recurring theme of Adventure Time's [eighth] season, and it's a big reason why the show has maintained such a high standard of quality." Sava was also complimentary towards the scenes that take place on the mountain, likening them to “one long platformer [video game] with a bunch of really cool opponents.”

Andrew Tran of Overmental noted that because Magic Man had been a representation for "the cruel randomness of waking life, the tragedy of bad things happening senselessly to good people", there is a certain irony in the fact that Normal Man suffers so much in this episode. The suffering that Normal Man must endure is a direct response to his previous actions as Magic Man, and so he goes on a "'holy mountain'-style ordeal" to spiritually renew himself and cleanse himself of the "original sin" that he technically did not commit (for it must be remembered that Magic Man's personality and behavior was engendered by magical accident), but for which he nonetheless must pay. In the end, "Normal Man prove[s] his sincerity, and so inherit[s] the Earth (or more precisely, Mars)."
