= Adventure Time: The Secret of the Nameless Kingdom =

2014 video game

- European box art
- Developer: WayForward Technologies
- Publisher: Little Orbit
- Directors: Tomm Hulett; James Maxwell
- Producer: Ryan Rucinski
- Designers: Tomm Hulett; Kyle Bardiau; Brody Brooks; Dwight Spaulding
- Programmer: Walter Hecht
- Artists: Dallas Robinson; Jason Wright
- Writers: Pendleton Ward; Tomm Hulett
- Composers: Keiji Yamagishi; Eirik Suhrke; Chipzel; Monomirror; Ian Stocker
- Series: Adventure Time
- Platforms: PlayStation 3 Xbox 360; Windows; Nintendo 3DS; PlayStation Vita
- Release: NA: November 18, 2014; EU: November 27, 2014; AU: November 20, 2014
- Genres: Action-adventure, role-playing
- Mode: Single-player

Adventure Time: The Secret of the Nameless Kingdom is a 2014 action-adventure role-playing game developed by WayForward Technologies and published by Little Orbit for PlayStation 3, Xbox 360, Windows, Nintendo 3DS, and PlayStation Vita. It is the third game based on the animated television series Adventure Time, following Hey Ice King! Why'd You Steal Our Garbage?!! (2012) and Explore the Dungeon Because I Don't Know! (2013).

The game's plot takes Finn and Jake to discover secrets through uncharted territories within the Land of Ooo.

The game was delisted from digital storefronts on March 31, 2018, due to licensing issues. However, the Xbox 360 version was made backwards-compatible on both the Xbox One and Xbox Series X and S on November 15, 2021. The Xbox 360 version was relisted on the Xbox Games Store on November 30, 2021.

== Gameplay ==
Secret of the Nameless Kingdom plays similarly to top-down entries of The Legend of Zelda series, particularly The Legend of Zelda: A Link to the Past; various elements such as dungeon crawling, sword-based combat, explodeable walls, etc., carry over from Link to the Past to Secret of the Nameless Kingdom.

The main goal of the game is to rescue 3 princesses of the Nameless Kingdom, each residing in their own temple. After rescuing the third princess, Nightmare Princess, the player must then tackle a final dungeon and defeat Nightmare Princess to end the game.

== Plot ==
The game begins with Finn camping in the rain. He hears the voice of Jake who tells him to venture into a nearby castle dungeon. Jake then reveals he was inside Finn's pocket, and as the two venture through the tutorial dungeon, Finn and Jake recall that they were sent to the kingdom they're currently in, the Nameless Kingdom, on an important mission by Princess Bubblegum. Eventually reaching the castle's main hall, Finn and Jake encounter a butler who informs them of their quest: they must rescue the 3 princesses of the kingdom in preparation for the upcoming coronation.

Finn and Jake rescue the first two princesses, Lullaby and Slumber Princess, relatively easily. However, the third princess, Nightmare Princess, reveals after being rescued that she is the reason why the princesses have gone missing, and takes over the entirety of the Nameless Kingdom, declaring it the Nightmare Kingdom. Finn and Jake must then venture into the castle once again, then fight Nightmare Princess. After defeating her, they are presented with the choice of whom to crown the ruler of the Nameless Kingdom, which was their assignment all along. Selecting Lullaby or Slumber Princess results in a unique "side" ending, but selecting Nightmare Princess is the true ending.

== Development ==
The game was announced on May 8, 2014. It was the last console Adventure Time game developed by WayForward Technologies and the first game in the series from American publisher Little Orbit. The game's director, Tomm Hulett, stated during a Q&A on Reddit, that he wanted to take all the negative feedback that they received for Hey Ice King! Why'd You Steal Our Garbage?!! and Explore the Dungeon Because I Don't Know!, which he also directed, in order to make the "ultimate AT game". The game's soundtrack was produced by Brave Wave Productions and was a collaborative work between Keiji Yamagishi, Eirik Suhrke, Niamh "Chipzel" Houston, Marco "Monomirror" Guardia and Ian Stocker. Composer Jake Kaufman also contributed a single piece of music, which was recycled from Explore the Dungeon Because I Don't Know!.

== Reception ==
Reception

Aggregate score
Aggregator	Score
Metacritic	(3DS) 65/100 (X360) 58/100

Review scores
Publication	Score
GameSpot	6/10
Nintendo Life	7/10 (3DS)
Hardcore Gamer	3/5
Gaming Age	A−

The game received mixed reviews. Hardcore Gamer gave the game a 3 out of 5, saying "Wayforward has scraped by with The Secret of the Nameless Kingdom. Its inspirations are pure, and give birth to some solid if all-too-familiar mechanics, but it's ultimately a disappointing adventure that squanders source material that remains begging for a true video game adaptation." GameSpot gave it a 6 out of 10, comparing the game favorably to The Legend of Zelda: A Link to the Past and saying that "provides a similarly satisfying experience on a smaller scale", but criticizing the weak dialogue and lack of direction in the overworld. Nintendo Life gave a positive review, questioning the graphics in the 3DS version, but calling the game "a highly enjoyable experience and is definitely the strongest game in the series to date."
