= Mighty Flip Champs! =

2009 video game

- Developer: WayForward Technologies
- Publisher: WayForward Technologies: JP: Intergrow
- Director: Matt Bozon
- Designers: Matt Bozon; Mark Bozon
- Programmers: Chris Losorelli (DSIWare); Michael Clasgens (PlayStation Minis)
- Artists: Matt Bozon; Jason Robinson
- Composer: Jake Kaufman
- Series: Mighty
- Platforms: Nintendo DSi (DSiWare); PlayStation Portable
- Release: DSiWare: NA: June 1, 2009; PAL: November 27, 2009; JP: April 30, 2014; PlayStation Portable: NA: July 12, 2011
- Genre: Puzzle-platform
- Mode: Single-player

Mighty Flip Champs! is a puzzle-platform game developed and published by WayForward Technologies for the Nintendo DSi's DSiWare digital download service. It was released on June 1, 2009, in North America and on November 27 in the PAL regions. The developers took inspiration from multiple sources, including the video games Wendy: Every Witch Way and The Legend of Zelda: A Link to the Past. In it, players control Alta, a girl who has to reach a fishman by flipping between areas until she can reach him. Since its release, Mighty Flip Champs! received all-around positive reception, while also being called one of the best video games for the DSiWare service. It is the first game in the Mighty series, and is followed by Mighty Milky Way, Mighty Switch Force! and Mighty Switch Force! 2.

The game has been ported to PlayStation 3 and PlayStation Portable via the PlayStation Network as a PlayStation Mini under the title Mighty Flip Champs! DX. It was released in North America on July 12, 2011.

== Gameplay ==
Screenshot of Mighty Flip Champs!. The top and bottom screen act as two different areas, that the player-character is simultaneously walking on.

Mighty Flip Champs! is a puzzle/platform game hybrid, requiring players to explore stages that vary from having two areas to up to eight areas. The objective is to get the player-character, Alta, through the stage and to find the Fishman. Later in the game, levels will add characters that Alta must find before she may exit the stage. Alta has only two abilities: movement and flipping. Movement requires use of the Nintendo DS' directional pad, allowing Alta to move only left or right. The player controls Alta on the top screen, with another area being shown on the bottom screen with a mirror image of Alta shown. Players are able to flip to a different screen by pushing a button. When these screens are flipped, the area on the bottom screen will appear on the top screen; depending on the number of areas, the top area will be moved to the bottom area, or a new area will be revealed. If Alta does not have any footing to land on, she will fall, though uninjured. If there is an obstacle in the way while flipping, she will lose and the level will end. Some special stages exist where Alta cannot flip the screen, and is at the whim of a clock which flips the screen every so often. Once a stage is completed, the players are shown their time and an accompanying rank, the highest being an "S".

== Development ==
Mighty Flip Champs! was announced in March 2009 for the Nintendo DSi's DSiWare download service. It was developed by WayForward Technologies, using only five developers, the lead designer being Matt Bozon. It was designed for the sake of taking advantage of the Nintendo DS' features, though scaled to work with the DSiWare. Initially, the developers were contemplating the inclusion of enemies and items. They chose to leave enemies out of the game, feeling that if they had enemies, it would make the game too complicated. However, Matt commented that if players responded well to the game, they may implement enemies in a clever way next time. While the difficulty level was not designed to cater to younger or inexperienced players, the developers designed earlier levels to be more forgiving. They had younger players play it, and were surprised as to how far they could make it through. One of the developers, Mark Bozon, commented that it was as difficult to create the levels as it was for players to beat them, adding that they have to build the concept, account for player movements, and then ensure that players cannot exploit any mistakes in the level design.

The developers used very little storage space in developing the game, attributing this to the small sprites, which allowed them to have improved audio and cutscenes. The developers took inspiration from multiple other video games, such as Wendy: Every Witch Way, which was developed by Mark and Matt Bozon, the former describing Mighty Flip Champs! as a spiritual successor to it. They also took inspiration from The Legend of Zelda: A Link to the Past for the idea of dimension traveling. Mark called it the "grand daddy" of the concept. Development took a total of two months, while testing and the publishing process taking a month. It was released in North America on June 1, 2009, and in the PAL regions on November 27, for the price of 800 DSi Points. The developers described Mighty Flip Champs! as a way to gauge fan interest in the possibility of a Shantae sequel for the DSiWare, in order to see how well it could perform. A sequel to Shantae was later announced and released for the DSiWare service, titled Shantae: Risky's Revenge. When asked if they would ever use the DSiWare service's ability to add new content to games, Matt stated that he would rather do a sequel with new ideas. Mark concurred, adding that if they have the time, money, and fan support, he would like to do a sequel, stating that they have some great ideas for it.

== Reception ==
Reception

Aggregate score
| Aggregator | Score | | |
| Aggregator | DS | PS3 | PSP |
|---|---|---|---|
| Metacritic | 83/100 | 80/100 | 90/100 |

Review scores
| Publication | Score | | |
| Publication | DS | PS3 | PSP |
|---|---|---|---|
| Edge | 8/10 | N/A | N/A |
| GamePro | N/A | 4/5 | N/A |
| IGN | 8.5/10 | N/A | N/A |
| Nintendo Life | 9/10 | N/A | N/A |
| Official Nintendo Magazine | 85% | N/A | N/A |
| PSM3 | N/A | N/A | 90% |
| Teletext GameCentral | 8/10 | N/A | N/A |

Mighty Flip Champs! and the PlayStation 3 version of Mighty Flip Champs! DX received "favorable" reviews, while the PSP version received "universal acclaim", according to the review aggregation website Metacritic. On June 10, 2009, Mighty Flip Champs! ranked ninth on the top 20 best-selling DSiWare games of that week. It stayed at that ranking in the week of June 17, falling to 13th on the week of June 25. It ranked at 18 on July 2, and its last appearance on the list was on July 9 in the 20th place.

Official Nintendo Magazine praised it as a "charming, addictive and original addition to the growing DSiWare library". IGN praised the DS version's unique design and retro style, describing it as a top notch package and highly recommended. They also gave it their "Editor's Choice" award. Edge described the same DS version as being both a "cold study in design brilliance" and a "speed-runner's dream" in certain points, comparing it to video game developer Treasure's Gunstar Heroes. Nintendo Life praised both the overall quality of the gameplay as well as describing the music and artwork as high quality.

Mighty Flip Champs! was nominated for multiple awards and listed as one of the best DSiWare games by several publications. Nintendo Life named it the runner-up for best DSiWare game of 2009, GamesRadar+ included it as one of the best DSiWare games, calling it an interesting puzzler and one of the most ambitious titles on the DSiWare. In 2011, IGN ranked it as the 13th best DSiWare game, calling it one of the first must-have games for the service. Mighty Flip Champs! was a nominee for best downloadable game of 2009 by GameSpy.
