= Mighty Switch Force! =

Video game series by WayForward

- Key art
- Genre: Puzzle-platform
- Developer: WayForward
- Publisher: WayForward Technologies: JP: Intergrow
- Creators: Matt Bozon; Austin Ivansmith (Hyper Drive Edition)
- Artists: Matt Bozon; Michael Herbster; Austin Ivansmith (Hyper Drive Edition)
- Platforms: Nintendo 3DS, Nintendo Switch, PlayStation 4, Windows, Xbox One
- First release: Mighty Switch Force! December 22, 2011
- Latest release: Mighty Switch Force! Collection; July 25, 2019

Mighty Switch Force! is a series of puzzle-platform games developed and published by WayForward Technologies. It is a sub-series within WayForward's broader Mighty series of games, with the first Mighty Switch Force! title being the third Mighty game, following Mighty Flip Champs! and Mighty Milky Way.

Mighty Switch Force! centers around Patricia "Patty" Wagon, a cybernetic "peace keeper" who lives on Planet Land. Each game deals with Patty encountering the Hooligan Sisters, a group of all-female criminals, either to apprehend them, as a police officer, or to save them, as a firefighter. Direct in-game narrative storytelling is minimal, with most of its storytelling being fed to the player though gameplay components, in-game visual stills and official game descriptions.

The first game has been labelled a "sleeper hit", which spawned its own series of independently recognized games. Consequently, Mighty Switch Force! has become one of WayForward's core, most recognizable IPs. Patty is recognized as a key WayForward heroine.

== Gameplay ==
The player controls a cybernetic woman named Patricia "Patty" Wagon who is either a police officer of fire fighter, depending on the entry.

The goal of each level is to find all of the Hooligan Sister and return to the exit point as quickly as possible, with each level possessing a Par Time that dedicated speed runners can try to beat. Along with the ability to jump and shoot, Patty is able to push in and out blocks dotted around the stage with her "Siren Helmet", using them as platforms or a means to destroy certain enemies. There are also various other types of blocks such as launcher blocks that send Patty or an enemy in a certain direction and colored blocks that allow the player to change which plane they switch on. During each level, the player has three hearts called "Heart Drives", with the player losing one heart if Patty is hurt by an enemy, comes into contact with spikes or is pushed into the screen by a block change (checkpoints created allow Patty to respawn at that point in the case of the latter two). If Patty loses all three hearts, she will have to start the level over. Throughout the level she can collect floppy disks which restore hearts, either by finding them, or from shooting enemies.

== Characters ==
Patricia "Patty" Wagon (voiced by Stephanie Komure): A "cybernetic peace-keeper" who lives in Tangent City, on Planet Land. Patty wears a "Siren Helmet", which can control the various blocks around Planet Land. Patty is depicted as an energetic and righteous hero who is determined to uphold law and peace. A recurring gag is revelations about Patty's cyborg-looking design, and the true nature of her body. It has been revealed over the course of the games that she is a fully cybernetic android who looks like a regular woman, and is typically garbed in futuristic-looking peace-keeper attire. She is either a police officer or a firefighter depending on the game. Patty is the only voiced character in the series, voiced by the actor Stephanie Komure, providing dialogue during levels. Patty's quote, "Stop, in the name of the law!", which is one of her quotes during levels, as well as being shouted by her in the first game's opening, has become something of an infamous, representative quote.

Hooligan Sisters: The Hooligan Sisters are a notorious group of quintuplet blonde criminals, that Patty encounters in every game. There are five of them with distinct designs that highlight differing character types. They are only officially referred to as Hooligan Sisters 1-5 or A-E, although have the commonly used fanon names of Bubbles, Joanna, Rocky, Scarlet, and Sandy. In Mighty Switch Force! 2 they appear as reformed civilians. In Mighty Switch Force! Academy, two of the sisters, "A" and "C", appear to attend the same police academy as Patty.

=== Other characters ===
- General Gendarmora: A mechanical suit of armor that aides Patty and extracts her from levels.
- Ugly Twitching Dog (U.T.D): Patty's service animal that creates checkpoints for Patty.
- Ugly Secret Baby (U.S.B): A secret baby found in Mighty Switch Force! 2 who Patty "rescues" from fires by kicking it. Patty 'righteously' kicking babies is a dark comedy joke that carried over into Mighty Switch Force! Academy where she can kick bombs made to resemble babies.

== Main titles ==
=== Mighty Switch Force! ===
The first game was released on the Nintendo eShop on December 22, 2011. An update to the game, including five new levels, was released in May 2012. A high-definition version, Mighty Switch Force! Hyper Drive Edition, was released for the Wii U in 2012, featuring re-drawn graphics and other new features. A Steam version of the game was also released in June 2015.

==== Plot ====
A group of convicts called the "Hooligan Sisters" escape custody on Planet Land. As they escape, one of them breaks open a canister, which causes Planet Land to become infested with monsters. The "Galactic Penal Squad" contacts "cybernetic peace officer" Patricia "Patty" Wagon, authorizing the use of her Siren Helmet and Pellet Shooter, in order to capture the criminals. Helping her along the way are General Gendarmor, a mechanical armor that can extract her from battles, Ugly Twitching Dog (U.T.D), who can create reload points, and HQ, who are monitoring her actions.

After travelling across Planet Land, Patty confronts a giant purple monster, which has trapped the Hooligan Sisters. She defeats it, rescuing the Hooligan Sisters, after which Patty arrests them all.

Post-credits, Patty is shown stripped down to gym clothes.

==== Development ====
The first game was released for the Nintendo eShop on December 22, 2011. A free update to the game was released in May 2012, featuring five new levels, improved 3D effects and the option to restart the level. In the same year, WayForward developed Mighty Switch Force! Hyper Drive Edition as a downloadable title for the Wii U. The game features redrawn graphics similar in style to A Boy and His Blob, and also features off-screen game play with the Wii U GamePad, as well as the downloadable content from the Nintendo 3DS update. New to this version of the game is also the inclusion of Hyper Mode levels, which remaster all previous levels making them even harder. The game was released in conjunction with Wii U's American launch on November 18, and in Europe on December 6.

==== Reception ====
Reception

Aggregate score
Aggregator	Score		
Aggregator	3DS	PC	Wii U
Metacritic	79/100	85/100	80/100

Review scores
Publication	Score		
Publication	3DS	PC	Wii U
1Up.com	A−	N/A	N/A
Destructoid	8.5/10	N/A	9/10
Edge	7/10	N/A	N/A
Eurogamer	8/10	N/A	N/A
GamesMaster	75%	N/A	60%
GameZone	N/A	N/A	8/10
IGN	8/10	N/A	8.5/10
Nintendo Life	9/10	N/A	9/10
Nintendo World Report	8/10	N/A	9/10
Official Nintendo Magazine	86%	N/A	65%
The A.V. Club	B	N/A	N/A
Metro	8/10	N/A	N/A

The fight game received "favorable" reviews on all platforms according to the review aggregation website Metacritic. IGN praised the 3DS version's gameplay and presentation but criticized its short length.

=== Mighty Switch Force! 2 ===
Main article: Mighty Switch Force! 2

=== Mighty Switch Force! Academy ===
The third entry in the trilogy which was released on November 23, 2015, for Steam.

The gameplay borrows heavily from the first Mighty Switch Force! following the same game formula, however the key difference is that the entire level is now zoomed out and displayed as one screen. This allows for various new gameplay quirks for level solving, such as the ability to fall out of one side of the screen and end up at the opposite side. The game is also the first to both have, and be largely built around, the inclusion of multiplayer, although it can also be played single-player as well.

==== Plot ====
Academy is a prequel to Mighty Switch Force! that is set during Patty's training days at the Planet Land Police Academy. During training, Patty's training module goes haywire and loses all its safety protocols, leaving Patty to try and arrest simulated versions of the notorious criminals, the Hooligan Sisters, armed with her pellet shooter (two of the Hooligan Sisters are shown attending the same academy). At the end of the game, Patty manages to escape the module after defeating a final boss, after which "Ugly Secret Baby" from Mighty Switch Force! 2 falls out of the module.

==== Reception ====
The game had little fanfare upon its initial release, and sold in poor numbers. Academy was praised for its inclusion in Mighty Switch Force! Collection for bringing a unique multiplayer experience to the collection, although reception to it as an entry in the series was mixed.

== Mighty Switch Force! Collection ==
A collection titled Mighty Switch Force! Collection, which includes Mighty Switch Force!, Mighty Switch Force! 2, Mighty Switch Force! Hyper Drive Edition and Mighty Switch Force! Academy was released for Microsoft Windows, Nintendo Switch, PlayStation 4 and Xbox One on July 25, 2019, and for Amazon Luna on November 24, 2020.

The collection received "generally favorable" reviews according to Metacritic. Praise by critics was given to the high value for money, quality of each game included, the graphics, the original multiplayer elements of Academy, and the enjoyment for fans of the genre. However, criticism was given to the short length of each game, the lack of bonus content such as concept art or behind the scenes content and the simplistic presentation of the collection, the lack of inclusion of the Mighty Switch Force! 2 spin-off Mighty Switch Force! Hose It Down! or the preceding Mighty series titles, and the decision to include both the first game and Hyper Drive Edition as separate entries.

== Legacy ==
Since its release, Mighty Switch Force! has turned into a signature WayForward series and Patty has become a recognizable WayForward hero.

On April 10, 2018, a downloadable content pack for Shantae: Half-Genie Hero was released that added an additional story campaign featuring character costumes and gameplay mechanics from Mighty Switch Force. The DLC sees a storyline where Shantae rounds up Space Hooligans. On April 1, 2021, WayForward released a fake trailer for a 'WayForward characters' dating sim game called "Are We Soulmates Or Am I Just Being Way Forward", which featured "Hooligan Sister #4" as one of the romanceable characters (as well as "Robot T-Rex" from Mighty Milky Way).

In December, 2022, River City Girls 2 featured a cameo appearance by "Patricia Wagon" as one of the game's shopkeepers. Stephanie Komure returned to voice the role.

On April 1, 2023, WayForward jokingly announced a new Mighty Switch Force! game called "Mighty Switch Force: Art Inspector", with art of a green-garbed Patty confronting a "Rogue AI".

Patty has been featured alongside Shantae and other WayForward heroes in numerous celebratory art released by WayForward over the years, and she is featured on the cover for WayForward's official podcast, WayForward Chat, which began in June 2025.
