= Wendy: Every Witch Way =

2001 video game

- North American cover art
- Developer: WayForward Technologies
- Publisher: TDK Mediactive
- Director: Matt Bozon
- Producers: David Artuso; Shereef Morse
- Designers: Matt Bozon; Mark Bozon; Paul Kite
- Programmer: Jimmy Huey
- Artist: Matt Bozon
- Composer: Brandon Amison
- Platform: Game Boy Color
- Release: September 2001
- Genres: Action, platform
- Mode: Single-player

Wendy: Every Witch Way is an action platform video game published by TDK Mediactive and developed by WayForward Technologies for the Game Boy Color in 2001. The game centers on Wendy the Good Little Witch from the Casper the Friendly Ghost series. Wendy accidentally opens her aunts' chest containing magical stones, which upset the gravity of a floating castle that crashes onto her house. The player controls Wendy through four worlds with sixteen levels, with each world having three side-scrolling levels and one horizontal shooter stage. Inserting the game in the Game Boy Advance unlocks a new world exclusive to the console.

The game was conceived as a tie-in for a planned reboot animated series. It received generally positive reviews from video game critics, who praised it for its originality but criticized its short length. WayForward's Matt Bozon would later take inspiration from Wendy: Every Witch Way for their 2009 game Mighty Flip Champs.

== Plot and gameplay ==
Gameplay of Wendy: Every Witch Way.

Wendy: Every Witch Way is a side-scrolling action platform video game. The game stars Wendy the Good Little Witch, a character from the Casper the Friendly Ghost series. One day, Wendy goes into her aunts' attic, finding and opening a chest containing the magical Moon Stones. In doing so, they upset the gravity of the floating Moon Stone Castle causing it to crash onto her house. Wendy must collect the stones to restore the gravity.

The game spans four worlds: Halls, Gardens, Dungeons, and Towers. Each world has three side-scrolling levels and a horizontal shooter stage with Wendy firing at enemies while riding her broom. At the end of each world, Wendy obtains a stone on an altar. The game ends with a boss battle with a dragon. Inserting the game in a Game Boy Advance unlocks the console-exclusive Advance World with three new levels. It also included a password that unlocks unlimited firepower.

== Development ==
Wendy: Every Witch Way was developed by WayForward Technologies, published by TDK Mediactive, and designed by Matt Bozon. It was meant as a tie-in for a planned animated series that fell through. Inspiration for the game came from 1991's Metal Storm for the Nintendo Entertainment System. Vincent Bitetti, the CEO of TDK Mediactive, mentioned that the game should appeal to both girls and boys. The game engine used for Wendy: Every Witch Way was used for previous Wayforward titles such as Xtreme Sports and Sabrina: The Animated Series: Zapped!. The game was released in September 2001.

== Reception and legacy ==
Reception

Aggregate score
Aggregator	Score
GameRankings	82%

Review scores
Publication	Score
GameZone	7.5/10
IGN	8/10
Jeuxvideo.com	13/20
Nintendo Power	4.5/5
Gamezilla	90/100

Wendy: Every Witch Way received generally positive reviews from video game critics, with a score of 82% on the rating aggregator GameRankings. Critics praised the game for its originality, with IGN's Craig Harris calling it "an extremely original action title". The graphics were also well received. Michael Lafferty from GameZone described it to be "lush and colorful". GameZilla's Mike Messersmith noted the animation in the game to be "top-notch" for a Game Boy Color title. Its sound design garnered a mixed response. Mike Messersmith spoke positive about its sound effects and music, while Michael Lafferty was less positive, calling the audio "limited". Criticism was given to the game about its short length. A writer for Jeuxvideo.com remarked that the levels were few and short.

In an interview with Pocket Gamer about their game Mighty Flip Champs, WayForward's Matt Bozon said they took some inspiration from Wendy: Every Witch Way for their new title. Mark Bozon added that they wanted to make a game that was a spiritual successor to Every Witch Way in terms of concept.
