= Skyboard =

Skyboard can refer to:

- A Skyboard - A lightweight board similar to a snowboard, used for skysurfing.
- Skyboard (glider) - A one-person glider.
- Skyboard - A type of advertising hoarding; see Mobile billboard.
