= Regular Show: Mordecai and Rigby in 8-Bit Land =

2013 video game

- Developer: WayForward Technologies
- Publishers: NA: D3 Publisher; EU: Namco Bandai Games
- Director: Jeff Luke
- Producer: Aaron Blean
- Designers: Jeff Luke; Aaron Davis
- Programmers: Dave Mianowski; Ted Rivera
- Artists: David Nyari; Jason Wright
- Writer: J. G. Quintel
- Composer: Jake Kaufman
- Engine: EngineBlack
- Platform: Nintendo 3DS
- Release: NA: October 29, 2013; EU: November 8, 2013; AU: November 12, 2013
- Genres: Action-adventure, platform, shoot 'em up
- Mode: Single-player

Regular Show: Mordecai and Rigby in 8-Bit Land is a video game based on the Cartoon Network series Regular Show. It was developed by WayForward Technologies and was released exclusively for the Nintendo 3DS in North America on October 29, 2013; Europe on November 8, 2013; and Australia on November 12, 2013.

The game was delisted from the Nintendo eShop at some point between 2017 and 2019, most likely due to an expiring license.

== Gameplay ==
The player, controlling Mordecai, in a boss fight

Based on the two-part fourth season premiere "Exit 9B", Regular Show: Mordecai and Rigby in 8-Bit Land depicts Mordecai and Rigby noticing the arrival of a video game console, which distracts them from lawn mowing work commanded by their boss Benson. Once they boot it up, they are sucked into the television screen, the titular 8-bit land, as the game's playable characters. The two traverse four worlds, each consisting of four levels and with different themes, to stop the son of Garrett Bobby Ferguson, also known as Giant Bearded Face, from creating an entrance to the underworld via the park Mordecai and Rigby work at.

Players act Mordecai and Rigby and have to switch between both characters and gameplay modes within stages, of which there are three throughout: platform, top-down shooter, and side-scrolling shooter. In the platform sections, Mordecai can double jump and Rigby, due to his shorter size, can crawl into small areas; the side-scrolling shooter sections have Mordecai morphed into a spaceship, while the top-down shooters involves the player controlling Rigby. The player has to manage switching between the two frequently depending on the context.

Many of the enemies and concepts in the final games are inspired by episodes from the show, including power-ups and boss fights. Each world contains unique concepts that players must learn to pass each level, before the fourth merges them all together. Additional unlockables can be attained by collecting VHS tapes, including concept art, a music player, in-game cheats, and a New Game+ mode.

== Development ==
Regular Show: Mordecai and Rigby in 8-Bit Land was first announced by series creator J. G. Quintel on April 8, 2013, when he posted on his Twitter page that an official video game was in development based on the show. On May 14, 2013, Cartoon Network and D3 Publisher announced three video games based on Cartoon Network properties that would be released in the fall: Regular Show: Mordecai and Rigby in 8-Bit Land, Adventure Time: Explore the Dungeon Because I DON'T KNOW!, and Ben 10: Omniverse 2; High Voltage Software developed the Ben 10: Omniverse title, and WayForward Technologies was responsible for the Adventure Time and Regular Show games. On June 26, 2013, Quintel tweeted the game's cover, revealing the title, as well as the game being exclusive to the Nintendo 3DS and published by D3 Publisher.

Quintel had a passion for both video games and animation as a child. He stated in a 2013 Polygon interview that he had just as much of a probability of working in game development as animation, and only chose the latter because he found storytelling more interesting than programming. The main characters' love of video games are based on Quintel's experience playing Master System titles with his brother, and is a major part of the Regular Show cartoon with many references to retro gaming present. Quintel was very committed to keeping them as true as possible; for example, he directed the storyboard artists to make the TV and console look as much like the ones he grew up with as possible.

For Regular Show: Mordecai and Rigby in 8-Bit Land and Adventure Time: Explore the Dungeon Because I DON'T KNOW!, WayForward received input from the series' creator to make sure the personality and humor was reflected. This included the gameplay and its style; for example, in the Regular Show game, a mullet powers up the player with special attacks. In both projects, WayForward's role, as well as biggest challenge, was balancing the creator's ideas, such as with gameplay styles. This was especially the case with Regular Show, which involved the player switching between three gameplay modes, and the ultimate plan was to refine the individual styles before focusing on how they came together.

The game was demoed at New York Comic Con in July 2013, and was officially released to North American markets on October 29, 2013. A launch trailer was also published online the same day. It would later release in Europe on November 8th and Australia on November 12th.

== Reception ==
Reception

Aggregate score
Aggregator	Score
Metacritic	48/100

Review scores
Publication	Score
Destructoid	7/10
Electronic Gaming Monthly	4/10
EP Daily	8/10
GamesRadar+	1.5/5
IGN	6.2/10
Nintendo Life	4/10
Nintendo World Report	6/10
Pocket Gamer	1.5/5

Regular Show: Mordecai and Rigby in 8-Bit Land garnered "generally unfavorable" reviews according to the review aggregation website Metacritic. Pocket Gamer's Mike Rose labeled it WayForward's worst product, and Lucas Sullivan of GamesRadar+ called it just as enjoyable as the free Regular Show flash games on Cartoon Network's website. A common point of discussion was the high difficulty, which most critics found illegitimate and affected by poor hit detection and imprecise, slippery controls. Rose reported that it was difficult to jump, where the playable characters "float around and regularly overshoot where you hoped to land them, making the simpliest of tasks a chore to complete". Bob Fekete of IGN reported several instances of getting killed by enemies off-screen and falling through platforms. When it came to enemies, Sullivan argued a player can die if he is "seemingly one pixel off center" of the sprite, and Electronic Gaming Monthly's Chris Holzworth wrote that jumping on a sprite from a corner was a gamble. He also claimed the player could still die from a pit in the horizontal platform part even if in shooter mode. Rose reported an glitch where an enemy died the instant it was above the playable character.

A frequently-held opinion was that its concepts, particularly the ability to switch between gameplay modes, had potential marred by other problems that made the overall experience unenjoyable. Pocket Gamer's Mike Rose thought that the gameplay alteration mechanic could have added a puzzle-solving element, but the level design made it too obvious which mode to choose. Sullivan noted the only instance of all three styles coming together was the stages in the last world, and other reviewers noted that this combination of gameplay styles was more chaotic than intended.

In general, reviewers felt Regular Show: Mordecai and Rigby in 8-Bit Land did not adequately represent the personality and humor of the original series, resulting in a bland platform game that could have had any other characters as playable; this was considered inexcusable due to involvement from the series' creator. To most reviewers, the game lacked an actual narrative, and the only story presented was still images with no voice acting at the beginning. Fekete was amused by the bosses stated that what plot there is "works well enough", while Curtis Bonds of Nintendo World Report found it "blandly written". Also condemned was the lack of replay value; critics reported completion within an hour, and found the extras and collectibles limited and not worth trying to obtain.
