= Jake the Dog =

Fictional character in the animated series Adventure Time

- Adventure Time character
- First appearance: Adventure Time (short) (2007)
- Created by: Pendleton Ward
- Voiced by: John DiMaggio

In-universe information
- Species: Dog/shapeshifter hybrid
- Gender: Male
- Family: Joshua (biological father); Warren Ampersand (biological/mechanical parent); Margaret (step mother); Jermaine (half-brother); Finn (adoptive brother)
- Significant others: Lady Rainicorn (girlfriend); Ice King (Ex-Husband) (as a joke in When Wedding Bells Thaw)
- Children: Charlie (daughter); Jake Jr. (daughter); T.V. (son); Viola (daughter); Kim Kil Whan (son)
- Relatives: Pat (daughter-in-law via Kim Kil Whan); Bronwyn (granddaughter via Kim Kil Whan); Gibbon (grandson via Charlie)

Jake the Dog Sr. is a fictional character and one of the two protagonists of the American animated television series Adventure Time and its franchise created by Pendleton Ward. He also appeared in the spin-off series Adventure Time: Distant Lands. The character made his debut in the original pilot. During the events of the show, Jake says that he is 28 "magical dog years" old.

Jake can stretch, shrink, or mold any part of his body to any shape and almost any size, ranging from becoming gigantic to becoming incredibly small. He acts as a confident mentor to his energetic adopted brother Finn the Human, though he tends to give somewhat questionable advice. His powers help Finn considerably in combat and transportation but are sometimes used as nothing more than pleasant forms of expression. He has a girlfriend named "Lady Rainicorn" (voiced by Niki Yang); they have five children together, as seen in "Jake the Dad". He is quite skilled at playing the viola, which houses a worm named "Shelby Butterson the Worm Who Lives in Jake's Viola".

Jake has received generally positive reviews from critics. A gender-swapped version of Jake called Cake the Cat appeared in the third-season episode "Fionna and Cake", and is a main character of the spinoff series Adventure Time: Fionna and Cake.

== Design and voice acting ==
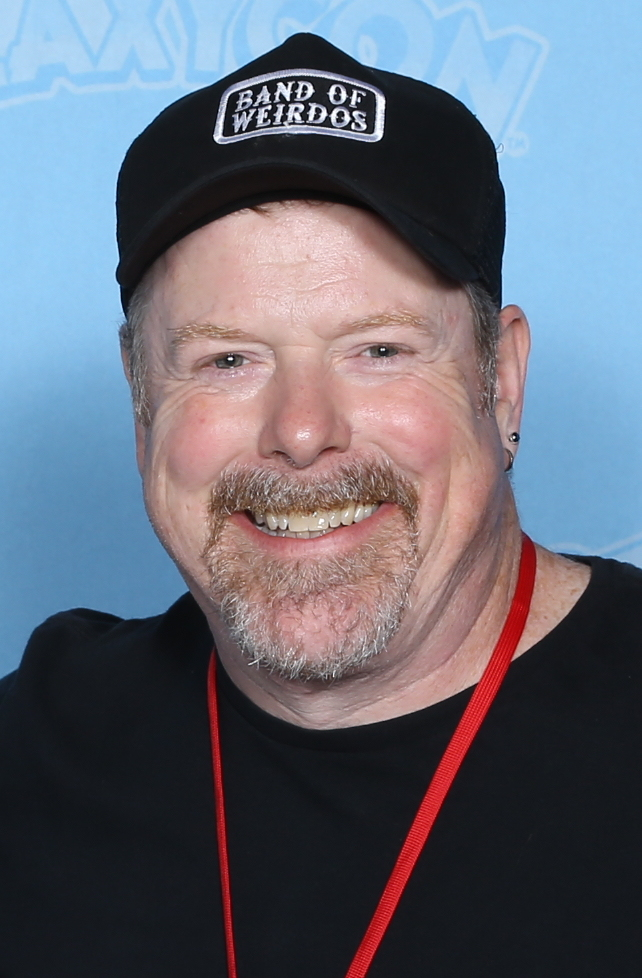
Jake is voiced by John DiMaggio (2019)

Series creator Pendleton Ward has stated that he wrote Finn and Jake, including Adventure Time as a whole, as though he were playing a session of Dungeons & Dragons, a tabletop role-playing game. Ward commented that Finn and Jake's motivations are noble, with a desire to "slay monsters, explore dungeons, find loot." He further said that "Jake was more into the loot". Ward spent much of his childhood at home, describing his "[indoor] adventure experience" as inspiring Finn and Jake the Dog's adventures. Early on in the development of the show, Ward had intended for Finn and Jake to be nomads who lived in tents. However, this was changed to having them live in a permanent home at Cartoon Network's request. Jake has three, four, or five fingers on each hand, as well as both hands and paws, which means, according to Ward, that he has the ability to grow and be flexible. He first appeared in the short film "Adventure Time", which centers around rescuing Princess Bubblegum (Paige Moss) from the evil Ice King (John Kassir). This short aired as part of Nickelodeon's Random! Cartoons showcase in 2008. John DiMaggio voiced the character, then called Jake, in short.

In 2018, as Adventure Time was ending, DiMaggio said "Until something's signed on the line there is no speculation ... this is it. It's over. It's done. And that's OK." He further said "A lot of me is in Jake, and I'll miss that part, that connection." Adventure Time composer Tim Kiefer said that the show had gradually become an exploration of the "Hero's journey" through the characters.

== Personality and character traits ==
=== Background ===
According to the series, Jake was conceived when his father, Joshua, was bitten by the shapeshifting extra-dimensional creature Warren Ampersand during a detective investigation with his wife Margaret, and was later born from a pustule on his father's head originating from the creature's bite. It is inferred that Jake's magical powers are a result of his biological relationship with Ampersand, though he is apparently unaware of the circumstances of his birth and instead believes his powers to be the result of having rolled around in a "magical mud puddle" as a pup. After his birth, Jake was raised normally by Joshua and Margaret as their son, alongside their own biological son Jermaine and their adoptive human son Finn.

Little has been shown in the series about Jake's subsequent childhood life with his family, though in his youth, he was known to be a successful criminal and the leader of his own gang, a position he later retired from to take part in a more respectable life as an adventurer with Finn. Around this time, he also began a romantic relationship with Lady Rainicorn, with whom he has five children—daughters Charlie, Viola, and Jake Jr., and sons T.V. and Kim Kil Whan. Although Jake eventually passes away at some point after the end of the series, "Come Along With Me", "Graybles 1000+", and Fionna and Cake show glimpses of a future Ooo in which Jake's descendants have established a spacefaring civilization.

== Appearances ==
Jake the Dog is one of the main characters of Adventure Time and often appears alongside his best friend and adopted brother Finn the Human.

In the series finale "Come Along with Me", Finn and Jake help Princess Bubblegum fight her dictatorial uncle Gumbald. Realizing that violence is not the answer to the conflict, they ally with Gumbald to defeat the evil deity GOLB, who is intent on destroying Ooo. GOLB is defeated, although Fern dies in the aftermath. Jake and Finn promises to plant Fern's seedling in the ruins of the treehouse, which has been destroyed. The seedling grows into a new treehouse, with a grass sword inside. Finn and Jake are shown relaxing on a beach witnessing the humans return to Ooo for the first time in centuries.

The Adventure Time: Distant Lands special "Together Again" takes place sometime after the end of the series, after Jake has died. Finn, who has recently died, journeys through the Dead Worlds to be reunited with Jake, who died many years before him. After they reunite in the afterlife, the two choose to reincarnate back into the living world.

In Adventure Time: Fionna and Cake, Jake is absent but it is implied that he has died, since he no longer accompanies Finn and everyone speaks of him in the past tense. Season 2, episode 9, "The Karmic Worm," alludes to the moment of Jake's death.

=== Others ===
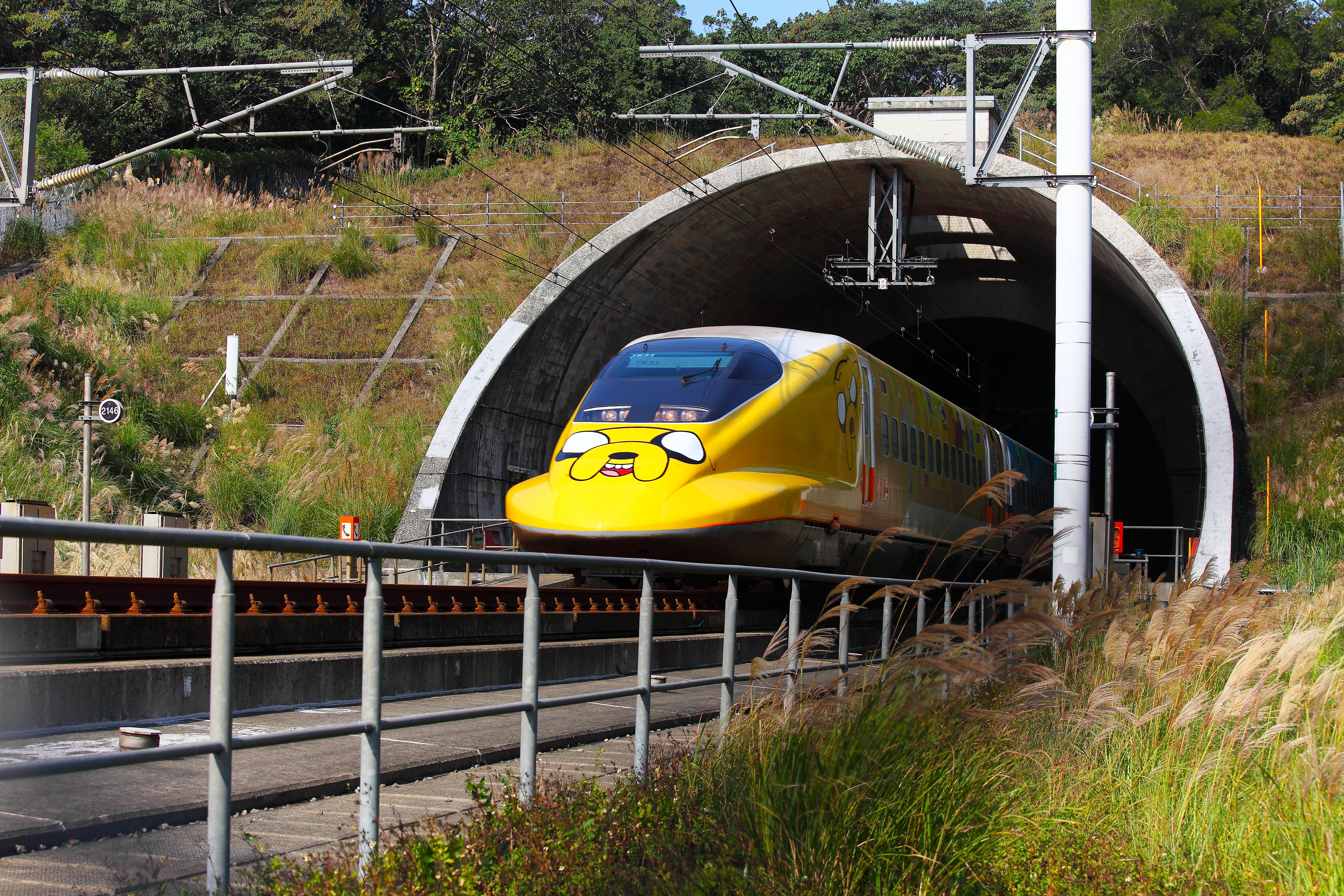
Jake painted on a THSR 700T in Hsinchu, Taiwan

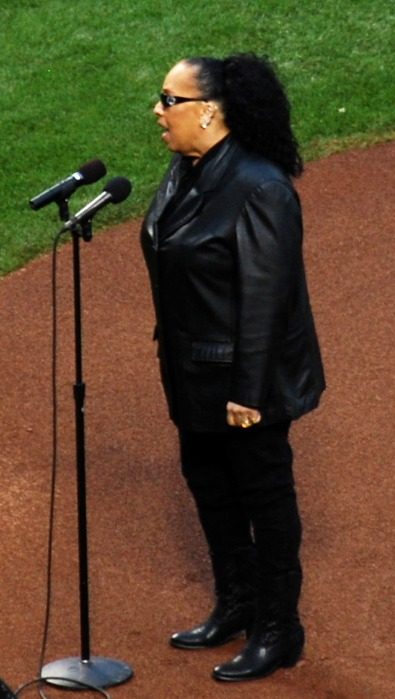
Cake the cat (Jake's gender-swapped counterpart) is voiced by Roz Ryan.

Since Adventure Time's inception, Jake has appeared in various comic book series, video games, and other merchandise. Jake's first console game appearance was as a playable character in Adventure Time: Hey Ice King! Why'd You Steal Our Garbage?!!, which was released on Nintendo DS and 3DS in 2012. He was subsequently a playable character in Adventure Time: Explore the Dungeon Because I Don't Know! (2013), Adventure Time: The Secret of the Nameless Kingdom (2014), and Adventure Time: Pirates of the Enchiridion (2018).

Jake has also made crossover appearances in other franchises and media. He appeared in the seventh season Futurama episode "Leela and the Genestalk". In the Futurama episode, Jake had a minor dialogue, and was still voiced by DiMaggio, who also voiced one of the main characters in Futurama, Bender. The opening sequence couch gag in the 28th season The Simpsons episode "Monty Burns' Fleeing Circus", Homer Simpson appears as Jake in an extended couch gag parodying the opening sequence of Adventure Time. He also appeared in the Uncle Grandpa episodes "Pizza Eve" and "Cartoon Factory". He also appeared in the OK K.O.! Let's Be Heroes episode, "Crossover Nexus". Jake is a playable character in toys-to-life game Lego Dimensions (2015), beat 'em up game Cartoon Network: Battle Crashers (2016), crossover game Bloons Tower Defense: Adventure Time (2018), and fighting game Brawlhalla (2019), and action-adventure game Immortals Fenyx Rising (2020). In November 2021, Jake was confirmed to appear as a playable character in the fighting game MultiVersus (2022). He appeared in the Teen Titans Go! episode, "Warner Bros. 100th Anniversary" and makes a cameo as one of police car's different style in The Wonderfully Weird World of Gumball episode, The Cheapmas.

=== Fionna and Cake ===
A gender-swapped version of Jake called Cake the Cat appeared in the season 3 episode "Fionna and Cake", and was brought back in subsequent episodes. Cake is a main character in the spin-off series Adventure Time: Fionna and Cake and is voiced by Roz Ryan. The concept for Fionna and Cake came from drawings made by Adventure Time storyboard artist Natasha Allegri. Both Fionna and Cake the Cat became popular with Adventure Time fans. Cake later appeared in the fifth-season episode "Bad Little Boy", the sixth-season episode "The Prince Who Wanted Everything", the eighth-season episode "Five Short Tables", and the ninth season episode "Fionna and Cake and Fionna". Cake went on to star in the spin-off series Adventure Time: Fionna and Cake.

== Reception ==
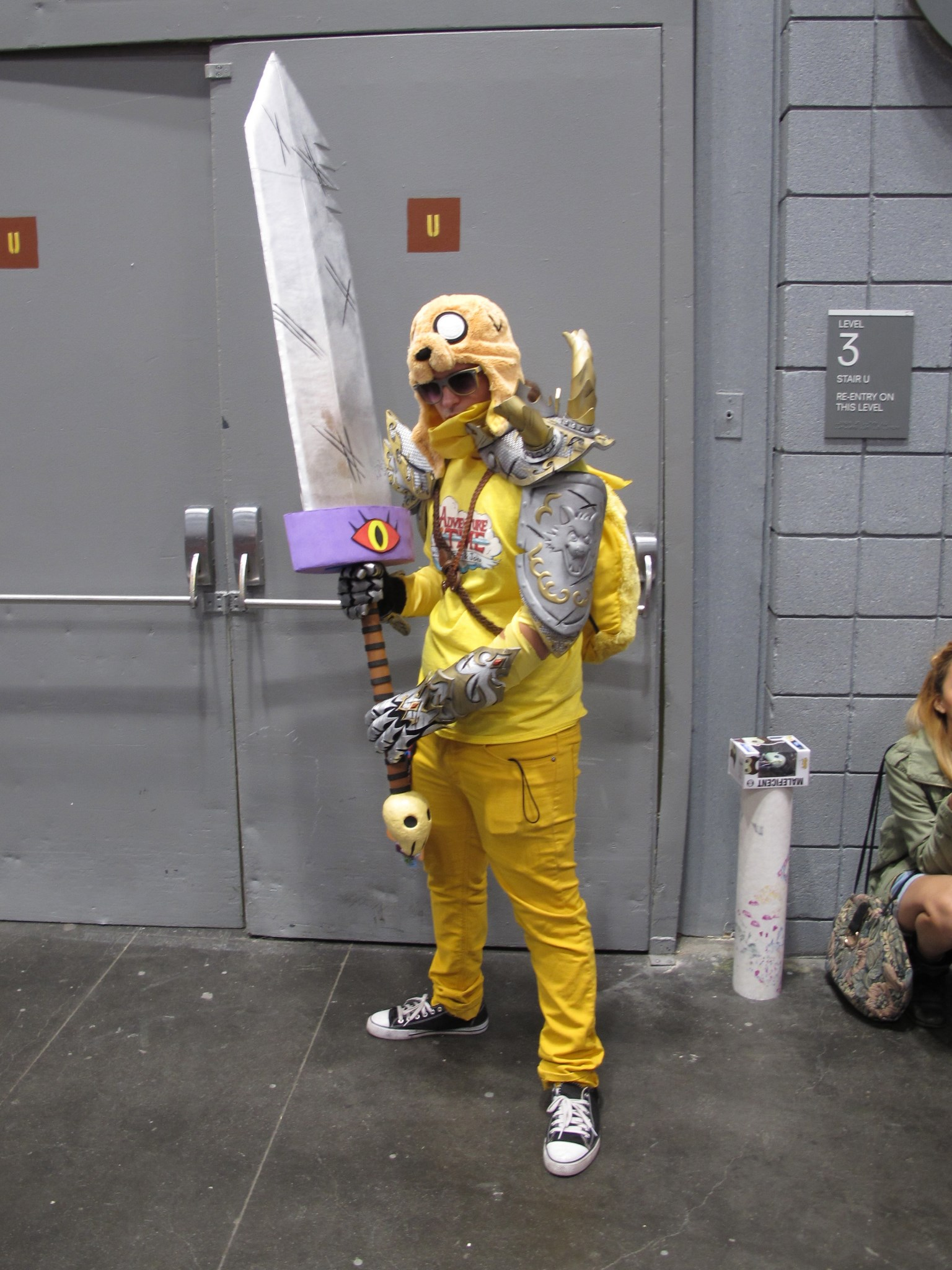
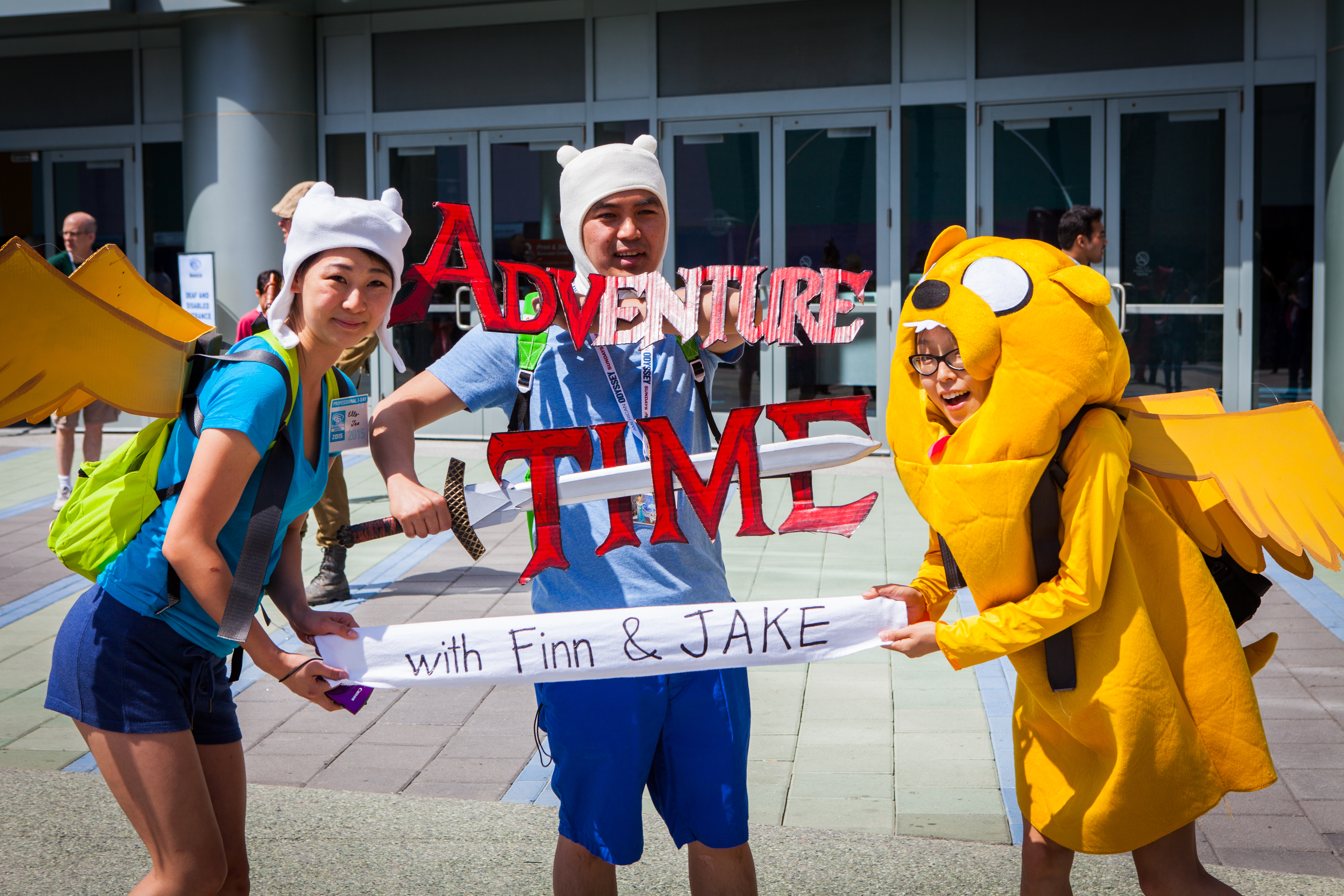
Jake, along with Finn has become popular among Adventure Time's fanbase, as well as cosplayers.

Jake has received generally positive reviews from critics. Brandon Zachary of Comic Book Resources claimed that Jake is the best character on TV, stating that "while Finn has experienced a strong character arc, Jake has proved to be far more fascinating." Dan Neilan of The A.V. Club claimed that "Jake is the ultimate sidekick," stating further that "Not only can he grow, shrink, and transform into any shape that might help his buddy Finn during battle, but he can also dance, sing, and make a mean plate of bacon pancakes." Richard Whittaker of The Austin Chronicle noted that he felt that the "strong but emotionally vulnerable" Cake was written in a way that successfully provided a female analog for Jake as a gender-swapped version. Cassidy Ward of Syfy mentioned of how "bizarre" the biology of Jake. Writing for Vox, Emily VanDerWerff called the series "this era's finest coming-of-age story", mentioning how Jake "has moved from happy wanderer to something like adulthood."

Jake became popular among Adventure Time's fanbase. In 2019, Rich Goldstein of The Daily Beast commented on Jake's popularity among cosplayers, saying "Halloween nights and comic conventions of the last few years have seen an increase in the number of children (and adults) all over the U.S. who wore Finn and Jake costumes." John DiMaggio recalled "walking around at conventions and seeing everybody wearing their Finn costumes and their Jake costumes and how the characters endeared themselves to people". A float in Jake's likeness was included in the 2013 Macy's Thanksgiving Day Parade.
