= Adventure Time: Pirates of the Enchiridion =

2018 role-playing video game

- Developer: Climax Studios
- Publisher: Outright Games
- Series: Adventure Time
- Engine: Unity
- Platforms: Nintendo Switch; PlayStation 4 Windows; Xbox One; Google Stadia
- Release: US: July 17, 2018; WW: July 20, 2018; Luna: US: December 13, 2021; Stadia: WW: March 25, 2022
- Genre: Role-playing
- Mode: Single-player

Adventure Time: Pirates of the Enchiridion is a 2018 role-playing video game developed by Climax Studios and published by Outright Games. It was released in July 2018 for Nintendo Switch, PlayStation 4, Windows and Xbox One, on Amazon Luna in December 2021, and on Google Stadia in March 2022, and is based on Cartoon Network's Adventure Time television series. It is the fifth game based on the series, set during the events of its tenth and final season.

== Plot ==
While out stargazing, Finn and Jake tell BMO that they will stay up late as BMO turns in early, and the two immediately fall asleep. The next day, they wake up to find that Ooo has flooded, and they find a new boat to traverse the realm. They quickly notice that the Ice Kingdom is melting, and sail over. When they arrive, they find the Ice King (Simon Petrikov) bawling. Simon tells the two that he lost his crown, and the Ice Kingdom is melting because he cannot keep the temperature in check.

Finn and Jake go to the Candy Kingdom to see if Princess Bubblegum knows anything about the crown. While searching for Bubblegum, they find Marceline, who says that Bubblegum was kidnapped by pirates and taken to the Dark Forest. The group makes it to the Dark Forest, where they discover and defeat Fern, and rescue Bubblegum, who said that she was fixing the Ice Crown, which was tampered with by someone.

After returning Bubblegum to the Candy Kingdom, they return to the Ice Kingdom and give Simon his crown, and he regains his ice powers. The group then search for Fern. During their search, they find BMO, who was also kidnapped by the Pirates. After saving BMO, the Candy Kingdom comes under the attack of the Varmints. After defeating the Mother Varmint, they go to the Fire Kingdom to find Fern.

They find Flame Princess instead, who tells the group that due to the flood, the Core of the Fire Kingdom is going out, so the four block the Valves to the Core. Weakened, Flame Princess tells the group to get to the Core Room. After making it to the Core Room, they find Fern again, who sends in a Fire Giant to cover his escape.

After beating the giant, Flame Princess tells them to find Torcho, her cousin, as she is the only one who can superheat the Core. The group find her, and persuade her to help the Kingdom, as heating the Core would make her fire go out.

After that, they return to the Ice Kingdom, where they learn that Uncle Gumbald, Aunt Lolly, and Cousin Chicle were responsible for this, in an elaborate attempt to frame Bubblegum so Gumbald could rule over the Candy Kingdom (which was a failure, as no one had considered Bubblegum to be responsible). After a brief battle, Gumbald, Lolly and Chicle are arrested. Finn, Jake, Marceline and BMO pull the drain, draining the water away and saving Ooo.

In a post-credits scene, Fern returns and frees Gumbald and the others from prison.

== Gameplay ==
Players use a boat in open-environment sailing to reach the main areas of the game, where RPG turn-based combat occurs. The game also features an occasional cross-examination minigame, where Finn and Jake must interrogate villains in "good cop, bad cop" fashion.

== Development ==
The game was announced on December 14, 2017. A trailer for the game was released on April 26, 2018.

== Reception ==
Reception

Aggregate score
Aggregator	Score
Metacritic	(NS) 50/100 (PS4) 62/100 (XONE) 66/100

Review scores
Publication	Score
Destructoid	4/10
IGN	5.8/10
Nintendo Life	5/10
Push Square	6/10

On Metacritic, the PlayStation 4, Xbox One, and Nintendo Switch versions of Adventure Time: Pirates of the Enchiridion have respective scores of 62%, 66%, and 50%, all indicating "mixed or average" reviews.

Giving the game a 5.8/10, IGN called it "a good game for beginners, and we get a small taste of how great exploring the show’s world and quirky characters could be. But the lack of challenge and options will probably bore veterans."
