= Mystik Belle =

2015 video game

- Steam cover art
- Developer: Last Dimension
- Publishers: Last Dimension (Windows, Nintendo Switch); WayForward (PlayStation 4, Xbox One)
- Designer: Andrew Bado
- Composer: Dan Rogers
- Engine: GameMaker
- Platforms: Linux; Microsoft Windows; PlayStation 4 Xbox One; Nintendo Switch
- Release: Windows; May 15, 2015; PlayStation 4, Xbox One; October 3, 2017; Nintendo Switch; September 9, 2021
- Genre: Platform
- Mode: Single-player

Mystik Belle is a 2015 platformer created by American developer Andrew Bado and released through his company, Last Dimension. It follow Belle, a magic school student.

The game was first released for Microsoft Windows in 2015. Ports for Xbox One and PlayStation 4 followed in 2017, and for Nintendo Switch in 2021.

== Premise ==
The game is focused on the struggles of Belle MacFae, a freshman student at the Hagmore School of Magic who ends up being blamed for something she didn't do while staying up late to practice her magic.

The game features pixel-art graphics and gameplay ranging between platforming and a point-and-click adventure game, with a sprawling academy to explore and plenty of characters to interact with along the way.

== Release ==
The game was first released by Last Dimension for Linux and Windows via the Steam platform on May 15, 2015. Ports for Xbox One and PlayStation 4 were released on October 3, 2017, developed by Last Dimension like the original PC version and published by WayForward, who also expressed interest in porting the game for Nintendo Switch once GameMaker integration would be implemented on the console. However, the Switch port was ultimately self-published by Last Dimension instead, and was released on September 9, 2021 under the title Mystik Belle Enchanted Edition.

In 2020, Mystik Belle's PS4 version received a limited physical release through Limited Run Games.

== Reception ==
Reviewing Mystik Belle's PS4 version, Chris Moyse of Destructoid drew parallels with older games such as Dizzy, Seymour and Slightly Magic. He noted the game's short length and low difficulty contributing to a "relaxed vibe," which he said made it an ideal choice for casual gaming audiences and young children. Though Moyse also enjoyed its pixel-art graphics and overall old-school sensibilities, characterizing them as "recalling the halcyon days of the Commodore Amiga" he opined that its "slow pace" felt "quite dated in the modern era" though noted that the option to speed the game's action up by 25% partially negated this flaw. Accordingly, Moyse awarded the game a "Good" score of 7/10. Paul Acevado of Windows Central, reviewing the Xbox One version, similarly praised Mystik Belle's "impressive 16-bit artwork and effects," saying it was reminiscent of classic Sega Saturn titles, although he criticized the "floaty" jump and the game's short length. Drew Leachman of ZGTD similarly criticized the "floaty" platforming, as well as the combat and the limited size of Belle's item inventory, but overall deemed it a "decently fun game" and opined that "you could do a lot worse" for the asking price.
