= Xtreme Sports (video game) =

2000 video game

- North American cover art
- Developer: WayForward Technologies
- Publishers: Infogrames North America (GBC); WayForward (digital)
- Director: Matt Bozon
- Producer: John Beck
- Designer: Matt Bozon
- Programmer: Jimmy Huey
- Artist: Matt Bozon
- Composer: Brandon Amison
- Platforms: Game Boy Color; Nintendo Switch
- Release: Game Boy Color: NA: June 29, 2000; Nintendo Switch: WW: August 15, 2023
- Genre: Sports
- Modes: Single player, multiplayer

Xtreme Sports is a sports video game developed by WayForward Technologies for the Game Boy Color. It was initially published by Infogrames North America, and first released in North America on June 29, 2000. The game is similar to one of WayForward's PC games, Xtreme Sports Arcade: Summer Edition (1999). The artist of Xtreme Sports would later go on to continue work with the Shantae series. A port for Nintendo Switch was released on August 15, 2023.

== Gameplay ==
In Xtreme Sports, players compete against more than 200 computer-controlled opponents on 25 different tracks in sports such as street luge, skateboarding, inline skating, surfing and skyboarding. At the start of the game, players choose between characters Guppi and Fin and set off on a trip sponsored by the Xtreme Cola Company, which has invited all extreme sports athletes to Xtreme Sports Island to compete in a tournament. Among the people players encounter are the members of the Bone-Heads gang, who are the antagonists. The player's objective is to unravel the mystery behind them and win the tournament at the same time.

There are two modes available: Practice and Xtreme Island Adventure. In the former, players can participate in 15 different challenges with 3 difficulty settings. In the latter, players move around the island participating in events and exploring the surroundings. Some of the people players meet will give the player clues to solving the mystery of the Bone-Heads while others will issue challenges to compete in various sports. Players collect medals as the player win events. Players must win a certain number of easier challenges before the referees will allow the player into the tougher ones. Along the way, players can also find Twitchy Shakes, which are special drinks that will increase the player's abilities depending on the next event the player enters. Players may be able to attain higher speeds or even become invincible.

== Development and release ==
Laddie Ervin, director of marketing for sports and racing titles at Infogrames North America, Inc., stated, "Xtreme Sports will get the adrenaline pumping for Game Boy gamers this summer [...] From skysurfing to skateboarding to street luge, Xtreme Sports will challenge even the most devoted sports addict." The game was known to not support Link Cable play and was released on June 29, 2000 release. It was subsequently made available in 2014 as an emulated release via the 3DS Virtual Console in PAL regions on August 7, and in North America on August 21. It was also released for Nintendo Switch on August 15, 2023.

== Reception ==
Reception

Aggregate score
| Aggregator | Score |
|---|---|
| GameRankings | 80% |

Review scores
| Publication | Score |
|---|---|
| AllGame | 3.5/5 |
| Electronic Gaming Monthly | 6.5/10 |
| GameSpot | 8/10 |
| IGN | 8/10 |
| Nintendo Power | 7.9/10 |

The game received favorable reviews according to the review aggregation website GameRankings.

AllGame stated, "Xtreme Sports is a game aimed at a teen audience that doesn't go for normal sports titles, but the variety of events should appeal to almost anyone. The characters and theme are definitely weak points, but all in all Xtreme Sports is a solid game. Besides, how many Game Boy Color games let you surf, skateboard, skyboard, luge, and rollerblade in one package?" AllGame also stated, "The cartoon-style graphics seem to be Disney's interpretation of what teenagers look like. The game's visuals may not appeal to some, but the action is still enjoyable." GameSpot noted, "Xtreme Sports is definitely going to be an unsung hit. Rare is a portable sports title this rich. Its premise is unique and its execution is artful. There is definitely some fun to be had with this." IGN complained that "the biggest problem in Xtreme Sports is its maniacal pace -- the levels and game are well thought out, but all of them require a fast speed and a LOT of quick reaction on the buttons. Your characters are rather large on-screen, and there's not much head's up [sic] when obstacles approach or when the platforms go in different directions [...] Lots of practice is necessary for Xtreme Sports. Maybe that's why they included a Practice mode right up front." Despite this, IGN praised the game's graphics, commenting, "This is one of if not the most beautifully-styled games I've seen on the Game Boy Color."

== Follow Ups ==
When asked about making an Advanced version of Xtreme Sports, creator Matt Bozon said "I know that came up a couple of times but I don't think the first game was a huge seller. There were thoughts of having an Xtreme Sports sequel on Game Boy Color, but once that didn't pan out, Guppy started being a cameo in other games on Game Boy Advance. She'd appear in some games as a background character or something, but I don't think we put her in a Shantae game."
