= Pearl Harbor: Defend the Fleet =

2001 video game

- Developer: WayForward
- Publisher: WizardWorks
- Platform: Microsoft Windows
- Release: May 11, 2001
- Genre: Shooter game
- Mode: Single-player

Pearl Harbor: Defend the Fleet is an action video game developed by WayForward and published by WizardWorks for Microsoft Windows in 2001. It is a game in which the player shoots down waves of Japanese planes.

== Reception ==
Reception

Aggregate score
| Aggregator | Score |
|---|---|
| Metacritic | 48/100 |

Review scores
| Publication | Score |
|---|---|
| EP Daily | 6/10 |
| GameSpot | 3.6/10 |
| GameStar | 38% |
| GameZone | 6/10 |
| IGN | 5.3/10 |
| Next Generation | 1/5 |
| PC Gamer (US) | 42% |

The game received "generally unfavorable reviews" according to the review aggregation website Metacritic. Jeff Lundrigan of NextGen said that the game was "Good for a waste of 10 minutes and $20. That's about it."
