= WWF Betrayal =

2001 video game

- Cover art featuring Triple H, Stephanie McMahon and The Rock
- Developer: WayForward Technologies
- Publisher: THQ
- Director: Matt Bozon
- Producer: John Beck
- Programmer: Larry Holdaway
- Artists: Luke Brookshier; Debi Brookshire
- Composer: John Wasiel
- Platform: Game Boy Color
- Release: NA: August 7, 2001; EU: August 24, 2001
- Genre: Beat 'em up
- Mode: Single-player

WWF Betrayal is a beat 'em up on the Game Boy Color based on the World Wrestling Federation (WWF). It was the third and last WWF game released to the Game Boy Color and one of a few games based on the promotion that was of a different genre than the regular professional wrestling games usually produced.

The game's plot was roughly based on a storyline in 1999 where Stephanie McMahon gets kidnapped. Her father Vince McMahon promises to grant the player a shot at the WWF Championship if they manage to save her. The player must then fight through a series of side-scrolling levels to rescue Stephanie. The player can play as Stone Cold Steve Austin, The Rock, Triple H, or The Undertaker.

== Reception ==
Reception

Aggregate score
Aggregator	Score
GameRankings	51%

Review scores
Publication	Score
AllGame	2/5
Game Informer	3/10
GameSpot	4.9/10
IGN	6/10
Nintendo Power	3/5

The game received "generally mixed" reviews according to video game review aggregator GameRankings.

== See also ==
- List of licensed wrestling video games
- List of fighting games
