= Lunark =

2023 platform game

- Developer: Canari Games
- Publisher: WayForward
- Director: Johan Vinet
- Producer: David Fratto
- Programmers: Topher Anselmo; Oscar Gonzalez; Xitilon
- Composer: Johan Vinet
- Engine: GameMaker
- Platforms: Windows macOS; Nintendo Switch; Xbox One; Xbox Series X/S; PlayStation 4 PlayStation 5
- Release: Windows, Xbox One, Xbox Series X/S, macOS, Nintendo Switch; March 30, 2023; PlayStation 4, PlayStation 5 April 6, 2023
- Genre: Platform
- Mode: Single player

Lunark is a 2023 platform game developed by Canari Games and published by WayForward. The game was originally released for Windows, macOS, Xbox One, Xbox Series X/S and Nintendo Switch on March 30, 2023, with ports for the PlayStation 4 and PlayStation 5 released on April 6, 2023. The game follows Leo who has unique abilities, the player attempts to uncover the origin about humanity.

The game was mostly developed by the creator Johan Vinet. The Kickstarter funding for the game had raising over 81,655 Canadian dollars and the campaign ended in 2019.

== Gameplay ==
Lunark is a retro-style cinematic platformer. In the game, the player plays as Leo, a young boy with unique physical characteristics who has some unique abilities including his weapon to shoot and can overcoming traps and solving puzzles. The game has 12 levels for the player to explore.

== Plot ==
Centuries ago, Earth became increasingly unsustainable and the most optimistic forecasts predicted that humans could survive for another 10 years. Moon was transformed into a giant spaceship for humanity's survival by an artificial intelligence called Noah which was created by group of scientists. In order to transport millions of humans, the operation Lunark was undertaken as the last ditch effort to save humanity.

Centuries later, humans are about to celebrate the 300th anniversary of their arrival on their new home planet Albaryne. Leo returned to Albaryne to talk to some guard and builders about a rumor that there hasn't been single human casualty and Gideon. He later fly to the level Hitting a Wall.

He was being sent on a mission for an artifact but he realizes that someone was either framing him. As Leo uncovers new truths about why he being framed, puzzles hinder progression.

== Development ==
Lunark was inspired by many video games from the 1980s and 1990s such as Prince of Persia, Flashback and Another World. Johan Vinet begin working on the game creation in 2016 when he making demakes just for fun. during his thinking about the game creation, he details his love of old platform then he thought that he could made it a real game.

Vinet started his own company Canari Games and the Kickstarter campaign for the game was launched in 2019. Jordan Mechner, the creator of Prince of Persia noted that the game look like something Eric Chahi could made. Vinet originally intended to release the game on Microsoft Windows and macOS, but was able to develop for more platforms after WayForward contacted him for a publishing deal. Vinet was influenced by science fiction films, television series and books for the setting and plot of the game and drew inspiration from adventure films such as Indiana Jones and Back to the Future. The game's plot is based on the story of Noah's Ark from the Book of Genesis.

Vinet was set out to create a game that inspired by Prince of Persia and Flashback, while also create some elements, innovations, updated controls and unique features. Vinet want the game to be attracted by the colorful and dynamic theme instead of dystopian theme. Vinet also composed the game and the inspiration for the music were Blade Runner, Vangelis and more. Vinet used extensive rotoscoping for the game's cinematics; due to the production's small scope he would personally film all of the rotoscope footage.

=== Release ===
The game released on digital storefronts on March 30, 2023. Limited Run Games later released a physical version and collector editions for the Nintendo Switch. The game was released on PlayStation 4 and PlayStation 5 on April 6, 2023. In May 2023, a quality-of-life update was released in the game which featured additional checkpoints, level select after beating the game and bug fixes.

== Reception ==
Reception

Aggregate scores
Aggregator	Score
Metacritic	NS: 77/100; PC: 74/100
OpenCritic	75

Review scores
Publication	Score
Hardcore Gamer	4/5
Nintendo Life	8/10
TouchArcade	4/5

Luke Plunkett of Kotaku enjoyed the game because of the rotoscoping. Shaun Musgrave of TouchArcade considered the game one of the all-timers of cinematic platforming.
