= WayForward =

American video game developer

WayForward Technologies, Inc.
- Type: Private
- Industry: Video games
- Founded: March 1990; 36 years ago
- Founder: Voldi Way
- Headquarters: Valencia, Santa Clarita, California, U.S.
- Key people: Voldi Way (CEO); Matt Bozon (creative director)
- Products: Shantae series; Mighty series; River City Girls series
- Website: wayforward.com

WayForward Technologies, Inc. is an American independent video game developer and publisher based in Valencia, California. Founded in March 1990 by technology entrepreneur Voldi Way, WayForward started by developing games for consoles such as the Super NES and Sega Genesis, as well as TV games and PC educational software. In 1997, they relaunched their video games arm, placing the company as a contractor for publishers and working on a variety of licensed assets.

The company has created a variety of original game properties such as their flagship Shantae series, including the first title in the series which appeared on the Game Boy Color and was published by Capcom. WayForward Technologies has worked on games for the Game Boy Advance, Nintendo DS, Nintendo 3DS and PlayStation Vita handheld consoles, WiiWare games for Nintendo's Wii and Wii U, Nintendo Switch consoles and games for PC and mobile phones.

== History ==
WayForward Technologies was founded in 1990 by Voldi Way as an independent video game design company, following on from a previous company he started that specialized in software for sheet metal fabrication. Early on, the company focused on producing software for the Super NES, Genesis, Game Gear and Game Boy Color. They branched out into educational games for the personal computer and Leapster. During this time, many of the staff were doing other jobs in order to support their ambition to become game developers.

In 1994, WayForward Technologies entered into a partnership with American Education Publishing in order to focus on developing further educational video games. The partnership was successful, with the company winning awards for innovation at the 1995 Consumer Electronics Show. During this time, WayForward focused on licensed assets such as the Muppets for their educational games.

WayForward restarted their video game development business in April 1997, working as a "developer for hire" by providing services to software publishers. John Beck, CEO, stated that by providing services on small projects the company has managed to remain a stable level of work. In mid-2002, WayForward released their first internally developed game based on their own intellectual property Shantae. While it achieved critical acclaim, it was one of the last games to be released for the Game Boy Color and as a result only enjoyed limited success.

When Nintendo announced the dual-screen handheld console that became the Nintendo DS in early 2004, WayForward began examining the various options the new console offered. Work started on a sequel to Shantae using the two screens. Despite presenting the concepts to a number of publishers, they were ultimately unsuccessful at securing a deal. Because of the large number of Shantae related assets that were produced, including 3D models, WayForward frequently uses them when trying out new technology or development platforms. In 2004, the company was contracted by THQ to produce a chat game called Ping Pals for the Nintendo DS. Despite the tight timescales involved in developing the game, WayForward used the opportunity to obtain development kits for the platform. The game was received unfavourably by the majority of critics and gained only a single positive review. In 2006, the company produced and released Justice League Heroes: The Flash just as the Game Boy Advance was reaching the end of its commercial life cycle, which met with mixed reviews. WayForward has gone on to develop further titles for the Nintendo DS. Looney Tunes: Duck Amuck, based on the 1951 Warner Bros. cartoon Duck Amuck received mixed reviews upon release.

On February 19, 2008, John Beck and Matt Bozon were speakers at the Independent Games Summit, part of the 2008 Game Developers Conference, discussing a range of issues facing independent games companies. Lit was announced on March 5, 2008, and was released on February 9, 2009, for the WiiWare online shop platform. A new game in the Shantae series was considered for the platform.

WayForward introduced a new character named Alta, who is a pink-haired girl that wields a scepter. She represented a new intellectual property. This was revealed on March 9, 2009, to be a DSiWare game called Mighty Flip Champs!. WayForward created Mighty Milky Way, another puzzle platformer with a new character named Luna. Its sequel, Mighty Switch Force!, was released on the 3DS eShop on December 22, 2011. In 2013, another sequel titled Mighty Switch Force! 2 released on the Nintendo 3DS' eShop.

Adventure Time: Hey Ice King! Why'd You Steal Our Garbage?! was released on November 20, 2012. A sequel, Adventure Time: Explore the Dungeon Because I Don't Know!, as well as Regular Show: Mordecai and Rigby in 8-Bit Land, were released in 2013. A sequel to Mighty Switch Force! was released on June 13, 2013. A new Shantae game was revealed via Nintendo Power, Shantae and the Pirate's Curse, which was released on October 23, 2014, on the Nintendo 3DS and Wii U eShop. Another game in the series, Shantae: Half-Genie Hero, was crowdfunded via Kickstarter and released in December 2016. On April Fool's Day 2013, Wayforward made a fake announcement for a game called Cat Girl Without Salad! Fans responded positively to the game's concept, leading WayForward to later develop it into a full title, which was released via a Humble Bundle in June 2016. In May 2017, Wayforward published the PlayStation 4 and Xbox One ports of Last Dimension's Mystik Belle.

In August 2025, WayForward announced a collaboration with ModRetro, a manufacturer of FPGA based Game Boy Color clone consoles owned by Palmer Luckey, to re-release Sabrina: The Animated Series - Zapped!. The announcement of this partnership received significant backlash on social media, with users bringing up Palmer's pro-Donald Trump statements and his military manufacturing company Anduril Industries. WayForward initially deleted the posts announcing the partnership, clarifying that the rights holders of Sabrina, Archie Comics, were responsible for the deal with Palmer, and that they would not be receiving any royalties for each unit sold, however they later deleted the posts clarifying things, leading users to suspect WayForward was in fact in on the deal.

== Games ==
| Year | Title | Platforms | Co-produced with | Ref. |
|---|---|---|---|---|
| 1992 | FunPack | PC | Various | |
| 1993 | My Paint! The Animated Paint Program | Sega CD | Saddleback | |
| 1993 | Mickey's Ultimate Challenge | Genesis | Designer Software, High Tech Expressions | |
| 1994 | Math Challenge! | PC | Thinking Cap Software | |
| 1996 | Marvel Super Heroes: Amazing Math | PC | Brighter Child Interactive | |
| 1996 | Kid Pack 2 Deluxe | PC | WizardWorks | |
| 1997 | An American Tail: Animated MovieBook | Windows | Sound Source Interactive | |
| 1997 | Muppet Kids: Reading and Thinking Series | PC | Brighter Child Interactive, Jim Henson Interactive | |
| 1997 | Star Warped | PC | Parroty Interactive, Palladium Interactive | |
| 1997 | The X-Fools: The Spoof Is Out There | PC | Parroty Interactive, Palladium Interactive | |
| 1997 | Final Conflict | PC | R.I. Sound Systems, Sound Source Interactive | |
| 1998 | Lost in Space: Animated Math Adventure | PC | Sound Source Interactive | |
| 1998 | Casper: A Spirited Beginning Activity Center | PC | Sound Source Interactive | |
| 1998 | Babe: Animated Early Reader | PC | Sound Source Interactive | |
| 1998 | Microshaft Winblows 98 | PC | Parroty Interactive, Palladium Interactive | |
| 1998 | Way Point Zeta | PC | Elpin Systems | |
| 1999 | Xtreme Sports Arcade: Summer Edition | PC | WizardWorks | |
| 1999 | The Land Before Time: Preschool Adventure | PC | Sound Source Interactive | |
| 1999 | Bear in the Big Blue House: Bear's Sense of Adventure | Windows | Knowledge Adventure, Jim Henson Interactive | |
| 1999 | The King and I: Animated Thinking Adventure | PC | Sound Source Interactive | |
| 1999 | Life's Little Lessons with The Berenstain Bears | PC | Sound Source Interactive | |
| 1999 | KISS Trivia Challenge | PC | Running Dog Software, WizardWorks | |
| 1999 | Super Scattergories | PC | Cyberdice Interactive, Hasbro Interactive | |
| 1999 | Howard Marks Video Casino Games | PC | Hasbro Interactive | |
| 1999 | FunPack 3D | PC | WizardWorks | |
| 2000 | GAMES Interactive 2 | PC | Encore Software | |
| 2000 | Kaplan Essential Reviews [2001] | PC | Kaplan | |
| 2000 | GAMES Interactive | PC | Encore Software | |
| 2000 | WCW Mayhem | Game Boy Color | 2N Productions, Electronic Arts | |
| 2000 | Xtreme Sports | Game Boy Color, Nintendo Switch | Infogrames (GBC version) Self-published (Switch version) | |
| 2000 | Wendy: Every Witch Way | Game Boy Color | TDK Mediactive | |
| 2000 | Sabrina: The Animated Series: Zapped! | Game Boy Color | Simon & Schuster | |
| 2001 | Pearl Harbor: Defend the Fleet | Windows | Running Dog Software, WizardWorks | |
| 2001 | WWF Betrayal | Game Boy Color | THQ | |
| 2001 | Sabrina: The Animated Series: Spooked! | Game Boy Color | Simon & Schuster | |
| 2002 | The Scorpion King: Sword of Osiris | Game Boy Advance | Universal Interactive | |
| 2002 | Shantae | Game Boy Color, Nintendo Switch, PlayStation 4, PlayStation 5 | Capcom (GBC version) Self-published (Switch and PlayStation versions) | |
| 2002 | Godzilla: Domination | Game Boy Advance | Atari | |
| 2002 | Pacific Gunner | PC | Infogrames | |
| 2003 | Rescue Heroes: Billy Blazes | Game Boy Advance | VU Games | |
| 2003 | Nickelodeon Toon Twister 3D | Windows | Scholastic, Inc. | |
| 2004 | Barbie: The Princess and the Pauper | Game Boy Advance | VU Games | |
| 2004 | The SpongeBob SquarePants Movie | Game Boy Advance | THQ | |
| 2004 | Ping Pals | Nintendo DS | THQ | |
| 2005 | Cosmic Math | Leapster | LeapFrog | |
| 2005 | Letterpillar | Leapster | LeapFrog | |
| 2005 | Number Raiders | Leapster | LeapFrog | |
| 2005 | Word Chasers | Leapster | LeapFrog | |
| 2005 | The Batman: Multiply, Divide and Conquer | Leapster | LeapFrog | |
| 2005 | Teenage Mutant Ninja Turtles: Battle for the City | TV Game | Tech2Go | |
| 2005 | Sigma Star Saga | Game Boy Advance | Atari, Namco | |
| 2005 | Barbie and the Magic of Pegasus | Game Boy Advance | VU Games | |
| 2005 | Tak: The Great Juju Challenge | Game Boy Advance | THQ | |
| 2005 | Looney Tunes Double Pack: Dizzy Driving / Acme Antics | Game Boy Advance | Warner Bros. Interactive Entertainment, Majesco, THQ | |
| 2005 | SpongeBob SquarePants: Lights, Camera, Pants! | Game Boy Advance | THQ | |
| 2006 | Teenage Mutant Ninja Turtles: Mutant & Monster Mayhem | TV Game | Tech2Go | |
| 2006 | X-Men: The Official Game | Game Boy Advance | Activision | |
| 2006 | Unfabulous | Game Boy Advance | THQ | |
| 2006 | American Dragon: Jake Long – Attack of the Dark Dragon | Nintendo DS | Buena Vista Games | |
| 2006 | American Dragon: Jake Long – Rise of the Huntsclan | Game Boy Advance | Buena Vista Games | |
| 2006 | SpongeBob SquarePants: Creature from the Krusty Krab | Game Boy Advance, Nintendo DS | THQ | |
| 2006 | Justice League Heroes: The Flash | Game Boy Advance | Warner Bros. Interactive Entertainment | |
| 2006 | Barbie in the 12 Dancing Princesses | Game Boy Advance, Nintendo DS | Activision | |
| 2007 | God of War: Betrayal | JAVA ME | Javaground, Sony Online Entertainment, Sony Pictures Digital | |
| 2007 | Looney Tunes: Duck Amuck | Nintendo DS | Warner Bros. Interactive Entertainment | |
| 2007 | Shrek: Ogres & Dronkeys | Nintendo DS | Activision | |
| 2007 | Contra 4 | Nintendo DS | Konami | |
| 2008 | SpongeBob Squarepants: Fists of Foam | Leapfrog Didj, Leapster Explorer | LeapFrog | |
| 2008 | Nicktoons: Android Invasion | Leapfrog Didj | LeapFrog | |
| 2009 | LIT [WiiWare] | WiiWare | Self-published | |
| 2009 | Mighty Flip Champs! | DSiWare | Self-published | |
| 2009 | Baseball Blast! | Wii | Activision | |
| 2009 | A Boy and His Blob | Wii, Nintendo Switch | Majesco (Wii version) Ziggurat Interactive (Switch version) | |
| 2009 | Where the Wild Things Are | Nintendo DS | Warner Bros. Interactive Entertainment | |
| 2009 | Space Chimps | Nintendo DS | Brash Entertainment | |
| 2009 | Barbie and the Three Musketeers | Nintendo DS, Wii, Windows | Activision | |
| 2010 | Galactic Taz Ball | Nintendo DS | Warner Bros. Interactive Entertainment | |
| 2010 | Despicable Me: The Game - Minion Mayhem | Nintendo DS | D3 Publisher | |
| 2010 | Batman: The Brave and the Bold – The Videogame | Wii, Nintendo DS | Warner Bros. Interactive Entertainment | |
| 2010 | Shantae: Risky's Revenge | DSiWare, iOS | Self-published | |
| 2011 | Thor: God of Thunder | Nintendo DS | Sega | |
| 2011 | Mighty Milky Way | DSiWare | Self-published | |
| 2011 | SpongeBob SquigglePants | Nintendo 3DS, Wii | THQ | |
| 2011 | Mighty Flip Champs! DX | PlayStation Minis | Self-published | |
| 2011 | BloodRayne: Betrayal | Xbox 360, PlayStation 3, Windows | Majesco | |
| 2011 | Aliens: Infestation | Nintendo DS | Sega | |
| 2011 | Centipede: Infestation | Nintendo 3DS, Wii | Atari | |
| 2011 | Happy Feet Two: The Video Game | Nintendo DS, Nintendo 3DS | Warner Bros. Interactive Entertainment | |
| 2011 | Mighty Switch Force! | Nintendo 3DS | Self-published | |
| 2012 | iCarly: Groovy Foodie! | Nintendo DS | D3 Publisher | |
| 2012 | Double Dragon Neon | Xbox 360, PlayStation 3, Nintendo Switch | Majesco, Arc System Works | |
| 2012 | Hotel Transylvania | Nintendo DS, Nintendo 3DS | GameMill Entertainment | |
| 2012 | Silent Hill: Book of Memories | PlayStation Vita | Konami | |
| 2012 | Lalaloopsy: Carnival of Friends | Nintendo DS | Activision | |
| 2012 | Adventure Time: Hey Ice King! Why'd You Steal Our Garbage?! | Nintendo DS, Nintendo 3DS | D3 Publisher | |
| 2013 | Mighty Switch Force! 2 | Wii U, Nintendo 3DS | Self-published | |
| 2013 | The Smurfs 2 | PlayStation 3, Wii, Wii U, Xbox 360 | Ubisoft | |
| 2013 | DuckTales: Remastered | Wii U, Xbox 360, PlayStation 3, Windows, iOS, Android, Windows Phone | Capcom | |
| 2013 | Regular Show: Mordecai and Rigby in 8-Bit Land | Nintendo 3DS | D3 Publisher | |
| 2013 | Adventure Time: Explore the Dungeon Because I Don't Know! | Wii U, PlayStation 3, Xbox 360, Windows, Nintendo 3DS | D3 Publisher | |
| 2013 | Mighty Switch Force! Hyper Drive Edition | Wii U, Windows | Intergrow | |
| 2014 | Transformers: Rise of the Dark Spark | Nintendo 3DS | Activision | |
| 2014 | Scooby Doo! & Looney Tunes Cartoon Universe: Adventure | Windows, Nintendo 3DS | Warner Bros. Interactive Entertainment | |
| 2014 | Wonder Momo: Typhoon Booster | Nvidia Shield, Mac OS | Bandai-Namco | |
| 2014 | Til Morning's Light | Apple Store, iOS, Fire OS | Amazon | |
| 2014 | Shantae and the Pirate's Curse | Wii U, PlayStation 4, PlayStation 5, Xbox One, Nintendo 3DS, Windows, Amazon Fire TV, Nintendo Switch | Self-published | |
| 2014 | Teenage Mutant Ninja Turtles: Danger of the Ooze | PlayStation 3, Xbox 360, Nintendo 3DS | Activision | |
| 2014 | Adventure Time: The Secret of the Nameless Kingdom | PlayStation 3, PlayStation Vita, Xbox 360, Nintendo 3DS, Windows | Little Orbit, Bandai-Namco | |
| 2015 | Mighty Switch Force! Hose It Down! | iOS, Windows | Self-published | |
| 2015 | Watch Quest! Heroes of Time | Apple Watch | Self-published | |
| 2015 | Shantae: Risky's Revenge - Director's Cut | Windows, PlayStation 4, PlayStation 5, Wii U, Nintendo Switch, Xbox One | Self-published | |
| 2015 | Adventure Time: Puzzle Quest | iOS, Android | D3 Publisher | |
| 2015 | Goosebumps | PlayStation 3, PlayStation 4, Xbox 360, Xbox One, Nintendo 3DS, Windows, Nintendo Switch | Gamemill | |
| 2015 | Marvel Puzzle Quest: Dark Reign | PlayStation 3, PlayStation 4, Xbox 360, Xbox One | Demiurge Studios, D3 Publisher | |
| 2015 | LIT [2015] | iOS, Android, Windows | Self-published | |
| 2015 | Descendants | iOS, Android | Disney Interactive | |
| 2015 | Mighty Switch Force! Academy | Windows | Self-published | |
| 2016 | Cat Girl Without Salad: Amuse-Bouche | Windows, Nintendo Switch | Humble Bundle (PC version) Self-published (Switch version) | |
| 2016 | Indie Stars: Double-Pack! | Windows | Legacy Games | |
| 2016 | Shantae: Half-Genie Hero | Wii U, PlayStation 4, PlayStation Vita, Xbox One, Windows | Xseed Games | |
| 2017 | Mystik Belle | PlayStation 4, Xbox One | Last Dimension | |
| 2017 | The Mummy Demastered | PlayStation 4, Xbox One, Windows, Nintendo Switch | Self-published | |
| 2018 | Shantae: Half-Genie Hero Ultimate Edition | PlayStation 5, Nintendo Switch, Stadia | Self-published | |
| 2019 | Mighty Switch Force! Collection | PlayStation 4, Xbox One, Windows, Nintendo Switch | Self-published | |
| 2019 | River City Girls | PlayStation 4, PlayStation 5, Xbox One, Windows, Nintendo Switch, Android | Arc System Works | |
| 2019 | Spidersaurs | Apple Arcade, PlayStation 4, PlayStation 5, Xbox One, Xbox Series X/S, Windows, Nintendo Switch, Android | Self-published | |
| 2019 | Miraculous Crush | iOS, Android | Self-published | |
| 2020 | Shantae and the Seven Sirens | Apple Arcade, PlayStation 4, PlayStation 5, Xbox One, Windows, Nintendo Switch | Self-published | |
| 2020 | Marble Knights (now discontinued) | Apple Arcade | Apple Inc. | |
| 2020 | Vitamin Connection | Nintendo Switch | Self-published | |
| 2020 | Trollhunters: Defenders of Arcadia | PlayStation 4, Xbox One, Windows, Nintendo Switch | Outright Games | |
| 2020 | Bakugan: Champions of Vestroia | Nintendo Switch | Warner Bros. Interactive Entertainment | |
| 2021 | BloodRayne Betrayal: Fresh Bites | PlayStation 4, PlayStation 5, Xbox One, Xbox Series X/S, Windows, Nintendo Switch | Ziggurat Interactive | |
| 2022 | River City Girls Zero | PlayStation 4, Xbox One, Nintendo Switch | Arc System Works | |
| 2022 | Dawn of the Monsters | PlayStation 4, PlayStation 5, Xbox One, Xbox Series X/S, Windows, Nintendo Switch | 13AM Games | |
| 2022 | RWBY: Arrowfell | PlayStation 4, PlayStation 5, Xbox One, Xbox Series X/S, Windows, Nintendo Switch | Arc System Works, Rooster Teeth Games | |
| 2022 | River City Girls 2 | PlayStation 4, PlayStation 5, Xbox One, Xbox Series X/S, Windows, Nintendo Switch | Arc System Works | |
| 2023 | Lunark | macOS, Windows, Xbox One, Xbox Series X/S, Nintendo Switch, PlayStation 4, PlayStation 5 | Canari Games | |
| 2023 | Advance Wars 1+2: Re-Boot Camp | Nintendo Switch | Nintendo | |
| 2024 | Contra: Operation Galuga | Nintendo Switch, PlayStation 5, Xbox Series X/S, Windows | Konami | |
| 2024 | Rose & Camellia Collection | Nintendo Switch | Nigoro | |
| 2024 | Yars Rising | Atari VCS, Nintendo Switch, PlayStation 4, PlayStation 5, Xbox One, Xbox Series X/S, Windows | Atari | |
| 2024 | RetroRealms | PlayStation 4, PlayStation 5, Xbox One, Xbox Series X/S, Windows, Nintendo Switch | Boss Team Games | |
| 2024 | Clock Tower | PlayStation 4, PlayStation 5, Xbox One, Xbox Series X/S, Windows, Nintendo Switch | Limited Run Games, Human Entertainment | |
| 2024 | River City Girls 2: Double Dragon DLC | PlayStation 4, PlayStation 5, Xbox One, Xbox Series X/S, Windows, Nintendo Switch | Arc System Works | |
| 2025 | Shantae Advance: Risky Revolution | Game Boy Advance, Nintendo Switch, PlayStation 4, PlayStation 5, Xbox One, Xbox Series X/S, Windows | Limited Run Games (GBA and physical PC, Switch, PlayStation and xbox versions) Self-published (Steam and digital Switch, PlayStation and xbox versions) | |
| 2025 | Sigma Star Saga DX | Game Boy Advance, Nintendo Switch, PlayStation 5, Windows | Limited Run Games (GBA and physical PC, Switch, PlayStation and xbox versions) Self-published (Steam and digital Switch, PlayStation and xbox versions) | |
| 2027 | Shantae 7 | | | |

=== Cancelled game ===
A plan for a Shantae sequel was Shantae: Risky Waters, a game planned for the GameCube, a rafting game, it was based on the GameCube controller as feeling like the left and right triggers with analog resistance in them. Plans were scrapped after WayForward failed to find a publisher. Eventually, WayForward ended up being able to self-publish all Shantae sequels, starting with Risky's Revenge, although the GBA version and physical console and PC ports of Shantae Advance were handled by Limited Run Games.
