= Cartoon Network: Battle Crashers =

2016 video game

- Developer: Magic Pockets (Note: Ported to the Nintendo Switch by Torus Games.)
- Publishers: NA: GameMill Entertainment; EU: Maximum Games
- Composers: Allister Brimble, Anthony N. Putson
- Platforms: Nintendo 3DS; PlayStation 4; Xbox One; Nintendo Switch
- Release: Nintendo 3DS, PlayStation 4, Xbox One; 8 November 2016; Nintendo Switch 31 October 2017
- Genre: Beat 'em up
- Modes: Single-player, multiplayer

Cartoon Network: Battle Crashers is a side-scrolling beat 'em up video game based on multiple Cartoon Network series developed by French studio Magic Pockets and published by GameMill Entertainment in the North American release and Maximum Games in the European release. It was released for Nintendo 3DS, PlayStation 4, and Xbox One on 8 November 2016. The game features characters from various Cartoon Network shows, including Adventure Time, The Amazing World of Gumball, Clarence, Regular Show, Steven Universe, and Uncle Grandpa.

The game received negative reviews from several video game journalists, who panned it as a repetitive and boring beat 'em up with bland representations of otherwise unique characters. A port for the Nintendo Switch was released on 31 October 2017.

== Plot ==
Uncle Grandpa is driving his RV when he accidentally gears it to smash through the universes of other Cartoon Network shows, unknowingly picking up Gumball, Clarence, Steven Universe, Mordecai and Rigby from Regular Show, and Finn and Jake from Adventure Time. They then have to set out to defeat an army of "Mirror Clones", evil shard clones presumably formed after breaking through the dimensions.

== Gameplay ==
The player takes control of six characters from various Cartoon Network shows: Uncle Grandpa, Gumball, Clarence, Steven Universe, Mordecai and Rigby, and Finn and Jake. Each character has a unique set of attacks and abilities. They progress through six worlds based on their respective series, each of which has two normal levels and a boss fight. Each normal level also has a secret bonus room that requires one of the characters' abilities to access. Sometimes, the player is required to replay a previous level in one of three special modes to collect a hidden item needed to advance.

The levels consist of going through an area and defeating enemies, from which the characters can collect gems and gain new abilities. Throughout the levels are hazards emanating from piles of shards that can be cleared by a certain character's abilities. The characters, who have their respective health bars, can pick up health-restoring items and special power-ups like walkie-talkies. The game can be played in local co-op with up to four players.

== Development ==
The game was announced on 17 August 2016. A trailer for the game was released the same day.

== Reception ==
Reception

Aggregate score
Aggregator	Score
Metacritic	21/100

Review scores
Publication	Score
Destructoid	1.5/10
Nintendo Life	4/10
Nintendo World Report	(3DS) 2/10 (NS) 3/10
Daily Mirror	1/5
PlayStation LifeStyle	3/10

Cartoon Network: Battle Crashers received negative reviews from several video game critics for mainly being a monotonous and boring beat-'em-up title with a lack of representation of the unique personalities and traits of each playable character. The review aggregator website Metacritic gave the game a simplified rating of 21 out of 100, indicating "generally unfavorable reviews"; it is the lowest-rated Nintendo 3DS game on the website. A reviewer for the Daily Mirror described it as a "glorified browser flash game," and wrote that "Real talent goes into making something this bland out of characters as interesting as these." PlayStation LifeStyle was another publication that wrote it had the feel of a cheaply-made flash game: "Quite frankly, this feels like a Flash or Unity game, that someone decided to greenlight as a full console release."

Specific criticisms include a small number of types of enemies that are defeated primarily with button mashing; forgettable background music and sound effects; lack of dialogue, including a complete absence of voice acting; lack of personality for the playable characters and NPCs; unbalanced character attacks, with characters other than Finn and Jake being near-useless aside from clearing hazards; and low difficulty. Some reviewers also criticized the padding of the game's length due to the fact that the player has to replay certain stages just to get an otherwise useless hidden item. Jed Whitaker of Destructoid also noted that the game significantly deviated from its source material, and was especially harsh towards the treatment of Steven Universe material in the game — for example, he disliked the fact that Steven's primary attack in the game is a bubble, while in the actual show, the bubble is used only for protection or capturing corrupted gems, but never for attacking.
