= List of Bakugan Battle Brawlers video games =

This is a list of video games from the anime series Bakugan Battle Brawlers.

== Bakugan Battle Brawlers (2009) ==
Bakugan Battle Brawlers is a video game based on the original anime series made by NOW Production and Activision for the PlayStation 2, Nintendo DS and Wii, PlayStation 3 and Xbox 360. The game was released in September 2009.

== Bakugan Dimensions (2010) ==
Bakugan Dimensions
- Publisher: SpinMaster
- Platform: Microsoft Windows
- Release: June 1, 2010

Bakugan: Dimensions was a web-based massively multiplayer online game developed by Flying Lab Software. Players could battle each other and could obtain new Bakugan in-game using "DNA codes" found on real-life Bakugan toys. The game was only available for users from the U.S., Canada, and Australia. It closed down on June 30, 2011, for unknown reasons.

== Bakugan Battle Brawlers: Arcade Battler (2010) ==
An arcade game only available in Japan. Players can use their cards in the packs, which is very similar to the first video game. It is based on the anime's second season.

== Bakugan: Defenders of the Core (2010) ==
Bakugan: Defenders of the Core
- Publishers: JP: Sega; WW: Activision
- Platforms: Nintendo DS, PlayStation 3, PSP, Wii, Xbox 360
- Release: NA: December 15, 2010; AU: December 15, 2010 (DS, PS3, Wii, X360); EU: October 29, 2010; JP: December 9, 2010 (DS)

Bakugan: Defenders of the Core is a multi-console game, released in 2010. Despite its title, it is based on Bakugan: New Vestroia. It was released for the DS, Wii, PSP, PS3 and Xbox 360.

== Bakugan: Rise of the Resistance (2011) ==
Bakugan: Rise of the Resistance is a Nintendo DS game that was released in 2011.

== Bakugan: Champions of Vestroia (2020) ==
Bakugan: Champions of Vestroia is a Nintendo Switch game that was released in 2020. It was developed by WayForward and published by Warner Bros. Interactive Entertainment. The game received "mixed or average reviews", according to review aggregator Metacritic.
