= Mighty Milky Way =

2011 video game

- Mighty Milky Way cover art
- Developer: WayForward Technologies
- Publisher: WayForward Technologies
- Directors: Sean Velasco; James Montagna
- Artist: Erin Pellon
- Composer: Jake Kaufman
- Platform: Nintendo DSi
- Release: NA: May 9, 2011; EU: May 27, 2011
- Genres: Action, puzzle
- Mode: Single-player

Mighty Milky Way was a 2011 puzzle video game developed and published by WayForward Technologies for the Nintendo DSi's DSiWare service. It was the second title after Mighty Flip Champs! in the Mighty series from WayForward Technologies. The game can no longer be downloaded, as DSiWare is discontinued.

== Gameplay ==
Mighty Milky Way tasks players with guiding Luna, a French-speaking extraterrestrial, safely towards a portal at the end of each level while avoiding enemies and electric barriers. Every level is filled with small planets, each with its own center of gravity, which Luna walks around clockwise at a speed controlled by the player. By kicking off of planets, in some cases destroying them, Luna can propel herself through space in a specific direction, sometimes swayed by another planet's gravity. Kicking off a planet also causes any enemies on it to fly off its orbit, which can be used to destroy other obstacles. By collecting pieces of candy, Luna can create additional planets to help her navigate difficult sections.

== Development ==
Mighty Milky Way was developed and published by WayForward Technologies for the Nintendo DSi, directed by Sean Velasco. It was originally conceived as an "experimental gameplay idea" for the DSi. Certain elements were established in this concept, including not controlling Luna. It was described as a "pseudo-sequel" to Mighty Flip Champs, citing both games having "sexy girl leads, loud colors, action puzzle gameplay, friendly monster co-stars, and a whimsically wacky attitude". The Milky title was chosen to ensure that these titles could stand together and stand apart from other games. Despite not being involved in the development of Flip Champs, Sean and the team sought to examine what made it unique and apply it to Milky Way. He said that the zooming in and out on the models was reminiscent of Mode 7 SNES games. The art for the game was done by Erin Pellon, who worked as a contract artist for the project, and whose first job was Mighty Milky Way. When designing Luna, Velasco said they wanted to evoke a "50's retro chic", noting that she became less retro as development progressed. Velasco noted that creative director Matt Bozon was fond of female leads, which influenced characters like Luna being a protagonist. The soundtrack was composed by Jake Kaufman, who also did the soundtrack for Flip Champs, both of which were released as part of the "Mighty Flip Champs & Mighty Milky Way Original Soundtrack". The game was released for download through DSiWare on May 9, 2011, in North America and May 27 in Europe. It was the last game officially released for the Nintendo DS in Japan. A remixed version of the game was featured at Game Night 6 at Giant Robot alongside other WayForward games, where players could play for only one night only.

== Reception and legacy ==
Reception

Aggregate score
Aggregator	Score
Metacritic	81/100

Review scores
Publication	Score
Destructoid	7.5/10
Edge	8/10
Eurogamer	7/10
IGN	8.5/10
NGamer	100%
Nintendo Life	9/10
Official Nintendo Magazine	74%

The game received "favorable" reviews according to the review aggregation website Metacritic. Reviewing for IGN, Lucas M. Thomas described the game as challenging, and praised its unusual design. Thomas said the game requires repeated attempts for each level but that "Mighty Milky Way's frustrations almost always feel like the good kind".
