= Adventure Time: Explore the Dungeon Because I Don't Know! =

2013 video game

- European box art
- Developer: WayForward Technologies
- Publishers: NA: D3 Publisher; PAL: Namco Bandai Games
- Director: Tomm Hulett
- Producers: Simon Lai; Aaron Blean
- Designers: Michael Herbster; Brody Brooks; Dwight Spaulding; Barrett Velia
- Programmer: David Ollman
- Artist: Jason Wright
- Writers: Pendleton Ward; Tomm Hulett; James Montagna
- Composers: Jake Kaufman; Ian Stocker
- Series: Adventure Time
- Platforms: PlayStation 3 Xbox 360; Windows; Nintendo 3DS; Wii U
- Release: PlayStation 3, Xbox 360: EU: November 15, 2013; NA: November 19, 2013; AU: November 21, 2013; Windows: WW: November 19, 2013; Nintendo 3DS, Wii U: NA: November 19, 2013; AU: December 12, 2013; EU: December 13, 2013
- Genre: Action-adventure

Adventure Time: Explore the Dungeon Because I Don't Know! (stylized as Adventure Time: Explore the Dungeon Because I DON'T KNOW!) is a 2013 action-adventure game developed by WayForward Technologies and published by D3 Publisher in North America and in PAL regions by Namco Bandai Games for PlayStation 3, Xbox 360, Windows, Nintendo 3DS, and Wii U. It is the second game based on the animated television series Adventure Time, following Hey Ice King! Why'd You Steal Our Garbage?!! (2012). The game includes voice acting from major characters and four-player cooperative multiplayer, except in the 3DS version, which has no multiplayer., the game received negative reviews from critics

The game was delisted from digital storefronts on March 31, 2018, due to licensing issues.

== Plot ==
The game begins with Princess Bubblegum entreating the player (as one of the various playable characters) to investigate the large and secret Royal Dungeon that lies below the Land of Ooo. Several prisoners have been escaping, but as the prison is supposed to be impossible to escape, Bubblegum is stumped as to how the prisoners are escaping and entreats the player to explore the dungeon because "I don't know". As the game progresses several characters are unlocked and become playable characters through various situations. It is briefly suspected that Ice King is releasing the prisoners, but he is shown to have only been in the dungeon to create large Fionna and Cake ice statues. The game eventually leads up to a battle between the player(s) and a giant pink blob that is revealed to be Princess Bubblegum's parents. About a thousand years ago she was gestated within the blob and was later expelled from its mass. Bubblegum explains that she grew up to become more independent and became a princess. She kept the blob in the Royal Dungeon, but over time the mass expanded and inadvertently released the prisoners. This causes the Ice King to angrily demand to know how old Bubblegum is and she replies that she is 827 years old, which horrifies him. Finn questions Bubblegum's rationale for covering up the secret of her parents, only for Marceline to defend Bubblegum by saying that the others would have done the same for their parents. However, as a result of the player's fight against the blob, it is unable to reform and turns into a set of bubbles, one of which kisses Bubblegum on the cheek.

== Gameplay ==
=== Playable characters ===
Players are able to play as Finn, Jake, Marceline, Ice King, Cinnamon Bun, Flame Princess, Lumpy Space Princess, and Lemongrab. Peppermint Butler, Gunter, and Abraham Lincoln were released as DLC for users that purchased the game via Steam. Each playable character has their own special attack, which can be used to various effects, such as damaging enemies or regaining health. Peppermint Butler, Abraham Lincoln, and Gunter were later added as DLC in the console versions.

=== Gameplay ===
The game is a top-down, isometric hack and slash dungeon crawler, similar to games in the Diablo franchise. Players can collect treasure while in the dungeon that they can later use to upgrade the stats of the various playable characters, interact with other characters, and purchase goods from the game's ubiquitous item vendor; in this case played by one of the cartoon's minor characters, Choose Goose.

== Reception ==
Reception

Aggregate scores
Aggregator	Score
GameRankings	(PS3) 37.80% (X360) 50.71% (Wii U) 46.33% (3DS) 32.25%
Metacritic	(PS3) 40/100 (X360) 47/100 (Wii U) 40/100 (3DS) 33/100

Review scores
Publication	Score
Destructoid	2/10
Eurogamer	4/10
GameSpot	2/10
GamesRadar+	2/5
IGN	3.5/10
Official Xbox Magazine (US)	4.5/10
Hardcore Gamer	3/5

Adventure Time: Explore the Dungeon Because I Don't Know! received "unfavorable" reviews on all platforms besides the PC according to the review aggregation website Metacritic. The most common criticism centers upon the repetitive gameplay, the lackluster story, the poor graphics, and an overall lack of depth. Destructoid panned the game, writing that the 3DS version's "presentation is lazy, lackluster, and shameful" and that it was overall "a disaster". Carolyn Petit of GameSpot was also highly critical of the game, calling it "dungeon-crawling at its dullest and most rudimentary" and stating that "the much bigger I DON'T KNOW here is why anyone would play this game." GamesRadar criticized the game's map layout system, as they felt that it was "very easy to lose track of where you've already been" and that it made the game more tedious due to players having to retread the same area in order to discover the level's exit. Hardcore Gamer was impressed by the game's initial charm but disappointed in most other aspects criticizing the "barebones plot, veritable lack of [overall] charm and frustrating hit detection" Eurogamer expressed disappointment over the game's treatment of the "surprisingly deep lore that has grown around [Adventure Time]", as it "simply drapes an Adventure Time skin over established gameplay tropes, reflecting the source material without truly adapting it."
