= Mighty Switch Force! 2 =

2013 video game

- Developer: WayForward Technologies
- Publisher: WayForward Technologies: JP: Intergrow
- Director: Matt Bozon
- Designers: Matt Bozon; Chris Schroeder
- Programmer: Larry Holdaway
- Artist: Henk Nieborg
- Composer: Jake Kaufman
- Series: Mighty
- Engine: EngineBlack
- Platforms: Nintendo 3DS, Wii U
- Release: Nintendo 3DS: NA: June 13, 2013; PAL: June 27, 2013; JP: October 5, 2016; Wii U: NA: October 17, 2013; PAL: October 24, 2013
- Genres: Action, puzzle, platformer
- Mode: Single-player

Mighty Switch Force! 2 is a 2013 puzzle platform video game developed and published by WayForward Technologies for the Nintendo 3DS. It is the fourth game in WayForward's Mighty series and the sequel to 2011's Mighty Switch Force!. The game was released on the Nintendo eShop on June 13, 2013 in North America and in the PAL regions on June 27. The game was later released for the Wii U in October the same year. A puzzle game using similar elements and assets, Mighty Switch Force! Hose It Down!, was released for iOS on February 12, 2015 and for Microsoft Windows on June 4.

Mighty Switch Force! 2 was followed in 2015 by the third game in the Mighty Switch Force trilogy, Mighty Switch Force! Academy.

== Gameplay ==
Gameplay follows a similar premise to the previous game in which players assume the role of Patricia Wagon, who is now a firefighter that must rescue the Hooligan Sisters of the last game from blazing fires. Like the previous game, players are tasked with using Patricia's ability to push blocks in and out of the foreground in order to rescue the Hooligan Sisters and reach the extraction point as quickly as possible. This time around, Patricia's blaster from the previous game has been replaced by a new dousing apparatus that shoots a spray of water, which can be used to defeat enemies and put out fires. This new mechanic adds various new types of blocks to the mix, such as mud blocks that must be dissolved with water, pipe blocks that redirect the spray of water and wooden blocks that must be burned in order to destroy. Along with par times that the player may attempt to beat, each level also contains a hidden "U.S.B" baby they may try to locate.

== Plot ==
The "Galactic Fire Brigade" issues a code red: Tangent City is spontaneously combusting and everything is catching ablaze. Patrica "Patty" Wagon must help as a firefighter, using the issued Infinity Dousing Apparatus, and rescue the Hooligan Sisters, who have been reformed since their capture, and are stuck in the infernos within Tangent City. At the same time, HQ has picked up cries of a distressed infant dubbed the "Ugly Secret Baby", or, "U.S.B". The "Rapid Sparkle Transmission System" usually used to extrapolate people was made for use on adults, so Patty must find an alternative transport means (she achieves this by kicking the babies off screen, in-game).

Patty travels across Tangent City and rescues the Hooligan Sisters while tackling fires. Eventually Patty reaches the cause of the fires, a giant dragon creature, which has now swallowed the Hooligan Sisters. Patty defeats the dragon, rescuing the Hooligan Sisters, and restoring peace.

Patty and the Hooligan Sisters celebrate with a pool-side party. Patty is initially shown stripped down to her gym clothes (akin to in the first game's ending screen), before she is revealed to have a fully robotic skeleton.

== Reception ==
Mighty Switch Force! 2

Aggregate score
Aggregator	Score	
Aggregator	3DS	Wii U
Metacritic	73/100	74/100

Review scores
Publication	Score	
Publication	3DS	Wii U
Destructoid	7.5/10	N/A
Edge	6/10	N/A
GamesMaster	68%	N/A
GamesTM	6/10	N/A
GameZone	8/10	N/A
Nintendo Life	7/10	8/10
Nintendo World Report	8/10	N/A
Official Nintendo Magazine	73%	N/A
Pocket Gamer	4/5	N/A

Mighty Switch Force! 2 received "average" reviews on both platforms according to the review aggregation website Metacritic. Destructoid praised the gameplay of the 3DS version but lamented its short length, a fault shared by the game's predecessor.

=== Meme ===
In 2020, the main vocal theme of Mighty Switch Force! 2, "Rescue Girl", gained attention beyond the niche of Mighty Switch Force! after it was used in a viral video meme called "May 2020" that mocked the idea that 2020 could not 'get any worse' with the hypothetical return of a dancing Adolf Hitler.

== Mighty Switch Force! Hose It Down! ==
Mighty Switch Force! Hose It Down!
- Developer: WayForward Technologies
- Publisher: WayForward Technologies
- Director: James Montagna
- Producer: Christopher Shanley
- Designer: Michael Herbster
- Programmer: Adam Rademacher
- Artist: Henk Nieborg
- Composer: Jake Kaufman
- Series: Mighty
- Platforms: iOS, Microsoft Windows
- Release: iOS; February 12, 2015; Windows; June 4, 2015
- Genre: puzzle
- Mode: Single-player

Mighty Switch Force! Hose It Down! is a puzzle video game developed by WayForward Technologies, originally released for iOS on February 12, 2015, and later ported for Microsoft Windows via Steam on June 4. It is the first spin-off in the Mighty series and was made using the same elements, assets and music as Mighty Switch Force! 2.

=== Gameplay ===
The gameplay is inspired by classic puzzle games like Pipe Mania. The players have to order a set number of various directional pipe blocks, that are given at every stage around the playfield, in order to redirect the water fired by Patricia's dousing apparatus so it can put down fire blocks and dissolve mud blocks. There are also certain levels where a reformed Hooligan Sister is trapped somewhere around the level and the player is tasked to put down the flames and open a path using the pipe blocks so that she can escape. Each level also has par times that the player may attempt to beat.

=== Reception ===
Mighty Switch Force! Hose It Down!

Aggregate score
Aggregator	Score
Metacritic	63/100

Review scores
Publication	Score
Gamezebo	3.5/5
Pocket Gamer	2/5
TouchArcade	2.5/5

The iOS version received "mixed" reviews according to Metacritic. Gamezebo praised the gameplay and feel of the iOS version. Criticism was aimed at the repetition of some levels in order to get the par times and the idea of having to pay an extra dollar to unlock more stages.
