= Skyboard (glider) =

Skyboard is a one-person glider that offers a highly manoeuvrable alternative to skydiving. It was invented by the New Zealander Bob Harris. The Skyboard is a 2.3 metres (7 ft 7 in) long capsule, in which a pilot lies face down with hands on controls that offer full flying functions. On being launched from between 10,000 ft and 35,000 ft from either a fixed-wing aircraft or a helicopter Skyboard's front and rear wings, and tail plane are electronically deployed. The pilot, using aileron and elevator control surfaces can then fly the glider before making a wheels-down or parachute-assisted landing.

== See also ==
- List of gliders
