= Wizards Only, Fools =

- Adventure Time episode
- Episode no.: Season 5 Episode 26
- Directed by: Nate Cash (Note: Supervising director); Nick Jennings (Note: Art director)
- Written by: Jesse Moynihan; Thomas Wellmann
- Story by: Adam Muto; Kent Osborne; Pendleton Ward; Jesse Moynihan
- Production code: 1014-134
- Original air date: July 1, 2013
- Running time: 11 minutes

Guest appearances
- Duncan Trussell as Ron James; Maurice LaMarche as Grand Master Wizard

Episode chronology
← Previous "Candy Streets"	Next → "Jake Suit"
- Adventure Time season 5

"Wizards Only, Fools" is the twenty-sixth episode of the fifth season of the American animated television series Adventure Time. The episode was written and storyboarded by Jesse Moynihan and Thomas Wellmann, from a story by Adam Muto, Kent Osborne, Pendleton Ward, and Moynihan. It originally aired on Cartoon Network on July 1, 2013. The episode guest stars Duncan Trussell as Ron James and Maurice LaMarche as Grand Master Wizard.

The series follows the adventures of Finn (voiced by Jeremy Shada), a human boy, and his best friend and adoptive brother Jake (voiced by John DiMaggio), a dog with magical powers to change shape and grow and shrink at will. In this episode, Finn, Jake, and Princess Bubblegum (voiced by Hynden Walch) disguise themselves as wizards and sneak into Wizard City after Starchy (voiced by Tom Kenny) comes down with a cold and needs a magical cure. However, Bubblegum keeps insisting to everyone that magic is just a mystical way of explaining the world, and that scientism is the superior epistemological view. The three, along with Abracadaniel (voiced by Steve Little) are eventually arrested for impersonating wizards, but manage to break out of prison with the help of a "cold" spell that literally produces cold weather.

"Wizards Only, Fools" was the second and final episode of the series to have been storyboarded by Wellmann, a cartoonist from Germany. He and Moynihan worked on the episode via e-mail and Skype. Thematically, the episode explores the conflict between religion and science, with the former symbolically represented in the episode as magic. On the day of its airing, it was seen by 2.5 million viewers and ranked as the second-highest rated Cartoon Network series. The episode received largely positive reception from critics, and series' art director Nick Jennings later won an Emmy Award for his work on the episode.

== Plot ==
Finn, Jake, and Princess Bubblegum disguise themselves as wizards and sneak into Wizard City in order to secure a spell to cure a cold that is plaguing Starchy (a sentient malt ball, voiced by Tom Kenny), who does not want medical treatment. They approach potion-seller Ron James (voiced by Duncan Trussell), but he sees through their charade and calls the wizard police on the trio. Finn, Jake, and Bubblegum steal a cold spell and then run from the scene of the crime. After a long chase, the three run into Abracadaniel (a meek and somewhat feeble-powered wizard with whom the three are familiar, voiced by Steve Little), who is accidentally roped into their conspiracy. The four are soon arrested and stand trial before the Grand Master Wizard (voiced by Maurice LaMarche), who offers to let all of them go free if Princess Bubblegum will concede that "wizards rule".

However, Bubblegum stubbornly refuses; she finds that the wizards' insistence on defining the unknown and fantastic as "magic" flies in the face of the scientific method. The Grand Master Wizard, angered, sentences all four to Wizard Prison. Once at the prison, Abracadaniel challenges Bubblegum to a knife fight. Bubblegum bests him, but refuses to kill him, which causes a riot. In midst of the fray, Finn and Jake learn that the cold spell, instead of curing a cold, actually produces ice; they creatively use it freeze the entire complex. Bubblegum, Finn, and Jake escape and return to the Candy Kingdom, where Bubblegum (with the help of Abracadaniel) distracts Starchy with magic while she administers a vaccine.

== Production ==
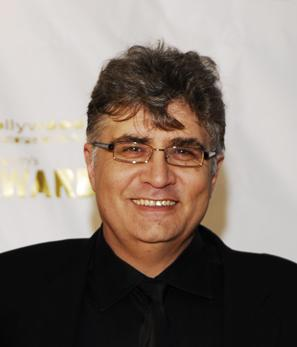
The episode guest stars Maurice LaMarche as the Grand Master Wizard.

"Wizards Only, Fools", which originally went under the production title of "Only Wizards Allowed", was written and storyboarded by Jesse Moynihan and German cartoonist Thomas Wellmann, from a story by series creator Pendleton Ward, Adam Muto, Kent Osborne, and Moynihan. This episode was the second and final installment of the series that Wellmann worked on, following the earlier season five episode "The Suitor". Wellmann had been asked to storyboard for the series following a chance meeting with members of the Adventure Time crew at the 2012 Toronto Comics Arts Festival. Whereas Wellmann felt "anxious and overwhelmed" while working on "The Suitor", he felt that he was "more releaxed" storyboarding "Wizards Only, Fools". Because Wellmann lives in Germany, he and Moynihan collaborated on the episode via e-mail and Skype. The episode guest stars comedians Duncan Trussell and Maurice LaMarche as Ron James and the Grand Master Wizard, respectively. Moynihan later noted on his personal website that he created the character of Ron James with Trussell specifically in mind.

== Themes ==
The episode explores the differences in scientific and religious perspectives by presenting the two sides as competing modes of discourse; Oliver Sava of The A.V. Club argues that magic users, such as Jake, stand "for magic and the wonderful unknown", whereas Bubblegum stands for "cold, hard facts". While Bubblegum is resistant to embrace magical ways of thinking, by the episode's end, she realizes that "magic has its uses". Moynihan later noted on his personal website that, "in helping to write the episode, it wasn't important (for me) to impart an idea of who is right or wrong about magic and science in the land of Ooo. It was important to impart the idea of a complex and contradictory fantasy." He later argued that using the "science v. religion" debate to backdrop an episode was enjoyable because it allowed him to have "fun with both sides of the perspective spectrum." Likewise, Wellmann thought the show's willingness to explore weighty subjects is one of the ways the show has been so successful. He wrote, "one of the biggest strengths of Adventure Time [is] that it's bold to explore topics like [...] science v. religion in a non-judging, open-minded way."

John V. Karavitis, in the chapter "The Finn-losophy of Adventure Time" from the book Adventure Time and Philosophy, sees the situation at hand in a different light. According to him, magic and science clearly exist within the confines of Ooo, but more importantly, they also represent two completely different ways of viewing the world. Science is a way of "observ[ing] the world, mak[ing] educated guesses about how it works and conduct[ing] expierments [...] in order to confirm or disprove our ideas about the world. [...] Science requires that we be rational, that we try to actively understand the world, and to take steps to verify our understanding." In this sense, it is ultimately the responsible perspective. Magic, on the other hand, is "the metaphysics of immaturity" because it does not require understanding the reality of the actual world. Magic, according to Karavitis, is therefore an irresponsible perspective to take.

== Reception ==
"Wizards Only, Fools" first aired on June 30, 2013 on Cartoon Network. The episode was watched by 2.5 million viewers, and received a 1.5 Nielsen household rating. Nielsen ratings are audience measurement systems that determine the audience size and composition of television programming in the United States, which means that the episode was seen by 1.5 percent of all households in the country at the time of the broadcast. The episode was the 2nd most-watched Cartoon Network program on the night it aired. The episode first saw physical release as part of the 2014 The Suitor DVD, which included 16 episodes from the series' first through fifth seasons. It was later re-released as part of the complete fifth season DVD in July 2015.

Sava awarded the episode an "A−", writing that "Wizards Only, Fools" is "one of those glorious episodes where the writers have a wealth of ideas that they are able to turn into one cohesive yet frantically madcap narrative, delivering an episode that provides mental stimulation for adults while satisfying all the sensory needs of children." He applauded the episode's humor, willingness to explore controversial ideas, and its set pieces. Specific praise went towards the episode's final act, which takes place in Wizard Prison, with Sava likening the act to the late-90s television series Oz.

For his work on the episode, former series' art director Nick Jennings won an Emmy for "Outstanding Individual Achievement In Animation", making it the series' second Emmy win.
