= Be More =

- Adventure Time episode
- Episode no.: Season 5 Episode 28
- Directed by: Nate Cash (Note: Supervising director); Nick Jennings (Note: Art director)
- Written by: Tom Herpich; Steve Wolfhard
- Story by: Patrick McHale; Kent Osborne; Pendleton Ward; Tom Herpich; Steve Wolfhard; Rebecca Sugar
- Original air date: July 22, 2013
- Running time: 11 minutes

Guest appearances
- Aziz Ansari as DMO; Paul F. Tompkins as SMO; Chuck McCann as Moe

Episode chronology
← Previous "Jake Suit"	Next → "Sky Witch"
- Adventure Time season 5

"Be More" is the twenty-eighth episode of the fifth season of the American animated television series Adventure Time. It was written and storyboarded by Tom Herpich and Steve Wolfhard, from a story by Patrick McHale, Kent Osborne, Pendleton Ward, Rebecca Sugar, Herpich, and Wolfhard. It originally aired on Cartoon Network on July 22, 2013. The episode guest stars Aziz Ansari as DMO, Paul F. Tompkins as the SMOs, and Chuck McCann as Moe.

The series follows the adventures of Finn (voiced by Jeremy Shada), a human boy, and his best friend and adoptive brother Jake (voiced by John DiMaggio), a dog with magical powers to change shape and grow and shrink at will. In this episode, BMO, Finn and Jake's sentient computer game, accidentally deletes a core system driver, forcing Finn and Jake to sneak into the MO factory in order to fix BMO. However, the three are pursued by security guard SMOs (voiced by Tompkins); Finn, Jake, and BMO eventually run into Moe Giovanni (voiced by McCann), the ancient and benevolent human-cyborg creator of the MOs, who explains BMO's backstory.

"Be More" was originally intended to have been produced during the series' third season, but was later moved to the series' fifth season, by which time it had changed substantially. It was viewed by 2.67 million viewers and received a 0.7 rating among adults between the ages of 18 and 49. The episode received largely positive critical reviews, with Oliver Sava from The A.V. Club applauding the extrapolation of BMOs backstory, as well as its potential for narrative expansions. The episode was later nominated for a Primetime Emmy Award for Short-format Animation at the 66th Primetime Emmy Awards, but lost to the Mickey Mouse episode "O Sole Minnie".

== Plot ==
While deleting files, BMO accidentally deletes its core system drivers. Finn and Jake decide to accompany BMO to the Mo Factory so that BMO can get the drivers re-installed; BMO cautions Finn and Jake that its memory will be erased, so the trio disguise themselves as FMO and JMO and successfully sneak past DMO (voiced by Aziz Ansari) and infiltrate the facility. Once inside, they find the factory derelict and abandoned. DMO and the security SMOs (voiced by Paul F. Tompkins) soon catch onto Finn, Jake, and BMO's scheme and give chase. The three evade security and sneak into the SMO lounge.

BMO hacks into one of the SMOs and learns the location of the core system driver installation deck. Once again, the SMOs give chase until Finn, Jake, and BMO reach the heart of the facility. There, the three meet Moseph "Moe Mastro Giovanni" (voiced by Chuck McCann), the ancient and benevolent cyborg creator and leader of the MOs. Moe explains BMO's backstory, revealing that BMO was created to take care of and have fun with Moe's son; however, Moe never had children and so he released BMO into the wild to find another family. Moe updates BMO drivers, and introduces it to his "family" of MOs.

== Production ==
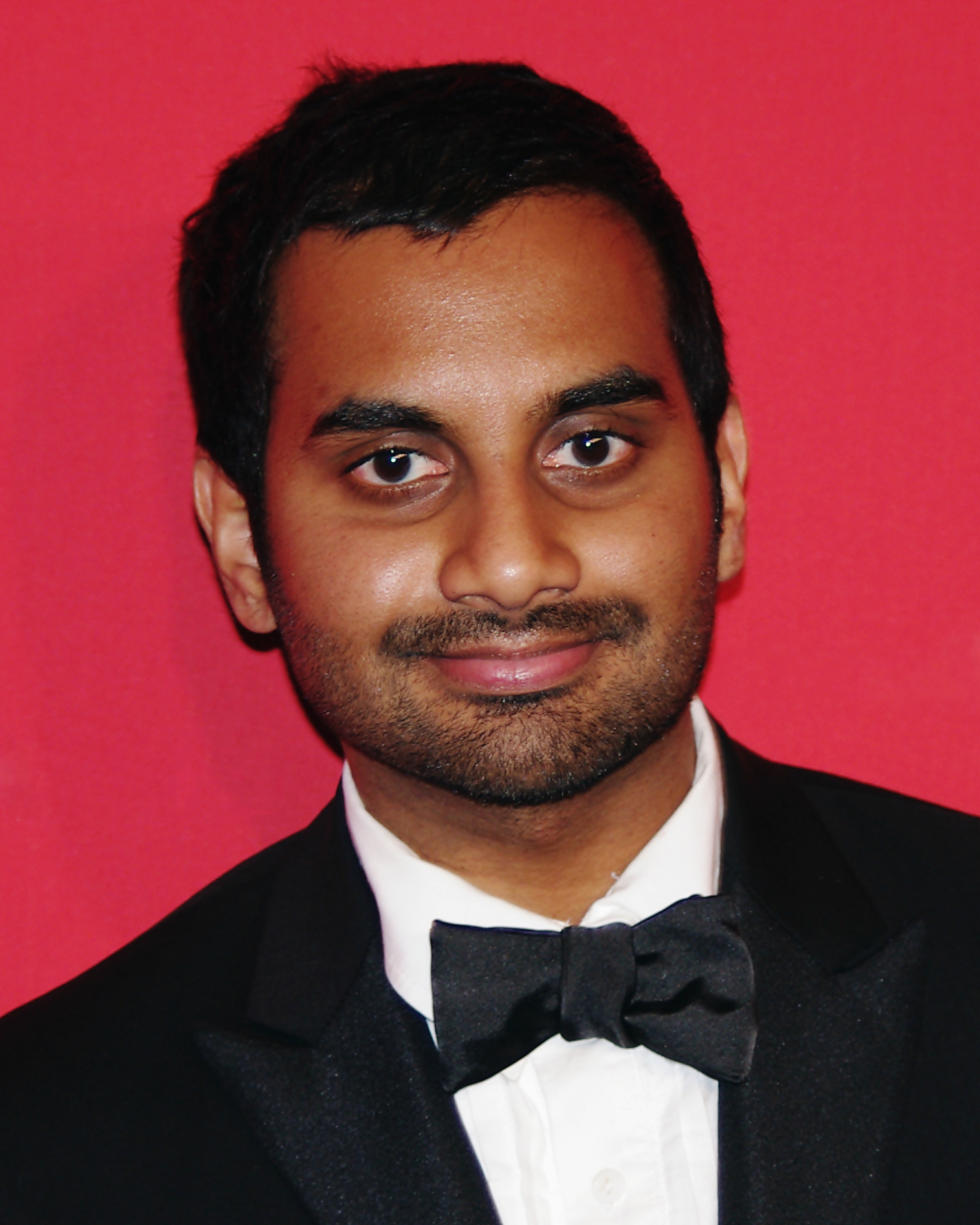
Aziz Ansari guest starred in the episode, voicing DMO

"Be More" was written and storyboarded by Tom Herpich and Steve Wolfhard, from a story by Kent Osborne, Pendleton Ward, Patrick McHale, Rebecca Sugar, Herpich, and Wolfhard. Art direction was handled by Nick Jennings, whereas supervising direction was helmed by Nate Cash. The episode was originally intended to have been produced during the series' third season, thus the reason that Sugar—a former storyboard artist on the show who had left after working on the earlier episode "Simon & Marcy"—was credited for having co-written the episode's story. However, the entry was pushed back until it was finalized during the latter part of the fifth season; according to both supervising producer Adam Muto and Rebecca Sugar, by the time the episode was being developed during the fifth season, it had substantially changed.

The character of Moe was designed by Wolfhard, and was based on actor Jamie Farr. The original ending featured Moe telling Finn, Jake, and BMO to leave because he has to use the bathroom; Wolfhard noted that this was "wisely vetoed" by Herpich and Muto. Comedian Aziz Ansari plays the part of DMO. In 2011, Ansari had previously been invited by Ward via Twitter to voice a character on the show. Chuck McCann voices Moe. According to storyline writer Jack Pendarvis, series creator Pendleton Ward asked him to be in the show after seeing one of his performances. The episode also guest stars Paul F. Tompkins as the security guard SMOs. Tompkins had previously voiced an unrelated character in the fourth season episode "Ignition Point".

== Reception ==
"Be More" aired on July 22, 2013, on Cartoon Network. It was watched by 2.67 million viewers, and received a 0.7 rating in the 18–49 demographic Nielsen household rating. Nielsen ratings are audience measurement systems that determine the audience size and composition of television programming in the United States, which means that the episode was seen by 0.7 percent of all 18- to 49-year-olds at the time of the broadcast. The installment was the 31st most-watched cable program in the 18–49 demographic on the night it aired. The episode first saw commercial release as part of the 2014 The Suitor DVD, which included 16 episodes from the series.

Oliver Sava of The A.V. Club awarded the episode a "B+". He applauded it for its exploration of BMO, its opening of new narrative opportunities with the introduction of Moe. Furthermore, he complimented both Ansari's and Tompkin's voice acting, noting that the "actors hired by this show have speaking voices that are immediately distinct, and that natural personality helps flesh out bit roles and make them memorable." Furthermore, Sava wrote that the entry's climax, featuring Moe explaining that BMO was built to understand fun was "an interesting insight into the philosophy behind this series" because the "childlike mentality of fun and play is an enlightened state in Adventure Time, and BMO reaches that every day with Finn and Jake."

The episode was later nominated for a Primetime Emmy Award for Short-format Animation at the 66th Primetime Emmy Awards, but lost to the Mickey Mouse episode "O Sole Minnie".
