= Sky Witch =

- Adventure Time episode
- Episode no.: Season 5 Episode 29
- Directed by: Nate Cash (Note: Supervising director); Nick Jennings (Note: Art director)
- Written by: Ako Castuera; Jesse Moynihan
- Story by: Kent Osborne; Pendleton Ward; Jack Pendarvis; Adam Muto; Jesse Moynihan
- Production code: 1014-138
- Original air date: July 29, 2013
- Running time: 11 minutes

Guest appearance
- Jill Talley as Maja

Episode chronology
← Previous "Be More"	Next → "Frost & Fire"
- Adventure Time season 5

"Sky Witch" is the twenty-ninth episode of the fifth season of the American animated television series Adventure Time. The episode was written and storyboarded by Ako Castuera and Jesse Moynihan, from a story by Kent Osborne, Pendleton Ward, Jack Pendarvis, Adam Muto, and Moynihan. It originally aired on Cartoon Network on July 29, 2013. The episode guest stars Jill Talley as the eponymous Sky Witch.

The series follows the adventures of Finn (voiced by Jeremy Shada), a human boy, and his best friend and adoptive brother Jake (voiced by John DiMaggio), a dog with magical powers to change shape and grow and shrink at will. In this episode, Marceline enlists Princess Bubblegum's help in order to track Maja the Sky Witch (voiced by Talley); it is revealed that Marceline's ex-boyfriend Ash sold Marceline's beloved stuffed animal Hambo to Maja. Only when Bubblegum trades her prized rock shirt—which was given to her by Marceline—is Hambo able to be reunited with Marceline.

The 1973 film Don't Look Now as well as the American clothing chain American Apparel inspired parts of the episode. Chris Houghton, a cartoonist for the official Adventure Time comic book, was hired to do freelance work for the episode. "Sky Witch" was met with critical acclaim, with reviewers commenting on the series' approach and presentation of Marceline and Bubblegum's relationship. In addition, the episode was watched by 2.075 million viewers. The events in this episode were continued in the sixth season episode "Something Big".

== Plot ==
Marceline arrives at the Candy Kingdom and beseeches Bubblegum to help her track down Maja, the Sky Witch (voiced by Jill Talley), arguing that it will allow the two to spend "quality time" with one another. Bubblegum eventually agrees, and the two journey to Maja's trap-infested lair. Bubblegum soon learns that Marceline is hoping to retrieve her beloved teddy bear, Hambo, that her ex-boyfriend Ash had previously traded for a magic wand. Bubblegum is annoyed that Marceline is worrying about a mere teddy bear, but Marceline, thinking that she sees Hambo, takes off, deeper into the lair.

Bubblegum gives chase, eventually discovering the inner sanctum of Maja's lair, where she confronts Maja herself. With Marceline disposed, fighting Maja's crow-rabbit familiar, Bubblegum realizes that since Maja purchased Hambo legally however dubious the transaction was, she has to respect the sale. She therefore trades Maja her beloved rock shirt for Hambo. Maja is later seen ominously musing that, because the shirt has more "psychic resonance", she will be able to use it for "something big".

== Production ==
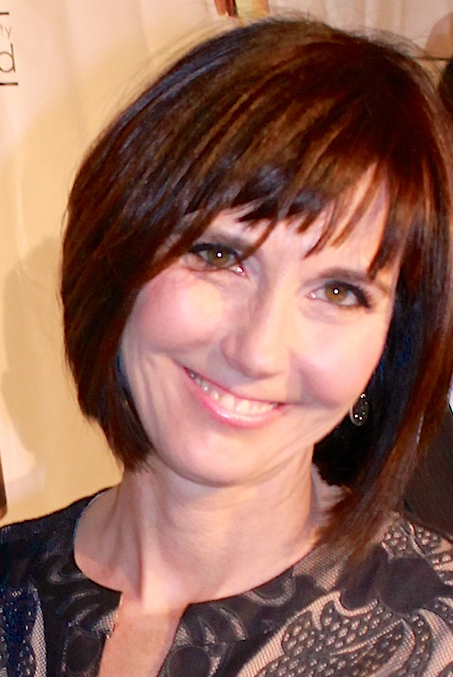
Jill Talley voices Maja.

"Sky Witch" was written and storyboarded by Ako Castuere and Jesse Moynihan, from a story by Kent Osborne, Pendleton Ward, Jack Pendarvis, Moynihan, and Adam Muto. Art direction was handled by Nick Jennings, whereas supervising direction was helmed by Nate Cash. On the behest of Pendarvis, Moynihan and Castuera inserted a reference to the 1973 film Don't Look Now, although Pendarivs later noted that because the two storyboard artists "worked a magical transformation", it was "not really an allusion anymore". The design for Marceline's outfit was based on an American Apparel model that Moynihan and Castuer had both seen. In turn, they decided to "make fun of" it and exaggerate it for use in the show.

Actress Jill Talley voiced Maja; she is also the wife of fellow series voice actor Tom Kenny. Chris Houghton, a cartoonist noted for drawing the covers for the first twelve issues of the official Adventure Time comic book, was hired to do freelance work for the episode. He was largely tasked with drawing finalized versions of Maja—heavily based upon Moynihan and Castuera's designs—as well as certain key frames for the episode. Santino Lascano, one of the background artists for the show, later wrote online that it was "fun" to design for this episode because it enabled him to draw new locations that the show had yet to explore. He noted that Maja's totems featured in the episode were designed to resembled the real-life sculptures made by Castuera.

== Reception ==
"Sky Witch" first aired on Cartoon Network on July 29, 2013. The episode was viewed by 2.075 million viewers and scored a 1.3 Nielsen rating. Nielsen ratings are audience measurement systems that determine the audience size and composition of television programming in the United States, which means that the episode was seen by 1.3 percent of all households that were watching television at the time of the episode's airing. Furthermore, the episode was the most-watched episode of television for Cartoon Network during the week of July 29 to August 4.

Sonia Saraiya of The A.V. Club awarded the episode an "A" and called it "awesome in every way" due to it showcasing Marceline and Princess Bubblegum's developing friendship. Saraiya applauded the fact that the show pushed two characters who are "both terrible at demonstrating their own vulnerability" together, allowing both of the character's faults to play off of one another.

Some critics argued that the episode seemed to officially recognize a relationship between Marceline and Bubblegum, unofficially referred to as "Bubbline", a portmanteau of "Bubblegum" and "Marceline". Dana Piccoli of AfterEllen.com wrote that the episode "appears to shift Bubbeline from subtext to canon". Ali Osworth of Autostraddle argued that the episode was evidence that the show was moving towards officially recognizing, or "canonizing", the relationship. On his website, Moynihan, however, argued that the meaning of the episode is up in the air and is contingent on how the audience interprets it. He noted: "I think it's important for me express that I rarely believe a writer has more authority over the meaning of their writing than the audience. When you submit a narrative to the public [the] writer no longer has the last word and sometimes their word is worse anyway."
