= Rattleballs =

- Adventure Time episode
- Episode no.: Season 5 Episode 46
- Directed by: Elizabeth Ito (Note: Supervising director); Nick Jennings (Note: Art director)
- Written by: Andy Ristaino; Cole Sanchez
- Story by: Kent Osborne; Pendleton Ward; Jack Pendarvis; Adam Muto
- Original air date: January 27, 2014
- Running time: 11 minutes

Guest appearance
- Rainn Wilson as Rattleballs

Episode chronology
← Previous "Blade of Grass"	Next → "The Red Throne"
- Adventure Time season 5

"Rattleballs" is the forty-sixth episode of the fifth season of the American animated television series Adventure Time. The episode was written and storyboarded by Andy Ristaino and Cole Sanchez, from a story by Kent Osborne, Pendleton Ward, Jack Pendarvis, Adam Muto, and Moynihan. It originally aired on Cartoon Network on January 27, 2014. The episode guest stars Rainn Wilson as the eponymous character.

The series follows the adventures of Finn (voiced by Jeremy Shada), a human boy, and his best friend and adoptive brother Jake (voiced by John DiMaggio), a dog with magical powers to change shape and grow and shrink at will. In this episode, Finn meets an old sword-fighting robot named Rattleballs (voiced by Rainn Wilson), and learns that Rattleballs was part of an elite force made by Princess Bubblegum long ago to protect the Candy Kingdom; however, the group became too destructive and so they were all destroyed, save for Rattleballs. After a short skirmish, Rattleballs proves that he is not a threat, so Bubblegum relents and does not destroy him.

During the recording of "Rattleballs", Wilson brought his son to the session; DiMaggio noted it was odd because both he and Shada were excited to meet the actor due to his role in the American sitcom The Office, whereas Wilson and his son were in turn excited to meet them, because they were both fans of the show. The episode was viewed by 2.213 million viewers, and Oliver Sava of The A.V. Club applauded the episode for providing Rattleballs with a solid debut.

== Plot ==
After his breakup with Flame Princess, Finn vows to do whatever Princess Bubblegum wishes. Soon, however, he becomes a burden, and Bubblegum orders Finn to take some time off and rest. Finn wanders to the junkyard, where he is saved from a collapse of garbage by a mysterious swordsman. They soon duel, but Finn is quickly defeated. However, after Finn shows remarkable bravery in defeat, the mysterious swordsman spares him, but heavily criticizes his dueling skills.

The mysterious being is introduced as Rattleballs (voiced by Rainn Wilson), a hybrid gumball and robot warrior. He eventually agrees to take Finn on as his sword appreciative, and tells him about his past; he was originally a member of an elite police force created by Princess Bubblegum to patrol the Candy Kingdom, but once crime was largely eliminated, the robots became extremely violent and took to illegal street fighting. Bubblegum disbanded the entire contingent, although Rattleballs escaped and has been living in the junkyard ever since.

Finn, torn between loyalty to the princess and his newfound sword master, eventually tells Bubblegum due to his chivalric code of honor. Bubblegum orders her banana guards to arrest Rattleballs, although he easily—though non lethally—defeats the entire police force. Bubblegum, realizing that Rattleballs may not be a threat, pretends to decommission the robot, but allows him to patrol the city at night, fighting crime.

== Production ==
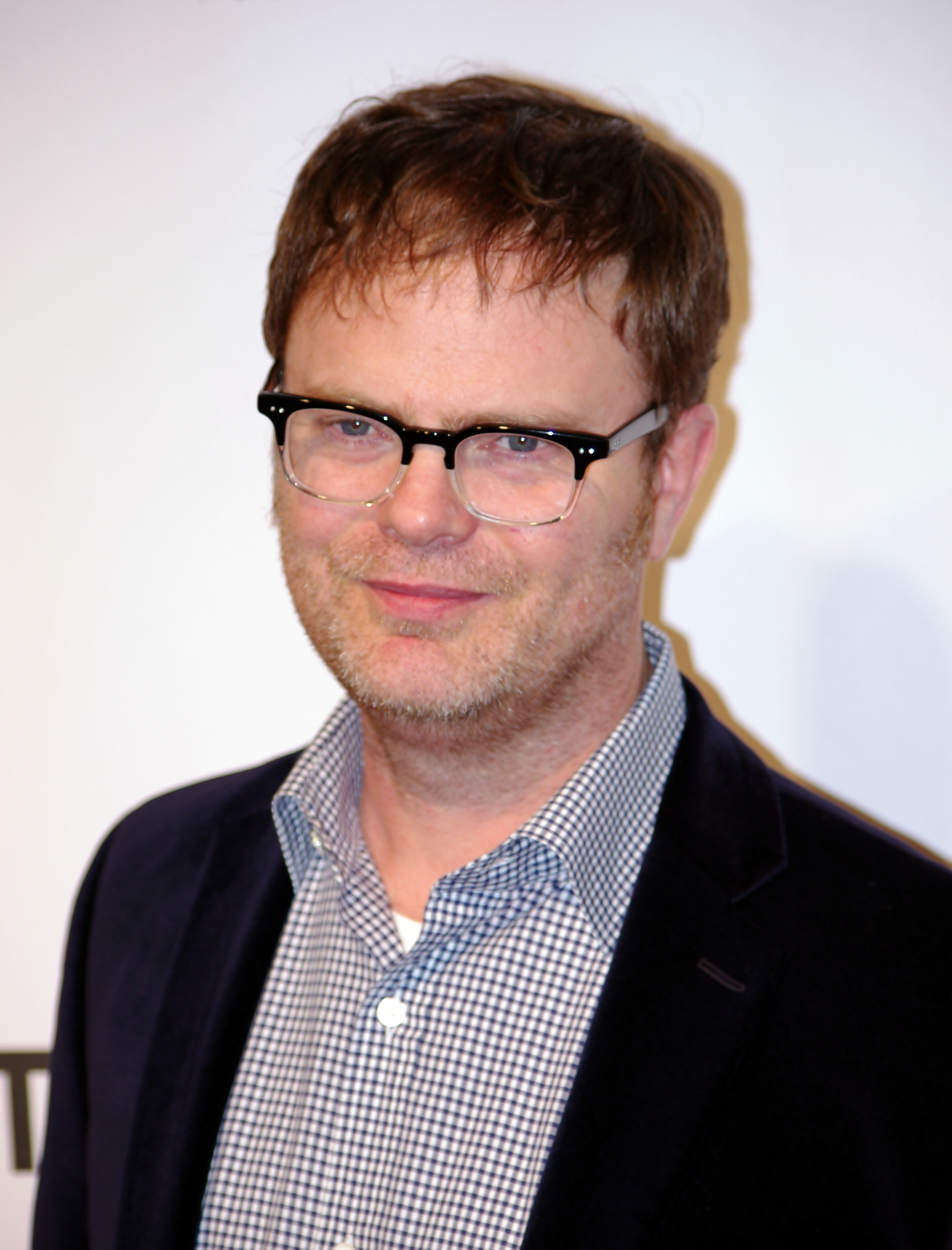
The episode guest starred Rainn Wilson as the titular Rattleballs.

"Rattleballs" was written and storyboarded by Andy Ristaino and Cole Sanchez, from a story by Kent Osborne, Pendleton Ward, Jack Pendarvis, and Adam Muto. Art direction was handled by Nick Jennings, whereas supervising direction was helmed by Elizabeth Ito. Ward and Ristaino worked on developing the look for Rattleballs. Initially, Ristaino wanted Finn to have a sword that would "talk back to him and insult his swordsmanship", although this idea was later scrapped because of the introduction of the grass sword in the previous episode.

Lead character designer Matt Forsythe helped develop the look for the "medieval banana guards"—who had originally appeared in the early episode "The Vault"—a task he later called "fun". Forsythe also modeled one of the banana guards after a 14-year-old identified only as Chris, who had voiced a character in the episode "Root Beer Guy" by means of the Make-A-Wish Foundation.

The episode guest stars Rainn Wilson as the titular character. Wilson, a reported fan of the show, brought his son Walter to the recording session because he too was a fan. Both DiMaggio and Shada were excited to meet and work with Wilson, both being fans of the American television series The Office in which Wilson played the character Dwight Schrute; DiMaggio later noted that, "He was kind of geeking out on us, and [Jeremy and I] were kind of geeking out on him."

== Reception ==
"Rattleballs" aired on January 27, 2014 on Cartoon Network. The episode was watched by 2.213 million viewers, and received a 0.5 rating in the 18–49 demographic Nielsen household rating. Nielsen ratings are audience measurement systems that determine the audience size and composition of television programming in the United States, which means that the episode was seen by 0.5 percent of all 18- to 49-year-olds at the time of the broadcast. The episode was the 70th most-watched cable program in the 18–49 demographic on the night it aired.

Oliver Sava of The A.V. Club awarded the episode an "A−", calling it "a particularly exceptional debut" for the titular character. Sava felt that the episode was good because it featured "hilarious voice work from Rainn Wilson as Rattleballs, dynamic action sequences, […] a story that expands on Ooo mythology, […] but most importantly, it uses the new cast member to expand Finn and PB's characters." In the end, he noted that "Rattleballs" was an entry that had multiple levels of delivery.
