= Betty (Adventure Time) =

- Adventure Time episode
- Title card
- Episode no.: Season 5 Episode 48
- Directed by: Nate Cash (Note: Supervising director); Adam Muto; Nick Jennings (Note: Art director)
- Written by: Ako Castuera; Jesse Moynihan
- Story by: Kent Osborne; Pendleton Ward; Jack Pendarvis; Adam Muto; Jesse Moynihan
- Original air date: February 24, 2014
- Running time: 11 minutes

Guest appearances
- Lena Dunham as Betty; Miguel Ferrer as Death; Steve Agee as Ash; Duncan Trussell as Ron James; Maurice LaMarche as Grand Master Wizard, Bella Noche

Episode chronology
← Previous "The Red Throne"	Next → "Bad Timing"
- Adventure Time season 5

"Betty" is the forty-eighth episode of the fifth season of the American animated television series Adventure Time. It was written and storyboarded by Ako Castuera and Jesse Moynihan, from a story by Kent Osborne, Pendleton Ward, Jack Pendarvis, Adam Muto, and Moynihan. It originally aired on Cartoon Network on February 24, 2014. The episode guest-stars Lena Dunham as the eponymous character, Betty. The entry also saw the return of Miguel Ferrer, Steve Agee, Duncan Trussell, and Maurice LaMarche as various characters.

The series follows the adventures of Finn (voiced by Jeremy Shada), a human boy, and his best friend and adoptive brother Jake (voiced by John DiMaggio), a dog with magical powers to change shape and grow and shrink at will. In this episode, the Ice King reverts to Simon (both voiced by Tom Kenny) after being exposed to an anti-magic being named Bella Noche, and gets help from Finn, Jake, and Marceline in order to get Betty, his former fiancée, back. Once he succeeds in bringing her back, however, he begins to die, forcing Betty herself to defeat Belle Noche.

An episode centered on Betty had been promised by the crew at San Diego Comic-Con in 2012. Due to the subject matter and length of the episode, several scenes had to be cut or trimmed for time, since so much was being placed in the episode. A review by Oliver Sava of The A.V. Club was complimentary towards the story, and Sava also applauded Dunham's voice-acting.

== Plot ==
=== Background ===
In the context of the series, the Ice King is a recurring antagonist of the series, and frequently kidnaps princesses throughout Ooo; although he is often at odds with Finn and Jake, he is generally not a serious threat. In the third season episode "Holly Jolly Secrets", it is revealed that the Ice King was originally a human antiquarian named Simon Petrikov who, after placing a mysterious ice crown on his head, became crazed with magic and scared off the love of his life, Betty, whom he never saw again. In the fourth season episode "I Remember You", it was revealed that the Ice King and 1000-year-old Marceline the Vampire Queen had originally met following the events of the mysterious Mushroom War, a cataclysmic war that destroyed modern human society, and "Simon & Marcy" revealed that the two shared a father-daughter bond.

=== Events ===
After Laser Wizard, Bufo, Forest Wizard, and—unwittingly—Ice King help a being named Bella Noche pass over into Wizard City, it reveals itself to be a creature of pure anti-magic. As such, the jewels from Ice King's crown are stripped of their magic, and Ice King reverts to his former self: Simon Petrikov (both voiced by Tom Kenny). Simon, initially unaware of where he is, steals a magic carpet from Ash (voiced by Steve Agee), flies to the Ice Kingdom, and enters a hidden sanctum wherein elements of his previous life—such as books, artifacts, and his clothing—have been preserved. He phones Marceline, telling her to rush over and bring her stuffed teddy bear Hambo.

Marceline arrives with Finn and Jake, and the trio learn that Simon is dying since he is over a thousand years old. As such, he wants to create a portal to the past and apologize to his fiancée Betty for making her leave him. Hambo, filled with sentimentality, is the key to the portal. Marceline, realizing that Hambo will be destroyed but that she will enable her former protector to see the love of his life for one last time, agrees. The portal is opened just moments after Simon had first put on the ice crown and scared Betty. Simon from the future appears to her, explains the situation, and apologizes. Betty, realizing what has happened jumps through the portal and kisses Simon, only for the portal to close and Simon to collapse.

Betty instantaneously realizes that Simon needs magic in order to survive, so she places him on the magic carpet and flies it to Wizard City. On the way, Death (voiced by Miguel Ferrer) appears to Simon in a vision, offering his one and only chance of escaping the curse of the crown. Simon refuses, and Betty attacks and eventually destroys Bella Noche. Simon reverts to Ice King, unaware of what happened. Later, he recounts the events to a captured Muscle Princess, while Betty—who survived the struggle with Bella Noche—watches sadly from a window and flies off on the magic carpet.

== Production ==
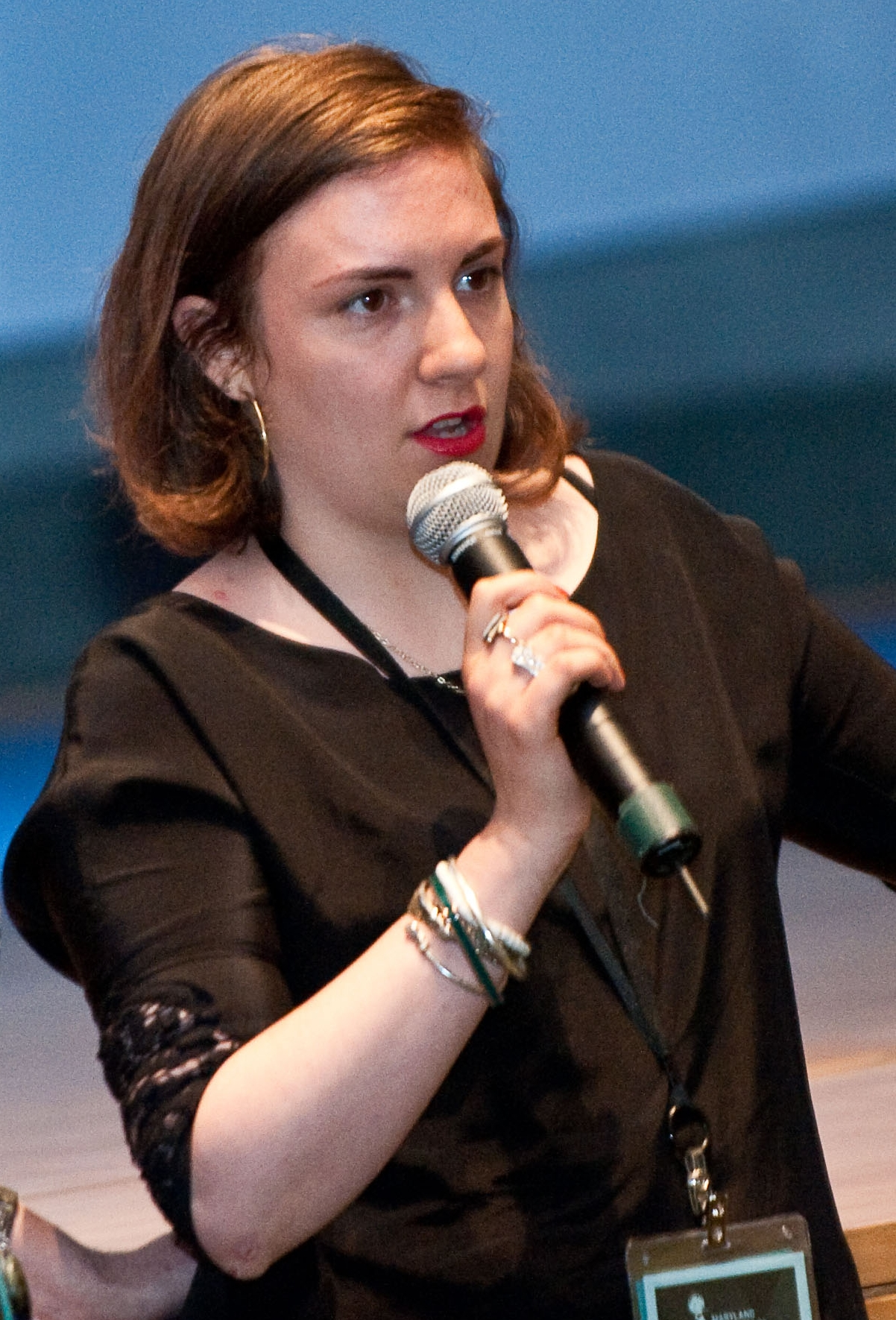
The episode guest stars Lena Dunham as Betty.

"Betty" was written and storyboarded by Ako Castuera and Jesse Moynihan, from a story by Kent Osborne, series creator Pendleton Ward, Jack Pendarvis, showrunner Adam Muto, and Moynihan. Art direction was handled by Nick Jennings, whereas supervising direction was handled by both Nate Cash and Muto. The plot and content of the episode was "highly anticipated" by the fans, according to Moynihan, as an episode centered on Betty had been promised by the crew at San Diego Comic-Con in 2012. Moynihan was inspired to create the original premise for the story after following up on the secret wizard society thread that had been referenced in "Reign of Gunters" and "Wizards Only, Fools". In time, Moynihan developed a story idea that worked in the society as well as Simon's return. This pitch was submitted as an outline to the show's writers, who in turn worked with Moynihan and rewrote it to produce the final episode. Moynihan had originally wanted "Betty" to be a double episode so as to fit in all of the relevant plot information in a timely manner. However, because the season already had another double episode in the works, Moynihan and Castuera were forced to "fit all [the story] into one bullet." Moynihan later noted that his personal intention for the episode was to "convey the idea that for Simon, death was preferable to life as Ice King, but that love and sacrifice to another person could provide hope for a future."

"Betty" stars comedian and Girls creator Lena Dunham as Betty. Dunham and Adventure Time head writer Kent Osborne were Facebook friends, and knew each other from the independent film scene. When the crew approached her, she was excited and interested because she had a goddaughter who was a fan. She recorded her lines while she was working on Girls in New York. (Starting with the ninth-season miniseries Elements, the role of Betty was taken over by Felicia Day.) The episode also marks the return of several guest stars, namely Miguel Ferrer (who reprises his role as Death), Steve Agee (who reprises his role as Ash), Duncan Trussell (who reprises his role as Ron James), and Maurice LaMarche (who reprises his role as the Grand Master Wizard. LaMarche also voices Belle Noche in this episode. Huntress Wizard, a character popular with the Adventure Time fanbase, was originally supposed to be featured in the episode. Because "Betty" was already "jam packed", everything "non-essential" had to be cut out of the storyboard, which left Moynihan "heartbroken". He later used the "deleted scene" as the inspiration for the episode's promotional artwork.

== Reception ==
"Betty" aired on February 24, 2014, on Cartoon Network. The episode was watched by 1.713 million viewers, and received a Nielsen household rating of 1.2. Nielsen ratings are audience measurement systems that determine the audience size and composition of television programming in the United States, which means that the episode was seen by 1.2 percent of all households at the time of the broadcast. The episode was the 4th most-watched episode aired by Cartoon Network for the week of February 24 to March 2, 2014.

Oliver Sava of The A.V. Club awarded it an "A" and called it a "huge episode for the Ice King", because it marked "a major shift in the character's future by reconnecting with his past lover", Betty. Sava noted that it was designed to "jump-start the momentum by introducing new characters and storylines for future episodes", and that its premise opens up various storytelling avenues for the future of the series. He also applauded the casting of Dunham as Betty, noting that she "finds the emotional truth underneath the absurd situation to balance the drama and comedy of the script." Nexi Pandell of Wired magazine named the episode one of "Episodes You Can’t Skip".
