= The Red Throne =

- Adventure Time episode
- Episode no.: Season 5 Episode 47
- Directed by: Elizabeth Ito (Note: Supervising director); Nick Jennings (Note: Art director)
- Written by: Seo Kim; Somvilay Xayaphone
- Story by: Kent Osborne; Pendleton Ward; Jack Pendarvis; Adam Muto
- Production code: 1014-158
- Original air date: February 10, 2014

Guest appearances
- Roddy Piper as Don John; Keith David as Flame King

Episode chronology
← Previous "Rattleballs"	Next → "Betty"
- Adventure Time season 5

"The Red Throne" is the forty-seventh episode of the fifth season of the American animated television series Adventure Time. The episode was storyboarded by Seo Kim and Somvilay Xayaphone, from a story by Kent Osborne, Pendleton Ward, Jack Pendarvis, and Adam Muto. It originally aired on Cartoon Network on February 10, 2014.

The series follows the adventures of Finn (voiced by Jeremy Shada), a human boy, and his best friend and adoptive brother Jake (voiced by John DiMaggio), a dog with magical powers to change shape and grow and shrink at will. In this episode, Flame Princess (voiced by Jessica DiCicco), with the help of Cinnamon Bun (Dee Bradley Baker) and Finn, tries to escape from an arranged marriage between her and Don John the Flame Lord (Roddy Piper), as set up by her father the Flame King (Keith David). Seo Kim and Somvilay Xayaphone wrote the episode from a synopsis devised by several other writers, including show creator Pendleton Ward.

Piper and David, stars of They Live (1988), a John Carpenter film, lent their voices to two of the aforementioned characters. As an homage, the episode contains a parody from a popular combat sequence in the film, in which the actors box for close to six minutes. Meanwhile, background art was created by Derek Ballard, whose experience growing up in Utah inspired one of his pieces for the episode. Upon its airing "The Red Throne" was seen by 2.11 million viewers. Writers of entertainment- and education-related websites praised the episode for its writing and themes, as well as the performances by Piper and David. Despite this praise, the Adventure Time crew perceived its online response from fans to be largely negative.

== Plot ==
In the Fire Kingdom, Don John the Flame Lord shows up to tell Flame Princess she is not brutish enough to rule over the Flame subjects. Her father, the Flame King, appears as his daughter is deprived of her body temperature and crown. He tells Flame Princess he has arranged her marriage with Don John. When she tries to escape their palace, its inhabitants – put under a mind-control spell by Don John – try to seize her. Cinnamon Bun, riding his wolf, punctures the palace walls. He rescues Flame Princess, and the two escape. They enlist the aid of Finn, the ex of Flame Princess.

Still uneasy over their split, Finn tries to show off to Flame Princess, though she informs him that they should only remain friends. They return to the kingdom, its entrance now guarded by the inhabitants. Finn goes directly for the guards, but he and Flame Princess are quickly captured after she reveals to him that the people are being controlled through Don John's spell. Don John visits the imprisoned duo, where Flame Princess vows never to marry him. Don John complains to the Flame King that he is failing to deliver on his promise. The lord and king box, with the latter authority knocking out Don John, which frees the Flame people from his spell. Cinnamon Bun delivers a speech to the palace convincing the people to detain the Flame King and Don John while earning the affections of Flame Princess.

== Production ==
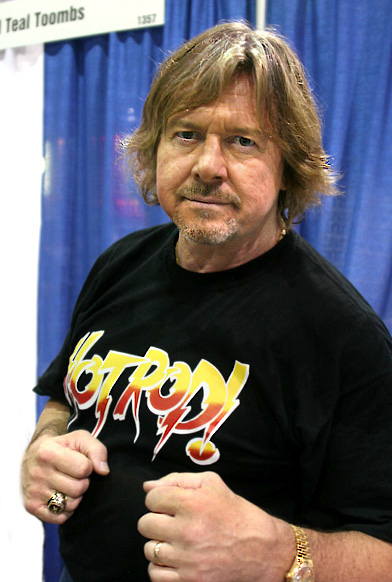
Roddy Piper (pictured) voiced the character Don John.

"The Red Throne" was written by Seo Kim and Somvilay Xayaphone. A separate group of writers – Kent Osborne, Pendleton Ward, Jack Pendarvis, and Adam Muto – came up with the idea for the episode, which Kim and Xayaphone then adapted into a storyboard. Employing other crew members, background artist Derek Ballard depicted a derelict van, a wrecked truck, and ruined musical instruments in one piece for the episode. This was inspired by his growing up in the desert of Utah. Since he himself was in a band, he would often let other bands temporarily stay at his house during their tours, often taking them to auto shops due to their vans and campers breaking down.

The voice of Don John the Flame Lord was supplied by "Rowdy" Roddy Piper, in unison with Keith David, who provided the voice of the Flame King. A distinguished wrestler and actor, Piper had appeared in numerous films. One of his most famous roles is that of the unnamed man (dubbed Nada) in They Live, directed by John Carpenter and released in 1988. A well-known scene in the film – lasting for nearly six minutes – features the man fighting with his friend (played by David), whom Nada wants to share his glasses with. This episode of Adventure Time includes a parody of this iconic scene, featuring Don John and the Flame King engaging in combat. The scene in They Live was previously the subject of spoofs in South Park and Saints Row IV, though the parody featured in Adventure Time was called exemplar for reuniting both Piper and David. WWE applauded one of Don John's lines (i.e. "My gym is magic, and my protein shake is rage!"), musing that it had likely been written with Piper's wrestling persona in mind.

== Release and reception ==
Cartoon Network originally aired "The Red Throne" on February 10, 2014. 2.11 million people saw the episode live on broadcast; according to TV by the Numbers, 0.4 percent of all 18- to 49-year-old residents of households with television sets watched the episode, as indicated by its Nielsen rating. The network released the episode on DVD, first in the year of that broadcast, as part of the Finn the Human box set, and later in 2015, as part of a box set for the complete fifth season.

The Adventure Time crew was satisfied with the episode on its completion. In spite of that, Muto described the reaction from fans on the Internet as largely negative, much to their surprise. It earned an A− grade from Oliver Sava of The A.V. Club, who compared Cinnamon Bun's evolution from a simple-minded character to one of complexity with the progression of the show itself. Sava opined that the theme of life following a broken romance benefits from this complexity. Sava saw the physical cooling of Flame Princess as a crafty metaphor for the personal changes an individual from a former relationship might experience, as well as the nostalgia felt over such a relationship. Separate from romance, Sava interpreted the battle between the Flame Lord and the Flame King as to demonstrate Flame Princess is a more sensible ruler.

The Huffington Post writer Cat Blake cited Cinnamon Bun gaining the affection of Flame Princess as a reason for secondary schoolers not to underestimate people. Staff writers of TV.com called this character progression for "seemingly one-note characters" a strength of the show, as similarly applied to the Ice King. Writing in DVD Talk, Adam Tyner described the episode as showing Finn at his most embarrassing. In memoriam of Piper, who died in July 2015, Brandon Stroud of Uproxx called Don Jon one of his best roles in pop culture. In the Official Tribute Commemorative Magazine for Piper, editor Jeff Ashworth and staff supposed that fans of the series were likely foreign to the "grizzly tones" of Piper's voice. The commemoration saw his guest role as showing his mastery of pop culture while calling Don Jon's bizarre fate normal in the show's universe.
