= James Baxter the Horse =

- Adventure Time episode
- James Baxter entertains a group of people. Every instance of the horse was guest-animated by British artist James Baxter.
- Episode no.: Season 5 Episode 19
- Directed by: Adam Muto (Note: Supervising director); Nick Jennings (Note: Art director)
- Written by: Pendleton Ward; Somvilay Xayaphone
- Story by: Patrick McHale; Kent Osborne; Pendleton Ward
- Production code: 1014-124
- Original air date: May 6, 2013
- Running time: 11 minutes

Guest appearance
- James Baxter as James Baxter

Episode chronology
| ← Previous "Princess Potluck" | Next → "Shh!" |
- Adventure Time season 5

"James Baxter the Horse" is the nineteenth episode of the fifth season of the American animated television series Adventure Time. The episode was written and storyboarded by series creator Pendleton Ward and Somvilay Xayaphone, from a story by Patrick McHale, Kent Osborne, and Ward. It originally aired on Cartoon Network on May 6, 2013. The episode guest stars animator James Baxter as the titular horse.

In this episode, Finn and Jake stumble across a horse named James Baxter (voiced by Baxter the animator) who has the ability to make sad people feel better. While seeking to emulate James Baxter's style, Finn and Jake accidentally anger the spirit of a deceased being at a funeral and are nearly killed by it; however, James Baxter arrives at the last moment and cheers the spirit up.

The impetus for the episode stemmed from a guest lecture Baxter gave at California Institute of the Arts (CalArts) when Ward was a student; during the discussion, someone requested that he animate a horse on a beach ball, a concept which fixed itself into Ward's mind. The episode was viewed by 2.21 million viewers and received a 1.4 household rating. Oliver Sava of The A.V. Club wrote positively of the episode, arguing that it was a metacommentary on the nature of Adventure Time itself. Likewise, Ryan Thomason of WatchPlayRead enjoyed the episode, both for its full embracing of silliness, and also for its darker ending.

== Plot ==
The destruction of an egg causes BMO (voiced by Niki Yang) to start crying. Finn and Jake try to cheer them up, but only make matters worse. Only when James Baxter (voiced by James Baxter), a horse who neighs his name frequently while balancing on a beach ball, arrives on the scene does BMO feel any better. Inspired by the actions of James Baxter, Finn and Jake decide that they want to try to make people feel better. As such, they journey across the magical land of Ooo (wherein Finn and Jake live) and emulate Baxter's brand of humor by saying their names humorously just like James Baxter. However, after interrupting a funeral and accidentally frightening a young Candy Kingdom citizen, they realize that they are merely making people feel worse.

Finn, Jake, and BMO travel to the So-Und Institute of Sound (a research facility that studies the nature of sound), where they attempt to discover the ultimate "feel-good" sound. After much experimentation, Jake eventually decides to morph into and emulate the sound of a trumpet, while Finn feigns playing him. Their plan is a success, and they cheer up a multitude of people across Ooo. However, when they return to the aforementioned funeral, they accidentally anger the ghost of the deceased individual. This spirit overpowers Finn and Jake and attempts to kill them, but before the two meet their demise, James Baxter arrives and calms the ghost by making it laugh. With his job completed, Baxter gallops off into the sunset.

== Production ==
"James Baxter the Horse" was written and storyboarded by series creator Pendleton Ward and Somvilay Xayaphone, from a story developed by Ward, Patrick McHale, and Kent Osborne. When scripting an episode outline that he knows will be storyboarded by Xayaphone, Ward often inserts story notes urging Xayaphone to explore his interest in noise music. In the commentary for the fourth season episode "Dream of Love", Ward noted that the story outline for "James Baxter the Horse" had caused Xayaphone much excitement, because he finally had free rein "to explore noise-making".

The titular character was named in honor of the animator, James Baxter, who had once delivered a guest lecture at CalArts when Ward was a student. In the lecture, Baxter was showing students how to animate certain situations, and someone suggested that Baxter try animating a horse balancing on a beach ball. Baxter declined the suggestion, instead opting to animate something "simpler". However, according to Adam Muto, the image of a horse and a beach ball fixed itself in Ward's mind. Later, when Adventure Time was in production, Baxter called Ward to let him know that if the series needed any special animation work done, he would enjoy working on the show. Ward then met with Baxter and pitched him the initial idea behind "James Baxter the Horse"; Baxter himself thought the idea was "great", and was flattered that Ward wanted to name the eponymous character after him.

Baxter himself animated all instances of the horse and beach ball. While the show's animation is usually handled overseas in South Korea by either Rough Draft Korea or by Saerom Animation, Baxter animated his scenes from his home studio. Because of this hurdle, Baxter was forced to animate in the center of the paper so that during the compositing phase, his animation could be moved around if necessary. Baxter's wife, Kendra, did all the clean-up work for his animation, and inking & painting of the animation was done in South Korea.

== Reception ==
"James Baxter the Horse" first aired on Cartoon Network on May 6, 2013. The episode was viewed by 2.21 million viewers, making it the top-rated Cartoon Network series during the week of May 6–12. The episode scored a 1.4 Nielsen household rating. Nielsen ratings are audience measurement systems that determine the audience size and composition of television programming in the United States, which means that the episode was seen by 1.4 percent of all households watching television at the time of the airing. The episode first saw commercial release as part of the 2014 The Suitor DVD, which included 16 episodes from the series. It was later re-released as part of the complete fifth season DVD in July 2015.

Oliver Sava of The A.V. Club awarded the episode an "A−" and succinctly described it as "an episode all about finding the right combinations of sounds and actions to make a person happy, and it's hard not to see it as a metacommentary on the creation of Adventure Time." Sava praised the "audio/visual combo" that represented James Baxter and felt that he was consistently funny throughout the episode. Later, in a review of the season five episode "Shh!", Sava wrote that "James Baxter the Horse" was an episode that "looked at this show’s musical philosophy". Ryan Thomason of WatchPlayRead wrote that "a horse on a beach ball neighing it's [sic] name to the delight of everyone that is sad ever is a pretty high concept [for] silliness", but that the episode took a dark turn with the introduction of "the creepy skittering skeleton [of the deceased individual] that pops out of the casket [and its] sad evil giant ghost [...] that nearly kills Finn and Jake."
