= Adventure Time season 5 =

Adventure Time
- Season 5
- Blu-ray cover
- Showrunners: Pendleton Ward (first half); Adam Muto (second half)
- Starring: Jeremy Shada; John DiMaggio; Madeleine Martin; Roz Ryan
- No. of episodes: 52

Release
- Original network: Cartoon Network
- Original release: November 12, 2012 – March 17, 2014

Season chronology
- ← Previous; Season 4 Next → Season 6

The fifth season of Adventure Time, an American animated television series created by Pendleton Ward, premiered on Cartoon Network on November 12, 2012 and concluded on March 17, 2014. The season follows the adventures of Finn, a human boy, and his best friend and adoptive brother Jake, a dog with magical powers to change shape and size at will. Finn and Jake live in the post-apocalyptic Land of Ooo, where they interact with the other main characters of the show: Princess Bubblegum, The Ice King, Marceline the Vampire Queen, Lumpy Space Princess, BMO, and Flame Princess.

This season comprises 52 episodes, making it twice the length of any of the show's previous seasons. The season also featured David OReilly and James Baxter as guest animators in the episodes "A Glitch is a Glitch" and "James Baxter the Horse," respectively. Furthermore, this was the last season of Adventure Time that Sugar and Page worked on, as they left before the season ended to create Steven Universe and Clarence, respectively. It was also Ward's last season as Adventure Time's showrunner.

The first episode of the fifth season was the two-parter episode "Finn the Human" / "Jake the Dog," both of which aired on November 12, 2012. 3.435 million viewers viewed the episode; this marked a dramatic increase from the previous season's premiere and finale. The season ended with "Billy's Bucket List," which was viewed by 2.335 million viewers.

The season was met with largely positive critical reception. In June 2013, the series was nominated for "Best Animated Series" at the 2013 Critics' Choice Television Awards, although it did not win. Both "Simon & Marcy" and "Be More" were nominated for Primetime Emmy Awards for Short-Format Animation at the 65th and 66th Primetime Emmy Awards respectively. Former character designer Andy Ristaino and series' art director Nick Jennings both won Emmys for "Outstanding Individual Achievement In Animation" in 2013 and 2014, respectively. In addition, several compilation DVDs that contained episodes from the season have been released. The complete season set was released on DVD and Blu-ray on July 14, 2015.

== Development ==
=== Concept ===
The season follows the adventures of Finn the Human, a human boy, and his best friend Jake, a dog with magical powers to change shape and grow and shrink at will. Finn and Jake live in the post-apocalyptic Land of Ooo, wherein they interact with the other major characters, including Princess Bubblegum, The Ice King, Marceline the Vampire Queen, Lumpy Space Princess, BMO, and Flame Princess. Common storylines revolve around Finn and Jake discovering strange creatures, dealing with the antagonistic but misunderstood Ice King, and battling monsters to help others. Multi-episode storylines for this season include Finn's relationship with and eventual breakup with Flame Princess, Lemongrab's descent into tyranny, and Finn and Jake's attempt to prevent the Lich from destroying all life in the multiverse.

=== Production ===
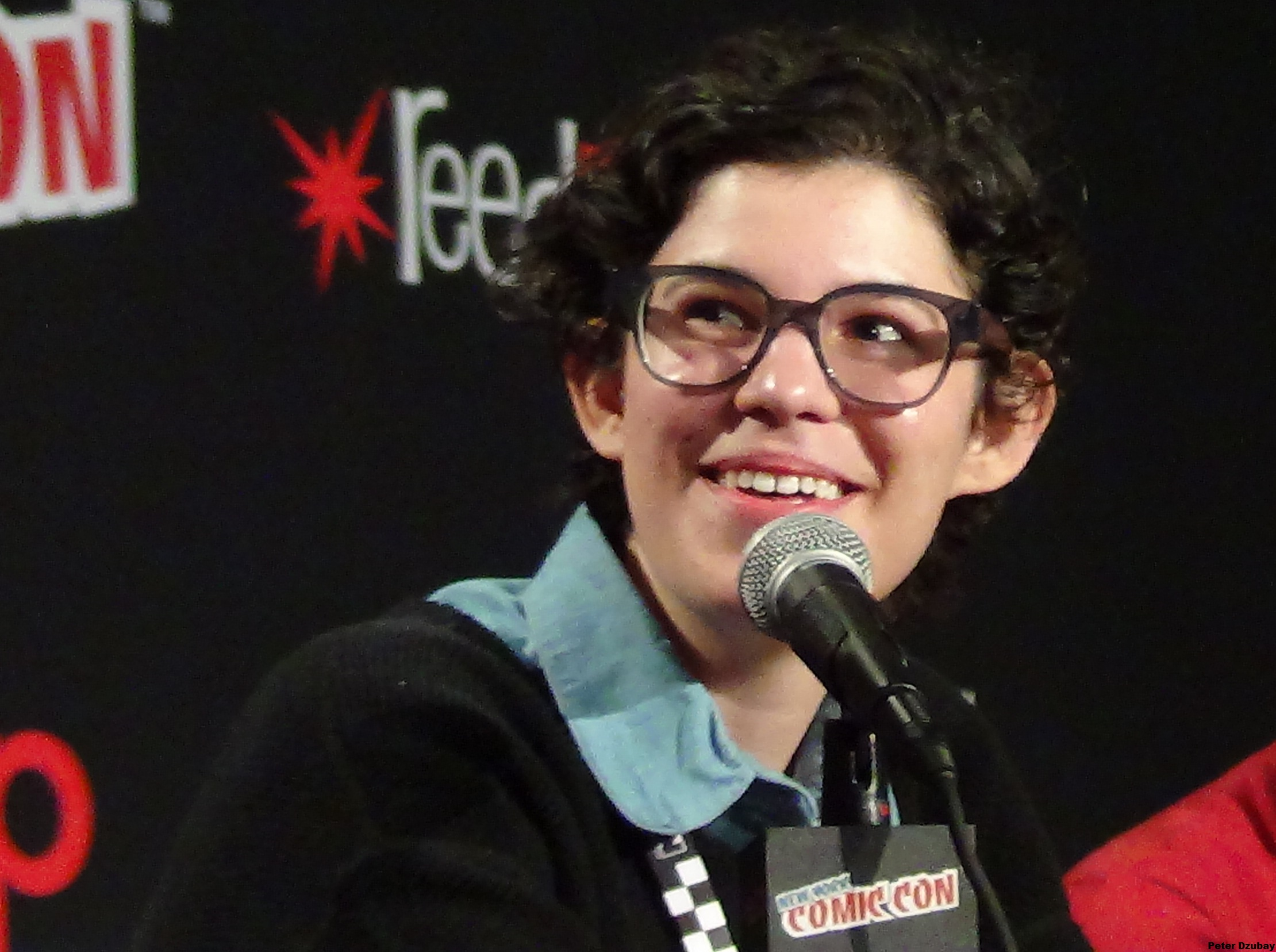
This season was the last to feature Rebecca Sugar as a writer and storyboard artist.

On October 12, 2012, it was announced that Cartoon Network had officially renewed Adventure Time for a fifth season. The episode titles were released on November 2, 2012 by Frederator Studios, while the show had just reached the end of its fourth season. Based on production numbers, "Finn the Human" was the first episode that underwent production, and it was also the first episode aired. The season contains 52 episodes, twice the normal number of episodes per season. Both Frederator and storyboard artist Jesse Moynihan explained that originally, a four-part special was supposed to divide the season in half, but that the special was pushed off, and later cancelled. However, some elements of the planned special were later used in the show's sixth season's episode "Something Big". In production, the first half of the season was referred to as season 5.1, and the second half was referred to as 5.2.

This season's episodes were produced in a process similar to those of the previous seasons. Each episode was outlined in two-to-three pages that contained the necessary plot information. These outlines were then handed to storyboard artists, who created full storyboards. (Note: Information regarding story development and storyboard artists is taken from the opening credits of the season's fifty-two episodes.) Design and coloring were done at Cartoon Network Studios in Burbank, California, and animation was handled overseas in South Korea by Rough Draft Korea and Saerom Animation. Although almost all of the episodes are hand-animated, the fifteenth episode, "A Glitch Is a Glitch", was created by guest animator David OReilly in his signature 3-D animation. According to Adam Muto, OReilly was brought on board after Ward expressed an interest in letting him helm an episode. Initially, the producers had wanted OReilly to appear in earlier seasons, but the network was hesitant to bring in guest directors. Eventually, the network relented, and he was finally approved to appear in the fifth season. British animator James Baxter guest animated the horse featured in the episode "James Baxter the Horse". For the first half of the season, the writers room was largely composed of Ward, Kent Osborne, and Pat McHale. McHale eventually left the series to create Over the Garden Wall, and Jack Pendarvis and the newly promoted Muto and were brought on board to pen story outlines.

"Little Dude" was the first entry in the series to have been storyboarded by prop and character designer DeForge. He wrote on his official Tumblr that, "Cole and Adam Muto basically held my hand through the whole process, and were both incredibly patient with me." Starting with "Love Games", Ristaino was promoted from lead character designer to storyboard artist. Guest artist Falk, creator of the animated series Untalkative Bunny, storyboarded the episodes "Shh!" and "Root Beer Guy". The former was dedicated to Armen Mirzaian who was a storyboard artist for earlier episodes in the series. Mirzaian died in a car accident on February 21, 2013 at the age of 35. Regular storyboarder Castuera had to take off two storyboard rotations due to an art show, and so her partner, Moynihan, worked with German cartoonist Wellmann on "The Suitor" and "Wizards Only, Fools"; the two co-operated on their storyboards via Skype and Google+ Hangout. Pearson was paired with Xayaphone for both the episodes "Candy Streets" and "Frost & Fire"; however, this pairing was only temporary, and Xayaphone boarded the rest of the season with Kim. This season was the last to feature Page and Sugar. Page left after completing "Davey" to create his own series Clarence. Sugar left the series after storyboarding the episode "Simon & Marcy" to focus her attention on her own Cartoon Network series, Steven Universe.

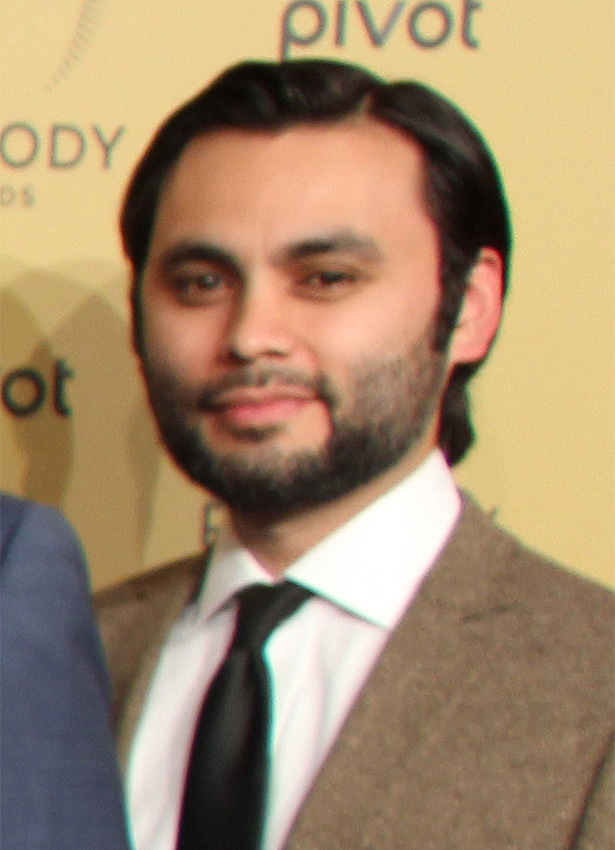
Midway through this season, Adam Muto became the showrunner.

The episode "All Your Fault" was the last regular episode of the season to feature a "directed by" credit. The subsequent episode, "Little Dude", only credited Muto as "supervising director" and Nick Jennings as "art director". Muto later explained that, "No one currently gets the 'directed by' credit." Both Muto and Nate Cash had, in previous episodes, been credited as creative directors, but according to Muto, the series decided to phase the title out in favor of "supervising director". For the first half of the season, both Muto and Cash took turns holding the supervising director credit on different episodes. Starting with "Shh!", however, Elizabeth Ito, a former storyboard artist for the show in season one, returned to the series and was also credited as supervising director in place of Muto. "Bad Little Boy", the season's eleventh episode, however, still had a "directed by" credit. This is due to the fact that the episode was produced before "Little Dude", but aired out of order. "A Glitch Is a Glitch" also featured a "directed by" credit, but this is due to the fact that the episode's director, OReilly, was a guest animator and director for the series.

In an interview with Rolling Stone, Ward revealed that he stepped down as series showrunner sometime during this season in favor of Muto. He explained that, as a naturally introverted person, he found it extremely exhausting having to deal with people every day. With that being said, Ward remained working on the series as a storyboard artist and storyline writer, and every single fifth-season episode (with the exception of "A Glitch is a Glitch") featured story input by Ward.

== Cast ==
The voice actors for the season include: Jeremy Shada (Finn the Human), John DiMaggio (Jake the Dog), Tom Kenny (The Ice King), Hynden Walch (Princess Bubblegum), and Olivia Olson (Marceline the Vampire Queen). Ward himself provides the voice for several minor characters, including Lumpy Space Princess. Former storyboard artist Niki Yang voices the sentient video game console BMO in English, as well as Jake's girlfriend Lady Rainicorn in Korean. Polly Lou Livingston, a friend of Pendleton Ward's mother, Bettie Ward, plays the voice of the small elephant Tree Trunks. Justin Roiland provides the voice of the Earl of Lemongrab. Jessica DiCicco voices Flame Princess, Finn's former romantic interest. The season's first few episodes also feature The Lich, the series principal antagonist. The Lich is portrayed by Ron Perlman. The Adventure Time cast records their lines together as opposed to doing it individually. This is to capture more natural sounding dialogue among the characters. Hynden Walch has described these group session as akin to "doing a play reading—a really, really out there play."

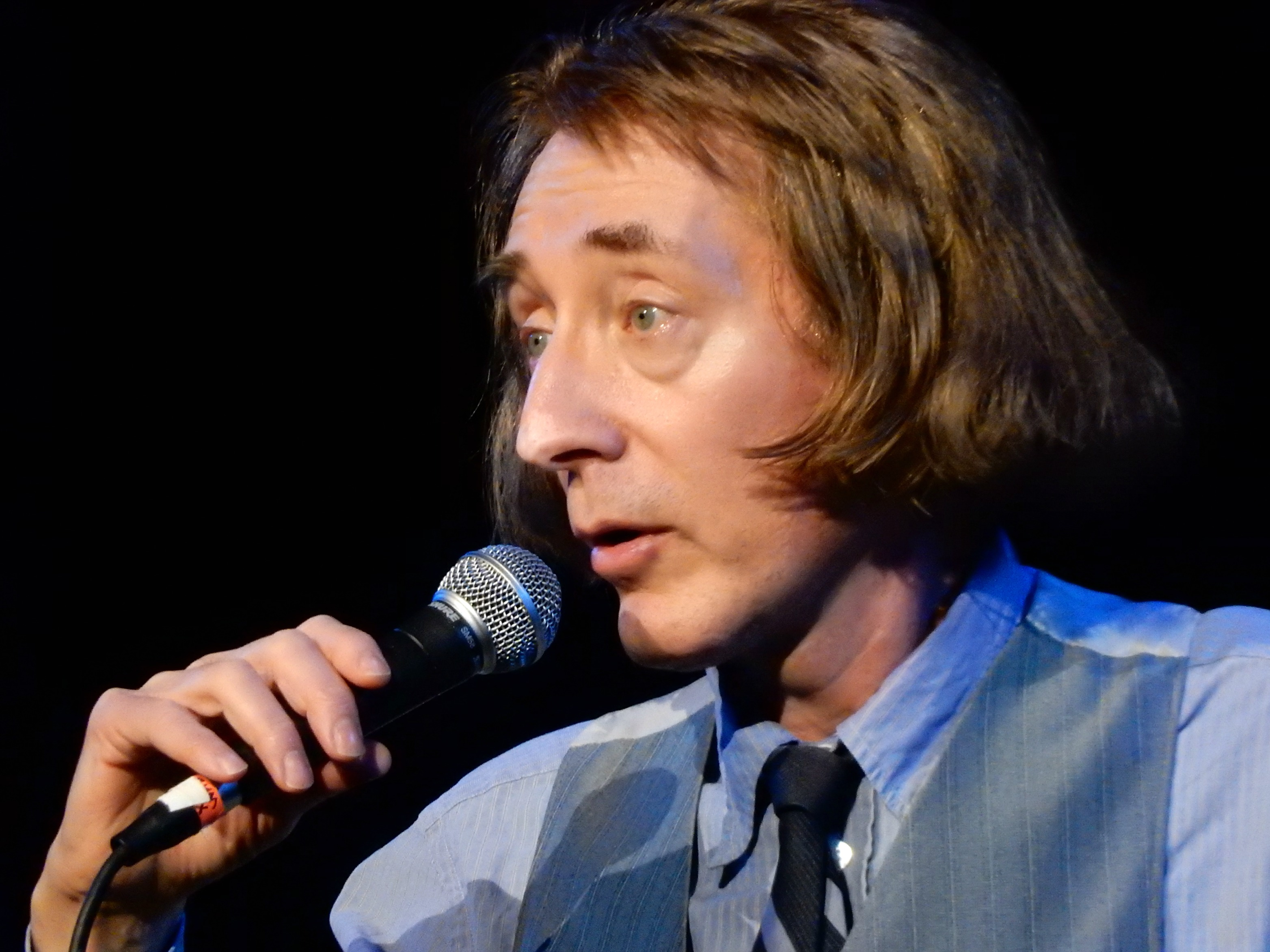
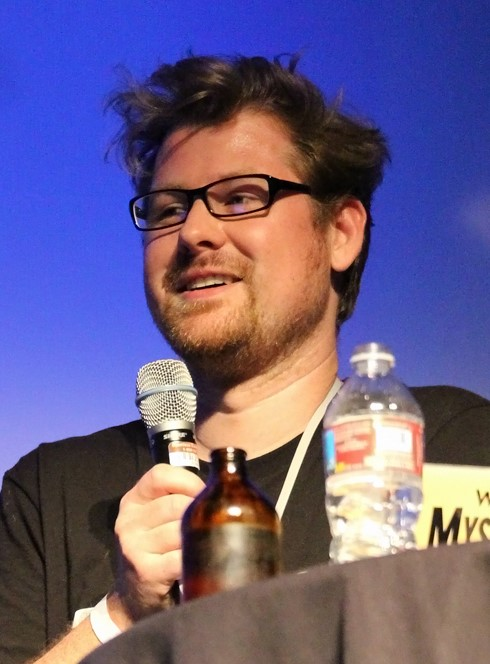
The season saw several actors and actresses return to the series and reprise past roles, such as Emo Philips (left) and Justin Roiland (right).

Several voices actors and actresses reprise their characters in this season. Emo Philips reprises his fourth season character Cuber in both "Five More Short Graybles" and "Another Five Short Graybles". Andy Milonakis reprises his role as N.E.P.T.R. in "Mystery Dungeon". "Bad Little Boy" features Neil Patrick Harris returning as Prince Gumball, Madeleine Martin reprising the role of Fionna Campbell, and Roz Ryan reappearing as Cake. Keith David once again voices the Flame King in "Vault of Bones", "Earth & Water", and "The Red Throne". Davey Johnson reappears as the goblin king Xergiok in "The Great Bird Man"; he also voices the titular character in the episode "Davey". "Davey" also features Randy Liedtke as a candy person named Randy. Steve Little, who plays the recurring role as Peppermint Butler, also reprises his role as Abracadaniel in "Wizards Only, Fools" and "Play Date". Maurice LaMarche reprises his role as Grand Master Wizard in both "Wizards Only, Fools" and "Betty". Musical parody artist "Weird Al" Yankovic reprises his role as Banana Man in "We Fixed a Truck". Noah Nelson reprises his role as Kee-Oth the demon in the two-parter "Play Date" and "The Pit", having first appeared in the third-season episode "Dad's Dungeon". Osborne reprises his recurring role as Finn and Jake's dad, Joshua, in the episode "The Pit". Ron Lynch returns to the series in "Apple Wedding", voicing Mr. Pig. Jeff Bennett reprises his role as Choose Goose in the episode "Blade of Grass", and also voices an alternate-universe version of the character named Choose Bruce in the episode "Finn the Human." Miguel Ferrer reprises his role as Death, and Steve Agee returns as Ash in "Betty". Both Lou Ferrigno, Andy Samberg, and Mark Hamill return in "Billy's Bucket List" as Billy, Party Pat, and the Fear Feaster, respectively.

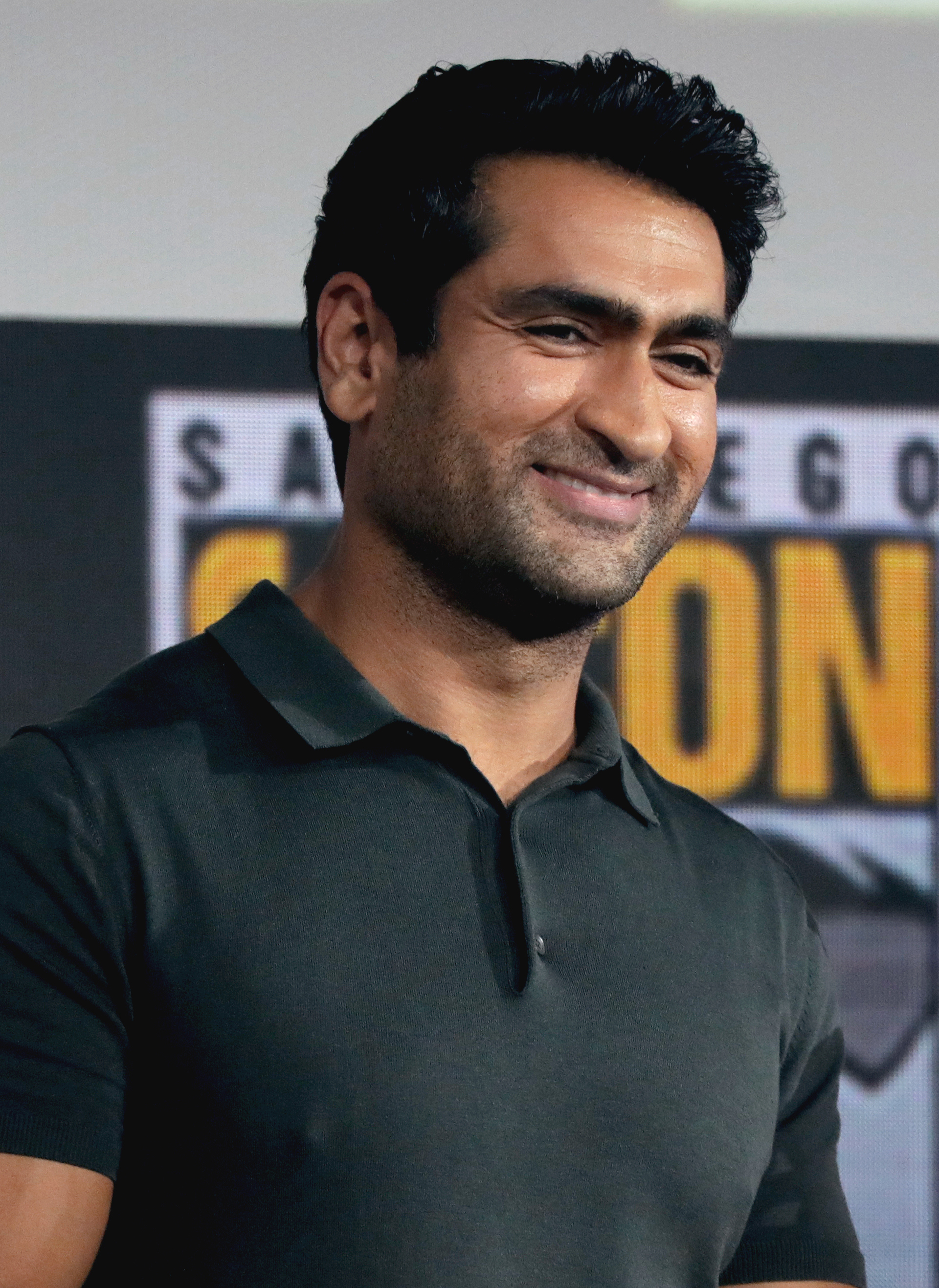
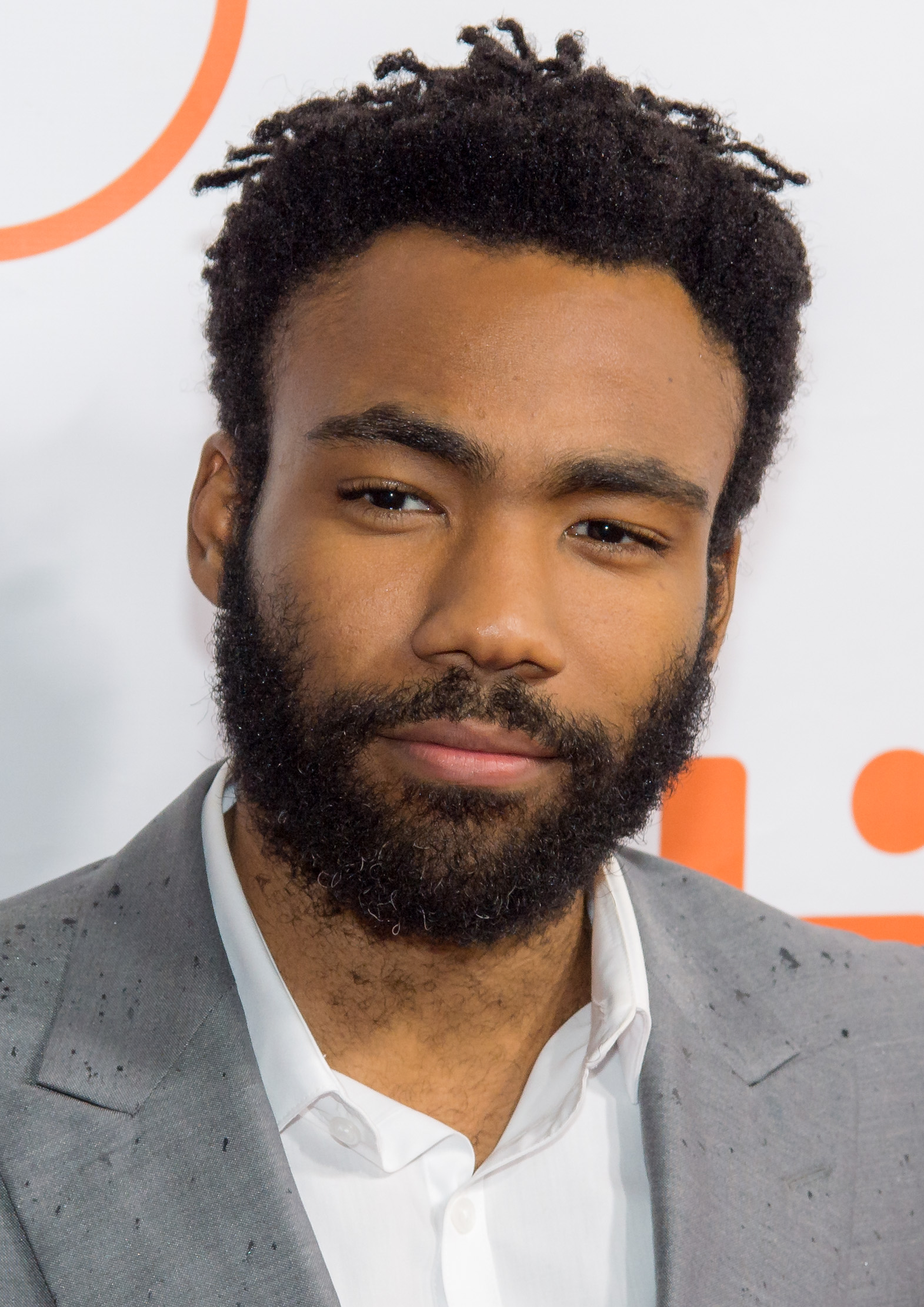
Several guest stars lent their voices to Adventure Time characters for the very first time this season, including Kumail Nanjiani (left) and Donald Glover (right).

The series also regularly employs guest voices for new characters. For instance, in the two-parter "Finn the Human" and "Jake the Dog", Ming-Na Wen voiced Farmworld Finn's mother (as she did in the season four cliffhanger "The Lich"), Kumail Nanjiani appeared as Prismo, and Cloris Leachman plays the role of Farmworld Marceline. Additionally, in "Jake the Dog" and "Frost & Fire", M. Emmet Walsh voices the Cosmic Owl. In "Up a Tree", Jim Cummings voices the Porcupine, Lenny the Beaver, and the Owl; and Marc Maron appears as the squirrel. Cummings would later reappear in the latter season episode "Candy Streets" playing a different character. In "Jake the Dad", Kristen Schaal lends her voice to Jake Jr. (she would reprise the role in the later episodes "One Last Job" and "Another Five Short Graybles"); Choe Dong-Hyun appears as T.V. and Kim Kil Whan; and Sunny Sandler voices both Charlie and Viola. In "Little Dude", Dana Snyder appears as the Ancient Sleeping Magi of Life Giving. With "Bad Little Boy", Donald Glover debuted as Marshall Lee, Marceline's male counterpart. In the episode "Puhoy", Jonathan Frakes voices a grown-up version of Finn, Mandy Siegfriend voices Roselinen, and Wallace Shawn voices an oracle. Levar Burton voices an anthropomorphic bubble in "BMO Lost". Baxter plays the eponymous character in the "James Baxter the Horse". Both Johnny Pemberton and James Adomian appear in the episode "The Suitor", voicing Braco and the demon-possessed Cinnamon Bun, respectively. Series storyboard artist Cole Sanchez voiced the Party God in "Shh!" and "Party's Over, Isla de Señorita"; Riki Lindhome portrayed the female island in the latter episode. The character Tiffany, who had first appeared in a minor role in the first season episode "My Two Favorite People", reappears in "One Last Job". In the first season, he was voiced by Vincenzo Rauso. However, in "One Last Job", he was voiced by Collin Dean. Comedian Melissa Villaseñor appears as Ann the pharmacist in "Candy Streets". Duncan Trussell appears as Ron James in "Wizards Only, Fools" and "Betty".

Dan Mintz appears as T.V. in "Jake Suit". Aziz Ansari, Paul F. Tompkins, and Chuck McCann appear in "Be More", as DMO, one of the SMOs, and Moe Giovanni, respectively. "Sky Witch" features Jill Talley, the wife of Kenny, voicing the eponymous sky witch, Maja. In "The Vault", Isabelle Fuhrman voices Shoko and Paul Scheer voices the Bath Boy Gang Boss. In "Love Games", Katie Crown voices Slime Princess's sister Blargatha, and John Hodgman appears as Elder Plops. Marina Sirtis voices the character Samantha in the episode "The Pit". In "James", Andy Merrill appears as the titular character. In the episode "Root Beer Guy", series' outline writer Jack Pendarvis lends his voice to the character of the same name, and Anne Heche voices the character's wife, Cherry Cream Soda. In addition, Make a Wish Foundation arranged for a 14-year-old named Christopher to be the voice of a background character in "Root Beer Guy". Andy Daly voices the King of Ooo in "Apple Wedding". Rainn Wilson voices the titular character in "Rattleballs". Roddy Piper plays the part of Don John in "The Red Throne". Lena Dunham appears as Betty in the episode of the same name. In "Lemonhope", actor and musician Creed Bratton voices the character Phlannel Boxingday, and Roiland voices the titular character. Series storyboard artist Ako Castuera voices Canyon in "Billy's Bucket List".

Various other characters are voiced by Tom Kenny, Dee Bradley Baker, Maria Bamford, Little, and Kent Osborne.

== Broadcast and reception ==
=== Ratings ===
The season debuted on November 12, 2012, with the two-part episode "Finn the Human"/"Jake the Dog". Together, both episodes were watched by 3.435 million viewers. This marked a drastic increase of almost one million viewers when compared to the previous season premiere, as well as the previous season finale. The season opener was also the most-watched episode of the season. Aside from the season opener, "Jake the Dad", "Bad Little Boy", and "Frost & Fire" were the only other episodes of the season to garner over 3 million viewers, and they were watched by 3.19, 3.077, and 3.009 million viewers, respectively. On March 29, 2013, it was reported that the show averaged roughly 2 to 3 million viewers per episode. The season concluded with "Billy's Bucket List" on March 17, 2014. The episode was viewed by 2.335 million viewers, marking a slight decrease in viewers when compared to the season four finale "The Lich" which was viewed by 2.589 million viewers.

=== Reviews and accolades ===
Eric Kohn of IndieWire praised the beginning of the season for being "irreverent and narratively engaging". He called it "the ideal testament to animation's glorious pliability in an [sic] commercial arena otherwise defined by restrictions." Kohn felt that the show's exploration of "sad subtext"—such as the series' mysterious Mushroom War and the relationship between Marceline and the Ice King—and the characters' abilities to "deny the bad vibes their surrounding world invites" via "cheery songs and vibrant artwork" were some of the series strongest points. He was particularly pleased with the season opener, calling it an "interesting creative challenge". Kohn later published an article explaining why "'Adventure Time' is the best Sci-Fi show on TV right now". He singled out "Simon & Marcy", praising the way in which the episode "deepen[ed] the world [of Ooo] in all kinds of morbidly fascinating ways." Furthermore, he compared the entry to Cormac McCarthy's book The Road, specifically citing the similarities between the mutant creatures in the episode and the "demented people" in the latter. Kohn ultimately concluded that the series' "willingness to contemplate [the themes of the episode] while sticking to its unique combination of silliness and haunting beauty routinely transforms the show into a wondrous genre experiment."

Oliver Sava of The A.V. Club wrote that the season was "experimental" in that the series' writers and storyboard artists "continue to experiment with what they can do in 10 minutes". He specifically cited the plots from the season openers, "All the Little People", and "Shh!" as examples, and applauded the fact that the series was willing to explore different styles of animation, such as in the installment "A Glitch is a Glitch". Rich Goldstein of The Daily Beast argued that the emotional depth of the series increased during this season, highlighting "Simon & Marcy" as an example. Emily Guendelsberger of The A.V. Club later awarded the entire season an "A", noting that "Adventure Time has somehow managed to stay on fire for its fifth season's double-wide 52-episode run." Guendelsberger praised the show's aforementioned creativity and experimentation, and also wrote that "the writing staff has also taken the less-obvious X-Files approach: expanding the length of the stories they're able to tell by linking monster-of-the-week episodes into longer arcs." The A.V. Club later named the series the 27th best television series of 2014, noting that, "The end of the super-sized season five saw a string of conceptually ambitious episodes that blew the world of Ooo wide open, deepening the stories of Lemongrab, Lumpy Space Princess' doomed romance, and Ice King's past as Simon Petrikov." The site selected "Lemonhope" as the stand-out from the season's end. Each episode was also graded by The A.V. Club with a different letter grade; the season received four C's, twenty B's, and twenty-six A's.

In June 2013, the series was nominated for "Best Animated Series" at the 2013 Critics' Choice Television Awards, although it lost to the FX series Archer. At the 65th Primetime Emmy Awards, "Simon & Marcy", was later nominated for a Primetime Emmy Award for Short-format Animation, and former character designer Andy Ristaino won an Emmy for "Outstanding Individual Achievement In Animation" for his character designs in the episode "Puhoy", making it the series' first Emmy win. The episode "Be More" was later nominated for a Primetime Emmy Award for Short-format Animation at the 66th Primetime Emmy Awards in 2014. On July 31, 2014, it was announced that series art director, Nick Jennings, had won an Emmy for "Outstanding Individual Achievement In Animation" for his work on the episode "Wizards Only, Fools".

== Episodes ==
No. overall	No. in season	Title	Directed by (Note: Larry Leichliter served as director for the first part of the season, before the title was phased out solely in favor of "supervising director".)	Written and storyboarded by	Original release date	Prod. code	US viewers (millions)
105	1	"Finn the Human" (Part 1)	Larry Leichliter^{d} Nate Cash^{s}	Tom Herpich & Jesse Moynihan	November 12, 2012	1014-105	3.44
Finn (voiced by Jeremy Shada) and Jake (voiced by John DiMaggio) chase The Lich (voiced by Ron Perlman) through a dimensional portal where they meet Prismo (voiced by Kumail Nanjiani), a wish granter, who tells them that the Lich wished for all life to be extinct. This leads Finn to wish that the Lich "never even ever existed". Finn is then warped to an alternate timeline, where he is a normal human living with his family and his dog Jake on a farm.
106	2	"Jake the Dog" (Part 2)	Larry Leichliter^{d} Adam Muto^{s}	Cole Sanchez & Rebecca Sugar	November 12, 2012	1014-106	3.44
While Finn's alternative timeline goes astray, Prismo tells Jake that if he can make the correct wish, everything will go back to normal. Jake—with help from Prismo—eventually wishes that the Lich had actually desired for Finn and Jake to return home. Thus, the world is righted again.
107	3	"Five More Short Graybles"	Larry Leichliter^{d} Nate Cash^{c}	Tom Herpich & Steve Wolfhard	November 19, 2012	1014-107	2.60
A series of short stories—centered around Finn and Jake, Marceline (voiced by Olivia Olson), Tree Trunks (voiced by Polly Lou Livingston), the Ice King (voiced by Tom Kenny) and BMO (voiced by Niki Yang)—with a common theme revolving around the five tastes, hosted by a mysterious man named Cuber (voiced by Emo Philips) from the future.
108	4	"Up a Tree"	Larry Leichliter^{d} Adam Muto^{c}	Skyler Page & Somvilay Xayaphone	November 26, 2012	1014-108	2.38
Finn and Jake's game of catch goes awry when their frisbee gets stuck in a large tree. Finn decides to fetch it without Jake's help, but he inadvertently gets captured by the residents of the tree, who repeatedly utter the mantra, "In the tree, part of the tree." Finn teams up with a squirrel who is berated for believing he is a flying squirrel (voiced by Marc Maron) and the two successfully escape.
109	5	"All the Little People"	Larry Leichliter^{d} Nate Cash^{c}	Ako Castuera & Jesse Moynihan	December 3, 2012	1014-109	2.53
Finn and Jake find a bag full of miniature versions of their friends invented and given to them by Magic Man (voiced by Kenny). Finn plays with them but begins to toy with their relationships. Later, the duo discover that the small people are actually from an alternate reality and everything that they had done to them was real. However, they are unable to communicate with them and the alternate versions blame everything on the small Finn instead of the real one.
110	6	"Jake the Dad"	Larry Leichliter^{d} Nate Cash^{c}	Tom Herpich & Steve Wolfhard	January 7, 2013	1014-111	3.19
After Lady Rainicorn (voiced by Yang) gives birth to five puppies, Jake—wanting to be a good father—becomes an overprotective parent. Eventually, he realizes that the puppies are not completely helpless and that he should stop babying them.
111	7	"Davey"	Larry Leichliter^{d} Adam Muto^{c}	Skyler Page & Somvilay Xayaphone (Note: On the credit screen for the episode "Davey", it is stated that the episode was storyboarded by Jesse Moynihan and Skyler Page. However, this is erroneous and the episode was actually storyboarded by Page and Somvilay Xayaphone, according to Pendleton Ward.)	January 14, 2013	1014-112	2.31
Finn, after realizing that he is being hindered by people constantly thanking him for being a hero, decides to create an alter ego. He shaves part of his hair, makes a fake mustache, and takes the moniker Davey (voiced by Davey Johnson). However, Davey soon begins to take over Finn's mind, and Jake is forced into action to get his old friend back.
112	8	"Mystery Dungeon"	Larry Leichliter^{d} Nate Cash^{s}	Ako Castuera & Jesse Moynihan	January 21, 2013	1014-113	2.71
Ice King, N.E.P.T.R. (voiced by Andy Milonakis), Tree Trunks, Shelby (voiced by Pendleton Ward) and Lemongrab (voiced by Justin Roiland) find themselves mysteriously trapped in a dungeon and must band together to get out. Eventually, the Ice King reveals that he kidnapped them so that he could use their individual talents to pass successfully through the maze and meet the Ancient Sleeping Magi of Life Giving so that his fan fiction, Fionna and Cake may become reality.
113	9	"All Your Fault"	Larry Leichliter^{d} Nate Cash^{c}	Tom Herpich & Steve Wolfhard	January 28, 2013	1014-115	2.71
Princess Bubblegum (voiced by Hynden Walch) sends Finn and Jake on a mission to the Earls of Lemongrab (voiced by Roiland) in order to investigate a distress message. It is revealed that the Lemongrabs have depleted their food supply by bringing it to life. After Finn and Jake halt their advancing army from taking over the Candy Kingdom to satisfy their appetites, Bubblegum erases the secret to candy life from the Lemongrabs' minds.
114	10	"Little Dude"	Adam Muto^{s}	Cole Sanchez & Michael DeForge	February 4, 2013	1014-114	2.60
Finn's hat comes to life after it is touched by a wizard (voiced by Dana Snyder) who can bring inanimate objects to life. Unfortunately, the hat wants to be placed on someone's head so that it can take them over and fill them with evil. Finn, Jake, and the wizard track the hat down, and manage to turn the hat good.
115	11	"Bad Little Boy"	Larry Leichliter^{d} Adam Muto^{c}	Cole Sanchez & Rebecca Sugar	February 18, 2013	1014-110	3.08
In this episode, several kidnapped princesses have grown bored with Ice King's terrible Fionna and Cake fan fiction stories, so Marceline stops by the Ice Kingdom and tells her own. Marceline's story revolves around her male counterpart, Marshall Lee (voiced by Donald Glover), who tries to flirt with Fionna (voiced by Madeleine Martin).
116	12	"Vault of Bones"	Adam Muto^{s}	Kent Osborne & Somvilay Xayaphone	February 25, 2013	1014-116	2.70
Flame Princess (voiced by Jessica DiCicco) begins to doubt whether or not she is in fact evil. Finn is insistent that she is not evil and takes her on a journey into a dungeon to help her sort out her thoughts. Flame Princess eventually proves to be a lover of destruction, but assures Finn that she only destroys bad guys.
117	13	"The Great Bird Man"	Nate Cash^{s}	Ako Castuera & Jesse Moynihan	March 4, 2013	1014-117	2.58
In the deserted badlands, Finn and Jake get lost but are saved from death by Xergiok (voiced by Johnson), the former goblin king who was deposed by Finn and Jake in the second season episode "The Silent King". He claims to have turned over a new leaf after he lost his sight. However, once it is returned, he threatens to take over the goblin kingdom once again. Eventually, he realizes the errors of his ways and removes his eyes again.
118	14	"Simon & Marcy"	Adam Muto^{s}	Cole Sanchez & Rebecca Sugar (Note: According to Rebecca Sugar, Adam Muto also contributed "additional scenes" to the episode and "did a lot on this one and put it over the top.")	March 25, 2013	1014-118	2.60
Marceline decides to tell Finn and Jake about her and the Ice King's adventures 996 years ago following the "Mushroom War". In her story, Marceline and Simon—the name of the Ice King before he was corrupted by his crown—traverse a ruined city to find chicken soup to cure a cold that Marceline has. Along the way, they are attacked by mutated creatures, forcing Simon to wear the ice crown and slowly lose his mind.
119	15	"A Glitch Is a Glitch"	David OReilly^{g}	David OReilly	April 1, 2013	1014-120	2.00
The Ice King decides to create a computer virus that will delete everyone in Ooo except for him and Princess Bubblegum. Finn and Jake hack into the universal source code and attempt to destroy the virus before they themselves are deleted.
120	16	"Puhoy"	Nate Cash^{s}	Tom Herpich & Steve Wolfhard	April 8, 2013	1014-119	2.75
Finn begins second-guessing his relationship with Flame Princess, so he builds a giant pillow fort. While navigating it, Finn seemingly falls asleep and dreams that he ends up in a pillow world where he marries a pillow woman named Roselinen (Mandy Siegfriend) and has two children with her. Finn eventually wakes up in the real world, and he receives a call from Flame Princess, reaffirming their relationship.
121	17	"BMO Lost"	Nate Cash^{s}	Tom Herpich & Steve Wolfhard	April 15, 2013	1014-123	2.39
BMO is kidnapped by an eagle and then is forced to find a way home. On its way, BMO meets Bubble (voiced by Levar Burton) and a baby, and the three decide to journey home together. BMO and Bubble grow attached to the child until the baby's mother finds and takes her child, devastating BMO. The remaining two make their way back home and profess their love for each other until Jake pops Bubble. BMO's sadness is short-lived, however, as Bubble is revealed to actually be Air, and will now be with BMO forever.
122	18	"Princess Potluck"	Adam Muto^{s}	Kent Osborne & Cole Sanchez	April 22, 2013	1014-122	2.27
Ice King does not get an invitation to the princess' potluck, so he tries to ruin the party in myriad ways, such as sending Gunter—disguised as a princess—to throw fruit punch on everyone, and throwing another party to rival the princess'. Eventually, he attacks the party, but learns that the princesses did invite him via mail, but that he never bothered to read it.
123	19	"James Baxter the Horse"	Adam Muto^{s}	Pendleton Ward & Somvilay Xayaphone	May 6, 2013	1014-124	2.21
Finn and Jake stumble across a horse named James Baxter (voiced by James Baxter) who has the ability to make sad people feel better. Eventually, the two anger the spirit of a deceased creature at a funeral and are nearly killed by it. However, James Baxter arrives at the last moment and cheers the spirit up.
124	20	"Shh!"	Elizabeth Ito^{s}	Graham Falk	May 13, 2013	1014-129	2.35
Finn and Jake make a bet to see who can not talk the longest, and the two use signs to communicate. However, BMO thinks that the two are possessed by a malevolent force and hides in the walls of Finn and Jake's tree house.
125	21	"The Suitor"	Nate Cash^{s}	Jesse Moynihan & Thomas Wellmann	May 20, 2013	1014-130	2.41
Peppermint Butler (voiced by Steve Little) thinks that Princess Bubblegum is working too hard in her lab, so he tries to get her a suitor named Braco (voiced by Johnny Pemberton). Braco ends up bothering Princess Bubblegum so much that she creates him a cyborg-clone of herself to give to him. In the meantime, Peppermint Butler strikes a deal with a demon (voiced by James Adomian) that makes Braco the object of everyone's desire, but physically deformed.
126	22	"The Party's Over, Isla de Señorita"	Elizabeth Ito^{s}	Kent Osborne & Cole Sanchez	May 27, 2013	1014-131	2.11
After another one of his schemes fails to woo Princess Bubblegum, Ice King decides to give up. He takes a boat into the ocean but shipwrecks onto a mysterious island that turns out to be a sentient female (voiced by Riki Lindhome). The island is in a relationship with the Party God (voiced by Sanchez), and Ice King convinces her to break up with him because he treats her poorly. However, the Party God discovers what Ice King has done, and the two engage in a fight. Inspired by this ordeal, Ice King decides to "break up" with Princess Bubblegum.
127	23	"One Last Job"	Nate Cash^{s}	Ako Castuera & Jesse Moynihan	June 10, 2013	1014-121	2.38
Jake Jr. gets involved with a group of troublemakers, and Jake is forced to reunite his old criminal gang—which includes Tiffany (voiced by Collin Dean), Gareth (voiced by Sam Marin), and the Flying Lettuce Brothers—to rescue his daughter. The group is tasked with stealing the "Baker's Shard", the purest form of sugar known. Jake successfully completes the raid, but it is revealed that Jake Jr. set up the entire thing to impress her father.
128	24	"Another Five More Short Graybles"	Nate Cash^{s}	Tom Herpich & Steve Wolfhard	June 17, 2013	1014-132	2.27
A series of short stories—centered around Finn, Jake, and Jake Jr; Cinnamon Bun (voiced by Dee Bradley Baker); the Ice King; the Earls of Lemongrab; and Mr. Fox (voiced by Tom Herpich)—hosted by a mysterious man named Cuber from the future (voiced by Emo Philips).
129	25	"Candy Streets"	Elizabeth Ito^{s}	Luke Pearson & Somvilay Xayaphone	June 24, 2013	1014-133	2.09
Lumpy Space Princess (voiced by Ward) is robbed, but before she is able to explain the details to Finn and Jake, she faints. Finn and Jake decide to play cops and apprehend a suspect that they think is guilty. In the end, however, it is revealed that a pizza delivery boy idiomatically "stole" Lumpy Space Princess's heart, and that no actual theft took place.
130	26	"Wizards Only, Fools"	Nate Cash^{s}	Jesse Moynihan & Thomas Wellmann	July 1, 2013	1014-134	2.50
After Starchy (voiced by Kenny) gets a cold and needs a magic cure, Finn, Jake, and Princess Bubblegum disguise themselves as wizards and sneak into Wizard City. However, Bubblegum keeps insisting to everyone that magic is just a fancy way of explaining science. The three, along with Abracadaniel (voiced by Little) are eventually arrested for impersonating wizards, but manage to break out of prison with the help of a "cold" spell that literally produces cold weather.
131	27	"Jake Suit"	Elizabeth Ito^{s}	Kent Osborne & Cole Sanchez	July 15, 2013	1014-135	2.46
Jake gets upset with the manner in which Finn uses his body as a suit of armor, so he bets Finn that he could not withstand being used as a suit of armor by Jake. Jake forces him to do various things, such as dance in his underwear in front of Flame Princess's extended family or almost jump into a volcano, before he realizes that Finn is indeed good at withstanding the hurdles that Jake throws at him.
132	28	"Be More"	Nate Cash^{s}	Tom Herpich & Steve Wolfhard	July 22, 2013	1014-136	2.67
After BMO accidentally deletes a core system driver, Finn and Jake sneak into the MO factory and fix BMO. However, the three are pursued by security guard SMOs (voiced by Paul F. Tompkins); Finn, Jake, and BMO eventually run into Moseph "Moe" Giovanni (voiced by Chuck McCann), the ancient and benevolent human-cyborg creator of the MOs, who explains BMO's backstory.
133	29	"Sky Witch"	Nate Cash^{s}	Ako Castuera & Jesse Moynihan	July 29, 2013	1014-138	2.08
Marceline enlists Princess Bubblegum's help in order to track Maja the Sky Witch; it is revealed that Marceline's ex-boyfriend Ash sold Marceline's beloved stuffed animal Hambo to Maja. Only when Bubblegum trades her prized rock shirt—which was given to her by Marceline—is Hambo able to be reunited with Marceline.
134	30	"Frost & Fire"	Elizabeth Ito^{s}	Somvilay Xayaphone & Luke Pearson	August 5, 2013	1014-137	3.01
Finn has an interesting dream which involves Flame Princess and Ice King fighting each other, but he wakes up before he can finish it. He then decides to stage a fight between the two in real life to see if he can finish the dream. However, during the fight, Flame Princess destroys the Ice Kingdom and discovers that Finn set up the fight. Feeling betrayed and hurt, she breaks up with Finn.
135	31	"Too Old"	Nate Cash^{s}	Tom Herpich & Steve Wolfhard	August 12, 2013	1014-140	2.38
Finn and Princess Bubblegum travel to the Earldom of Lemongrab for a diplomatic dinner. Finn, in the meantime, tries to woo Bubblegum after his "break-up" with Flame Princess. The two learn that the original Lemongrab is now a tyrant. However, a young lemon child named Lemonhope is discovered, and Bubblegum and Finn are able to successfully take him back to the Candy Kingdom; at the same time, Finn realizes that Bubblegum is indeed too old for him.
136	32	"Earth & Water"	Elizabeth Ito^{s}	Somvilay Xayaphone & Seo Kim	September 2, 2013	1014-141	1.86
Princess Bubblegum tests Flame Princess to understand why her emotions can become volatile. However, Bubblegum leaves Flame Princess in the care of Cinnamon Bun, who frees her and tells her the story of how she was locked up by her father. Flame Princess eventually overthrows her evil father, the Flame King, and installs a government based on honesty. She forgives Finn, but the two only remain friends.
137	33	"Time Sandwich"	Elizabeth Ito^{s}	Kent Osborne & Cole Sanchez	September 9, 2013	1014-139	1.98
Magic Man steals Jake's sandwich and seals himself in a molasses bubble that slows time down. Finn and Jake then call on BMO, Princess Bubblegum, and Marceline in order to get the sandwich back. Eventually, Jake realizes the key to getting into the bubble is to be sad. He musters up all the sadness he can handle and achieves his goal of punching Magic Man, who falls to the ground, breaking the bubble.
138	34	"The Vault"	Nate Cash^{s}	Jesse Moynihan & Ako Castuera	September 16, 2013	1014-142	2.26
Finn begins having nightmares about the Green Lady, an apparition that he saw during the events of the season three episode "The Creeps". Undergoing regression analysis, Finn soon learns that the ghost is connected to a girl named Shoko (voiced by Isabelle Fuhrman), who was one of his past lives. Shoko stole an amulet from Princess Bubblegum during the beginnings of the Candy Kingdom. Upon learning this knowledge, Finn is able to right the wrong that was done in his past life.
139	35	"Love Games"	Elizabeth Ito^{s}	Cole Sanchez, Kent Osborne, & Andy Ristaino	September 23, 2013	1014-143	2.02
Slime Princess (voiced by Maria Bamford) is in need of a husband, lest she will lose her kingdom to her sister Blargatha (voiced by Katie Crown). Finn decides to help her out, but is forced to participate and win various "Love Games" by Elder Plops (voiced by John Hodgman). In the end, it is revealed that Blargatha faked having a husband in the first place; Slime Princess, therefore, retains the crown.
140	36	"Dungeon Train"	Nate Cash^{s}	Tom Herpich & Steve Wolfhard	September 30, 2013	1014-144	2.04
Finn and Jake stumble upon a mysterious train in which each car contains a new villain to fight. Jake soon gets bored with the train; Finn, on the other hand does not wish to leave. Eventually, after realizing that his love for the train will lead to a rift between him and Jake, Finn decides to leave on his own terms.
141	37	"Box Prince"	Elizabeth Ito^{s}	Somvilay Xayaphone & Seo Kim	October 7, 2013	1014-145	1.99
Finn meets the Box Prince—a cat wearing a cardboard box—and learns that the throne of Box Kingdom has been seized by an impostor. Finn must therefore help the Box Prince take back the throne. Meanwhile, BMO and Jake try to extract a piece of a tortilla chip that has lodged itself between two of Jake's teeth.
142	38	"Red Starved"	Nate Cash^{s}	Ako Castuera & Jesse Moynihan	October 14, 2013	1014-146	1.77
Finn, Jake, and Marceline get trapped in a cave. After Jake eats all of Marceline's red snacks, she begins to go "feral" and threatens to eat Jake's blood. Finn sets out to find something red to quench Marceline's hunger, but fails. In the nick of time, Princess Bubblegum arrives, and Marceline is able to satiate herself on part of Bubblegum's pink flesh.
143	39	"We Fixed a Truck"	Elizabeth Ito^{s}	Cole Sanchez & Andy Ristaino	October 21, 2013	1014-147	2.02
Finn, Jake and BMO decide to fix up a truck with the help of Banana Man (voiced by "Weird Al" Yankovic). BMO later stays up all night fixing it, only to hear a radio program claiming that Princess Bubblegum is a mutant reptile. Later on, the four take the newly fixed truck into the Candy Kingdom and learn that Bubblegum was actually replaced by a mutant. With the help of the truck, they save the real Bubblegum and destroy the creature.
144	40	"Play Date"	Elizabeth Ito^{s}	Somvilay Xayaphone, Seo Kim, & Kent Osborne	November 4, 2013	1014-149	1.92
Finn and Jake are tired of Ice King living with them, so they invite Abracadaniel over for a "play date" with Ice King. Abracadaniel and Ice King soon get into trouble, however, when they summon the demon Kee-Oth (voiced by Noah Nelson), who kidnaps Jake.
145	41	"The Pit"	Nate Cash^{s}	Jesse Moynihan & Ako Castuera	November 18, 2013	1014-150	2.27
Kee-Oth the Blood Demon kidnaps Jake and takes him to his demonic dimension and imprisons him in a pit. Finn and Lady Rainicorn team up to save him. While in the pit, Jake meets a humanoid-dog woman named Samantha (voiced by Marina Sirtis). Eventually, Finn and Lady arrive and defeat Kee-Oth and save Jake.
146	42	"James"	Elizabeth Ito^{s}	Cole Sanchez & Andy Ristaino	November 25, 2013	1014-151	2.61
Finn and Jake accompany Princess Bubblegum on her study of the Desert of Wonders. However, they are soon attacked by goo monsters, and Finn and Jake think that Bubblegum's candy helper James (voiced by Andy Merrill) is hindering their rescue. It is revealed that Bubblegum has been sabotaging Finn's plans because they won't work. James then sacrifices himself for the greater good.
147	43	"Root Beer Guy"	Adam Muto^{s}	Graham Falk	December 2, 2013	1014-153	1.84
Root Beer Guy (voiced by Jack Pendarvis) witnesses Finn and Jake abduct Princess Bubblegum, but no one believes him. He eventually decides to take matters into his own hands. In the end, it is revealed that Bubblegum set up the entire situation to test her police force: the banana guards. Because he solved the case, Root Beer Guy is promoted to head of the banana guards.
148	44	"Apple Wedding"	Nate Cash^{s}	Tom Herpich & Steve Wolfhard	January 13, 2014	1014-148	1.86
Tree Trunks and Mr. Pig (voiced by Ron Lynch) arrange for the King of Ooo (voiced by Andy Daly) to marry them. Princess Bubblegum tries to prove that he is a fraud, and when she is unable to find evidence convicting him, she throws everyone—including Tree Trunks and Mr. Pig—in prison. After Tree Trunks performs her own marriage ceremony, Bubblegum relents.
149	45	"Blade of Grass"	Elizabeth Ito^{s}	Somvilay Xayaphone & Seo Kim	January 20, 2014	1014-154	2.61
Finn and Jake decide that it is time for Finn to replace his broken demon blood sword. Finn purchases a sword made of grass from an ominous grass wizard (voiced by Jeff Bennett), but the two soon realize that the new sword is cursed. Finn initially decides to confront the wizard, but after learning to control the weapon, is contented.
150	46	"Rattleballs"	Elizabeth Ito^{s}	Cole Sanchez & Andy Ristaino	January 27, 2014	1014-156	2.21
Finn meets an old sword-fighting robot named Rattleballs (voiced by Rainn Wilson), and learns that Rattleballs was part of an elite force made by Bubblegum long ago to protect the Candy Kingdom; however, the group became too destructive and so they were all destroyed, save for Rattleballs. After a short skirmish, Rattleballs proves that he is not a threat, so Bubblegum relents and does not destroy him.
151	47	"The Red Throne"	Elizabeth Ito^{s}	Somvilay Xayaphone & Seo Kim	February 10, 2014	1014-158	2.11
The Flame King, along with the help of Don John (voiced by Roddy Piper), escapes from his prison and reclaims the throne, forcing Flame Princess to turn to Finn for help. Finn hopes to rekindle his relationship with Flame Princess. Eventually, Cinnamon Bun, Finn, and Flame Princess are able to quell the revolt, and Cinnamon Bun professes his love to Flame Princess, much to Finn's unhappiness.
152	48	"Betty"	Nate Cash^{s} Adam Muto^{s}	Ako Castuera & Jesse Moynihan	February 24, 2014	1014-155	1.71
The Ice King reverts to Simon after being exposed to an anti-magic being named Bella Noche, and gets help from Finn, Jake, and Marceline in order to get Betty (voiced by Lena Dunham), his former fiancée, back. Once he succeeds in bringing her back, however, he begins to die, forcing Betty herself to defeat Bella Noche.
153	49	"Bad Timing"	Adam Muto^{s}	Pendleton Ward & Kent Osborne	March 3, 2014	1014-160	1.45
Lumpy Space Princess runs into with a former classmate named Johnnie (voiced by Mark Proksch) and the two begin a relationship. After Lumpy Space Princess begins to think Johnnie is being wooed by Princess Bubblegum, she uses a time manipulation device invented by Bubblegum to send Johnnie back to before he met her for a "second chance". Unfortunately, Lumpy Space Princess traps Johnnie in a different dimension.
154	50	"Lemonhope"	Nate Cash^{s}	Tom Herpich & Steve Wolfhard	March 10, 2014	1014-152	1.97
155	51	"Lemonhope"	Nate Cash^{s}	Tom Herpich & Steve Wolfhard	March 10, 2014	1014-157	1.97
Lemonhope (voiced by Justin Roiland) grows unhappy with Princess Bubblegum's constant reminders of his responsibility to help the lemon people, haunted by recurring nightmares that pressure him even more. Finally having enough, Lemonhope runs away from the Candy Kingdom to set out on his own adventure to be his own person. But the nightmares persist as he becomes stranded in a desert where he nearly succumbs to death. Eventually, after a long and arduous adventure, Lemonhope resolves to defeat Lemongrab once and for all by using his lyre's pleasing melody to blow up the despot. After Princess Bubblegum can reconstitute Lemongrab into a patchwork creature by grafting spare parts from his clone brother and some deceased Lemon people caught in the blast, Lemonhope turns down the offer to rule the Lemon Kingdom and leaves to live out his life. A thousand years later, an aged Lemonhope returns to the Lemon Kingdom in his final living moments.
156	52	"Billy's Bucket List"	Nate Cash^{s} Adam Muto^{s}	Ako Castuera & Jesse Moynihan	March 17, 2014	1014-159	2.34
Finn finds the late Billy's (voiced by Lou Ferrigno) bucket list and, to honor his memory, decides to complete it. After finishing most of the items, including taking Billy's ex-girlfriend Canyon (voiced by Ako Castuera) on one last motorcycle ride, and conquering his fear of the ocean, an apparition of Billy appears to Finn in the sky, telling him that Finn's biological father is still alive.

- ^d Director
- ^c Creative director
- ^s Supervising director
- ^g Guest director

== Home media ==
Warner Home Video released multiple DVD volumes, such as Jake the Dad, The Suitor, Princess Day, Finn the Human, Frost & Fire, and The Enchiridion which contain episodes from the fifth season. All DVD releases can be purchased on the Cartoon Network Shop, and the individual episodes can be downloaded from both the iTunes Store and Amazon.com.

=== Full season release ===
The full season set was released on DVD and Blu-ray on July 14, 2015.

Adventure Time: The Complete Fifth Season
Set details
Special features
- 52 episodes
- 4-disc set
- 1.78:1 aspect ratio
- Subtitles: English
- English (Dolby Stereo)
- "Adventure Time Forever" featurette
- Animatic clips
- Special Snail Hunt
Release dates
Region 1
Region 4
Region A
Region B
July 14, 2015
September 16, 2015 (Part 1)
November 4, 2015 (Part 2)
July 14, 2015
September 16, 2015 (Part 1)
November 4, 2015 (Part 2)
