= Frost & Fire (Adventure Time) =

- Adventure Time episode
- Finn watches Flame Princess and Ice King fight in the skies above the Ice Kingdom. Oliver Sava of The A.V. Club described this scene as a "Kaiju Flame Princess vs. Kaiju Ice King battle".
- Episode no.: Season 5 Episode 30
- Directed by: Elizabeth Ito (Note: Supervising director); Nick Jennings (Note: Art director)
- Written by: Luke Pearson; Somvilay Xayaphone
- Story by: Kent Osborne; Pendleton Ward; Jack Pendarvis; Adam Muto
- Production code: 1014-137
- Original air date: August 5, 2013
- Running time: 11 minutes

Guest appearance
- M. Emmet Walsh as the Cosmic Owl

Episode chronology
← Previous "Sky Witch"	Next → "Too Old"
- Adventure Time season 5

"Frost & Fire" is the thirtieth episode of the fifth season of the American animated television series Adventure Time. It was written and storyboarded by Luke Pearson and Somvilay Xayaphone, from a story by Kent Osborne, series creator Pendleton Ward, Jack Pendarvis, and showrunner Adam Muto. It originally aired on Cartoon Network on August 5, 2013. The episode guest stars M. Emmet Walsh as the Cosmic Owl.

The series follows the adventures of Finn (voiced by Jeremy Shada), a human boy, and his best friend and adoptive brother Jake (voiced by John DiMaggio), a dog with magical powers to change shape and grow and shrink at will. In this episode, Finn has pleasurable dream which involves Flame Princess (voiced by Jessica DiCicco) and Ice King (voiced by Tom Kenny) fighting each other, but he wakes up before he can finish it. He then decides to stage a fight between the two in real life to see if he can finish the dream. However, during the fight, Flame Princess destroys the Ice Kingdom and discovers that Finn set up the fight. Feeling betrayed, she breaks up with him.

"Frost & Fire" was the last episode of the fifth season to have been storyboarded by Pearson, although he later returned to revise the storyboards for "Earth & Water". "Frost & Fire" was seen by 3.009 million people, making it one of only a handful of season five episodes to be watched by over 3 million viewers.

== Plot ==
After Finn watched his girlfriend, Flame Princess (voiced by Jessica DiCicco) and Ice King (voiced by Tom Kenny) fight, he has a strange dream that gives him a sense of pleasure; however, he is not able to finish it before he wakes up. Entertained, Finn gets Flame Princess and Ice King to fight once more, whereupon Ice King nearly defeats Flame Princess. That night, Finn dreams not of Flame Princess but rather Ice King blasting him with ice. Upon awakening, he realizes that the Cosmic Owl (voiced by M. Emmet Walsh) was in the vision, which Jake interprets to mean that the reverie was prophetic. Jake urges Finn to somehow finish the dream, as Cosmic Owl may be trying to tell Finn something important.

The following day, Finn—in an attempt to once again finish his pleasurable dream—delivers forged notes to both Flame Princess and Ice King; these notes incite the two to fight once again, only this time, Flame Princess grows immense with rages and begins melting the Ice Kingdom. Finn, realizing that he caused this situation, saves the Ice King and confronts Flame Princess, telling her the truth. Feeling betrayed and hurt, she breaks up with Finn and leaves the Ice Kingdom in ruins; it is implied that this is what Cosmic Owl tried to tell Finn in his dream.

== Production ==
"Frost & Fire" was written and storyboarded by Luke Pearson and Somvilay Xayaphone, from a story by Kent Osborne, series creator Pendleton Ward, Jack Pendarvis, and showrunner Adam Muto. This episode was the last fifth-season episode to feature Pearson as a freelance storyboard artist, although he would return to revise storyboards in "Earth & Water", and storyboard both "Football" and "May I Come In?" during the show's seventh season. The episode also marked the first episode that Pendarvis contributed to; Pendarvis joined the writing team in October 2012, after Osborne, a friend of his, asked him to freelance write for the series for two weeks. Eventually, Pendarvis and the writing staff got along so well that he was invited to permanently join the team. During one part in the storyboard, Finn watches as Flame Princess and Ice King fight. Pendarvis, when compiling the outline for the episode, described the sequence as: "[Finn] bites his knuckle like Vera Miles watching the boys fight over her in The Searchers". This visual reference eventually made its way into the final episode.

Santino Lascano, one of the series' background artists and a veteran from the show' first season, noted on his Tumblr that the episode had "a relatively light workload" because it stuck largely to "familiar" locations, such as the Tree Fort and the Ice Kingdom. With that being said, Lascano noted that it was "fun to 'destroy' places [that he] was involved in creating way back in Season 1", a reference to him having helped Dan "Ghostshrimp" James develop the initial look for the series.

== Reception ==
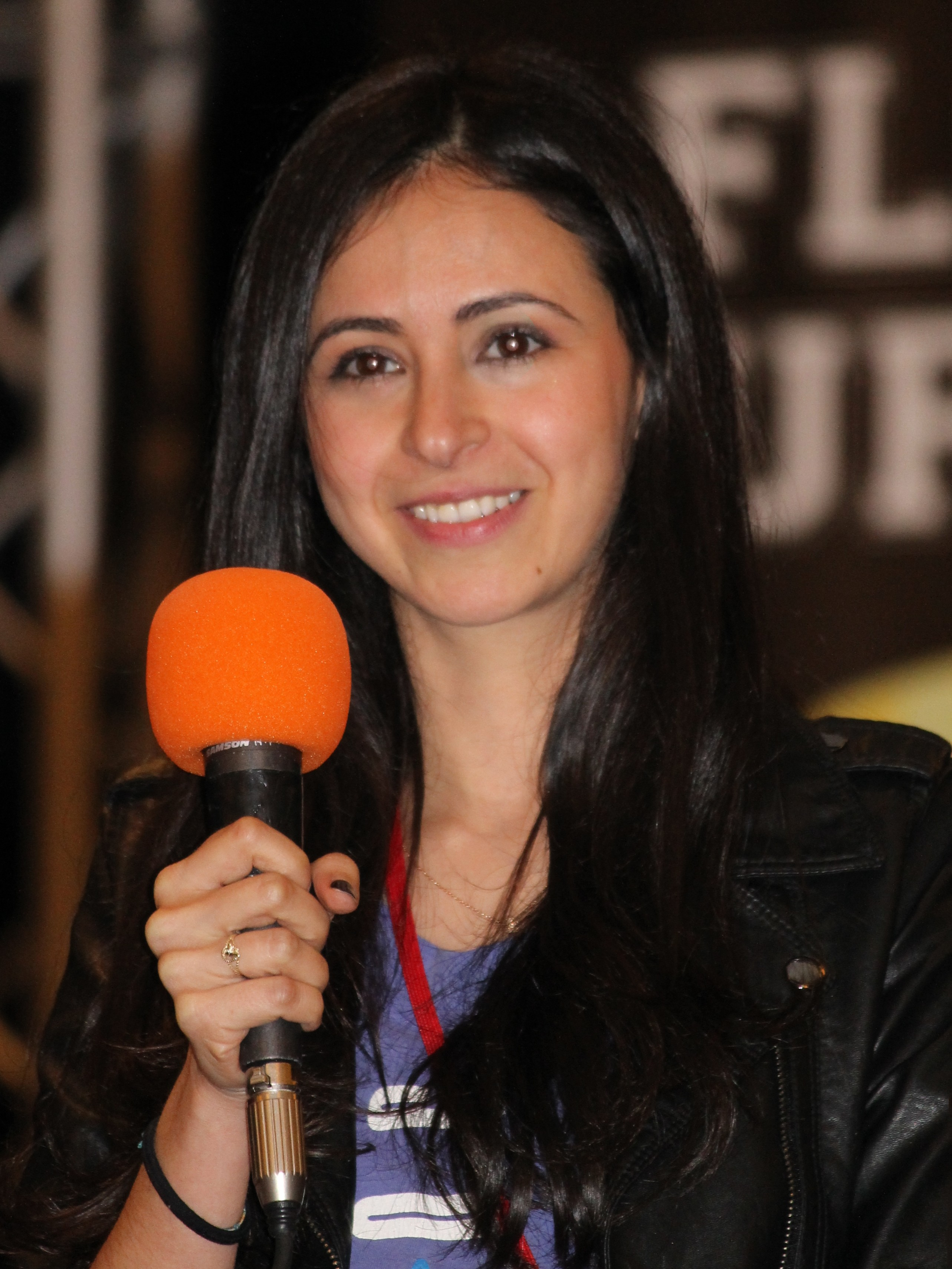
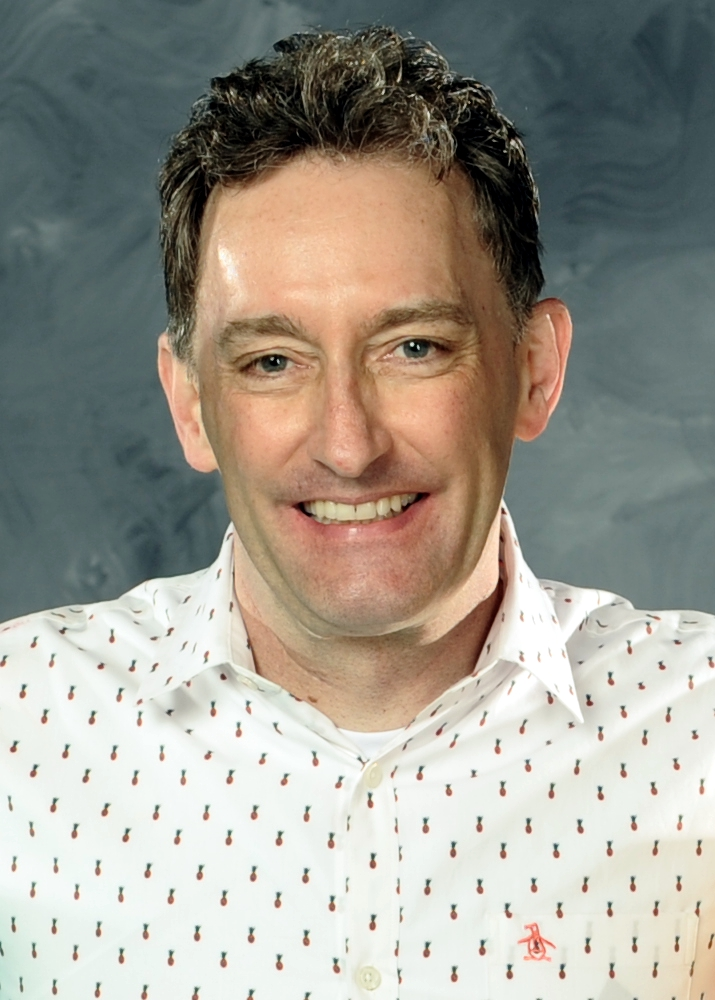
The climactic battle between Flame Princess (voiced by Jessica DiCicco, left) and Ice King (voiced by Tom Kenny, right) was critically commented upon.

"Frost & Fire" aired on Cartoon Network on August 5, 2013. The episode was seen by 3.009 million viewers and scored a 0.7 Nielsen rating in the 18- to 49-year-old demographic. Nielsen ratings are audience measurement systems that determine the audience size and composition of television programming in the United States, which means that the episode was seen by 0.7 percent of all households aged 18 to 49 years old were watching television at the time of the episode's airing. This made it the highest-rated episode of the series since the airing of "Bad Little Boy" in February of the same year. "Frost & Fire" was also one of only four episodes that aired during the show's fifth season—along with "Finn the Human", "Jake the Dog", "Jake the Dad" and "Bad Little Boy"—to be watched by over 3 million viewers.

The episode first saw physical release as part of the 2015 Frost & Fire DVD, which included 16 episodes from the series' first, third, fourth, fifth, and sixth seasons. The episode was later re-released as part of the complete fifth season DVD on July 14, 2015.

Oliver Sava of The A.V. Club awarded the episode an "A", calling it one of his "favorite kind of Adventure Time episode" because it is "a metaphor that speaks to the difficulty of growing up while embracing the unbridled fun of being a kid." Sava complimented the fact that the series was willing to deal with subjects such as puberty and sexuality in dreams. He was also complimentary towards the climactic battle between Flame Princess and Ice King, describing it as a "Kaiju Flame Princess vs. Kaiju Ice King battle". Ultimately, Sava concluded that the episode is proof that "Adventure Time isn’t afraid of changing its characters, and Finn has a major learning experience this week as he sabotages his relationship."
