= Root Beer Guy =

- Adventure Time episode
- Episode no.: Season 5 Episode 43
- Directed by: Adam Muto (Note: Supervising director); Nick Jennings (Note: Art director)
- Written by: Graham Falk
- Story by: Kent Osborne; Pendleton Ward; Jack Pendarvis; Adam Muto
- Original air date: December 2, 2013
- Running time: 11 minutes

Guest appearances
- Jack Pendarvis as Root Beer Guy; Anne Heche as Cherry Cream Soda

Episode chronology
← Previous "James"	Next → "Apple Wedding"
- Adventure Time season 5

"Root Beer Guy" is the forty-third episode of the fifth season of the American animated television series Adventure Time. The episode was written and storyboarded by Graham Falk, from a story by Kent Osborne, Pendleton Ward, Jack Pendarvis, and Adam Muto. It originally aired on Cartoon Network on December 2, 2013. Pendarvis voices the title character, and guest star Anne Heche voices the character's wife, Cherry Cream Soda.

The series follows the adventures of Finn (voiced by Jeremy Shada), a human boy, and his best friend and adoptive brother Jake (voiced by John DiMaggio), a dog with magical powers to change shape and grow and shrink at will. In this episode, Root Beer Guy (voiced by Jack Pendarvis) witnesses Finn and Jake abduct Princess Bubblegum, but no one believes him. He eventually decides to take matters into his own hands. In the end, it is revealed that Bubblegum set up the entire situation to test her police force: the banana guards. Because he solved the case, Root Beer Guy is promoted to head of the banana guards.

"Root Beer Guy" was the second episode of the season to have been storyboarded by Falk, who was a guest artist on the show. Originally, the writers considered asking author Stephen King to voice the eponymous character, although he was never actually approached. The episode was viewed by 1.842 million viewers, and Oliver Sava of The A.V. Club praised the episode for its introduction of new characters with depth, and for its parodying of detective fiction.

== Plot ==
Root Beer Guy (voiced by Jack Pendarvis) is a candy citizen with a dead-end job; as a method of escapism, he often tries his hand at writing a crime and detective novel. One night, while working at his typewriter, he oversees Finn and Jake kidnapping Princess Bubblegum. He tells his wife, Cherry Cream Soda (voiced by Anne Heche), who brushes Root Beer Guy's story off as a dream. Root Beer Guy decides to take matters into his own hands, and he begins investigating. After being told forcefully by Finn and Jake to drop the case, Root Beer Guy soon discovers that they recently purchased suspicious materials and are headed out to Lake Butterscotch, possibly to dispose of a body.

Root Beer Guy follows them, only to witness them throwing what appears to be Princess Bubblegum into the lake. In a desperate attempt to alert the authorities, he calls the banana guards and tells them that he himself kidnapped the princess. They arrive to arrest him, but soon Bubblegum emerges from the lake and admits that the entire scheme was a set up to test the banana guard's sleuthing skills. Soon, the princess learns that Root Beer Guy was the one who actually solved the case, and she promotes him to head of the security force.

== Production ==
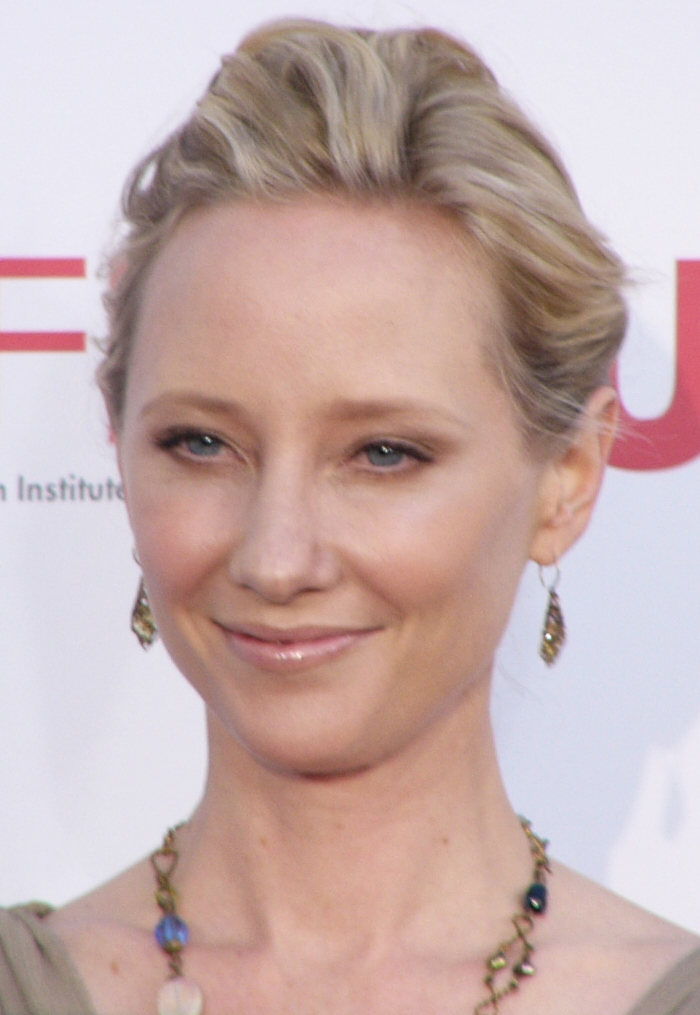
The episode guest starred Anne Heche as Cherry Cream Soda.

"Root Beer Guy" was written and storyboarded by guest artist Graham Falk, from a story by Kent Osborne, Pendleton Ward, Jack Pendarvis, and Adam Muto. The basis for the episode was largely developed by Muto, who wrote the outline concerning a "Candy Kingdom everyman" whose life is changed after witnessing a crime. Pendarvis added the writer element to the character. Falk substantially fleshed out the story during the storyboarding process. This marked the second time that Falk had guest-storyboarded an episode of the series, after the earlier season five episode "Shh!" Art direction was handled by Nick Jennings, whereas supervising direction was helmed by Muto.

Pendarvis voiced the title character after Osborne and Muto suggested that he do it. Reportedly, the staff thought about asking horror writer Stephen King, but he was never approached. Pendarvis agreed to play the part and—because he lives in Mississippi—he flew down in May 2013 to record his lines. Anne Heche was first considered to voice Cherry Cream Soda after Pendarvis noted that her character was similar to Maggie Pistone, a character that Heche had played in the 1997 crime film Donnie Brasco. Osborne, a noted fan of Heche, seconded the idea, and Heche was approached about the part. The episode also featured a vocal cameo by Christopher Monahan, a 14-year-old who was able to appear on the show thanks to the Make-a-Wish Foundation; he voiced Gum Drop Guy.

== Reception ==
"Root Beer Guy" aired on December 2, 2013 on Cartoon Network. The episode was watched by 1.842 million viewers, and received a Nielsen household rating of 1.2. Nielsen ratings are audience measurement systems that determine the audience size and composition of television programming in the United States, which means that the episode was seen by 1.2 percent of all households at the time of the broadcast. The episode was the 4th most-watched episode aired by Cartoon Network for the week of December 2–8, 2013.

Oliver Sava of The A.V. Club awarded the episode an "A", applauding the episode for both fully committing to parodying elements of detective fiction, and for introducing a likable character with a developed backstory. Sava also complimented Falk's storyboarding abilities, writing that the resultant episode "has a confident artistic voice that proudly caters to older viewers, using the tropes of crime fiction to tell a poignant story about one man’s desperate quest for purpose."

Eric Thurm of Complex called the episode "the perfect episode to show some [sic] skeptical of Adventure Time's storytelling skills." He called the eponymous character "one of the best one-off characters the show has created", and cited the episode as an example of the series' ability to craft intricate, interesting, and developed characters. He also applauded the fact that "it's adorable."
