= James Baxter (animator) =

British character animator

- Baxter in 2017
- Education: West Surrey College of Art and Design
- Occupation: Animator
- Years active: 1987–present
- Employer(s): Walt Disney Animation Studios (1987–1997; 2023); DreamWorks Animation (1996–2006, 2008–2018); Cartoon Network Studios (2013, 2017, 2019, 2025); Netflix (2017–present)

James Baxter is a British character animator. He attended the West Surrey College of Art and Design before working for Walt Disney Animation Studios, including various characters in Who Framed Roger Rabbit, Belle in Beauty and the Beast, Rafiki in The Lion King, and Quasimodo in The Hunchback of Notre Dame.

After The Hunchback of Notre Dame, Baxter moved over to DreamWorks Animation working on films such as The Prince of Egypt, The Road to El Dorado, Spirit: Stallion of the Cimarron, Shrek 2, and Madagascar. Early in 2005, Baxter left DreamWorks and set out on his own as an independent animator. He became the head of his own studio, James Baxter Animation in Pasadena, California where he has directed the animation for the 2007 film Enchanted and the opening credits to DreamWorks' Kung Fu Panda. In 2008, Baxter closed his studio and returned to DreamWorks as a supervising animator. While at DreamWorks, Baxter worked on films including Monsters vs. Aliens, How to Train Your Dragon, and The Croods. In 2017, Baxter left DreamWorks once again and went to work for Netflix.

== Filmography ==
Year	Title	Credits	Characters
1988	Who Framed Roger Rabbit	Animator	
1989	Tummy Trouble (Short)	Animator	
1989	The Little Mermaid	Character Animator	Ariel
1990	DuckTales the Movie: Treasure of the Lost Lamp	Character Animator	
1990	The Rescuers Down Under	Character Animator	Joanna, Rescue Aid Society Mice, Insects, Wilbur
1991	Beauty and the Beast	Supervising Animator	Belle
1993	The Making of "The Hitch-Hiker's Guide to the Galaxy" (Video documentary)	Additional Animator	
1994	The Lion King	Supervising Animator	Rafiki
1996	The Hunchback of Notre Dame	Character Designer/Visual Development / Supervising Animator	Quasimodo
1998	The Prince of Egypt	Animator	Moses
2000	The Road to El Dorado	Senior Supervising Animator	Tulio
2002	Spirit: Stallion of the Cimarron	Senior Supervising Animator	Spirit
2003	Sinbad: Legend of the Seven Seas	Supervising Animator	Sinbad
2004	Shrek 2	Supervising Animator	
2005	Madagascar	Additional Supervising Animator	
2006	Curious George	Animation Supervisor: James Baxter Animation	
2007	Enchanted	Animation Supervisor: James Baxter Animation	
2008	Kung Fu Panda	Animation Director: Dream Sequence, James Baxter Animation	
2008	Kung Fu Panda: Secrets of the Furious Five (Video short)	Special Thanks	
2009	Monsters vs. Aliens	Animator	
2010	How to Train Your Dragon	Animator	
2010	Kung Fu Panda Holiday (TV Short)	Animator	
2011	Adam and Dog	Animator	
2012	Gravity Falls (TV Series)	Additional Animator – 2 Episodes	
2012	Rise of the Guardians	Concept Artists – Uncredited	
2013	The Croods	Head of Character Animation and Animator: 2D Sequence	
2013	Adventure Time (TV Series)	Voice / Animator – 2 Episodes and Character Designer – 1 Episode	James Baxter the Horse
2014	How to Train Your Dragon 2	Supervising Animator	Valka
2016	Trolls	Additional Animation	
2017	Regular Show (TV Series)	Additional Animator – 1 Episode	
2017	Samurai Jack (TV Series)	Additional Animation - 1 Episode	
2018	Mary Poppins Returns	Animator	
2019	Steven Universe (TV Series)	Additional Animation - 1 Episode	
2019	Klaus	Animator	
2020	Close Enough	Main Title Animation	
2020	Wolfwalkers	Animator	
2021	Vivo	2D Development	
2021	Centaurworld	Animator - Uncredited	
2023	Once Upon a Studio	Animator	Belle, the Beast, Quasimodo, Rafiki
2025	The Wonderfully Weird World of Gumball	Animator	

== Awards and honors ==
Baxter received an Annie Award for character animation on Kung Fu Panda at the 36th Annie Awards in 2009.

In 2018, Baxter, along with fellow animators Stephen Hillenburg (months before his death), Amanda Forbis, and Wendy Tilby won the Winsor McCay Award at the 2018 Annie Awards.

== In popular culture ==
In May 2013, Baxter was a guest animator for an episode of the 5th season of Adventure Time entitled "James Baxter the Horse". The episode's story focused on the lead characters trying to emulate a horse who can cheer everyone up by neighing his name (James Baxter) and balancing on a beach ball. Both the horse's animation and voice were provided by Baxter. The episode's title card features a drawing of the horse drawing a horse on a beach ball, while sitting at an animation table. A second episode focusing on the character's origins, "Horse and Ball", aired during the show's eighth season with Baxter once again animating and voicing the character.

== Personal life ==
Baxter is married to Kendra. They also have two children.
