= Nate Cash =

American writer, artist, director

- Occupations: Writer, artist, director
- Years active: 2002–present
- Known for: SpongeBob SquarePants; The Marvelous Misadventures of Flapjack; Adventure Time; Over the Garden Wall

Nate Cash is an American writer, artist and director best known for his work on SpongeBob SquarePants, Adventure Time, and Over the Garden Wall. He was nominated for a Daytime Emmy Award for "Outstanding Direction in an Animated Program" in 2012.

== Career ==
Cash began his career on The Simpsons as a character layout artist. He started working at Cartoon Network Studios on The Powerpuff Girls and was later a storyboard artist on My Gym Partner's a Monkey. He was a writer and storyboard director on the biggest hit from Nickelodeon, SpongeBob SquarePants, from 2006 to 2011. After he left SpongeBob, he became a storyboard supervisor on Adventure Time in Season 2 and later creative director. He left Adventure Time at the end of Season 5 completely to work on the miniseries Over the Garden Wall as a creative director alongside Bert Youn, created by another former creative director of the same show named Patrick McHale. Following his leave from Adventure Time, he was replaced by Andres Salaff.

== Filmography ==
=== Film ===
Year	Title	Notes
2003	The Powerpuff Girls: Twas The Fight Before Christmas	Storyboard Clean-Up
2009	Square Roots: The Story of SpongeBob SquarePants	Himself
2009	SpongeBob's Truth or Square	Storyboard Director & Writer
2019	The Angry Birds Movie 2	Story Artist

=== Television ===
Year	Title	Notes
2002–2003	The Simpsons	Character Layout Artist (Seasons 13-14)
2003–2004	The Powerpuff Girls	Storyboard Clean-Up (Seasons 5-6); Story (Season 6)
2004–2005	Foster's Home for Imaginary Friends	Character Designer & Storyboard Revisionist (Seasons 1-2)
2006–2007	My Gym Partner's a Monkey	Storyboard Artist
2006–2011	SpongeBob SquarePants	Storyboard Director & Writer (Seasons 4-8); Songwriter ("New Digs")
2008	The Mighty B!	Storyboard Revisionist
2009	The Marvelous Misadventures of Flapjack	Writer & Storyboard Artist ("Shut It!" & "Under the Sea Monster")
2011–2014	Adventure Time	Storyboard Supervisor (2011–2012); Creative Director (2012–2013); Voice Director ("The Great Bird Man," "Simon & Marcy", & "Puhoy"); Supervising Director (Season 5)
2014	Over the Garden Wall	Creative Director (Episodes 1-6) & Supervising Director
2015	Star vs. the Forces of Evil	Writer & Storyboard Artist ("The Banagic Incident")
2015	Pickle and Peanut	Writer & Storyboard Artist ("A Cabbage Day Miracle")
2018	Summer Camp Island	Storyboard Supervisor
2020	ThunderCats Roar	Supervising Producer
2020–2021	Animaniacs	Supervising Producer
2021	Aquaman: King of Atlantis	Consulting Producer
2021	DC Super Hero Girls	Co-executive Producer
2023–2025	Tiny Toons Looniversity	Showrunner
2026	Adventure Time: Side Quests	Showrunner
