= Adam Muto =

American writer

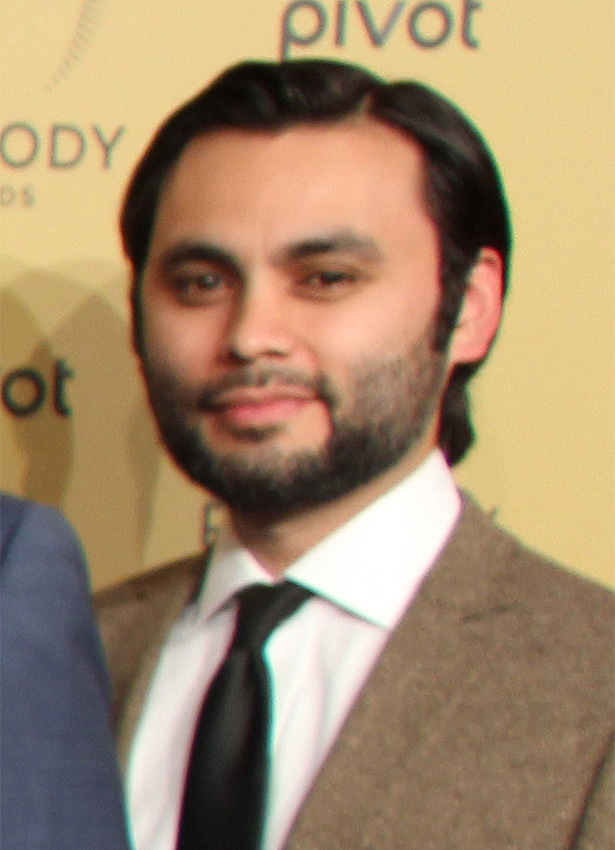
- Muto in 2015
- Born: Seattle, Washington, U.S.
- Years active: 2006–present
- Known for: Animation, comics
- Notable work: Writer, storyboard artist, animator, producer

Adam Muto is an American writer, storyboard artist, animator, and producer known for his work as the executive producer and showrunner of the animated television series Adventure Time.

== Career ==
Muto was a classmate of Adventure Time creator Pendleton Ward at CalArts. When Ward was first working on the Adventure Time pilot for the Frederator incubator series Random! Cartoons, Muto assisted him by drawing props. Eventually, Muto went on to work on the television series, serving as a storyboard artist. During the show's first season, he was partnered with Elizabeth Ito, but during the show's second and third seasons, he was partnered with Rebecca Sugar. During the following year, he was promoted to creative director, and midway through the show's fifth season, he was promoted to supervising producer, then co-executive producer. From mid-season five until the show's conclusion, he served as the show's showrunner and executive producer (following Ward's stepping down sometime during the production of season five).

== Awards ==
Adam Muto's work on Adventure Time gained him two Primetime Emmy Awards for two episodes: "Jake the Brick" in 2015 and "Islands Part 4: Imaginary Resources" in 2017.

== Filmography ==
Year	Title	Role
2006–07	Random! Cartoons	Creator ("SamSquatch" short)
2010–18	Adventure Time	Storyline writer, storyboard artist, director, creative director (Seasons 3–5), supervising director (Seasons 5–9), supervising producer (2013–2014), co-executive producer, executive producer (Season 6–10), showrunner (Season 5–10)
2018	Summer Camp Island	Additional storyboard artist (Season 1)
2019	Steven Universe	Writer, storyboard artist (Season 5, Future)
2020	Adventure Time: Distant Lands	Executive producer, storyline writer, storyboard artist
2021	City of Ghosts	Voice of Walter
2023–25	Adventure Time: Fionna and Cake	Developer, executive producer, showrunner
