= King Worm =

- Adventure Time episode
- Episode no.: Season 4 Episode 18
- Directed by: Larry Leichliter (Note: Director); Adam Muto (Note: Creative director); Nick Jennings (Note: Art director)
- Written by: Steve Wolfhard; Somvilay Xayaphone; Bert Youn
- Story by: Patrick McHale; Kent Osborne; Pendleton Ward
- Production code: 1008-096
- Original air date: August 13, 2012
- Running time: 11 minutes

Guest appearance
- Erik Estrada as King Worm

Episode chronology
← Previous "BMO Noire"	Next → "Lady & Peebles"
- Adventure Time season 4

"King Worm" is the eighteenth episode of the fourth season of the American animated television series Adventure Time. The episode was written and storyboarded by Steve Wolfhard, Somvilay Xayaphone, and Bert Youn, from a story by Patrick McHale, Kent Osborne, and Pendleton Ward. It originally aired on Cartoon Network on August 13, 2012, and guest stars Erik Estrada as the titular King Worm.

The series follows the adventures of Finn (voiced by Jeremy Shada), a human boy, and his best friend and adoptive brother Jake (voiced by John DiMaggio), a dog with magical powers to change shape and grow and shrink at will. In this episode, Finn and Jake find themselves trapped in their own subconscious by the King Worm (voiced by Estrada), expanding upon the final scene of the season one episode "Evicted!". Eventually, Finn is able to escape the reverie by focusing on his inner-most fears; doing so causes the dream to quickly become a nightmare, wrecking the integrity of the dreamscape and forcing King Worm to flee.

The episode, inspired by popular "YouTube poop" videos, was an attempt to craft an episode that would feature bizarre and absurd visuals; it also marked the first time that Wolfhard would storyboard for the series. The episode ranked first in its timeslot, but was met with mixed reviews from critics. Oliver Sava of The A.V. Club felt that the installment was too absurd, resulting in confusion for the viewer. Nicole Klein of Geekadelphia and Jack O'Keefe of Screenrant, however, both praised the show's use of dream imagery and its exploration of Finn's subconscious.

== Plot ==
Finn wakes up to discover that Princess Bubblegum (voiced by Hynden Walch) is now his wife and he is now the king of the Candy Kingdom, however things begin to hint that reality is not what it seems. Peppermint Butler (voiced by Steve Little) tells Finn that he is trapped in a dream and that he needs to find the King Worm (voiced by Erik Estrada) and break it. The scene shifts, and Finn is at first being fed soup by Flame Princess (voiced by Jessica DiCicco), then he is in a library. Peering through a window, he sees Jake, who is being given advice on how to wrap a present by a deformed Lady Rainicorn. (Note: Lady Rainicorn is normally voiced by Niki Yang. In this episode, however, her dream-version is voiced by Tom Kenny.) The two brothers conclude that they are trapped in a dream, and set off, trailing the King Worm.

They eventually meet up with the Ice King (voiced by Tom Kenny), who is trying to outrun giant monsters made up of morphed-together penguins. Finn and Jake then see their father, Joshua, knitting a scarf. The scarf turns into the King Worm, and the duo give chase. On the top of a mountain, they find the worm frozen, and Finn manages to shatter it, seemingly waking the two from their dream state. However, Finn soon discovers that he is still dreaming and that Jake was not actually with him, but rather another figment of the dream. The King Worm actually presents himself and taunts Finn. Finn, however, unleashes his subconscious fears, and the emotional trauma begins to destroy the dreamscape, weakening King Worm's hold. Eventually, the fears become so powerful that the King Worm is defeated, and Finn wakes up in the real world. He and Jake promptly evict the King Worm from their house.

== Production ==
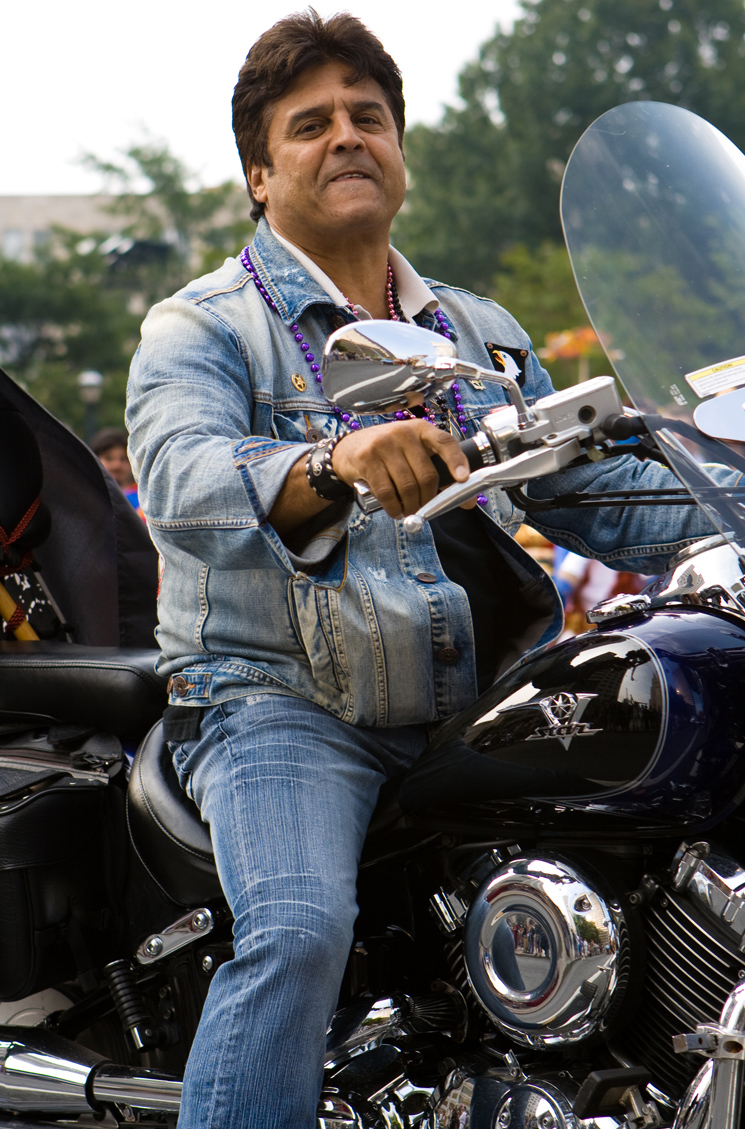
The episode guest stars Erik Estrada, who voices the titular King Worm.

"King Worm" was written and storyboarded by Steve Wolfhard, Somvilay Xayaphone, and Bert Youn. This marked the first time that Wolfhard was credited as a storyboard artist. This is due to the fact that he was largely responsible for storyboarding the episodes third act. At this time in the show's production, Wolfhard was only a storyboard revisionist, and as such, he originally was supposed to have only revised the act. However, he added so much to the section that he was credited as the episode's third storyboard artist. Initially, series creator Pendleton Ward felt that Wolfhard's scenes were not effective; he wanted Finn's nightmares to be composed largely of "scary, dream imagery". Upon further consideration, however, he changed his mind, applauding how the section focuses on Finn's personal fears. The episode's story itself was developed by Ward, Patrick McHale, and Kent Osborne. It was directed by Larry Leichliter.

Ward's goal for the episode was "to weird it up" and play off bizarre ideas and imagery. Ward latter revealed on his Twitter that many scenes were inspired by popular "YouTube poops", which are idiosyncratic and often nonsensical mashups which have been uploaded on the video site YouTube; Ward explained that he enjoyed the concept of poops and wanted to put them in the episode. While storyboarding the episode, Xayaphone exaggerated the elongation of Finn's ears; this was originally going to be revised, but Ward liked that the effect because it fit in with the concept of an unstable and unreliable dream world.

The episode features Erik Estrada, voicing the titular King Worm. He had originally voiced the character in the first season episode "Evicted!" Tom Kenny did the voice of Lady Rainicorn. The episode was also embedded with references to future episodes. For instance, the large penguin monster, designed by Michael DeForge, later appeared in "Reign of Gunters". Similarly, "The Lich", the fourth-season finale, had already been storyboarded by the time "King Worm" was entering into production. As a result, the crew was able to take the model of the alternate universe Finn—who is introduced at the end of "The Lich"—and add him as a mirror reflection in "King Worm".

At the end of "Evicted!", Finn and Jake encounter the King Worm, who puts them in a trance; the ending of "King Worm", however, seems to imply that Finn and Jake were stuck in a trance between the events of "Evicted!" and "King Worm". This could be interpreted as suggesting that the events between the two episodes existed only as part of an elongated dream. Ward, however, stated in the DVD commentary for the episode that such an idea bothered him, because he did not want to destroy the reality of the series. In the end, he noted that he wanted to preserve the status quo by making "the real Finn where he is now ... he isn't still dreaming." Adam Muto later noted on his Spring.me account that, were the events between "Evicted!" and "King Worm" to have existed only as a part of a dream, then "there wouldn't be much point to that."

== Reception ==
“King Worm” first aired on Cartoon Network on August 13, 2012. According to Nielsen ratings, the episode ranked first in its timeslot among children aged 2–11 and 6–11, as well as in all boy demographics. The episode first saw physical release as part of the 2014 DVD, The Suitor, which included 16 episodes from the series' first five seasons. It was later re-released as part of the complete fourth season DVD in October 2014.

Oliver Sava of The A.V. Club awarded the episode a "C", largely criticizing the installment for its apparent randomness. He argued that "being in a dream allows the writers to do whatever they want without any explanation, meaning characters and environments change suddenly and constantly, leaving the viewer as confused as Finn." Sava felt that the only scenes with any pathos were to be found near the end of the episode, but even they were "still more focused on bizarre imagery than emotional depth", such as the sequence wherein Finn's fears manifest themselves by emerging from his navel. Sava did compliment the episode's designs, however, writing that "this episode puts the show’s off-kilter design sense on full display."

Nicole Klein of Geekadelphia, however, applauded the episode's exploration of Finn's psyche, noting that she was pleased with this episode and the fifth season episode "The Vault" because she "love[s] any episode that involves going into Finn’s crazy subconsciousness". Screenrant writer Jack O'Keefe named the episode one of the best television dream sequences, writing: "Adventure Time dips into the surreal often and without hesitation, making it nearly impossible to pick a stand-out dream sequence. However, the dream sequence that makes up 'King Worm' is one of Adventure Time‘s highest artistic achievements among many."
