= Lady & Peebles =

- Adventure Time episode
- Ricardio reveals his new body, which was based on the finale incarnation of Majora, a character from the eponymous 2000 video game The Legend of Zelda: Majora's Mask.
- Episode no.: Season 4 Episode 19
- Directed by: Larry Leichliter (Note: Director); Adam Muto (Note: Creative director); Nick Jennings (Note: Art director)
- Written by: Cole Sanchez; Rebecca Sugar
- Story by: Patrick McHale; Kent Osborne; Pendleton Ward
- Production code: 1008-098
- Original air date: August 20, 2012
- Running time: 11 minutes

Guest appearance
- George Takei as Ricardio

Episode chronology
← Previous "King Worm"	Next → "You Made Me"
- Adventure Time season 4

"Lady & Peebles" is the nineteenth episode of the fourth season of the American animated television series Adventure Time. The episode was written and storyboarded by Cole Sanchez and Rebecca Sugar, from a story by Patrick McHale, Kent Osborne, and Pendleton Ward. It originally aired on Cartoon Network on August 20, 2012. The episode guest stars George Takei as Ricardio.

The series follows the adventures of Finn (voiced by Jeremy Shada), a human boy, and his best friend and adoptive brother Jake (voiced by John DiMaggio), a dog with magical powers to change shape and grow and shrink at will. In this episode, Princess Bubblegum (voiced by Hynden Walch) and Lady Rainicorn (voiced by Niki Yang) go searching for Finn and Jake, who have been missing for three weeks after fighting with the Ice King (voiced by Tom Kenny). It is revealed that Ricardio, the Ice King's living heart, has trapped them and wishes to marry Bubblegum. Bubblegum eventually defeats Ricardio in hand-to-hand combat, and saves the day.

"Lady & Peebles" featured the return of Takei, who had previously voiced Ricardio in the first season episode, "Ricardio the Heart Guy". Several video games inspired elements of the episode, including The Legend of Zelda: Majora's Mask, Eternal Darkness: Sanity's Requiem and Amnesia: The Dark Descent. "Lady & Peebles" was watched by 2.754 million people and received largely positive critical attention, with Oliver Sava of The A.V. Club praising Takei's voice acting, and Richard Whittaker of The Austin Chronicle applauding the female-centric nature of the episode. The episode was later nominated for an Annie Award.

== Plot ==
Princess Bubblegum and Lady Rainicorn investigate a mysterious black ice cave, fearing that Finn and Jake may have been captured by the Ice King on a routine expedition. Once inside the cave, Lady and Bubblegum enter into a biologically-engineered dungeon and are attacked by mysterious hand-like creatures that attempt to grab them. Lady manages to phase through a wall, and the two hear the Ice King's voice coming from a ventilation shaft. Inside the shaft, the two are attacked by a giant tongue before they enter into a room covered with eyes. As Bubblegum and Lady approach the room's exit, the eyes activate and shoot laser at the duo, incapacitating Lady.

Bubblegum plods on in the dark, carrying an unconscious Lady around her shoulders. Suddenly, she stumbles upon the disemboweled body of the oblivious Ice King. From the dark, Ricardio, the living heart of the Ice King, introduces himself, tossing an unconscious Finn and Jake into the light. Ricardio reveals that he built himself both a body as well as the dungeon complex in an attempt to impress Bubblegum. He reveals that he wishes to marry her; Bubblegum agrees to marry Ricardio if he can beat her in hand-to-hand combat. After a short fight, Bubblegum disarms Ricardio and forces him to flee, wounded, into the darkness. Later, at the Candy Kingdom, Finn, Jake, the Ice King, and Lady recover, Bubblegum creates a new heart for the Ice King, and Lady reveals to Jake that she is pregnant.

== Production ==
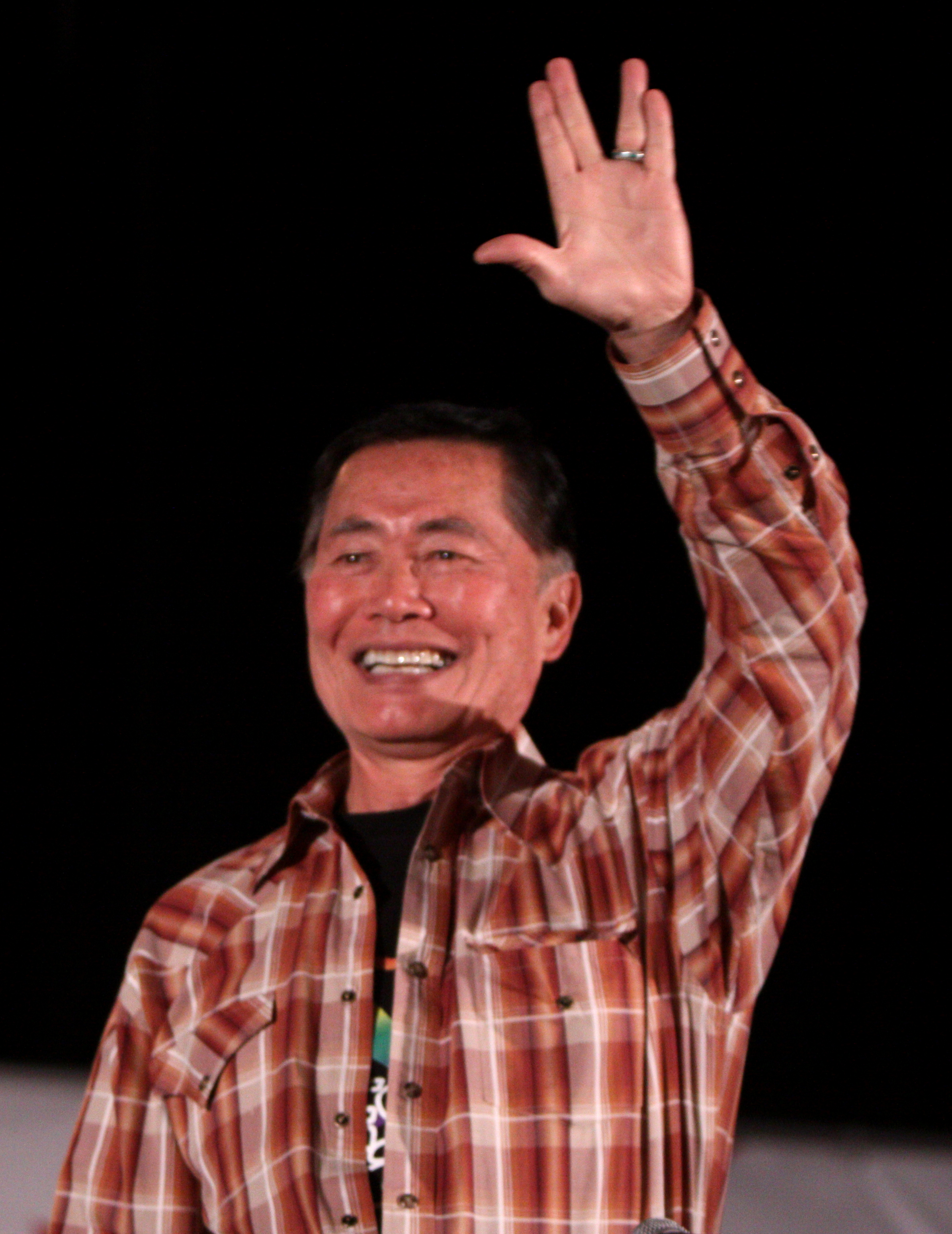
The episode marked the return of George Takei as Ricardio.

"Lady & Peebles" was storyboarded by Rebecca Sugar and Cole Sanchez, from a story by Patrick McHale, Kent Osborne, and Pendleton Ward. It was directed by Larry Leichliter with Adam Muto serving as creative director and Nick Jennings serving as art director. Sugar, the eventual creator of the Cartoon Network series Steven Universe, began working on said program's pilot episode while she was storyboarding this episode.

The episode features the return of the anthropomorphic heart villain Ricardio, played by George Takei, a character that Tom Kenny called "the valentine from Hell". Takei had previously played the role in the season one episode "Ricardio the Heart Guy". In the commentary track for the episode, Sugar explained that she saw Bubblegum as the victim of sexual harassment by Ricardio, and that the only way for her to solve the problem was for her to turn the situation around and somehow overcome Ricardio's chauvinism. In the episode, this was metaphorically depicted by having Bubblegum best him in combat. Sugar reveled in the fact that she got to draw Bubblegum ripping off Ricardio's leg and beating him with, noting that she had been wanting to featuring such a scene in her art since she was in high school. Robert Ryan Cory, a character designer most known for his work on the Nickelodeon series SpongeBob SquarePants, storyboarded the panels featuring Princess Bubblegum stomping on Ricardio and grinding her foot into his face. Because he drew the panels, lead character designer Andy Ristaino also allowed Cory to finalize the character designs for the scene. He later posted them on his official Flickr account.

The episode reveals that Lady Rainicorn is pregnant with Jake's children. This plot point would later be revisited in the fifth season episode "Jake the Dad". In the first draft of the ending, Lady Rainicorn was supposed to break up with Jake because he was causing her to be too stressed. However, the crew decided this was a bad idea, and it was changed to Rainicorn telling Jake that she is pregnant. As with all of Lady's dialogue, it was originally planned for the pregnancy revelation to be in Korean, but the crew felt that such a revelation would be lost on most of the audience.

Several video games inspired elements of the episode. Ricardio's bio-engineered body was based on the finale incarnation of Majora, a character from the eponymous video game The Legend of Zelda: Majora's Mask (2000). The general look of Ricardio's dungeon was inspired by the video games Eternal Darkness: Sanity's Requiem (2002) and the game Amnesia: The Dark Descent (2010). The climactic scene with Ricardio was also supposed to have featured more body imagery; for instance, Ricardio was originally slated to have been seated on a giant hand-throne, and the hole in the Ice King's chest was to have been more graphic.

== Reception ==
"Lady & Peebles" first aired on Cartoon Network on August 8, 2012. The episode was viewed by 2.754 million viewers and scored a 0.5 Nielsen rating in the 18- to 49-year-old demographic. Nielsen ratings are audience measurement systems that determine the audience size and composition of television programming in the United States, which means that the episode was seen by 0.5 percent of all households aged 18 to 49 years old were watching television at the time of the episode's airing. The episode first saw physical release as part of the 2013 Fionna and Cake DVD, which included 16 episodes from the series' second, third, and fourth seasons.

Critical reception to the episode was largely positive. Sava awarded the episode a "B+", and wrote that Ricardio is "always welcome on this series, largely due to Takei's delightful voice work." Furthermore, he praised the way that Takei delivered his lines, noting that "there's a theatrical smarminess to his vocals that is a stark contrast to the Ice King's nasality", and that "Takei always sounds like he's having a great time reading the ridiculous lines that are written for him." Sava also wrote positively of Bubblegum's character, noting that she "dominates this episode" and that the "episode reveals a side of her that we rarely see, and hopefully we'll get more of badass PB in the future."

Richard Whittaker of The Austin Chronicle wrote that the episode is "Princess Bubblegum-centric", which, along with the third season episode "Fionna and Cake", provides the female fans of the show an opportunity to see female characters acting in situations normally reserved for Finn and Jake. The Entertainment Examiner named the episode as one of the "memorable" episodes that appeared on the 2013 DVD release Fionna and Cake. The episode was nominated for an Annie Award for "Storyboarding in an Animated Television/Broadcast Production" at the 40th Annie Awards, although the episode did not win.
