= Expulsion =

Expulsion or expelled may refer to:

== General ==
- Deportation
- Ejection (sports)
- Eviction
- Exile
- Expeller pressing
- Expulsion (education)
- Expulsion from the United States Congress
- Extradition
- Forced migration
- Ostracism
- Persona non grata

== Media ==
- Expelled (film), 2014 teen comedy film
- Expelled: No Intelligence Allowed, 2008 film
- Expulsion (band), Swedish doom/death metal band
- The Expelled, English punk/rock band
- The Expulsion (film), a 1923 silent German film
- "Expelled" (short story), a 1930 short story by John Cheever
- Expelled!, a 2025 video game

== See also ==
- Ejaculation (disambiguation)
- Ejection (disambiguation)
- Evicted (disambiguation)
- Explosion (disambiguation)
