= Tree Trunks (Adventure Time) =

- Adventure Time episode
- Episode no.: Season 1 Episode 4
- Directed by: Larry Leichliter (Note: Director); Patrick McHale (Note: Creative director); Nick Jennings (Note: Art director)
- Written by: Bert Youn; Sean Jimenez
- Story by: Merriwether Williams; Tim McKeon
- Production code: 692-016
- Original air date: April 12, 2010
- Running time: 11 minutes

Episode chronology
← Previous "Prisoners of Love"	Next → "The Enchiridion!"
- Adventure Time season 1

"Tree Trunks" is the fourth episode of the first season of the American animated television series Adventure Time. The episode was written and storyboarded by Bert Youn and Sean Jimenez, from a story by Merriwether Williams and Tim McKeon. It originally aired on Cartoon Network on April 12, 2010. The episode guest stars Polly Lou Livingston as the titular Tree Trunks.

In this episode, Tree Trunks joins Finn and Jake who go on a quest to fulfill her desire of picking a proposed legendary "crystal gem apple" in an evil forest. The three eventually find the tree, and Tree Trunks eats the apple, only to apparently explode and be transported to a crystal dimension.

Tree Trunks was voiced by Polly Lou Livingston, a friend of series creator Pendleton Ward's mother. Ward asked Livingston to appear on his show several years after he last saw her. The original ending called for Tree Trunks to simply explode, but a new ending was amended to explain what happened to her. This served as the genesis for the second season episode "Crystals Have Power". The episode was viewed by 1.847 million viewers and received a 1.2 rating among adults between the ages of 18 and 49. The episode received largely positive reviews from critics, with many commenting on the episode's ending.

== Plot ==
Finn and Jake are invited to the elephant Tree Trunks' house for apple pie. The group begins talking about what they wish they could do if they could achieve anything, and Tree Trunks notes that she wants to pick the rare Crystal Gem Apple, which is located in the Evil Forest. Finn and Jake decide to make her wish come true. When they reach the Evil Forest, they encounter a wall of flesh and try to fight it, but because Tree Trunks is naive, she begins putting stickers on it. After defeating the monster, Tree Trunks walks away, following a skeleton butterfly. She is attacked by sign zombies and begins having a tea party with them, not knowing they want to kill her. Finn and Jake fight off the Sign Zombies and continue their adventure, until they encounter a brain beast. Finn goes to fight it, but Tree Trunks' "adventurer's instincts" tell her to put on makeup and seduce the brain beast with her womanly charms. Jake has to leap in to save Tree Trunks while Finn attacks the monster's magic gem weak spot.

Finn, enraged, tells Tree Trunks that she is putting herself in danger. Dejected and crying, she leaves, only to find the Crystal Gem Apple in the heart of the forest. Unfortunately, a Crystal Guardian appears and begins copying Finn and Jake's actions, blocking every attempt to fight it physically. Finn and Jake realize that they have to fight the Crystal Guardian "Tree Trunks-style" by putting on makeup and tricking the monster into letting Tree Trunks take a bite of the Crystal Gem Apple. She bites the apple, pauses for a second, then explodes, leaving Finn, Jake, and the Crystal Guardian shocked and staring at each other in horror. In a final enigmatic scene, Tree Trunks is seen walking in front of a crystal background laughing happily.

== Production ==
"Tree Trunks" was written and storyboarded by Bert Youn and Sean Jimenez from a story by Merriwether Williams and Tim McKeon, and directed by Larry Leichliter. Although the episode was the fourth aired, it was really the sixteenth produced; this is why Tree Trunks appears in the later season one episode "Evicted!" despite her vanishing at the end of this entry. The episode features the introduction of the titular character, played by Polly Lou Livingston. Livingston was a friend of Pendleton Ward's mother Bettie Ward and knew Pendleton when he was a young child. After having not seen her for eight years, he approached her, asking if she would like to play the voice of a character on Adventure Time. She noted that she "nearly fainted" when asked and was surprised he still remembered her. Bettie claimed it was due to her unforgettable Southern drawl.

Originally, the episode called for Tree Trunks to simply explode. The ending, featuring her walking in a strange crystal dimension, was added after the story board was submitted. Thus, this action was the genesis for the season two sequel "Crystals Have Power", which saw the return of Tree Trunks. The unedited version of the episode, featuring Tree Trunks simply exploding, was featured, however, on the Adventure Time: My Two Favorite People DVD. Episode composer Casey James Basichis used a variety of basses and saws to create the whimsical music featured in the episode. He later called the resulting sound a "folksy massacre". Basichis sought to continue the "fun and experimental spirit" in other episodes that focus on Tree Trunks.

== Reception ==
"Tree Trunks" first aired on Cartoon Network on April 12, 2010. The episode was viewed by 1.847 million viewers and scored a Nielsen rating of 1.2/2. This means it was seen by 1.2 percent of all households and 2 percent of all households watching television at the time of the episode's airing. In addition, 1.242 million kids aged 6–11 watched the episode, which marked an increase in 171 percent from the previous year. The episode first saw physical release as part of the 2011 Adventure Time: My Two Favorite People DVD, which included 12 episodes from the series' first two seasons. It was later re-released as part of the complete first season DVD in July 2012.

Francis Rizzo III of DVD Talk rhetorically asked, "If anyone would like to explain just what the hell happened at the end of 'Tree Trunks' I'm all ears." However, he noted that "If [Adventure Time] was a lesser show, episodes like that could possibly make one walk away shaking your head, but somehow it was simply another quirky bit of personality for a show bursting at the seams with it." A review from the Dayton Examiner wrote that "Tree Trunks makes a hysterical character by just being absurd". They praised the fact that, in the episode, she often says lines "that have vague sexual overtones (some of them failing to even be vague)". The review enjoyed the way the episode was able to convey the message of "following your dreams" in such an absurd way. The review also praised the "priceless" twist ending, calling it "the absolute best moment in the episode and one of [their] personal favorites in the entirety of Adventure Time".
