= Adventure Time season 1 =

Adventure Time
- Season 1
- DVD cover
- Showrunner: Pendleton Ward
- Starring: Jeremy Shada; John DiMaggio
- No. of episodes: 26

Release
- Original network: Cartoon Network
- Original release: April 5 – September 27, 2010

Season chronology
- Next → Season 2

The first season of Adventure Time, an American animated television series created by Pendleton Ward, premiered on Cartoon Network on April 5, 2010, and concluded on September 27, 2010. The series is based on a short produced for Frederator Studios' Nicktoons Network animation incubator series Random! Cartoons. The season follows the adventures of Finn, a human boy, and his best friend and adoptive brother Jake, a dog with magical powers to change shape and size at will. Finn and Jake live in the post-apocalyptic Land of Ooo, where they interact with the other main characters of the show: Princess Bubblegum, The Ice King, Marceline the Vampire Queen, Lumpy Space Princess, and BMO.

After the original short became a viral hit on the internet, Cartoon Network picked it up for a full-length series that previewed on March 11, 2010, and officially premiered on April 5, 2010.

The first episodes of the season, "Slumber Party Panic" and "Trouble in Lumpy Space" were watched by 2.5 million viewers; this marked a dramatic increase in viewers watching Cartoon Network when compared to the previous year. The season ended with the finale "Gut Grinder" on September 27, 2010. Soon after airing, the show began to receive critical acclaim as well as a large fan following. In 2010, the Adventure Time episode "My Two Favorite People" was nominated for a Primetime Emmy Award for Outstanding Short-format Animated Program, although the series did not win. Several compilation DVDs that contained episodes from the season were released after the season finished airing. On July 10, 2012, the full season was released on Region 1 DVD; a Blu-ray edition was released on June 4, 2013.

== Development ==
=== Concept and creation ===
The season follows the adventures of Finn the Human, a human boy, and his best friend Jake, a dog with magical powers to change shape and grow and shrink at will. Finn and Jake live in the post-apocalyptic Land of Ooo, wherein they interact with the other major characters, including: Princess Bubblegum, the Ice King, Marceline the Vampire Queen, Lumpy Space Princess, and BMO. Common storylines revolve around: Finn and Jake discovering strange creatures, rescuing princesses from the Ice King, and battling monsters in order to help others. Various other episodes deal with Finn attempting to understand his attraction towards Bubblegum.

According to series creator Pendleton Ward, the show's style was influenced by his time attending the California Institute of the Arts (CalArts) and his experiences working as a writer and storyboard artist on The Marvelous Misadventures of Flapjack. In an interview with Animation World Network, Ward said he strives to combine the series' subversive humor with "beautiful" moments, using Hayao Miyazaki's film My Neighbor Totoro as inspiration. Ward has also named Home Movies and Dr. Katz, Professional Therapist as influences, largely because both shows are "relaxing" and feature "conversational dialogue that feels natural [and] not over the top [nor] cartoony and shrill". Ward described the show as a "dark comedy"; he said "dark comedies are my favorite, because I love that feeling – being happy and scared at the same time. It's my favorite way to feel – when I'm on the edge of my seat but I'm happy, that sense of conflicting emotions. And there's a lot of that in the show, I think." Executive producer Fred Seibert compared the show's animation style to that of Felix the Cat and various Max Fleischer cartoons, but said that its world is also equally inspired by Dungeons & Dragons and video games. Ward intended for the show's world to have a certain physical logic instead of "cartoony slapstick"; even though magic exists in the story, the show's writers tried to create an internal consistency in how the characters interact with the world.

Although the show is set in a post-apocalyptic setting, according to Ward, the original intention was for the Land of Ooo to simply be "magical". After making the episode "Business Time", in which an iceberg containing the bodies of reanimated business men floats to the surface of a lake, the show suddenly became post-apocalyptic, and Ward noted that the production crew "just ran with it." Ward later described the setting as "candyland on the surface and dark underneath".

=== Production ===
The show began as a single stand-alone animated short titled "Adventure Time", which ran for seven minutes. It aired in January 2007 and again as part of Frederator Studios' Random! Cartoons on December 7, 2008. After its release, the short video became a viral hit on the internet. Frederator Studios then pitched an Adventure Time series to Nicktoons Network, but the network passed on it twice. The studio approached Cartoon Network, which said it would be willing to produce a series if Ward could prove the short could be expanded into a full series while maintaining elements of the original's pilot. Rob Sorcher, the chief content officer at Cartoon Network, was influential in getting the network to take a chance on the show; he recognized the series as "something that felt really indie ... comic book-y [and] really new". Ward quickly rethought the concept of the pilot; he wanted a potential series to be "fully realized", rather than be characterized by the "pre-school vibe" that permeated the original film. Ward's college friends Patrick McHale and Adam Muto helped him produce a rough storyboard that featured Finn and Princess Bubblegum going on a spaghetti-supper date. Cartoon Network was not happy with this story and asked for another. Ward then created a storyboard for the episode "The Enchiridion!", which was his attempt to emulate the style of the original Nicktoons short. Cartoon Network approved the first season in September 2008, and "The Enchiridion!" was the first episode to enter into production.

While many cartoons are based on script pitches to network executives, Cartoon Network allowed Adventure Time to "build their own teams organically" and communication through the use of storyboards and animatics. Rob Sorcher, Cartoon Network's chief content officer at the time, explained that the network allowed this because the company was "dealing with artists who are primarily visual people" and by using storyboards, the writers and artists could learn and grow "by actually doing the work." As such, Ward soon assembled a storyboarding team for the series, which was largely composed of "younger, inexperienced people" who had been found using the Internet. However, Cartoon Network, worrying about the status of the show and the inexperience of its production members, hired three veteran animators who had worked on SpongeBob SquarePants to help guide Ward and his team: Derek Drymon (who served as executive producer for the first season of Adventure Time), Merriwether Williams (who served as head story editors for the show's first and second seasons), and Nick Jennings (who became the series' long-serving art director). Thurop Van Orman, the creator of The Marvelous Misadventures of Flapjack, was also hired on as a supervising producer, providing guidance for the series' first two seasons.

In addition to the 26 episodes created during the first season, several others were commissioned and storyboarded, but not produced. These include the episodes "Brothers in Insomnia" (written and storyboarded by Armen Mirzaian and Luther McLaurin, with revisions by Ako Castuera), "The Glorriors" (written and storyboarded by Joe Horne and Doug TenNapel), and "The Helmet of Thorogon" (outlined by Ward, Muto, McKeon, McHale, and Craig Lewis). "Brothers in Insomnia" had been pitched to the network, although it was later scrapped. "The Glorriors", according to Frederator Vice President Eric Homan, "was a casualty of jumping into production without having had any serious development time." "The Helmet of Thorogon", despite initially being assigned the production number 692-008 (which would eventually be taken by the episode "Freak City"), never made it to the storyboard stage, although several pieces of background art for the episode were designed by Ghostshrimp. The storyboards for "Brothers in Insomnia" and "The Glorriors" and the outline for "The Helmet of Thorogon" were later released on Fred Seibert's official Scribd page. Furthermore, the episode "What Have You Done" was given the production number 27, despite only 26 episodes being ordered. This is because the original sixth episode was scrapped during production, and "What Have You Done" took its place, but was given a different code. Due to this, some sources like The Futon Critic, give it the production number 692-006, whereas Frederator gave it the number 692-027.

All of the season's episodes began as simple two-to-three-page outlines that contained the necessary plot information. These outlines were then handed off to storyboard artists, who would then expand the rough outline into a full storyboard. (Note: Information regarding story development and storyboard artists is taken from the opening credits of the season's twenty-six episodes.) The episodes' design and coloring were done at Cartoon Network Studios in Burbank, California. Animation was handled overseas in South Korea, by Rough Draft Korea and Saerom Animation. J. G. Quintel, who would later go on to create the popular Cartoon Network series Regular Show, co-wrote and boarded the episode "Ocean of Fear" after asking Ward if he wanted any freelance help for Adventure Time. Quintel and Ward had previously worked together on The Marvelous Misadventures of Flapjack.

== Cast ==
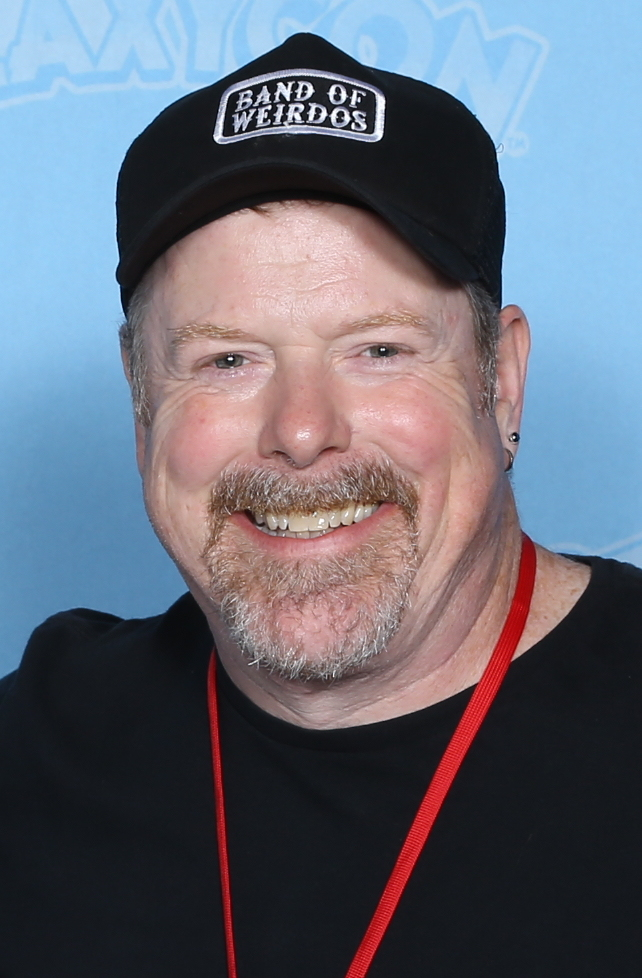
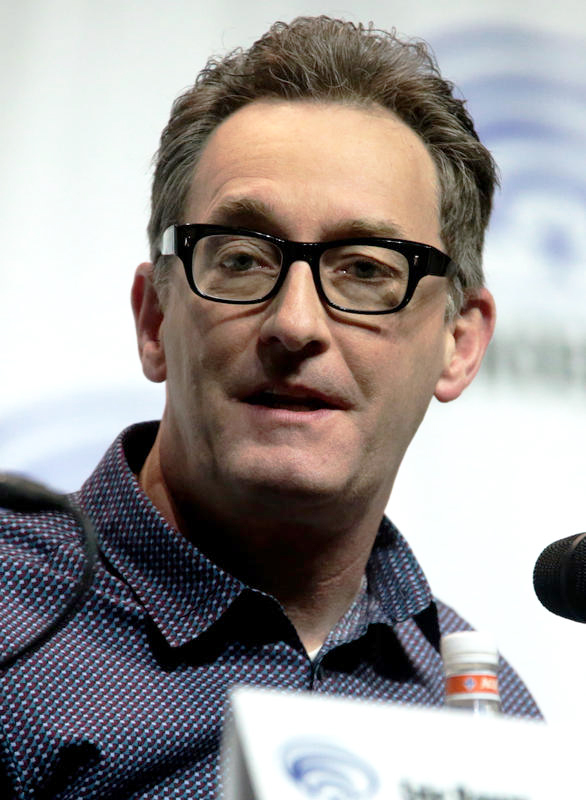
The series employs the voice acting talents of John DiMaggio (left) and Tom Kenny (right) among others.

The voice actors for the season include: Jeremy Shada (Finn the Human), John DiMaggio (Jake the Dog), Tom Kenny (The Ice King), Hynden Walch (Princess Bubblegum), and Olivia Olson (Marceline the Vampire Queen). Ward himself provides the voice for several minor characters, as well as Lumpy Space Princess. Former storyboard artist Niki Yang voices the sentient video game console BMO, as well as Jake's girlfriend Lady Rainicorn in Korean. Polly Lou Livingston, a friend of Pendleton Ward's mother, Bettie Ward, plays the voice of the small elephant Tree Trunks. The Adventure Time cast records their lines together as opposed to doing it individually. This is to capture more natural sounding dialogue among the characters. Hynden Walch has described these group session as akin to "doing a play reading—a really, really out there play."

The series also regularly employs guest voices for various characters. For instance, in the episode "Enchiridion!", John Moschitta, Jr., Mark Hamill, and Fred Tatasciore all lend their voices to various beings. In "Ricardio the Heart Guy", actor George Takei voices the titular villain. "Business Time" features Brian Posehn as one of the business men. Erik Estrada portrays King Worm in the episode "Evicted!" In "Memories of Boom Boom Mountain", Matt L. Jones voices the talking mountain. Andy Milonakis appears as the pie-throwing robot N.E.P.T.R. in the episode "What is Life?" Hamill reappears in the episode "Ocean of Fear", which also features opening and closing narration courtesy of Clancy Brown. Kerri Kenney-Silver portrays the Ice King's bride in the episode "When Wedding Bells Thaw". Michael Dorn portrays Gork in the episode "Freak City". Brown reappears in the episode "Dungeon" as a demon cat. Kevin Michael Richardson portrays the titular character in the episode "Donny". Finally, Lou Ferrigno plays the part of the being Billy in "His Hero".

Various other characters are voiced by Tom Kenny, Dee Bradley Baker, Maria Bamford, and Steve Little.

== Broadcast and reception ==
=== Ratings ===
The episodes "Business Time" and "Evicted!" each were "previewed" on Cartoon Network before the official series launch date, on March 11 and 18, respectively. The series officially premiered on April 5, 2010. It debuted with the episodes "Slumber Party Panic" and "Trouble in Lumpy Space". The episode was watched by 2.5 million viewers. The episode was a ratings smash; according to a press release sent out by Cartoon Network, the episode's timeslot saw triple digit percentage increases from the time period of the previous year. For instance, the entry was viewed by 1.661 million kids aged 2–11, which marked a 110 percent increase from the previous year. Furthermore, it was watched by 837,000 kids aged 9–14, which saw a 239 percent increase. This also made it the most-watched episode of the first season. The season finale, "Gut Grinder", was watched by 1.77 million viewers. Originally, the first ten episodes were bundled into 30-minute airings. This means two of the eleven-minute segments were combined into one. Starting with the eleventh episode, "Wizard", the episodes dropped to only one, eleven-minute segment. The first season aired on Mondays at 8:00 pm.

=== Reviews and accolades ===
The season has received very positive reviews from critics. Television critic Robert Lloyd, in an article for the LA Times, said it "strikes [him] as a kind of companion piece to the network's [then] currently airing Chowder and The Marvelous Misadventures of Flapjack. Each takes place in a fantastical land peopled with strange, somewhat disturbing characters and has at its center a young male person or person-like thing making his way in that world with the help of unusual, not always reliable, mentors." He went on to say that the show is "not unlike CN's earlier Foster's Home for Imaginary Friends, about a boy and his imaginary friend, though darker and stranger and even less connected to the world as we know it." Lloyd also compared it to "the sort of cartoons they made when cartoons themselves were young and delighted in bringing all things to rubbery life."

After its release on DVD in 2012, the season received positive critical attention, although many reviewers initially expressed their unhappiness that the set was not initially released as a Blu-ray edition. Wired wrote positively of the set, and applauded the release's bonus features. R.L. Shaffer of IGN awarded the set a 7 out of 10, denoting a "good" release. He called the show a "rare treat", but was critical of the release's packaging, noting that "a few too many episodes are crammed onto the discs, leaving little room for these transfers to breathe" and that the video compression left something to be desired. Tyler Foster of DVD Talk "highly recommended" the set, and wrote that the series is "bursting with imagination, sweetness, and a ridiculous sense of humor". Foster was particularly pleased with the characters, citing Ricardio and Marceline as highlights of the season. Furthermore, he wrote that "even the worst episode in this [season]—and I'm hard-pressed to pick one—is beautifully designed and packs at least one or two killer gags."

The episode "My Two Favorite People" was nominated for a 2010 Primetime Emmy Award for Outstanding Short-format Animated Program, although the episode did not win.

== Episodes ==
No. overall	No. in season	Title	Directed by	Written and storyboarded by	Original release date	Prod. code	US viewers (millions)
1	1	"Slumber Party Panic"	Larry Leichliter^{d} Patrick McHale^{c}	Adam Muto & Elizabeth Ito	April 5, 2010	692-009	2.50
Finn (voiced by Jeremy Shada) and Princess Bubblegum (voiced by Hynden Walch) must protect the Candy Kingdom from a horde of candy zombies they accidentally created and deal with the consequences of breaking a "royal promise." In the end, the two are able to avert the zombie apocalypse.
2	2	"Trouble in Lumpy Space"	Larry Leichliter^{d} Patrick McHale^{c}	Adam Muto & Elizabeth Ito	April 5, 2010	692-015	2.50
Finn must travel to Lumpy Space to find a cure for Jake (voiced by John DiMaggio), who contracted "The Lumps" from Lumpy Space Princess (voiced by Pendleton Ward) at Princess Bubblegum's marshmallow tea party. In Lumpy Space, Finn and Jake find the antidote, and the two are able to attend the "weekly Promcoming".
3	3	"Prisoners of Love"	Larry Leichliter^{d} Patrick McHale^{c}	Pendleton Ward & Adam Muto	April 12, 2010	692-005	1.85
Having discovered that the Ice King (voiced by Tom Kenny) has captured a number of princesses he sees as potential brides, Finn and Jake team up with the prisoners to set everybody free.
4	4	"Tree Trunks"	Larry Leichliter^{d} Patrick McHale^{c}	Bert Youn & Sean Jimenez	April 12, 2010	692-016	1.85
Tree Trunks (voiced by Polly Lou Livingston) joins Finn and Jake who go on a quest to fulfill her desire of picking a proposed legendary "crystal gem apple" in an evil forest. The three eventually find the tree, and Tree Trunks eats the apple, only to apparently explode and be transported to a crystal dimension.
5	5	"The Enchiridion!"	Larry Leichliter^{d} Patrick McHale^{c}	Pendleton Ward, Adam Muto, & Patrick McHale	April 19, 2010	692-001	2.10
Finn and Jake go on a quest for the titular magical book that would prove them worthy of being righteous heroes. After passing through a series of trials and tribulations, Finn acquires the legendary book.
6	6	"The Jiggler"	Larry Leichliter^{d} Patrick McHale^{c}	Luther McLaurin & Armen Mirzaian	April 19, 2010	692-011	2.10
A strange creature attracted by Finn's auto-tuned singing voice follows the duo to their home and they keep him as a pet. Soon, however, the creature begins to show signs of sickness, and Finn and Jake realize the creature needs the love and attention of its mother. They then return it to its nest.
7	7	"Ricardio the Heart Guy"	Larry Leichliter^{d} Patrick McHale^{c}	Bert Youn & Sean Jimenez	April 26, 2010	692-007	1.91
Finn believes that Princess Bubblegum's new friend, a literal heart named Ricardio (voiced by George Takei), is evil, and is proven right after learning that Ricardio is the heart of the Ice King. Ricardio reveals that he wants to "make out" with Bubblegum's heart, but he is defeated by Finn and Jake.
8	8	"Business Time"	Larry Leichliter^{d} Patrick McHale^{c}	Luther McLaurin & Armen Mirzaian	April 26, 2010 (Note: The episode originally premiered on March 11, 2010 as a sneak peek.)	692-014	1.91
Finn and Jake fall victim to their own laziness when they delegate their adventuring responsibilities to a group of businessmen they thawed from an iceberg. Eventually, the businessmen's efficiency causes them to become hazards to others, and they are refrozen into an iceberg.
9	9	"My Two Favorite People"	Larry Leichliter^{d} Patrick McHale^{c}	Pendleton Ward & Kent Osborne	May 3, 2010	692-004	1.65
Jake feels overwhelmed at not having enough time for Finn and his girlfriend, Lady Rainicorn (voiced by Niki Yang), so he tries to get them to hang out more. Eventually, Finn and Lady Raincorn become closer than Jake is comfortable with, and he starts feeling jealous.
10	10	"Memories of Boom Boom Mountain"	Larry Leichliter^{d} Patrick McHale^{c}	Bert Youn & Sean Jimenez	May 3, 2010	692-010	1.65
Finn, motivated by an upsetting experience when he was a baby, tries to reconfirm his desire for helping people out when confronted with one problem after another stemming from a violence-hating mountain.
11	11	"Wizard"	Larry Leichliter^{d} Patrick McHale^{c}	Bert Youn, Pete Browngardt, & Adam Muto	May 10, 2010	692-020	1.82
Finn and Jake are coaxed by a skeleton man to enroll in a course for free magic powers. After becoming full-fledged wizards, they realize they were tricked into helping stop an asteroid for all of eternity. Finn rejects the status quo and thinks of a different way to avert the crisis.
12	12	"Evicted!"	Larry Leichliter^{d} Patrick McHale^{c}	Bert Youn & Sean Jimenez	May 17, 2010 (Note: The episode originally premiered on March 18, 2010 as a sneak peek.)	692-003	1.88
Finn and Jake search the land of Ooo for a new home after a vampire queen named Marceline (voiced by Olivia Olson) claims the duo's treehouse as her own. Eventually, Marceline relents, because she thinks Finn and Jake are "cool".
13	13	"City of Thieves"	Larry Leichliter^{d} Patrick McHale^{c}	Bert Youn & Sean Jimenez	May 24, 2010	692-012	1.83
When confronted by a Tree Witch over how uncorruptible he is, Finn enters the City of Thieves with Jake to confront a thief who is believed to have stolen a flower basket from a little girl named Penny. However, staying pure of heart within the city proves to be easier said than done.
14	14	"The Witch's Garden"	Larry Leichliter^{d} Patrick McHale^{c}	Kent Osborne, Niki Yang, & Adam Muto	June 7, 2010	692-022	1.81
Jake loses his enthusiasm for adventure when a witch strips him of his powers. After Finn is captured by a skeletal mermaid, Jake attempts to regain his powers; he realizes that he has to apologize to the witch in order to receive his powers, which he does.
15	15	"What Is Life?"	Larry Leichliter^{d} Patrick McHale^{c}	Luther McLaurin & Armen Mirzaian	June 14, 2010	692-017	1.64
Finn builds a Never-Ending Pie-Throwing Robot (N.E.P.T.R., voiced by Andy Milonakis) to pull a prank on Jake, but the machine's conscience is conflicted by the will of the Ice King when he is attacked by a lightning bolt that contained the Ice King's private particles. Eventually, N.E.P.T.R. choose to side with Finn.
16	16	"Ocean of Fear"	Larry Leichliter^{d} Patrick McHale^{c}	J. G. Quintel & Cole Sanchez	June 21, 2010	692-025	2.00
While Finn and Jake are playing by the sea, Finn realizes he is terrified of the ocean. The spectral Fear Feaster (voiced by Mark Hamill) taunts Finn about his fear, and Jake determines to help Finn overcome his fear of the ocean by traveling in it with a submarine.
17	17	"When Wedding Bells Thaw"	Larry Leichliter^{d} Patrick McHale^{c}	Kent Osborne & Niki Yang	June 28, 2010	692-013	1.92
The Ice King suppresses his kidnapping urges to wed a suspicious bride (voiced by Kerri Kenney-Silver) and convinces Finn and Jake to throw him a "manlorette party". Eventually, Finn and Jake realize that the Ice King has placed a curse ring on his bride's finger, and the duo stop the wedding.
18	18	"Dungeon"	Larry Leichliter^{d} Patrick McHale^{c}	Elizabeth Ito & Adam Muto	July 12, 2010	692-023	2.48
Finn's headstrong decision to explore a dungeon "in 11 minutes" in order to find the Crystal Eye causes a rift to form between Finn and Jake. Eventually, the duo reconcile their issues and discover the treasure, but are nearly killed, only to be saved by an irate Princess Bubblegum.
19	19	"The Duke"	Larry Leichliter^{d} Patrick McHale^{c}	Elizabeth Ito & Adam Muto	July 19, 2010	692-019	1.84
Finn turns Princess Bubblegum green and bald, and faces a moral quandary—whether to confess his mistake and be hated by his friend forever, or let Princess Bubblegum wrongly accuse the Duke of Nuts, who has a pudding obsession, instead.
20	20	"Freak City"	Larry Leichliter^{d} Patrick McHale^{c}	Pendleton Ward & Tom Herpich	July 26, 2010	692-008	2.03
After being transformed into a foot by Magic Man (voiced by Kenny), Finn goes to live with a band of misfits. The group realizes that by working together, they can overcome Magic Man. In the end, Magic Man returns Finn and the rest of misfits to his original form.
21	21	"Donny"	Larry Leichliter^{d} Patrick McHale^{c}	Kent Osborne, Niki Yang, & Adam Muto	August 9, 2010	692-018	N/A
Finn and Jake help a grass ogre named Donny (voiced by Kevin Michael Richardson) turn his life around, without realizing the ecological damage they may be causing in the process. After the duo realizes that Donny's obnoxious personality is necessary for nature, they reverse their aid.
22	22	"Henchman"	Larry Leichliter^{d} Patrick McHale^{c}	Luther McLaurin & Cole Sanchez	August 23, 2010	692-021	2.17
Finn takes his place as Marceline's new henchman. Marceline decides to prank Finn by telling him to do tasks that seem evil, but are actually benign. In the end, Marceline and Finn become friends after Finn saves her from a vampire-slaying Jake.
23	23	"Rainy Day Daydream"	Larry Leichliter^{d} Patrick McHale^{c}	Pendleton Ward	September 6, 2010	692-002	2.17
Stuck indoors due to a raining knife storm, Finn discovers that Jake can make his imagination come to life, which starts to cause chaos. The two rush to turn off Jake's imagination, but Finn realizes he must turn his on to achieve their ends.
24	24	"What Have You Done?"	Larry Leichliter^{d} Patrick McHale^{c}	Adam Muto & Elizabeth Ito	September 13, 2010	692-006	1.89
Without giving good details Princess Bubblegum tells Finn and Jake to capture the Ice King as their prisoner, but when they interrogate him they think that he is innocent. After realizing their grave mistake, Finn and Jake right the wrongs they have caused.
25	25	"His Hero"	Larry Leichliter^{d} Patrick McHale^{c}	Kent Osborne, Niki Yang, & Adam Muto	September 20, 2010	692-026	1.83
The great warrior Billy (voiced by Lou Ferrigno) inspires Finn and Jake to practice nonviolence, but the duo finds it difficult to resist old ways. Finn and Jake eventually confront Billy, and manage to successfully explain to him that violence is sometimes necessary.
26	26	"Gut Grinder"	Larry Leichliter^{d} Patrick McHale^{c}	Bert Youn & Ako Castuera	September 27, 2010	692-024	1.77
Finn and Jake pursue a havoc-wreaking "Gut Grinder"—a creature that steals and eats others' gold. Jake begins to suspect he himself might be the culprit. Jake eventually battles and defeats the Gut Grinder, and Finn and Jake are able to return all of the stolen gold.

- ^d Director
- ^c Creative director

== Home media ==
Warner Home Video released multiple DVD volumes, such as My Two Favorite People, It Came from the Nightosphere, Jake vs. Me-Mow, The Suitor, Frost & Fire, and The Enchiridion which contain episodes from the first season. All DVD releases can be purchased on the Cartoon Network Shop, and the individual episodes can be downloaded from both the iTunes Store and Amazon.com.

=== Full season release ===
The full season set was released on DVD on July 10, 2012. By July 29, 2012, the DVD set had sold 151,535 copies. A Blu-ray edition was released on June 4, 2013.

Adventure Time: The Complete First Season
Set details		Special features	
26 episodes; 2-disc set (DVD); 1-disc set (Blu-ray); 1.78:1 aspect ratio; Subtitles: English; English (Dolby Stereo)		Commentary on 4 episodes by the actors, writers, and producers "Trouble in Lumpy Space", "Prisoners of Love", "Ricardio the Heart Guy", and "Tree Trunks"; Animatics for "Slumber Party Panic", "The Enchiridion!", "Dungeon", and "Rainy Day Daydream" Non-optional commentary on all four; "A Behind-the-Scenes Featurette"; "Behind-the-Scenes of the Behind-the-Scenes Featurette"; "'Adventure Time' Music with Casey + Tim" featurette; "A Music video"; "Finndemonium" video; "The Wand" mini-episode	
Release dates
Region 1	Region 4	Region A	Region B
July 10, 2012 (DVD); June 4, 2013 (Blu-ray)	November 17, 2012 (DVD); April 9, 2013 (Blu-ray)	July 10, 2012 (DVD); June 4, 2013 (Blu-ray)	November 17, 2012 (DVD); April 9, 2013 (Blu-ray)
