= The Enchiridion! =

- Adventure Time episode
- Episode no.: Season 1 Episode 5
- Directed by: Larry Leichliter (Note: Director); Patrick McHale (Note: Creative director); Nick Jennings (Note: Art director)
- Written by: Patrick McHale; Adam Muto; Pendleton Ward
- Story by: Patrick McHale; Adam Muto; Pendleton Ward
- Production code: 692-001
- Original air date: April 19, 2010
- Running time: 11 minutes

Guest appearances
- Henry Rollins as Cookie; John Moschitta Jr. as Key-per; Mark Hamill as Dark Magician

Episode chronology
← Previous "Tree Trunks"	Next → "The Jiggler"
- Adventure Time season 1

"The Enchiridion!" is the fifth episode of the first season of the American animated television series Adventure Time. The episode was outlined, written, and storyboarded by Patrick McHale, Adam Muto, and Pendleton Ward. It originally aired on Cartoon Network on April 19, 2010. The episode guest stars Henry Rollins, John Moschitta Jr., and Mark Hamill.

The series follows the adventures of Finn (voiced by Jeremy Shada), a human boy, and his best friend and adoptive brother Jake (voiced by John DiMaggio), a dog with magical powers to change shape and grow and shrink at will. In this episode, Finn and Jake go on a quest for the titular magical book that would prove them worthy of being righteous heroes. After passing through a series of trials and tribulations, Finn acquires the legendary book.

The first episode produced for the series, "The Enchiridion!" was crafted to retain the same spirit as the earlier series' pilot. The middle section originally featured several more trials, but many of them were cut for time. The episode was viewed by 2.096 million viewers, and received generally positive remarks from critics, although several noted that it was noticeably different from the remainder of the series, due to the show's eventual evolution. The episode was later adapted as part of a Level Pack for the 2015 video game Lego Dimensions.

== Plot ==
After a party that results in Finn saving Princess Bubblegum from falling from her tower, she decides that he is worthy of reading the Enchiridion: a tome of heroic knowledge. The book can only be acquired by "for heroes whose hearts are righteous". Bubblegum reveals that the book is located at the top of Mount Cragdor, past several trials.

After passing the doorkeeper, Key-per (voiced by John Moschitta Jr.), Finn and Jake encounter gnomes who cause Finn to doubt himself. When Jake tries to cheer him up, he is eaten by an ogre. Believing his friend to be dead, Finn steals a giant dollar from the ogre and attacks him, hitting him in the groin. The Ogre vomits Jake up, and the two glide to the end of the trials. Finn, however, makes sure to send the dollar back to the Ogre, causing Jake to call his act "righteous".

Once inside the top-most building of Mount Cragdor, a malevolent entity, Dark Magician (voiced by Mark Hamill) takes Finn to his "Brain World", wherein he is first told to slay an evil heart beast, and then slay an "unaligned" ant. Finn kills the beast, but refuses to kill the ant, leading to him defeating the being. Finn is then confronted by Mannish Man, the keeper of the Enchiridion, who gives Finn the book. Finn's first act is to read a chapter about kissing princesses.

== Production ==
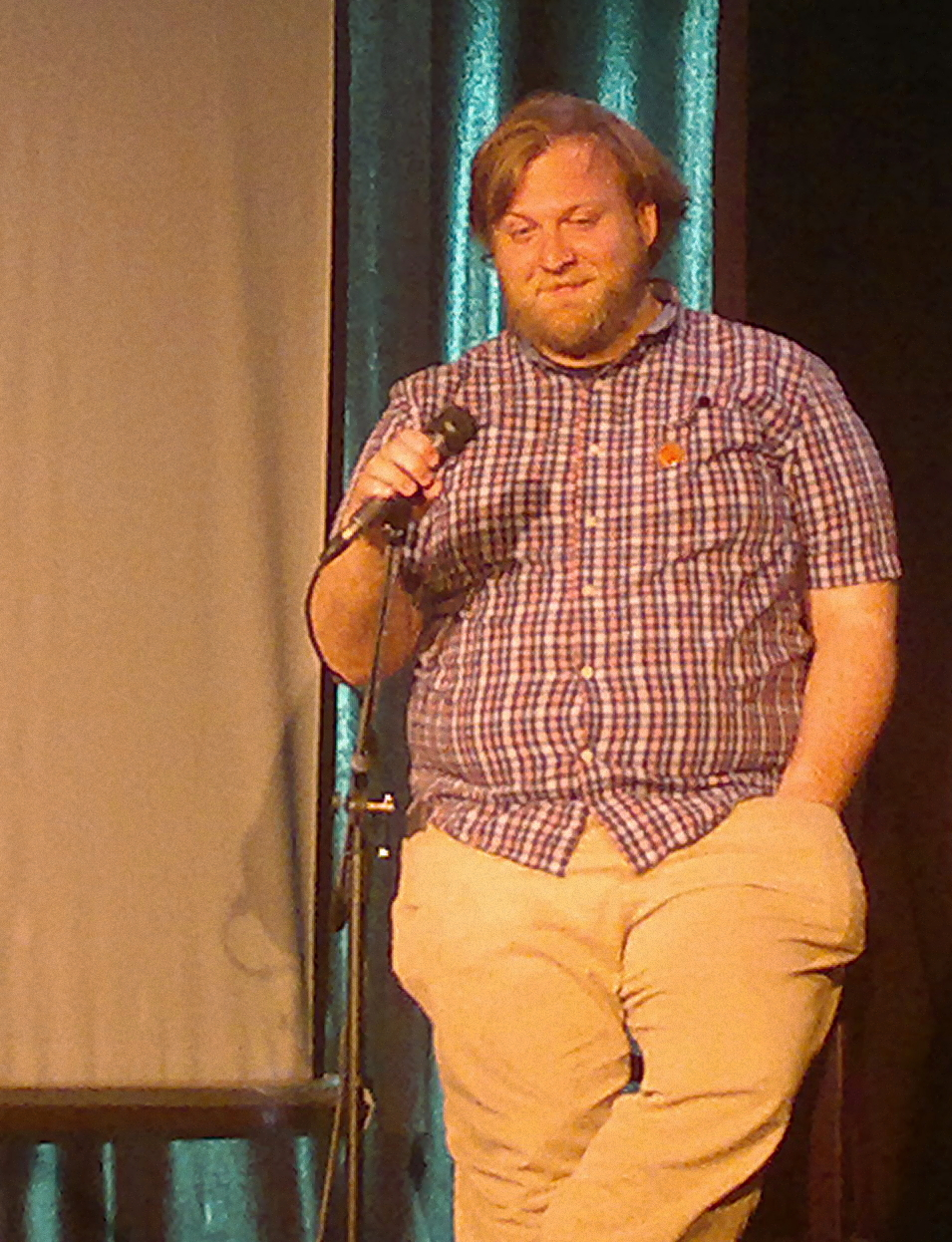
The episode was storyboarded by Pendleton Ward—along with Patrick McHale and Adam Muto—to feel like the original series' pilot.

Despite being the fifth episode to air, "The Enchiridion!" was the first episode of Adventure Time produced for Cartoon Network. Frederator Studios had pitched an Adventure Time series to Nicktoons Network, but the network passed on it twice. The studio then approached Cartoon Network. The network said they would be willing to produce the series if series creator Pendleton Ward could prove that the short could be expanded into a TV series while maintaining elements from the original short. Ward, with help from Patrick McHale and Adam Muto, turned in a rough storyboard that featured Finn the Human and an "oblivious" Princess Bubblegum going on a spaghetti-supper date. However, the network was not happy with this story and asked for another. Ward then created an early storyboard for the episode, "The Enchiridion", which was his attempt to emulate the style of the original short. Cartoon Network approved the first season in September 2008, and "The Enchiridion" became the first episode to enter into production.

Because it was the first episode of the series made, the episode originally was twice as long. During the scene in which Princess Bubblegum tells Finn about the Enchiridion, the original storyboard featured an even longer sequence of Bubblegum detailing the history of Ooo and its heroes. Because it was largely unneeded, it was cut out. The first draft of the storyboard featured Finn encountering twelve trials, which included making friends with a giant bat, dealing with a wizard gnome, and fighting skeletons. Because the episode was too long, these were cut out, and replaced by Finn stealing the giant's dollar. The episode originally was also supposed to have a scene featuring "this little tumor creature dancing behind these red velvet drapes that opened up in a knot in a tree." According to Ward, the red curtains were a deliberate nod to the "Red Room" from David Lynch's famous television drama Twin Peaks. However, the scene was eventually cut. Choose Goose was originally supposed to make his appearance in this episode, offering Finn and Jake some juice. The character was cut for time, but later reappeared in the second season episode "Blood Under the Skin", wherein he became a recurring character.

Henry Rollins voiced the cookie that angrily yells at Finn after he bumps into him. In an early animatic of the episode, Rollins voiced Mannish Man; he later returned to the series to voice the character of Bob Rainicorn in the second season episode "Her Parents". John Moschitta Jr. played the part of Keeper. Ward later recounted that Moschitta's dialogue in the episode was not delivered as fast as Ward wanted. Mannish Man was based on character by Justin Hunt that was originally created for a multi-user dungeon game. Originally, the character was supposed to be the start of a short that Ward and McHale made for CalArts. While it was never finished, a rough version of it was later released on the first season Adventure Time DVD. The sequence taking place in the Evil Guy's "Brain World" was written after executive producer Derek Drymon suggested that the scene could be longer. The heart beast was inspired after Ward saw several instances of Sacred Heart iconography in Mexico.

== Release ==
"The Enchiridion!" first aired on Cartoon Network on April 19, 2010. The episode was watched by 2.096 million viewers, and scored a 1.4/2 percent Nielsen household rating, meaning that it was seen by 1.4 percent of all households and 2 percent of all households watching television at the time of the episode's airing.

The episode first saw physical release as part of the 2012 It Came From the Nightosphere DVD, which included 16 episodes from the series' first three seasons. It was later re-released as part of the complete first season DVD in July 2012.

=== Critical reception ===
However, not all reviews were so complimentary. Tyler Foster of DVD Talk, in a review of the It Came From the Nightosphere DVD, called the episode "primitive" and noted that the episode "has a sense of being locked to a traditional story structure", a structure that he muses later episodes do not have.

In the Ancient Psychic Tandem Warcast podcast, author Lev Grossman and writer Zack Smith reviewed the episode, with the latter calling it a "good, charming little episode with a positive message to it". Grossman called it a good' episode, but noted that it possessed a sort of "cartoon physics" that the series later abandoned; he specifically highlighted the scene wherein Cinnamon Bun did a backflip and destroyed a tower. Ultimately, Smith called it an "interesting homage to Dungeons & Dragons [and] basic mythology".
