= Explosion (disambiguation) =

An explosion is a sudden increase in volume and release of energy in an extreme manner.

Explosion, Explosive, Explode or Exploder may also refer to:

- Explosive material, a substance that can produce an explosion

== Film ==
- Explosion (1923 film), a German silent film
- Explosion (1969 film), an American-Canadian film
- Explosion (1973 film), a Romanian film
- Take Me to the River (2015 film), an American drama film, originally titled Explosion

== Music ==
=== Bands ===
- The Explosion, an American punk rock band formed in 1998
- The Exploders, an Australian alternative rock band formed in 2005
- The Explosives, a backing band for Roky Erickson

=== Albums ===
- Explode (album), by the Unseen, or the title song, 2003
- Explosion! The Sound of Slide Hampton, 1962
- Explosions (Bob James album) or the title instrumental, 1965
- Explosions (Three Days Grace album) or the title song, 2022
- The Explosion (EP), by the Explosion, 2000

=== Songs ===
- "Explode" (Cover Drive song), 2012
- "Explode" (Nelly Furtado song), 2003
- "Explode", by Big Freedia, 2014
- "Explode", by Charli XCX from The Angry Birds Movie soundtrack, 2016
- "Explode", by Damageplan from New Found Power, 2004
- "Exploder", by Audioslave from Audioslave, 2002
- "Explodes", by Kasabian from 48:13, 2014
- "Explosion", by Black Eyed Peas and Anitta, 2019
- "Explosion", by Nicky Byrne from Sunlight, 2016
- "Explosions" (song), by Ellie Goulding, 2013
- "Explosions", by Devo from Oh, No! It's Devo, 1982

== Military ==
- Explosion Museum of Naval Firepower, in Gosport, Hampshire, England, UK
- HMS Explorer (S30), the peroxide submarine nickamed HMS Exploder
- Exploder, a mechanism used to fire the warhead of a torpedo

== Other uses ==
- Explosion, a brand name for methylone
- ex.plode.us, a defunct Internet search engine
- "Explode" (Space Ghost Coast to Coast), an episode of Space Ghost Coast to Coast

== See also ==
- Combinatorial explosion, in mathematics, the effect of functions that grow very rapidly as a result of combinatorial considerations
- Deductive explosion, the phenomenon that logical inconsistency or a provable contradiction may permit to prove everything
- Expulsion (disambiguation)
- Xplosion (disambiguation)
