= Ricardio the Heart Guy =

- Adventure Time episode
- Ricardio plots to cut out Princess Bubblegum's heart. Ricardio is one of the few individuals in the Adventure Time universe to have a highly detailed face, which has been compared to the moon in 1902 silent film Le Voyage dans la Lune.
- Episode no.: Season 1 Episode 7
- Directed by: Larry Leichliter (Note: Director); Patrick McHale (Note: Creative director); Nick Jennings (Note: Art director)
- Written by: Bert Youn; Sean Jimenez
- Story by: Merriwether Williams; Tim McKeon; Adam Muto
- Production code: 692-007
- Original air date: April 26, 2010
- Running time: 11 minutes

Guest appearance
- George Takei as Ricardio

Episode chronology
← Previous "The Jiggler"	Next → "Business Time"
- Adventure Time season 1

"Ricardio the Heart Guy" is the seventh episode of the first season of the American animated television series Adventure Time. The episode was written and storyboarded by Bert Youn and Sean Jimenez, from a story by Merriwether Williams, Tim McKeon and Adam Muto. It originally aired on Cartoon Network on April 26, 2010. The episode guest stars George Takei as the title character, Ricardio.

The series follows the adventures of Finn (voiced by Jeremy Shada), a human boy, and his best friend and adoptive brother Jake (voiced by John DiMaggio), a dog with magical powers to change shape and grow and shrink at will. In this episode, Finn believes that Princess Bubblegum's (voiced by Hynden Walch) new friend, a heart named Ricardio, is evil, and is proven right after learning that Ricardio is the heart of the Ice King (voiced by Tom Kenny). Ricardio reveals that he wants to "make out" with Bubblegum's heart, but he is defeated by Finn and Jake.

Ricardio would become a minor recurring villain, reappearing in the fourth season entry "Lady & Peebles". After the episode aired, series composer Casey James Basichis posted a video explaining his inspiration and the method in which he produced the music featured in the episode. Basichis largely scored the episode with opera music, because he felt the genre suited Ricardio. "Ricardio the Heart Guy" was watched by 1.91 million people and received largely positive critical attention, with many reviews praising Takei's voice work.

== Plot ==
After the Ice King captures Princess Bubblegum, Finn and Jake manage to save her. Bubblegum is so happy that she decides to throw a party for Finn as a thank you. Finn makes a Paper Crane for Bubblegum as a gift, but Jake says that Finn has a crush on her, which Finn denies. When they arrive at the party, however, no one notices them; everyone, including Bubblegum, is too preoccupied with a heart-shaped man named Ricardio. He and Bubblegum begin discussing scientific topics on the dance floor, which leaves Finn feeling jealous.

Finn begins to think that Ricardio is a villain, but Jake just notes that Finn is jealous. However, the two spy on Ricardio to see if he is evil or not. They see Ricardio going into a dumpster and acquiring a rope and broken bottles. Then they see him throwing the Ice King into the dumpster, so they decide to question Ricardio about being a super-villain. Finn punches Ricardio right when Bubblegum comes. Mad and upset, she takes Ricardio away. However, the Ice King soon crawls toward Finn and Jake, looking sickly. He reveals that Ricardio is actually his own heart, which gained sentience after the Ice King performed a failed love spell. Ricardio desires to cut out Bubblegum's heart and make it his bride.

Finn and Jake race to Bubblegum's castle and find her tied to a chair, with Ricardio about to rip her heart out. Finn and Jake then fight Ricardio and manage to beat him up. The Ice King crawls into the castle and places Ricardio back into his chest. Later during dinner, Bubblegum tells Finn that he does not need to be jealous anymore, but Finn denies that he was jealous in the first place.

== Production ==
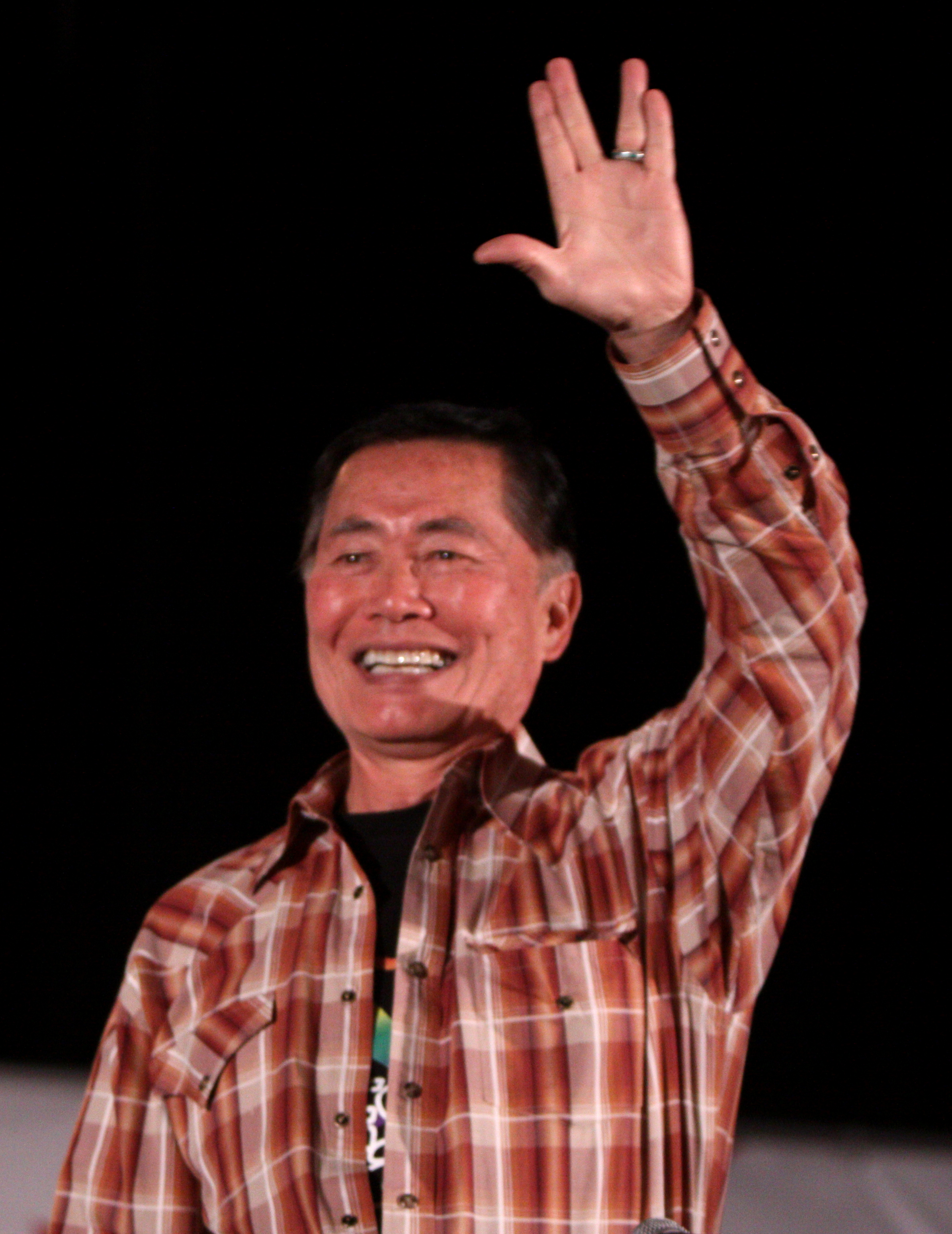
The episode guest stars George Takei.

"Ricardio the Heart Guy" was written and storyboarded by Bert Youn and Sean Jimenez, from a story by Merriwether Williams, Tim McKeon, and Adam Muto. Directed by Larry Leichliter, the episode introduces the recurring villain Ricardio, played by George Takei, a character that Tom Kenny later called "the valentine from Hell". Takei later reprised the role in the season four episode "Lady and Peebles". Initial drafts of the character featured him looking more like an anthropomorphic heart, complete with arteries and ventricles. Ricardio is one of the few individuals in the Adventure Time universe to have a highly detailed face; during the commentary for the episode, his design was compared to that of the face on the moon in the 1902 French silent film Le Voyage dans la Lune, based on H.G. Wells's 1901 novel The First Men in the Moon.

After the episode aired, series composer Casey Basichis posted a video explaining his inspiration and method of producing the music featured in the episode. According to the video, Basichis created a "skeleton" of the score in his shower using his voice and a ukulele; the audio was captured on a phone. Originally, the score was going to have a "New York City, taxi, and jazz" feel, but Basichis was unhappy with the genre choice, and changed the feel. For the music that played while the Ice King interacted with Ricardio, Basichis was inspired by the score from the original seven-minute short. In addition, opera singer Karen Vuong lent her voice to the episode. According to Basichis, Vuong was able to record her vocals successfully in one take. Basichis chose opera because he knew it had a reputation for being "sickeningly intellectual" and "preoccupied with murder", traits that he felt suited Ricardio.

== Reception ==
"Ricardio the Heart Guy" first aired on Cartoon Network on April 26, 2010. The episode was watched by 1.91 million viewers, and scored a 1.3/2 percent Nielsen household rating, meaning that it was seen by 1.3 percent of all households and 2 percent of all households watching television at the time of the episode's airing. The episode first saw physical release as part of the 2011 Adventure Time: My Two Favorite People DVD, which included 12 episodes from the series' first two seasons. It was later re-released as part of the complete first season DVD in July 2012; commentary for the episode was also included on the DVD.

The episode garnered mostly positive reviews from critics. Matt Fowler of IGN, in a review of the My Two Favorite People DVD, noted that while "the idea of a walking, talking heart named Ricardio […] who plans to cut out Princess Bubblegum's heart is potent nightmare fuel", the show nevertheless "finds a way to make that grim idea accessible and fun."

Takei's appearance as Ricardio gained critical favor. Charlie Anders of io9 named Takei's appearance in the episode as one of his "greatest moments", noting, "how could we have missed that Takei did the voice for this sleazy science-talking heart on Adventure Time, our new favorite show?" Tyler Foster of DVD Talk called Ricardio one of the highlights of the season. The A.V. Club reviewer Oliver Sava, in a review for "Lady & Peebles", wrote that Ricardio is "always welcome on this series, largely due to Takei's delightful voice work." Furthermore, he praised the way that Takei delivered his lines, noting that "there's a theatrical smarminess to his vocals that is a stark contrast to the Ice King's nasality", and that "Takei always sounds like he's having a great time reading the ridiculous lines that are written for him."
