= Evicted! =

- Adventure Time episode
- Marceline meets Finn and Jake for the first time. The artistic design for Marceline was created by series creator Pendleton Ward, with small changes and additions added by Phil Rynda, former lead character designer and prop designer for the show.
- Episode no.: Season 1 Episode 12
- Directed by: Larry Leichliter (Note: Director); Patrick McHale (Note: Creative director); Nick Jennings (Note: Art director)
- Written by: Bert Youn; Sean Jimenez
- Story by: Adam Muto
- Production code: 692-003
- Original air dates: March 18, 2010 (preview); May 17, 2010 (official)
- Running time: 11 minutes

Guest appearance
- Erik Estrada as King Worm

Episode chronology
← Previous "Wizard"	Next → "City of Thieves"
- Adventure Time season 1

"Evicted!" is the twelfth episode of the first season of the American animated television series Adventure Time. The episode was written and storyboarded by Bert Youn and Sean Jimenez, from a story by Adam Muto. It originally aired on Cartoon Network on March 18, 2010, as a preview for the series; it later officially aired that same year on May 17. The episode guest stars Erik Estrada as King Worm. The episode marks the first appearance of Marceline the Vampire Queen (voiced by Olivia Olson), who would go on to play a larger role in the series as a friend and companion to Finn and Jake.

The series follows the adventures of Finn (voiced by Jeremy Shada), a human boy, and his best friend and adoptive brother Jake (voiced by John DiMaggio), a dog with magical powers to change shape and grow and shrink at will. In this episode, Finn and Jake search the land of Ooo for a new home after Marceline claims the duo's treehouse as her own. Finn and Jake search all of Ooo for a new home, before settling temporarily in a cave. After a final confrontation, Marceline relents and gives Finn and Jake their house back because she finds them entertaining.

The character of Marceline was present in the series' pitch bible, but she had not yet appeared in an episode prior to "Evicted!". Olson was cast as the character after she initially read for the part of Princess Bubblegum; she was later pleased with her casting, praising Marceline's varied design. "Evicted!" also features the first song that was produced for the series: "The House Hunting Song". "Evicted!" was watched by 1.88 million people and received largely positive critical attention, with Cam Shea of IGN naming the episode the fourth best episode of Adventure Time's first season, and Oliver Sava of The A.V. Club noting that the episode is an example of the emotional complexity of the series. "Evicted!" also drastically increased Marceline's popularity with fans of the series.

== Plot ==
During a rainy night, Jake tells Finn a story about a supposed vampire who used to live in their tree fort. Finn, scared by the sounds outside the house, goes downstairs to talk to Jake. Suddenly, their window is blown open and the lights go out. Finn and Jake soon discover that Marceline the Vampire Queen has sneaked into their house. Both Finn and Jake are terrified that Marceline will kill them and drink their blood, but she reveals that she has no intentions of killing them, noting that she really only eats the color red. However, she explains that the tree house used to belong to her, and she promptly evicts them from their residence.

Finn and Jake then attempt to find new homes. After a string of failures, they soon stumble upon a cozy cave. They clean it up and throw a house-warming party, which Marceline crashes. She explains that the cave also belongs to her. Finn, having had enough, starts a fight with Marceline, who grows into a huge demonic bat. After she seemingly kills Jake, Finn goes into a rage and violently punches Marceline, who promptly shape-shifts into her regular form and then kisses Finn on the cheek, making him blush. Jake—who it is revealed used his shape-shifting powers to save himself—runs over to Finn, and Marceline states that the fight they had was fun. As a token of goodwill, she gives them their old house back. Once Finn and Jake return to the tree fort, they are promptly hypnotized by King Worm.

== Production ==
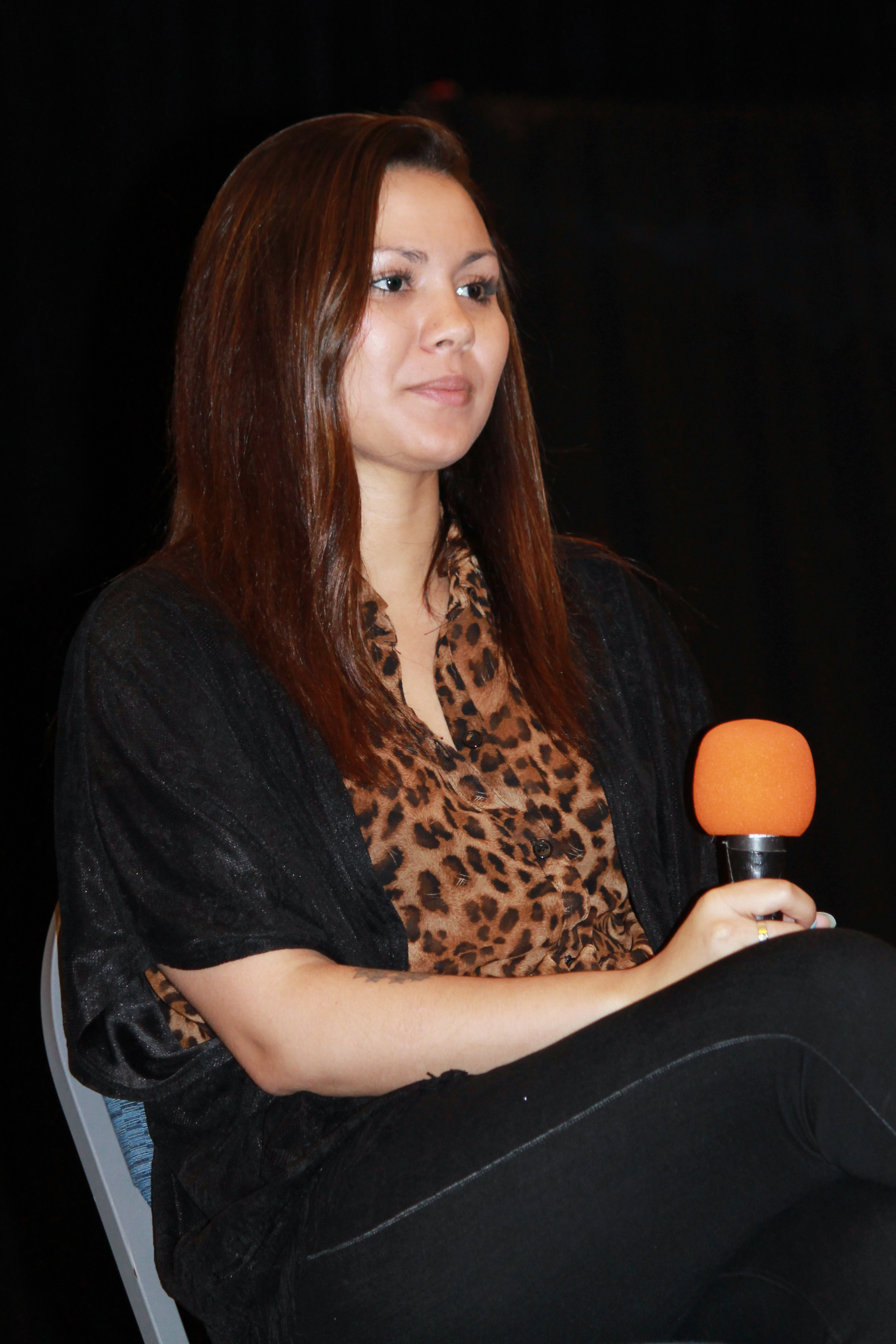
Marceline the Vampire Queen is voiced by Olivia Olson.

"Evicted!" was written and storyboarded by Bert Youn and Sean Jimenez, from a story developed by Adam Muto. The episode was directed by Larry Leichliter, with Pat McHale serving as creative director and Nick Jennings serving as art director. The storyboard for the episode is substantially different from the finished episode. Major changes include the dialogue between Finn and Jake near the beginning being longer, and the "House Hunting Song" being absent from the script. Other changed scene include Finn and Jake's encounter with the Ice King (in the original version, Finn and Jake huddle in a group of penguins, which incites the Ice King's anger), the manner in which Finn and Jake discover the cave (Finn and Jake fall through the top and are nearly impaled by stalagmites), as well as the ending (which originally featured Jake and Finn dealing with a werewolf).

The aforementioned "House Hunting Song" was the first musical piece produced for Adventure Time (with the exception of the theme song). The song—which was originally called "Oh Marceline"—was sung by Ward and Olivia Olson. The lyrics were written by Ward, who recorded a rough demo of the song a cappella. Patrick McHale later re-recorded the song with guitar, and Ward then recorded both a different, "high intensity" version and a more subdued variant. When the crew was deciding which version to use, Ward wanted to use McHale's recording, but Derek Drymon urged Ward to use his own. McHale later posted his demo for the song through his official Twitter account. In a 2016 Tumblr post, McHale explained:

When I was working on Season 1 of Adventure Time (2009? 2008?) we had to write a montage song for the episode "Evicted!" while Finn and Jake are looking for a new house. Pen wrote a bunch of lyrics, so I brought them home and fine tuned them and put them to music. I recorded a demo that was too long, so I just digitally sped it up to be the right length (which is the recording above). [The song] was supposed to sound sort of... lame... like sort of… like a lame singer songwriter guy who's into Dave Matthews but isn't nearly as talented. That was, like, a thing in the early 2000s… a lot of people played this certain acoustic guitar style, but I don't know the name for it. Maybe it has tinges of what was called "Emo"? Or… what does Hoobastank sound like? Uhh, I don't know. Who cares. I'm old now and I don't remember anything. [...] In the end I didn't want to sing the final version, so Pen did the singing in the show. He did more of a Blink 182 style thing. Blink 182? Is that right?

Ashley Dzerigian played all of the bass in the episode. According to series composer Casey James Basichis, she is "classically trained as a bassist and can do just about anything". Ryan Conner recorded guitar feedback that Basichis later autotuned into melodies.

The episode marks the first appearance of Marceline the Vampire Queen, one of the main characters in Adventure Time. Although she did not appear in the series' pilot, the groundwork for her design and character were present in the series pitch book, penned by Pendleton Ward. Ward purposely set out to make Marceline's character complex, as he explained in an interview that "with the female characters it's easy to either write them as clichés or write them as the extreme opposite of those clichés […] I just try to make them have faults and strengths just like Finn and Jake have."

Marceline is voiced by Olivia Olson; she had originally auditioned for the role of Princess Bubblegum. After her initial audition, she was asked to read for the role of Marcelline, and was "definitely impressed by the character" after seeing design drawings. Olson is also the character's singing voice. The artistic design for Marceline was created by Ward, with small changes and additions added by Phil Rynda, former lead character designer and prop designer for Adventure Time. Olson later related in an interview that she was impressed by her character because, "she has really cool style […] I love what they come up with [in] every episode." The episode also features the vocal talents of actor Erik Estrada as King Worm; Estrada would reprise the role for the eponymous fourth season episode "King Worm".

== Reception ==
"Evicted!" was previewed on Cartoon Network on March 18, 2010. The episode officially aired on May 17, 2010. the episode was watched by 1.88 viewers, and scored a 1.2/2 percent Nielsen household rating. Nielsen ratings are audience measurement systems that determine the audience size and composition of television programming in the United States, which means that the episode was seen by 1.2 percent of all households and 2 percent of all households watching television at the time of the episode's airing.

Critical reception to "Evicted!" was largely positive. Cam Shea of IGN named Marceline's introduction in "Evicted!" as the fourth best moment in the series' first season. He wrote that "sure, in this episode she evicts Finn and Jake from their home ... but hey, this is the first time we meet her and she's awesome." He later wrote that "Marceline = best". Marceline has gone on to be one of the most popular characters with the Adventure Time fan base, and after the release of "Evicted!" her popularity grew enormously. Ward later noted that he felt "good about that. It's nice". Oliver Sava of The A.V. Club named the episode one of the ten additional installments of the series that illustrates that "emotional complexity" lies "beneath Adventure Time's weirdness".

In the Ancient Psychic Tandem Warcast podcast, Zack Smith and the Supernatural writer and producer Jenny Klein reviewed the episode, both of whom expressed an appreciation for Marceline as well as her voice actress. Klein compared the relationship between Marceline and Finn in this episode to the interactions between Kim Kelly (Busy Philipps) and Sam Weir (John Francis Daley), characters from the short-lived sitcom Freaks and Geeks. Klein also commended the "House Hunting Song", applauding the fact that it was sung by Pendleton Ward and arguing that it was an example of the creator speaking directly to the audience. She likened this experience to listening to an audiobook read by the author.

== Media release ==
The episode first saw physical release as part of the 2011 Adventure Time: My Two Favorite People DVD, which included 12 episodes from the series' first two seasons. It was later re-released as part of the complete first season DVD in July 2012. In addition, the 2015 limited edition 12" vinyl record release Marceline the Vampire Queen – Rock the Nightosphere included "The House Hunting Song" alongside other songs sung by Marceline.
