= Xplosion =

Xplosion may refer to:

== Music ==
- Xplosión, a 1993 album by Vico C
- The Xplosions!, a band signed to Highland Records

=== Songs ===
- "Xplosión", a 1993 song by Vico C, the title track off the eponymous album Xplosión
- "Xplosion", a song by OutKast from their 2000 album Stankonia

== Sports ==
- TNA Xplosion, Total Nonstop Action Wrestling TV show, formerly "Impact Xplosion"
- K-1 Challenge 2005 Xplosion X, a 2005 kickboxing event in Gold Coast, Australia

=== Teams ===
- Atlanta Xplosion, Atlanta, Georgia, USA; a women's American football team
- Colorado Xplosion, Denver, Colorado, USA; a women's basketball team
- Iowa Xplosion, Des Moines, Iowa, USA; a women's American football team
- Kalamazoo Xplosion, Kalamazoo, Michigan, USA; an indoor American football team
- Pittsburgh Xplosion, Pittsburgh, Pennsylvania, USA; a basketball team
- Three Rivers Xplosion, South Side, Pittsburgh, Pennsylvania, USA; a women's American football team

== Other uses ==
- Xplosion, an action figure collection for Marvel HeroClix

== See also ==
- Explosion (disambiguation)
