= Evicted (disambiguation) =

Evicted may refer to eviction, the removal of a tenant from rental property.

Evicted may also refer to:

- "Evicted (Flight of the Conchords)", the 2009 series finale episode of the comedy TV show, Flight of the Conchords
- "Evicted!" (2010), season 1 episode 12 of the animated TV series, Adventure Time
- Evicted: Poverty and Profit in the American City (2016), a nonfiction book about housing evictions in Milwaukee, Wisconsin
