= Ejaculation (disambiguation) =

In males, ejaculation is the ejection of semen.

Ejaculation may also refer to:

- Ejaculatory prayer, a very short emotional prayer
- Female ejaculation
- Interjection, a short utterance
- "Ejaculation" (Big Mouth), a 2017 television episode

== See also ==
- Exclamation (disambiguation)
- Facial (sex act), a man ejaculating semen onto face(s)
