= My Two Favorite People =

- Adventure Time episode
- Episode no.: Season 1 Episode 9
- Directed by: Larry Leichliter (Note: Director); Patrick McHale (Note: Creative director); Nick Jennings (Note: Art director)
- Written by: Kent Osborne; Pendleton Ward
- Story by: Merriwether Williams; Tim McKeon
- Production code: 692-004
- Original air date: May 3, 2010
- Running time: 11 minutes

Guest appearance
- Vincenzo Rauso as Tiffany

Episode chronology
← Previous "Business Time"	Next → "Memories of Boom Boom Mountain"
- Adventure Time season 1

"My Two Favorite People" is the ninth episode of the first season of the American animated television series Adventure Time. The episode was written and storyboarded by Kent Osborne and series creator Pendleton Ward, from a story by Merriwether Williams and Tim McKeon. It originally aired on Cartoon Network on May 3, 2010. The episode guest stars Vincenzo Rauso as Tiffany.

The series follows the adventures of Finn (voiced by Jeremy Shada), a human boy, and his best friend and adoptive brother Jake (voiced by John DiMaggio), a dog with magical powers to change shape and grow and shrink at will. In this episode, Jake feels overwhelmed at not having enough time for Finn and his girlfriend, Lady Rainicorn (voiced by Niki Yang), so he tries to get them to hang out more. Eventually, Finn and Lady Raincorn become closer than Jake is comfortable with, and he starts feeling jealous.

== Plot ==
Jake is frustrated that he does not have enough time to hang out with both Finn and his girlfriend, Lady Rainicorn (voiced by Niki Yang), so he tries to get them to hang out more. At first, this attempt to get Finn and Lady to bond is hampered by Finn being unable to speak Lady Rainicorn's language, Korean. However, Jake remembers and secures a universal translator from the bottom of a lake, the two are able to converse easily and soon develop a friendly relationship.

Eventually, Finn and Lady Raincorn become closer than Jake is comfortable with, and he starts feeling jealous. To make Finn and Lady feel jealous, Jake calls his old friend Tiffany (voiced by Vincenzo Rauso) and asks him to play viola with him. Finn and Lady confront Jake and Tiffany, and after an altercation, Jake realizes he was in the wrong. Jake then makes up with Finn and Lady, and he gets rid of the universal translator.

== Production ==
"My Two Favorite People" was written and storyboarded by series creator Pendleton Ward and Kent Osborne, from a story developed by Merriwether Williams and Tim McKeon. The entry was directed by Larry Leichliter. Ward made sure that the ending "turn[ed] the moral on its head", by adding the line "No man, let's always be stupid… forever!" Ward explained, "I just cringe when there's a serious moral to be learned at the end of a story. I'll always turn the moral on its head if the episode needs something like that at the end of it." Niki Yang, the voice of Lady Rainicorn, appreciated the story, noting that "It's not really 'cracking up, back-to-back jokes,' but it's just a sincere story, going into the characters and their issues and friendship."

== Reception ==
"My Two Favorite People" first aired on Cartoon Network on May 3, 2010. The episode was watched by 1.65 million viewers, and scored a 1.1/2 percent Nielsen household rating, meaning that it was seen by 1.2 percent of all households and 2 percent of all households watching television at the time of the episode's airing. The episode first saw physical release as part of the eponymous 2011 DVD, Adventure Time: My Two Favorite People, which included 12 episodes from the series' first two seasons. It was later re-released as part of the complete first season DVD in July 2012.

Critically, the episode was well-received. It was later nominated for a 2010 Emmy Award for Short-format Animation, although the episode did not win.

The DVD release that the episode lent its namesake to was mostly well-received by critics, although several reviewers were slightly displeased at the apparent randomness of the episodes included. Francis Rizzo III of DVD Talk complimented the release, calling it a "short random assortment, presented in good quality" that "is fun to watch and might satisfy younger fans". However, he noted that, because full season collections were on their way, "you may want to [rent it] for now." Matt Fowler of IGN awarded it a 7 out of 10 rating, denoting a "good" release. He was complimentary towards the manner in which the episodes were presented, but felt that the releases extras—simple character information slides—were "of little interest to anyone". Ultimately, Fowler concluded that "this DVD is still a great way to introduce Adventure Time to those who haven't seen it and haven't yet experienced the shared joy".
