= Exclamation =

Exclamation may refer to:

- Exclamation mark, the punctuation mark "!"
- Exclamation, an emphatic interjection
- Exclamation, a type of sentence
- Exclamation, a statement against penal interest in criminal law in United States
- Exclamation, a fragrance by Coty
