= Ex.plode.us =

Former internet search engine

ex.plode.us
- Website type: Search engine
- Available in: English
- Owner: Curverider Ltd
- Website: ex.plode.us
- Commercial: yes
- Launched: 2007
- Current status: inactive

ex.plode.us was a website search engine that indexed people. It was created by Curverider, the creators of the Elgg social networking platform. Ex.plode.us aggregated social data from 43 Things, flickr, jaiku, Live Journal, tribe.net, Twitter, and YouTube.

Initially launched as Explode! in February 2007 as purely a social network aggregation utility and widget it was re-launched in May 2007 as a people search engine.

In August 2007 a Facebook version was released, taking advantage of the recently opened Facebook API. However, the Facebook application did not allow ex.plode.us to aggregate information from Facebook.

In February 2008 a discussion on tribe.net dominated by tribe users who voiced privacy concerns resulted in tribe.net blocking ex.plode.us from accessing tribe users' FOAF data. Individuals who were users of both ex.plode.us and tribe.net lost a great deal of their network on ex.plode.us.

As of February 2010, ex.plode.us no longer exists.

It had hacked into some YouTube users accounts to get the 'sign up name' to display with the 'user name'. Google still has searches related to this hacking.

== API ==
The site offered a REST-style API, which no longer exists.
