= Ice King =

Fictional character from Adventure Time

- Adventure Time character
- First appearance: Adventure Time (2007)
- Created by: Pendleton Ward
- Voiced by: Tom Kenny; John Kassir (pilot)

In-universe information
- Full name: Simon Petrikov
- Nickname: Ice King
- Species: Human
- Gender: Male
- Significant other: Betty Grof (ex-fiancée)
- Children: Marceline the Vampire Queen (adoptive daughter)

Simon Petrikov, more commonly called the Ice King, is a fictional character in the Adventure Time franchise. He was first introduced in the American animated television series Adventure Time. The character was the main antagonist of the show's early seasons and develops into a main character in later seasons. He is also a main character in the adult animated spin-off series Adventure Time: Fionna and Cake.

Originally introduced as an evil but incompetent wizard obsessed with kidnapping princesses, he was depicted in later seasons of Adventure Time as a lonely man driven insane by a magical crown which grants him ice powers. The show's third season reveals that he was once an ordinary human named Simon Petrikov before falling under the influence of the crown. Simon regains his sanity and memories after being stripped of his powers by the being Golb in the series finale "Come Along with Me." Adventure Time: Fionna and Cake depicts Simon's difficulty adjusting to life after these events.

Although the character initially garnered a lukewarm reception from critics, his later backstory and character development into a tragic figure were widely acclaimed. The crown's influence over Ice King came to be seen as a complex depiction of social isolation and mental illness, notably Alzheimer's and bipolar disorder. The episodes "I Remember You" and "Simon & Marcy", focusing on the Ice King's paternal relationship with Marceline the Vampire Queen, are often considered two of the show's best.

== Creation and design ==
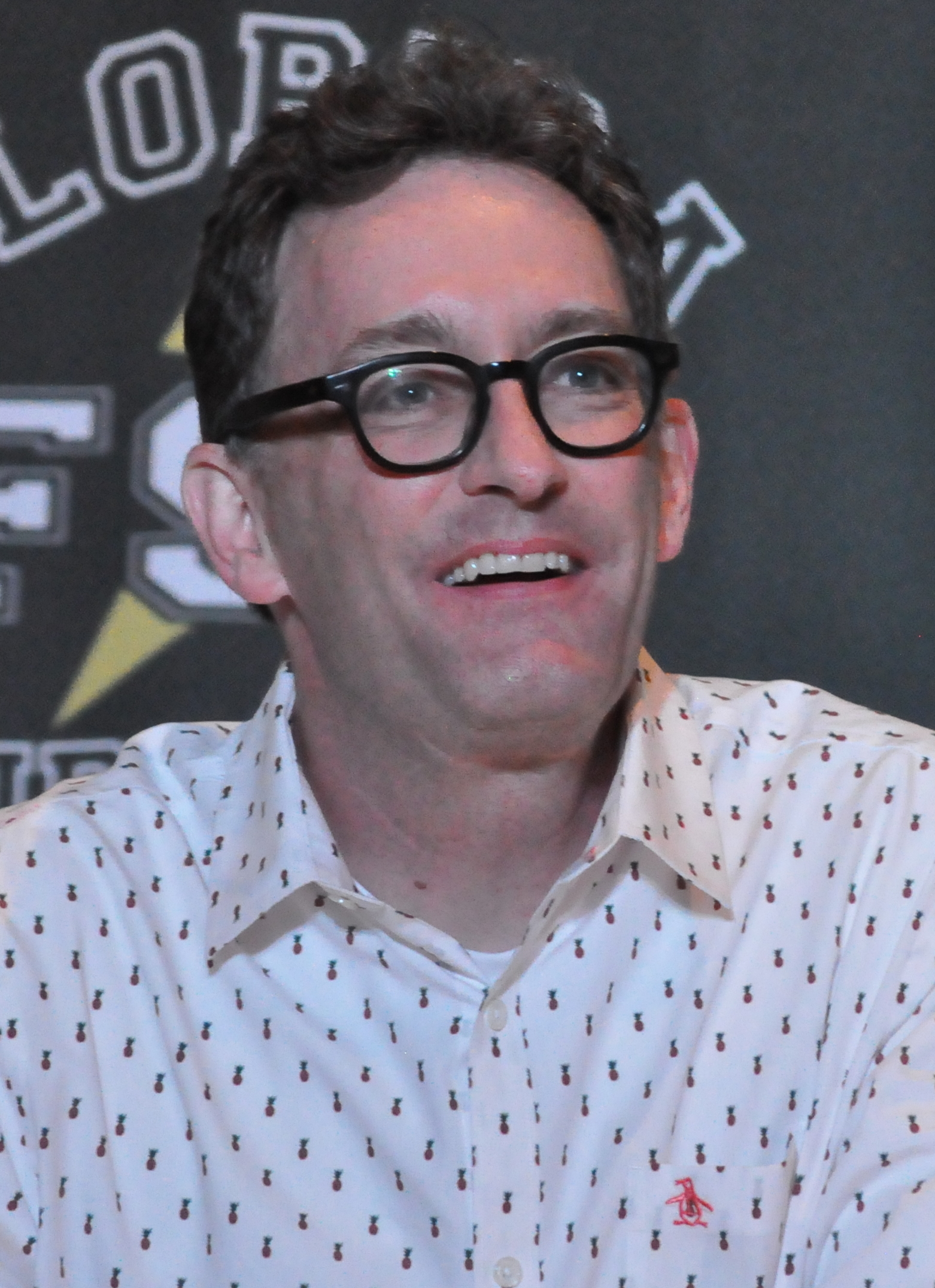
Ice King is voiced by Tom Kenny (2015)

The character was first voiced by the American actor John Kassir in the short film "Adventure Time", which introduced the character. In the short, the protagonists Finn the Human (Jeremy Shada) and Jake the Dog (John DiMaggio) fight Ice King to rescue Princess Bubblegum (Paige Moss), whom he has kidnapped. He is voiced by the American actor Tom Kenny in the television series of the same name. Kenny said that he approached the character as "a very real psychopath" who did not fully understand why his actions were wrong.

Pendleton Ward, the creator of Adventure Time, considered Ice King to be a "pathetic" character. Commenting on the character's sympathetic backstory, he said that he "enjoy[s] a villain that you fall in love with."

The journalist Neil Strauss of Rolling Stone noted that the character bore some similarities to Ward, including his "Trotsky glasses", his large beard and his strong desire for social interaction. Strauss said that "If the Ice King is Ward's dark side, then Finn, the show's 16-year-old protagonist, is his light side."

== Appearances ==
=== Adventure Time (2010–2018) ===
Ice King, a wizard capable of creating and manipulating snow and ice, was introduced as an antagonist of the series' main characters Finn (Jeremy Shada) and Jake (DiMaggio). A recurring plot point throughout the series is his attempts to kidnap princesses and force them to marry him, which are repeatedly foiled by Finn and Jake. Ice King rules over the Ice Kingdom, which is located in the land of Ooo where the series takes place and inhabited by penguins. About a thousand years before the start of the series, the Earth was ravaged by the Mushroom War, a nuclear conflict that mutated life and created the magical setting of Ooo.

The Ice King's heart escapes his body in "Ricardio the Heart Guy", the seventh episode of the first season, and takes on anthropomorphic features. The heart, named Ricardio (George Takei), attempts to seduce Princess Bubblegum (Hynden Walch). A weakened Ice King warns Finn and Jake of Ricardio's origins and evil nature. After they defeat him, Ice King puts Ricardio back in his body and is restored to health. Ricardio escapes from Ice King's body again in "Lady & Peebles", the 19th episode of the fourth season. Ricardio fashions a body out of Ice King's flesh, believing that it will make him more attractive to Princess Bubblegum who rejects and defeats him in single combat.

Simon Petrikov

The third season two-part special "Holly Jolly Secrets" revealed that the Ice King was once an antiquarian named Simon Petrikov, who purchased a magical crown from a dockworker in Scandinavia. Simon soon discovered that wearing the crown was gradually turning his skin blue and making him act erratically. Simon's fiancée Betty Grof (Lena Dunham) left him as a result of the crown's influence over him. The crown's magic allowed him to survive the apocalyptic Mushroom War.

In episode 25 of season four, "I Remember You", it is revealed that Simon met Marceline the Vampire Queen (Olivia Olson) when she was a young orphan, and helped her survive the fallout of the Mushroom War. Realizing that his mental health was rapidly degenerating, he wrote a letter to Marceline apologizing for anything he might do when he no longer remembers her. Despite not remembering their past, Ice King continually seeks out Marceline to be near her. The relationship between Ice King and Marceline is further explored in "Simon & Marcy", the 14th episode of the fifth season, which reveals that he reluctantly began wearing the crown so that he could use its power to protect Marceline, despite knowing that this was causing him to lose his mind. Simon left Marceline out of fear that the crown would eventually make him hurt her.

Ice King's powers are taken by Bella Noche, an anti-magic creature, in "Betty" the 48th episode of the fifth season. Freed from the magical influence of the crown, Ice King regains the memories of his identity as Simon but begins to die without the crown to keep him alive. With the help of Marceline, he creates a time portal so he can apologize to Betty, who jumps through the portal intent on saving him. Betty defeats Bella Noche, causing Simon to become the Ice King once more. Betty appears to die in an explosion, but secretly survives and begins looking for ways to free Simon from the crown. She absorbs the powers of Magic Man in episode 38 of season six "You Forgot Your Floaties", intending to use these powers to try to cure Simon.

In "Elemental", the 8th episode of season eight, Ice King accidentally frees the Patience St. Pim (Lauren Lapkus), an ancient Ice Elemental who existed before the Mushroom War. Patience is defeated in the miniseries "Elements", which aired as part of Adventure Time season nine. Betty (Felicia Day) returns in the miniseries and unsuccessfully attempts to cure Ice King's insanity with magic. When this fails, Betty tries to alter the past to stop Simon from finding the crown and prevent the Mushroom War from taking place. Ice King stops Betty from changing the timeline, which would erase many of Ooo's inhabitants from existence.

Betty makes another attempt to restore Simon's mind in the series finale "Come Along with Me" by harnessing the power of the evil deity GOLB. They are both swallowed by GOLB, along with Finn. Inside of GOLB, Simon is stripped of his powers and freed from the crown's curse. Betty then uses the crown to transform GOLB into a less destructive deity by merging with it, sacrificing herself in the process to become Golbetty. Afterwards, Ice King's penguin Gunter absorbs the crown and becomes the Ice Thing.

=== Adventure Time: Fionna and Cake (2023) ===
Simon Petrikov is a major character in the series Adventure Time: Fionna and Cake, which features gender flipped versions of characters from Adventure Time. The titular characters in Fionna and Cake were first introduced in the ninth episode of Adventure Time's third season, "Fionna and Cake", which revolved around gender-flipped fan fiction written by Ice King. In Adventure Time: Fionna and Cake, Simon struggles to deal with the loss of Betty and to adjust to life in the magical world of Ooo now that he no longer has magical powers. Additionally, he is uncomfortable with the popularity of his fanfiction, which he created while under the crown's influence. He attempts to summon Betty, who is still merged with GOLB after the events of "Come Along With Me", but accidentally summons Fionna and Cake instead, who are revealed to exist in an alternate universe.

Simon travels with them across the multiverse in an attempt to fix Fionna and Cake's universe, by using the power of the ice crown. Once he obtains it, Golbetty intervenes to prevent him from wearing it and falling under its curse again. Simon tells her that he doesn't feel worthy of the second chance at life that she gave him, but she tells him that she does not regret anything that happened before saying goodbye and returning him to Ooo.

=== Other ===
Ice King had a cameo appearance in Adventure Time: Distant Lands, a limited series based on Adventure Time.

He is the antagonist of the videogames Adventure Time: Hey Ice King! Why'd You Steal Our Garbage?!! (2012), and Adventure Time: Explore the Dungeon Because I Don't Know! (2013). The comic book miniseries Adventure Time: Ice King was published by Boom! Studios in 2016. Ice King was also a main character in the 2019 comic book miniseries Marcy & Simon.

== Characterization ==
Ice King appears like an elderly man with blue skin, which is caused by the magical crown he wears. Wearing the crown grants him immortality, as well as the ability to control snow and ice. Although evil, Ice King has been described as "incompetent" and "ineffectual". Throughout the show, Ice King is prone to misanthropy and depressive episodes, and he expresses anxiety over his body image. Despite wanting to live a normal life, Ice King's awkward and harmful behaviors drive away friends and potential romantic partners.

It is later revealed that wearing the crown drove him insane, and caused him to lose all memories of his past life as a kind man named Simon Petrikov. Simon's personality at times surfaces, but is generally repressed by the personality of the Ice King. Film critic Liz Baessler of Film School Rejects noted that, because of the amnesia and personality changes caused by the crown, Simon and Ice King could be considered "two unique consciousnesses in one body."

The character's amnesia and mental health issues have been described as a metaphor for Alzheimer's disease and senility. His mental and emotional instability has also been interpreted as a representation of bipolar disorder by some critics. Simon's mental health is not completely restored after he is freed from the crown's curse at the end of the series, instead he continues to deal with the effects of his life experience.

Novelist Lev Grossman, in an interview with NPR, praised the backstory of the Ice King and the exploration of his condition, noting that his origin is "psychologically plausible."

=== Relationships ===
Simon was engaged to Betty Grof, who left him after the crown began to affect his mental health. The loss of Betty, whom he nicknamed "his princess," led to the Ice King's obsession with kidnapping princesses. Despite this breakup, Simon and Betty have an enduring bond that film critic Eric Kohn of IndieWire described as "[stretching] across boundaries of space and time." Later in the series, she time travels to the future, intent on curing him of his insanity and restoring Simon. She becomes fixated on restoring Simon to the way she remembered him, despite Ice King's desire to remain the way he is. After Betty sacrifices her physical being to cure Simon and defeat GOLB by merging with it and becoming Golbetty, he struggles to move on but eventually does. Throughout their relationship, Betty often placed Simon's needs ahead of her own, something which Simon only realizes after Golbetty reminds him of it. Bones Jacques of Campus Times described the relationship between Simon and Betty in Adventure Time and Fionna and Cake as "a love story of uneven sacrifice, obsession, and loss."

Ice King has a complicated relationship with Marceline the Vampire Queen, whom he found in the wreckage of the Mushroom War when she was seven years old. He became a father figure to Marceline, protecting her from mutants and gifting her the stuffed animal Hambo, which became her most prized possession. Kohn compared the relationship between Ice King and Marceline in the flash-back episodes to the Man and Boy in Cormac McCarthy's post-apocalyptic novel The Road. This similarity was also acknowledged by the creative team of Adventure Time, who described the episode "Simon & Marcy" as "The Road for kids" when pitching it to Cartoon Network.

After learning of his past from Marceline, Finn and Jake become kinder to Ice King and start inviting him to social events. Ice King in turn gradually became less evil as those around him became understanding of his struggles. His relationship with Princess Bubblegum also becomes less antagonistic, despite his repeated attempts to kidnap her in the beginning of the series. Ice King is accompanied by Gunter, a penguin who acts as his friend and servant. It is later revealed that Gunter is Orgalorg, a powerful being that attempted to destroy the world in the past and was turned into a harmless penguin.

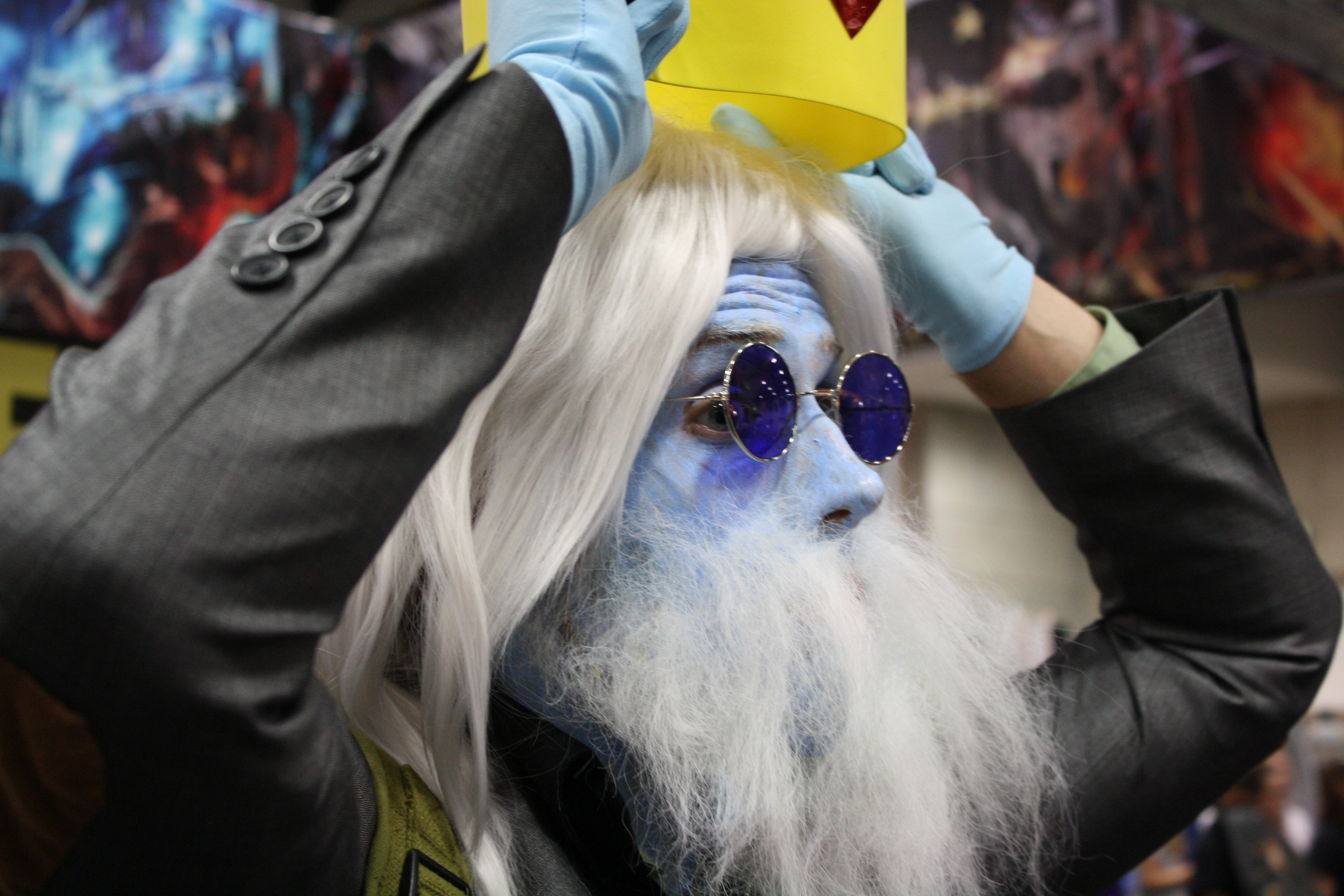
Simon Petrikov cosplay at San Diego Comic-Con 2014

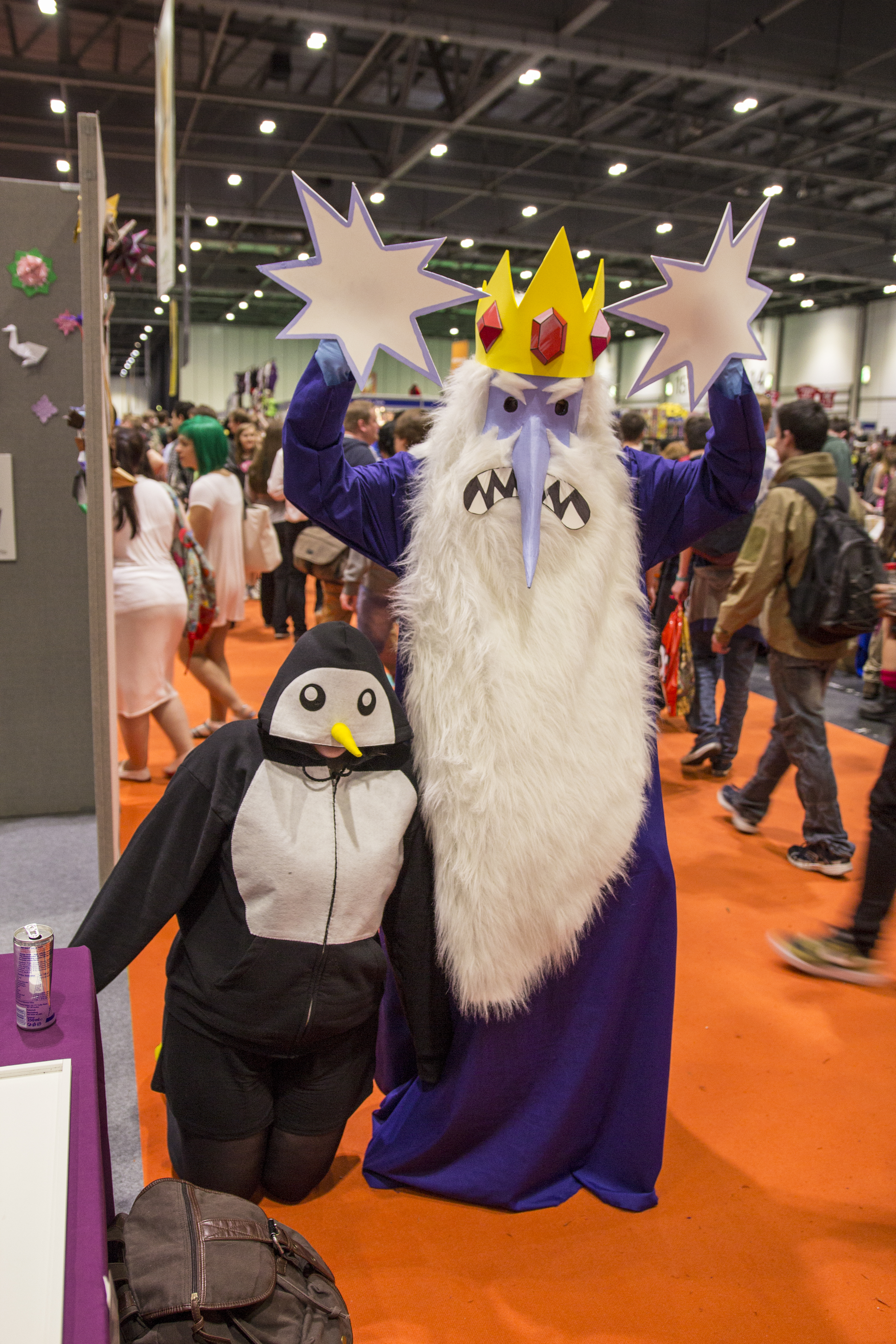
Ice King and Gunter cosplay at London Comic Con May 2015

== Reception ==
=== Adventure Time ===
The character originally earned a mixed reception, with some critics considering him to be a one-dimensional villain. The journalist Oliver Sava of The A.V. Club described his character in the Adventure Time's early seasons as "a princess-stealing villain in the Gargamel mold." However, Ice King's characterization was considered to improve from the show's third season onwards, as his backstory established him as a more complex character experiencing mental illness and social isolation. TV.com stated, "it's sort of amazing how Adventure Time has transformed the Ice King from an irritating antagonist to one of the most tragic figures on television."

The fourth-season episode "I Remember You", which focuses on the Ice King's relationship with Marceline, is considered a turning point in the show's portrayal of Ice King. Novelist Charlie Jane Anders, writing for io9, called the episode "one of the most intense things I've seen in ages". Film critic Dan Persons of Tor.com ranked it #3 on his list of "Ten Heartbreakingly Brilliant Works of Animation." The episode "Simon & Marcy" also received praise, and was nominated for a Primetime Emmy at the 65th Primetime Emmy Awards. Both episodes were included on Geek.com's list of the show's best 10 episodes.

The journalist Juliet Kleber of The New Republic also praised the character's arc, saying that:

The series' first antagonist, the Ice King, is revealed to have once been a human scientist, turned mad by the magic crown he used to protect a young Marceline in the ruins of human civilization. It was a moving character arc revealed over many seasons, woven deftly into the series mythology, turning one of the show's most outlandish characters into a complex, tragic figure.

In a retrospective review of the series, the journalist Eric Thurm of Vulture called the Ice King "Adventure Time's Best Character" and opined that the character's appeal came from his complex flaws. He felt that Ice King embodied both intense struggles such as Alzheimer's and more mundane issues like social awkwardness, making him relatable to a wide audience.

=== Fionna and Cake ===
The portrayal of Simon Petrikov in Fionna and Cake was generally well received by critics, as was Kenny's voice performance. Rendy Jones of Den of Geek praised the emotional complexity and depth of Simon's story arc, highlighting the animation and storyboarding decisions, and describing the role as Kenny's "most harrowing and soulful performance yet."

Some critics described the relationship between Simon Petrikov and his fictional creations as a metacommentary on the relationship between the Adventure Time franchise and its creators, specifically showrunner Adam Muto. Reuben Baron of Paste summarized Simon's internal conflict regarding his writing as the "dilemma of moving on from a creative project that brings others joy but reminds him of personal pain".

== See also ==
- List of Adventure Time characters
