= Adventure Time (2007 TV film) =

- Pen has an inspirational talk with Abraham Lincoln on Mars. Cartoon Network, who later turned the short into a series, enjoyed the short's atypical humor, highlighting this scene in particular.
- Written by: Pendleton Ward
- Directed by: Larry Leichliter; Hugo Morales; Pendleton Ward

Production
- Running time: 7 minutes

Original release
- Network: Nicktoons
- Release: January 11, 2007

Adventure Time is an animated short film created by Pendleton Ward which first aired on Nicktoons on January 11, 2007. The film follows the adventures of Pen (Zack Shada), a human boy, and his best friend Jake (John DiMaggio), a dog with magical powers to change shape and grow and shrink at will. In the film, Pen and Jake have to rescue Princess Bubblegum (Paige Moss) from the antagonistic Ice King (John Kassir).

Adventure Time was later shown in Fred Seibert's Random! Cartoons series showcase on December 7, 2008, subsequently leading to the creation of the animated Cartoon Network series of the same name. It was nominated for an Annie Award for Best Animated Short Subject.

== Plot ==
The film focuses on a boy named Pen (later renamed Finn in the television series) and his best friend, a shapeshifting dog named Jake. One day, Lady Rainicorn, a unicorn-like creature, flies past them in tears; Pen and Jake follow her to an icy domain, where they discover that the Ice King has kidnapped Lady Rainicorn's owner, Princess Bubblegum, in the hope of marrying her. Declaring that it's "Adventure Time", Pen and Jake set off to the Ice King's mountain lair, fighting an "iceclops" and other large monsters in the process. In the Ice King's lair, Pen and the Ice King fight while Jake ignores the battle to flirt with Lady Rainicorn. Just when Pen seems to be gaining the upper hand, the Ice King uses his powers to freeze Pen in a block of ice. Pen sees himself transported back in time, and to Mars, where he has a short motivational conversation with Abraham Lincoln, who encourages Pen to believe in himself. Pen's mind returns to the present and he breaks out of the ice just as the Ice King flies away with Princess Bubblegum. Chasing after him using Jake's extendable legs, Pen rescues the princess from the Ice King's grasp. Jake pushes the magical crown off the Ice King's head, removing his powers. The Ice King then plummets off screen, vowing to exact revenge. Princess Bubblegum thanks Pen by giving him a kiss, to Pen's delight and embarrassment. As he sheepishly leads Jake away, Pen spots some nearby ninjas stealing an old man's diamonds, and the two bid farewell to Princess Bubblegum as they run off towards their next adventure.

== Characters ==
- Pen (Zack Shada) – An enthusiastic twelve-year-old boy with a strong sense of justice, and one of the two main protagonists of the short. According to Ward, he is "a little boy" who is "just hanging out". For the television series, he was renamed to Finn; the character would also go on to be voiced by Zack's younger brother Jeremy Shada.
- Jake (John DiMaggio) – Pen's best friend and brother, an anthropomorphic dog with shapeshifting abilities and the other protagonist of the short. Jake is Pen's "pal", according to Ward. DiMaggio would voice the character in both the short and the later series.
- Princess Bubblegum (Paige Moss) – The damsel in distress of the short who is kidnapped by the Ice King so he can marry her. The short served as Moss' final role before her retirement from acting, Bubblegum would later be voiced by Hynden Walch in the series.
- Rainicorn (Dee Bradley Baker) – A unicorn-like creature with rainbow fur who serves as Princess Bubblegum's steed. Throughout the short, she helps Pen and Jake save her owner from the Ice King. Rainicorn would later be renamed "Lady Rainicorn" for the series, and would be voiced by Korean storyboard artist Niki Yang, rather than Dee Bradley Baker.
- Ice King (John Kassir) – A powerful wizard who lives in an icy domain, serving as the main antagonist of the short; Ward later called him a "nutbar" in an interview. Kassir voiced the character in the short, but Tom Kenny would later voice the Ice King in the series.

== Production ==
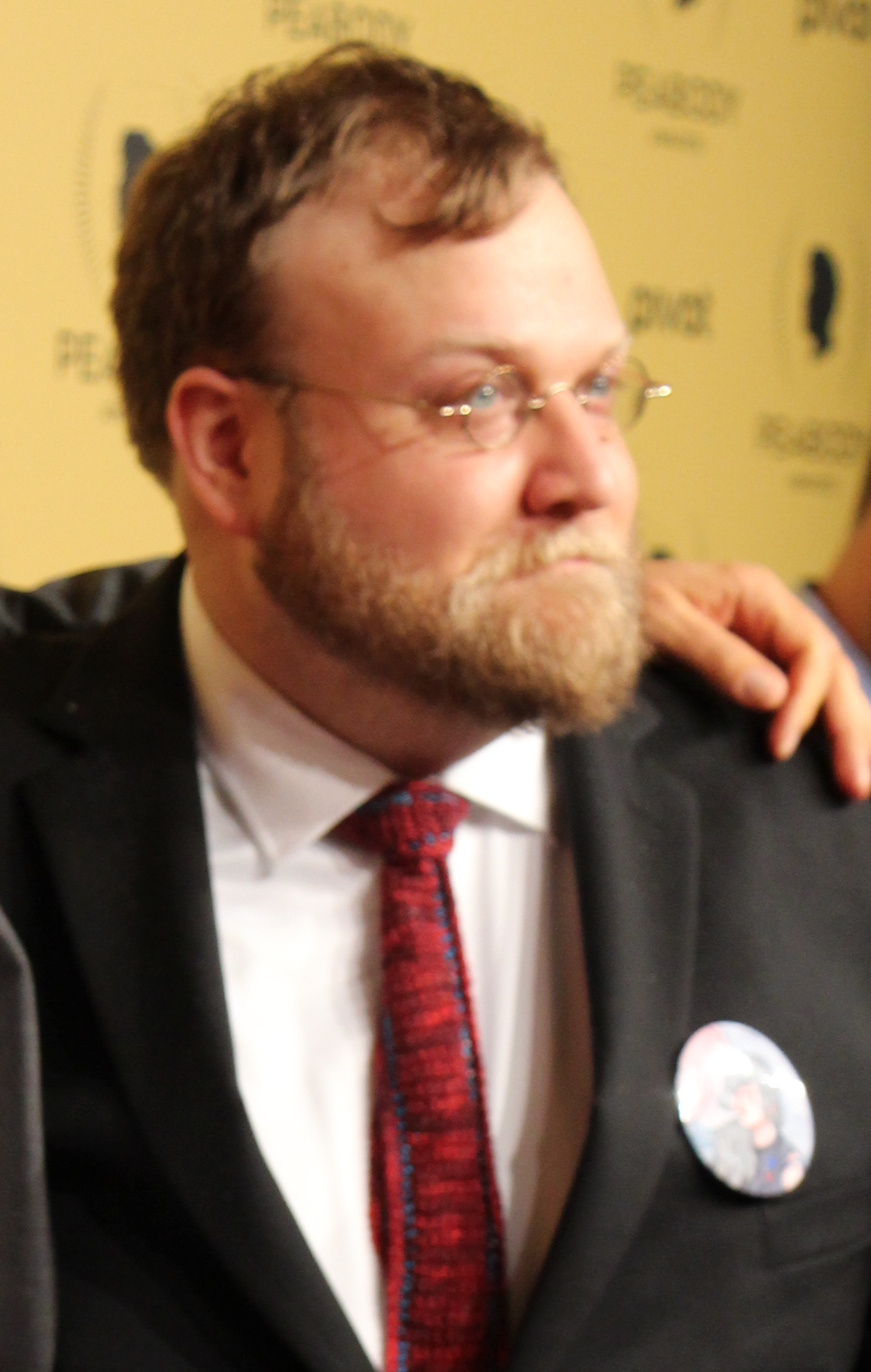
The short was created by Pendleton Ward.

Adventure Time was created by Pendleton Ward. The short's style was influenced by his time at California Institute of the Arts (CalArts). Adventure Time was Ward's first job in animation after he graduated from CalArts. Ward had been contacted by Eric Homan, the vice president of Development at Frederator Studios, after Homan saw one of Ward's films at a CalArts animation screening called The Producer's Show. Homan told Ward that he should consider pitching an idea to Frederator. Ward spent around two weeks storyboarding the outline for Adventure Time, a process that he later called "exciting" because he was "jumping into it not knowing whether [he] would sink or swim."

During the initial storyboard pitch to Frederator Studios, Ward brought a guitar and played the episode's theme song. Frederator's CEO Fred Seibert was initially disinclined to make the short, feeling it was too much of a "student film" and without much commercial appeal. Longtime colleagues, development executive Homan and production executive Kevin Kolde convinced him otherwise, arguing that Seibert had actually laughed in the presentation, something that he did not often do. Frederator approved the pitch, and Adventure Time soon went into production.

Ward hired several of his recently graduated CalArts friends to work on the short with him. Neil Graf was tasked with coloring, Julian Narino was the background designer, and Adam Muto drew the props. Graf and Narino later got jobs with other series and studios—King of the Hill and Laika, respectively—but Muto continued working with Ward and eventually became Adventure Time's co-executive producer and showrunner. The finished short ran for seven minutes, and production wrapped up in the spring of 2006.

== Release and reception ==
Adventure Time first aired as a stand-alone 7-minute short on Nicktoons on January 11, 2007. It later aired as part of Frederator Studios' Random! Cartoons on December 7, 2008. In between airings, it leaked onto the internet and went viral. According to Frederator Studios producer and founder Fred Seibert the short, "between all of its distribution points," had been viewed almost 3,000,000 times by April 2008. The feature was later nominated for an Annie Award for Best Animated Short Subject, although it did not win.

After its release and success, Frederator Studios then pitched an Adventure Time series to Nickelodeon, but the network passed on it twice. The studio then approached Cartoon Network. The network said they would be willing to produce the series if Ward could prove that "the seven-minute short made for Nick wasn't a one-hit wonder". Ward quickly retooled the concept of the pilot; he wanted a potential series to be "fully realized", rather than feature the "pre-school vibe" that he believed defined the original pilot. Initially, Ward submitted a rough storyboard that featured Finn and an "oblivious" Princess Bubblegum going on a spaghetti-supper date. However, the network was not happy with this story, and specifically asked for an episode that contained the same things that had "made the short so special, like the crazy opening dance, the 'Abe Lincoln moment,' funny catchwords, and the awkward princess/kiss moment at the end." Ward then created an early storyboard for the episode "The Enchiridion!", which was his attempt to emulate the style of the original short. Eventually, Cartoon Network approved the first season in September 2008, and "The Enchiridion!" became the first episode to enter into production.
