= Polly Lou Livingston =

American voice actor (1929–2021)

- Born: Polly Lou Simon; May 6, 1929; Victoria, Texas, U.S.
- Died: January 24, 2021 (aged 91); Victoria, Texas, U.S.
- Occupation: Voice actress
- Years active: 1945–2021
- Spouse: Robert Livingston
- Children: 2

Polly Lou Livingston (née Simon; May 6, 1929 – January 24, 2021) was an American voice actress known for her role as Tree Trunks in the Cartoon Network animated series Adventure Time.

== Early life and education ==
Polly Lou Livingston grew up in a tight-knit Jewish community.

The family business, M.O. Simon Company, was a department store where she developed her personal style. She often traveled with her father to New York on business trips.

Livingston's paternal grandfather came to the U.S. from Russia during the Jewish persecution under the Czar. They immigrated through Ellis island, where their surname was changed from "Spitalny" to "Simon."

Livingston attended Stephens College in Columbia, Missouri.

== Career ==
Livingston was known for her sense of fashion and dress. Her love of fashion developed early, and she was involved in the family's department store. She was a buyer for the store, and met many famous designers on her trips to New York. She also worked in San Antonio as a personal shopper for Frost Brothers.

Her wedding dress was designed by Claire McCardell and is part of the permanent fashion collection at the University of Texas, where Livingston donated her clothing.

Livingston was well known for Polly Lou's Party's; "A visual whirlwind of theatrical whimsy with every detail perfectly executed."

In 2008, Pendleton Ward, a fellow San Antonio native and a close family friend, cast Livingston to play Tree Trunks on the Cartoon Network animated series Adventure Time, which premiered on April 5, 2010.

In 2014, the San Antonio Current awarded her "Best Dressed Woman" and lauded her unique sense of style.

Livingston sat on the Dean’s Council of Fine Arts at the University of Texas as well as the Gala Committee for UT’s Center for the Performing Arts.

== Marriage and children ==
She married Robert "Bobby" Livingston in the 1950's, and had two children, Carol and Ben.

== Death ==
Livingston died of natural causes on January 24, 2021, at her home, surrounded by loved ones. She rests in the Evergreen Jewish Cemetery in Victoria, Texas.
