= Princess Bubblegum =

Princess Bubblegum (Bonnibel Bubblegum)
- Adventure Time character
- First appearance: Adventure Time (2007)
- Created by: Pendleton Ward
- Voiced by: Hynden Walch (series); Paige Moss (pilot); Isabella Acres (young in "Mortal Recoil", "Too Young", and Elements); Livvy Stubenrauch (young in "Bonnibel Bubblegum")

In-universe information
- Full name: Bonnibel Bubblegum
- Nicknames: "PB", "Peebs", "P-Bubs", "Bonnie", "Bon-bon"
- Species: Gum Golem (Candy Elemental)
- Gender: Female
- Title: Princess of the Candy Kingdom
- Occupation: Monarch of the Candy Kingdom; Life scientist
- Family: Mother Gum (parent); Neddy (brother); Gumbald (mechanical uncle); Lolly (mechanical aunt); Chicle (mechanical cousin); Goliad (daughter); Stormo (creation); Earl(s) of Lemongrab (creation(s)); Chatsberry (past incarnation); Pink Pond (alternate self)
- Significant other: Marceline Abadeer (girlfriend)
- Home: Candy Kingdom, Ooo

Princess Bonnibel Bubblegum (also called Bonnie or PB, occasionally Peebles or P-bubs) is a fictional character in the American animated television series Adventure Time and resulting franchise, created by Pendleton Ward.

Princess Bonnibel Bubblegum in the current time used to be the ruler of the Candy Kingdom, which other "Candy People" inhabit. She is good friends with the series' protagonists Finn the Human and Jake the Dog, first appearing alongside them in Ward's 2007 pilot. Princess Bubblegum is the living incarnation of the Candy Elemental, formed from a massive, blob-like, pink gum biomass known as the "Mother Gum" in the years following the Mushroom War. In addition to ruling the Candy Kingdom, Princess Bubblegum is also a brilliant scientist, dedicating her life to improving the existence of her kingdom's citizens, regularly making scientific breakthroughs in her lab. Princess Bubblegum's sexual orientation has not been officially confirmed, however, in the series finale of Adventure Time, "Come Along with Me", she and Marceline the Vampire Queen shared an on-screen kiss, confirming their romantic relationship.

A gender-swapped version of Princess Bubblegum called Prince Gumball appeared in the third-season episode "Fionna and Cake" and Fionna and Cake the show.

== Character ==
=== Personality ===
Bubblegum is typically very kind and compassionate, having a strong sense of justice, sometimes despairing of her responsibilities. She is brilliant, creating the Candy People and various devices, including a miniature time machine. She is fluent in German and Korean, using the latter language to communicate with her friend Lady Rainicorn. Bubblegum is skeptical of magic, refusing to acknowledge it as anything other than "scientific principles presented like mystical hoodoo."

Bubblegum's leadership is paternalistic due to her subjects being naive and childlike. She believes that, without a guiding hand, they'd quickly destroy themselves. Bubblegum is highly protective of the Candy People and cares deeply for their safety, but is secretly strained by the pressures of ruling and expresses a desire for freedom from responsibility for her actions. Following a near-death experience at the end of the second season, she starts to isolate herself and becomes overprotective of the Candy People, even exhibiting authoritarian tendencies temporarily in the fifth season such as installing multiple cameras in the kingdom and implanting tracking chips in every citizen. At the end of the sixth season, Bubblegum is deposed as ruler following an election, where she realizes she has made the Candy People too unintelligent. Following the miniseries Stakes, Bubblegum is reinstated as ruler and becomes less overprotective.

=== Characteristics ===
Bubblegum has light pink skin and long magenta "hair," which is made of bubblegum. Her usual outfit is a puffy-sleeved pink gown with purple trim, and her golden circlet crown with a turquoise jewel. Among many other outfits, she often wears a lab coat and glasses during science experiments. Additionally, Princess Bubblegum's crown and matching earrings have magic properties which protect her from the Lich's mind-controlling powers as seen in the episode "Mortal Folly".

Being made of candy, Bubblegum can deform and reform her biomass, through which she can regain lost body parts and fluctuate her biological age. She usually appears bodily to be 18 years old, though her actual age is estimated to be 827; she was born hundreds of years before the events of the series from a gum-like ooze, the "Mother Gum." Bubblegum temporarily becomes 13 years old after the second season finale episode "Mortal Recoil" due to losing too much biomass after being possessed by the Lich, where she is voiced by Isabella Acres until the end of "Too Young" where she is restored to her 18 year old form.

In the seventh season, Bubblegum discovers that she is an incarnation of the "Candy Elemental," the living embodiment of candy as one of the Adventure Time universe's four classical elements (fire, ice, candy, and slime). Like the Elemental, she can materialize various quantities of candy through her hands and communicate with past incarnations of the Elemental. When Bubblegum's elemental powers consume her in the miniseries Elements, she becomes psychically connected to all candy in the universe. She can transform others into candy, upon which they lose the memory of their life before their transformation.

=== Relationships ===
Bubblegum is friends with Finn and Jake, with Jake occasionally being referred to as Bubblegum's "knight". Finn has a crush on Bubblegum in early episodes, often saving her from Ice King, though he eventually realizes she is too old for him and that she sees him like a little brother. But once they did kiss to make her older Finn is implied to have some residual feelings for a time afterward, over which his lack of closure causes some conflict as he starts a romantic relationship with Flame Princess. Bubblegum frequently tasks Finn and Jake with quests in service of the Candy Kingdom and is often seen socializing with them more casually. Finn refers to Bubblegum as one of his "best friends in the world".

Bubblegum has a strong "bond" and complicated history with Marceline. Though they are initially shown as hostile toward each other, they are implied to have a past romantic relationship in the third season. This history was later confirmed off-screen by Olivia Olson, Marceline's voice actress. In the episode "What Was Missing", Bubblegum's most "prized" possession is revealed to be a T-shirt given to her by Marceline, a fact of which Marceline had been unaware. Bubblegum eventually trades the shirt for Marceline's beloved childhood toy, Hambo, in the episode "Sky Witch". In the season seven episode "Varmints", Bubblegum and Marceline reminisce about a past in which they would hang out and go on adventures together with more freedom, which they had eventually stopped doing. Bubblegum opens up to Marceline about the stress of her building responsibilities and laments that her obsession with playing god had previously caused her to push Marceline away. They are shown as close and amicable throughout most of the series, despite their personalities often being at odds. By the time of the season seven miniseries Stakes, Bubblegum refers to Marceline as her "best "friend"", and expresses "happiness" when Marceline says that they will get to "hang out forever". In the final episode, they share a kiss after Marceline saves Bubblegum from GOLB, and are shown in a relationship in the epilogue. In Adventure Time: Distant Lands, the episode "Obsidian" focuses on the two's romantic relationship. It is confirmed that they were previously exes during the time of the main series, and several years after they are still together and live in Marceline's cave. The episode contains a love song titled "Monster" from Marceline to Bubblegum.

While Bubblegum seems to have dated a male character named Mr. Cream Puff, her exact sexuality, unlike Marceline's, has not been confirmed. As such, reviewers have argued she is either bisexual, non-binary, queer, lesbian, or a combination of the previously mentioned, as both live in a world where "sexuality is somewhat fluid." The season 10 episode "Gumbaldia" reveals that Mr. Cream Puff was created by Gumbald to distract Bubblegum, with Gumbald hoping to find a way to control her in the meantime.

Ice King has a strange fascination with Bubblegum and she is often the target of his kidnapping schemes and romantic advances; it is revealed that she reminds him of his fiancée Betty, whom he often referred to as his "princess." The season 8 episode "Broke His Crown" shows Marceline trying to get Bubblegum on more amicable terms with him. Bubblegum is frequently seen in the company of her "close" companion, Lady Rainicorn. Bubblegum is frequently depicted riding on Lady Rainicorn's back, and the two have a strong trust in each other.

Bubblegum has a younger brother named Neddy, a "candy dragon" spawned alongside her from the Mother Gum. Neddy lives underneath the Candy Kingdom, where Bubblegum keeps him isolated, as he is very easily frightened. Bubblegum is highly protective of Neddy as she is with the other Candy People, claiming that Neddy is merely "built different... we just need to respect it". Most if not all citizens of the Candy Kingdom were created by Bubblegum. In "Bonnie and Neddy", Bubblegum states that creating the Candy People was one of the first things she did after ensuring Neddy's safety, and that she had missed the experience of being surrounded by others she could control as she had been before leaving the Mother Gum. Due to their easily scared and childlike nature, Bubblegum's relationship with her citizens is equal parts ruler and "caretaker", something which occasionally leads to exasperation on the monarch's part.

Bubblegum's first creation was her "Uncle" Gumbald, whom she created after feeling lonely and desiring a "companion". Gumbald originated the idea of a Candy Kingdom but became tyrannical and attempted to turn her into a simple-minded candy person using "dum-dum juice." Bubblegum shatters the bottle in his hand out of self-defense, and he turns into a punch bowl. Bubblegum also created an "Aunt" Lolly and a "Cousin" Chicle, who were also turned into Candy People by Gumbald by his "dum-dum juice". Bubblegum decides to become the ruler of the Candy Kingdom instead and takes the previously sarcastic nickname of "princess" as her own, turning it into her title. Near the end of the series, Gumbald, Lolly, and Chicle are returned to their prior forms and seek revenge on Bubblegum, though Gumbald and Chicle are turned back into Candy People. Lolly repents and reconciles with Bubblegum, helping her look after Neddy as seen in the epilogue.

Bubblegum's other creations include the Earl of Lemongrab and two "candy sphinxes" named Goliad and Stormo. Despite trying, Bubblegum doesn't understand Lemongrab's needs, so she creates a clone brother for Lemongrab to keep him company in "You Made Me". The two end up stealing Bubblegum's formula of life and create their own subjects in "All Your Fault", with the original Lemongrab becoming a powerful and cruel ruler as shown in "Another Five More Short Graybles". Following the destruction of the Lemongrabs in "Lemonhope", Bubblegum recreates Lemongrab using their remains. Since then, it's shown her relationship with the new Lemongrab has been a lot more "amicable".

A male counterpart of Bubblegum, Prince Gumball, exists in Ice King's "Fionna and Cake" stories. Princess Bubblegum enjoys science and talks to Lady Rainicorn in Korean. Prince Gumball is fond of baking. He has a friend named Lord Monochromicorn with whom he communicates using Morse code. Prince Gumball is voiced by Neil Patrick Harris and Andrew Rannells in Adventure Time: Fionna and Cake.

== Reception ==
Bubblegum's relationship with Marceline has generated some controversy. At a panel in 2014, Olivia Olson, who provides the voice of Marceline, mentioned that Ward told her the two "dated", though she later Tweeted "I like to make things up at panels. Y'all take my stories way too seriously". A video produced by Frederator Studios to offer a "recap" of Adventure Time further implied that Bubblegum and Marceline were in a relationship; the video was removed from YouTube, inciting further controversy. Bitch magazine saw Frederator's action as detrimental toward the acceptance of homosexuality in children's television. Executive producer Fred Seibert later admitted that "we got wrapped up by both fan conjecture and spicy fanart and went a little too far" in making the video, which was meant to provide an outlet for input from fans. Ward admitted he did not "really want to comment on it [because] it was a big hullabaloo".

== See also ==
- List of Adventure Time characters
