= Adventure Time season 10 =

2017–2018 season of television series

Adventure Time
- Season 10
- Region B Blu-ray case
- Showrunner: Adam Muto
- Starring: Jeremy Shada; John DiMaggio
- No. of episodes: 16

Release
- Original network: Cartoon Network
- Original release: September 17, 2017 – September 3, 2018

Season chronology
- ← Previous; Season 9

The tenth and final season of Adventure Time, an American animated television series created by Pendleton Ward, premiered on Cartoon Network on September 17, 2017, and ended on September 3, 2018. It follows the adventures of Finn (a human boy) and his best friend and adoptive brother Jake, a dog with magical powers to change shape and size at will. Finn and Jake live in the post-apocalyptic Land of Ooo, where they interact with the series' other main characters: Princess Bubblegum, The Ice King, Marceline the Vampire Queen, Lumpy Space Princess, BMO, and Flame Princess.

The season's multi-episode story arcs include Princess Bubblegum confronting her antagonistic Uncle Gumbald, Finn dealing with Fern's embrace of the dark side, and Betty trying to turn the Ice King back into Simon Petrikov.

The season began with "The Wild Hunt," which was seen by 0.77 million viewers (a decrease from the previous season's finale, "Three Buckets," which was viewed by 0.85 million). It ended with "Come Along with Me," a four-part episode that served as the series' initial finale. Critical reaction to the season was primarily positive. Furthermore, the episodes "Ring of Fire" and "Come Along with Me" were nominated for Primetime Creative Arts Emmy Awards in 2018 and 2019, respectively. A DVD set of the season was released on September 4, 2018.

== Development ==
=== Concept ===
The series follows the adventures of Finn the Human (a boy) and his best friend Jake, a dog with magical powers to change shape and size at will. Finn and Jake live in the post-apocalyptic Land of Ooo, where they interact with the other major characters: Princess Bubblegum, the Ice King, Marceline the Vampire Queen, Lumpy Space Princess, BMO, and Flame Princess. Common storylines revolve around Finn and Jake discovering strange creatures, dealing with the antagonistic-but-misunderstood Ice King, and battling monsters to help others. The season's multi-episode story arcs include Princess Bubblegum confronting her antagonistic Uncle Gumbald, Finn dealing with Fern's embrace of the dark side, and Betty trying to turn the Ice King back into Simon Petrikov.

=== Production ===
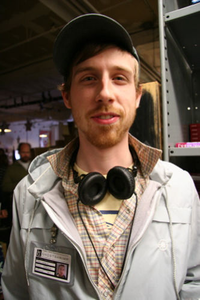
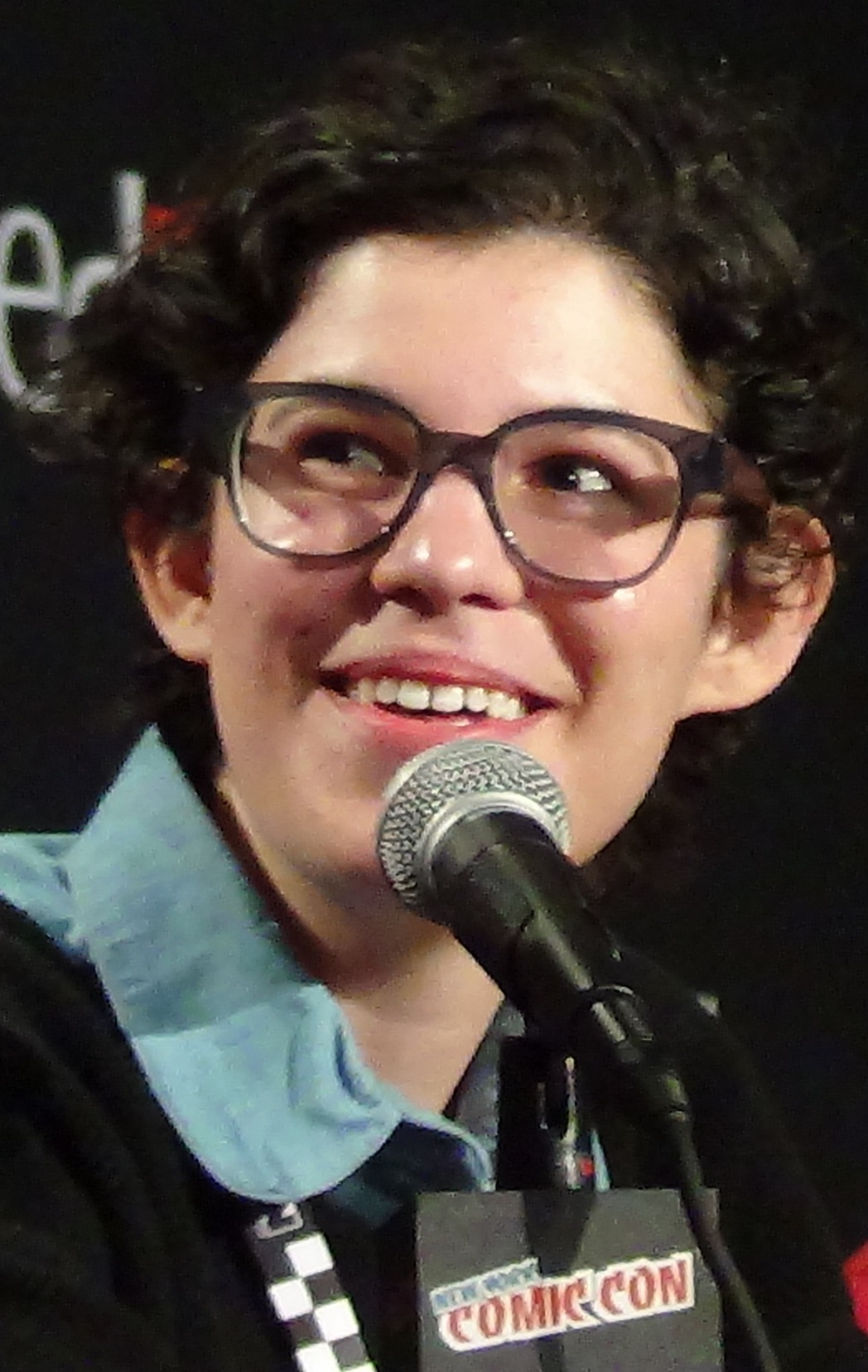
Adventure Time's tenth season saw the return of several artists who had previously worked on the show, including background designer Ghostshrimp (left) and songwriter Rebecca Sugar.

On July 21, 2016, lead writer Kent Osborne posted an image on Twitter which suggested that Adventure Time had been renewed for another season. At the time, the season was intended to be the show's ninth. The season divisions were later rearranged by Cartoon Network, and "The Wild Hunt" became the first episode of season ten. According to series showrunner Adam Muto, the number of episodes ordered by the network as part of the season was substantially lower than it had been, leading the production crew to think "that if this wasn't the end, it was coming up soon." This season's episodes were produced similarly to those of previous seasons. Each episode began as simple two-to-three-page outline with necessary plot information. The rough outline was given to storyboard artists, who expanded it into a full storyboard. (Note: Information regarding story development and storyboard artists is taken from the opening credits of the season's episodes.) The episodes were designed and colored at Cartoon Network Studios in Burbank, California, and animated in South Korea by Rough Draft Korea and Saerom Animation.

Ghostshrimp, the series' former lead background designer, returned to work on the "final story arc of Adventure Time" proper. Although Ghostshrimp had retired from the show after the fourth season, he had returned to draw backgrounds for the seventh-season miniseries Stakes and the ninth-season episodes "Abstract", "Fionna and Cake and Fionna", and "Whispers". (Note: Information regarding background art is taken from the end credits of the episodes "Abstract", "Fionna and Cake and Fionna", and "Whispers".) Former character designer, storyboard artist, and background designer Andy Ristaino returned as a revisionist for this season. Former storyboard artist Rebecca Sugar returned to contribute the song "Time Adventure" to the series finale.

=== Series conclusion ===
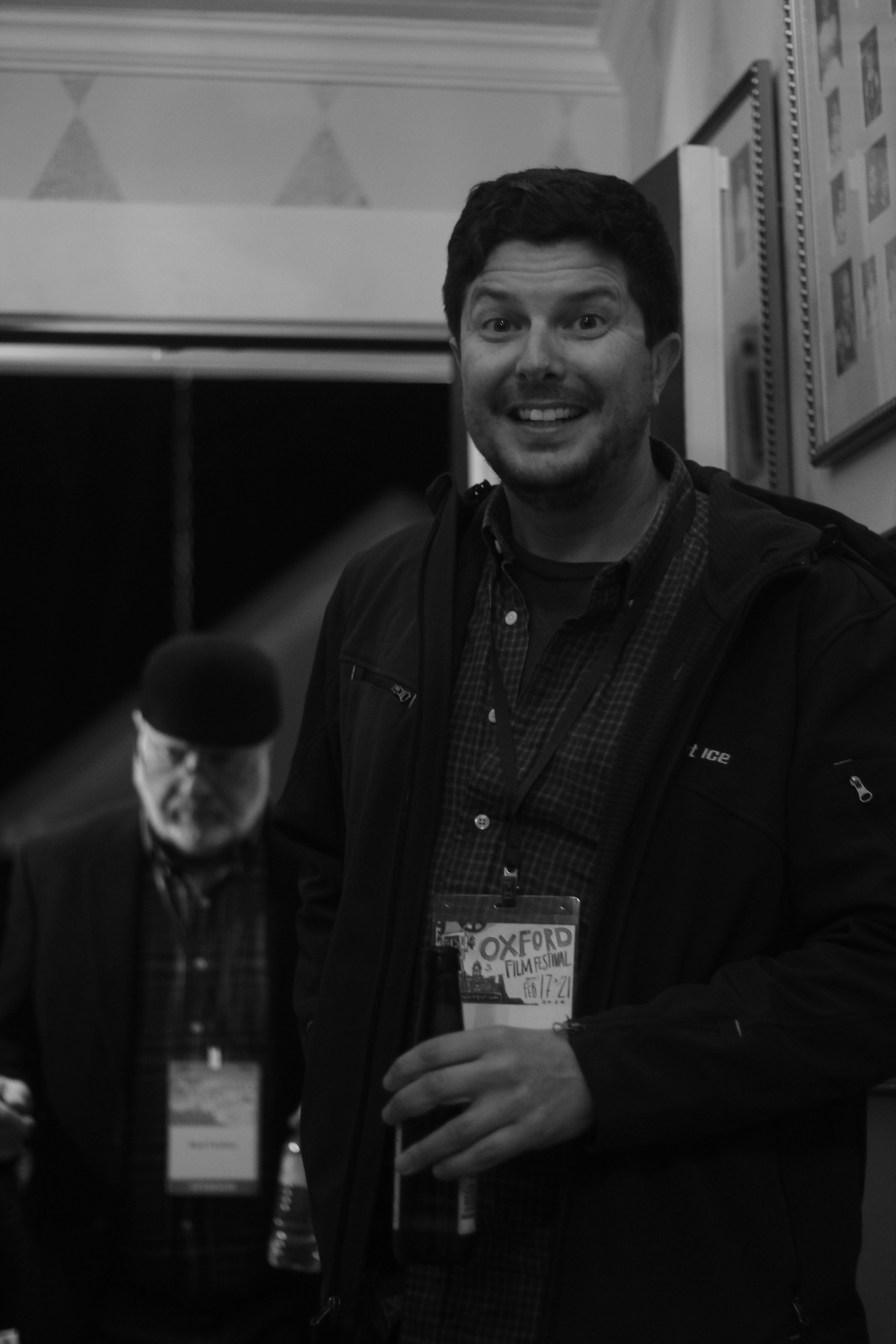
In an interview, head writer Kent Osborne noted that Cartoon Network allowed the writers "to spend a lot of time thinking about the finale."

During the last few seasons of Adventure Time, there was talk at Cartoon Network about wrapping up the series. According to Olivia Olson, the discussion went on for a while, and "the ending of the show was getting stretched and stretched and stretched." About the decision to end the series, Cartoon Network executive vice president and chief content officer Rob Sorcher told the Los Angeles Times:

Adventure Time was playing less and less on Cartoon Network, yet we were moving towards a large volume of episodes. And I really began thinking, "[The end] can't come quickly as a sudden company decision; it needs to be a conversation over a period of time." And it did also strike me that if we don't wind this up soon, we're going to have a generation of fans graduate through the [television] demo[graphic that Cartoon Network targets], and we won't have completed a thought for them.

Cartoon Network ordered a reduced number of episodes for the show's tenth season, and the network announced on September 29, 2016, that the season would be its last. Asked in an interview with Skwigly about his feelings about the end of the series, Osborne said:

It's weird because I've never been on a show this long, and I don't think Cartoon Network has done a show with this many episodes—for the past few seasons, we've been surprised ... every time it gets picked up. And I think a lot of us were thinking in the back of our minds, "When is this going to end? Am I gonna be 80 and still writing this?!" It is sad, and everyone's kind of grieving, but it's hard to feel too bad about it because ... they have so many episodes in the bank that it's gonna play for another couple years.

He noted that Cartoon Network gave the writers "an opportunity to spend a lot of time thinking about the finale." According to writer Jack Pendarvis, storyline writing for the series ended in mid-November 2016 and the last storyline meeting was held on November 21. Osborne tweeted that the season's final script was pitched to storyboarders on November 28; the episode was pitched to the show's producers during the third week of December 2016. A number of voice actors, including Maria Bamford and Andy Milonakis, confirmed that voice recording for the season (and series) ended on January 31, 2017.

Regular production (Note: On November 17, 2017, it was announced that a bonus episode entitled "Diamonds and Lemons" and based on the sandbox video game Minecraft would be produced by Microsoft's gaming studio Mojang. This necessitated the retention of several staff members, who worked on the episode throughout the end of 2017 and the beginning of 2018. This episode was not considered part of the season by the production crew.) of the series ended with a November 16, 2017 wrap party hosted by Cartoon Network for cast and crew who had worked on the series since its beginning. The party featured a DJ booth shaped like Finn and Jake's tree fort, a live band, and Adventure Time-related food. Several crew members were hired for Cartoon Network's Summer Camp Island, created by Adventure Time storyline writer Julia Pott, after the latter's final season ended.

== Cast ==
Voice actors for the season included Jeremy Shada (Finn the Human), John DiMaggio (Jake the Dog), Tom Kenny (The Ice King), Hynden Walch (Princess Bubblegum), and Olivia Olson (Marceline the Vampire Queen). Ward himself provides the voice for several minor characters, including Lumpy Space Princess. Former storyboard artist Niki Yang voiced sentient video-game console BMO in English and Jake's girlfriend, Lady Rainicorn, in Korean. Polly Lou Livingston, a friend of Pendleton Ward's mother Bettie, voiced the small elephant Tree Trunks. Jessica DiCicco voiced Flame Princess, Finn's ex-girlfriend and sovereign of the Fire Kingdom. Andy Milonakis voiced N.E.P.T.R., a sentient robot who makes (and throws) pies. The Lich, the series' principal antagonist, is voiced in his demonic form by Ron Perlman. The Adventure Time cast recorded their lines as a group for more natural-sounding dialogue. Hynden Walch has described the group sessions as similar to "doing a play reading—a really, really out there play."

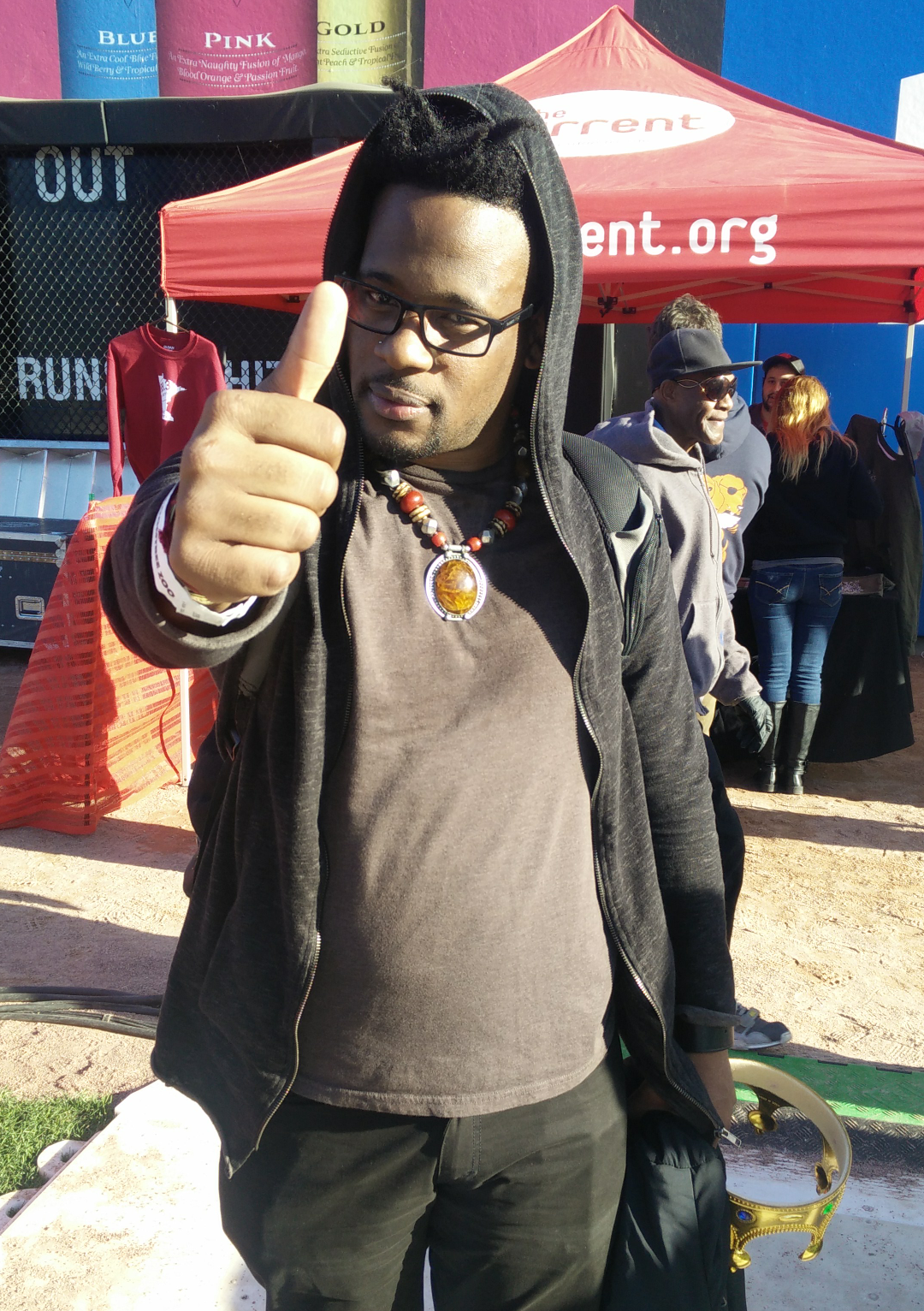
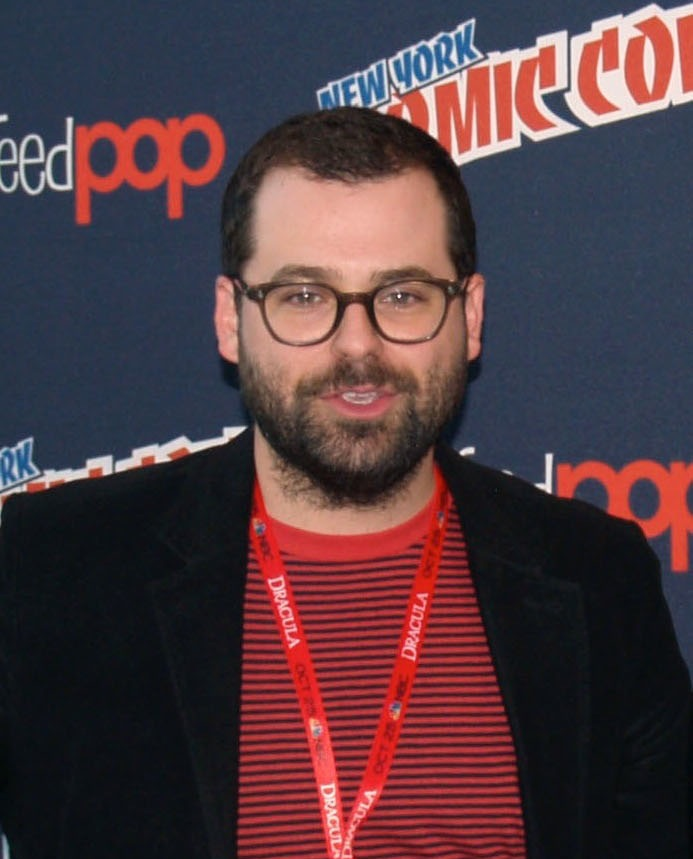
Several guest stars voiced Adventure Time characters for the first time this season, including rapper Open Mike Eagle (left) and comedian Brad Neely.

In addition to the regular cast members, episodes had guest voices by other actors, musicians, and artists. "The Wild Hunt," "Always BMO Closing," "Bonnibel Bubblegum," "Seventeen," "Gumbaldia," and "Come Along with Me" featured Fred Melamed voicing Princess Bubblegum's Uncle Gumbald. In "The Wild Hunt", Jenny Slate reprised her role as Huntress Wizard. "Son of Rap Bear" saw Dumbfoundead voicing the titular character; Rekstizzy voiced Rap Bear, Keith David reprised his role as Flame King, Paul Scheer reprised his role as Toronto, and Open Mike Eagle voiced a gingerbread man. Livvy Stubenrauch voiced the younger Princess Bubblegum in "Bonnibel Bubblegum", and former supervising director Andres Salaff reprised his role as Neddy.

Brad Neely voiced the Green Knight in "Seventeen" and "Gumbaldia". "Ring of Fire" featured David Herman as Randy, Raza Jaffrey as Danny, and Andy Daly as Wyatt. Martin Olson reprised his role as Hunson Abadeer, Marceline's father, in "Marcy & Hunson". In "The First Investigation", Marc Evan Jackson reprised his role as Kim Kil Whan and Dave Foley voiced Warren Ampersand; Foley reprised his role in "Jake the Starchild". In "Temple of Mars", Felicia Day reprised her role as Betty; the episode also saw the return of Tom Scharpling as Jermaine the dog. Day and Scharpling returned in the series finale, "Come Along with Me", which also featured Willow Smith as Beth the Pup Princess, Sean Giambrone as Shermy, Bettie Ward as a dream poodle, Jill Talley as Maja, and Ashley Eriksson as the music hole. Other characters were voiced during the season by Dee Bradley Baker, Maria Bamford, Steve Little, and Melissa Villaseñor.

== Broadcast and reception ==
=== Episode "bombs" ===
Much like the sixth, seventh, eighth, and ninth seasons, the tenth season of Adventure Time featured several episode "bombs" in which several episodes premiered over a relatively-short time. The first occurred on September 17, 2017, when "The Wild Hunt", "Always BMO Closing", "Son of Rap Bear", and "Bonnibel Bubblegum" aired. The second was December 17, 2017 when "Seventeen", "Ring of Fire", "Marcy and Hunson" and "The First Investigation" aired. The third was March 18, 2018, when "Blenanas", "Jake the Starchild", "Temple of Mars", and "Gumbaldia" aired.

=== Ratings ===
The tenth season of Adventure Time had its television premiere on September 17, 2017, with "The Wild Hunt" episode bomb. It was watched by 0.77 million viewers and scored a 0.24 Nielsen rating in the 18-to- 49-year-old demographic. Nielsen ratings are audience measurement systems which determine the audience size and composition of television programming in the United States, and the episodes were seen by 0.24 percent of all households aged 18 to 49. This was a decrease compared with the season-nine finale, "Three Buckets" (seen by 0.85 million viewers), but an increase from the previous season's premiere, "Orb" (which was viewed by 0.71 million). The season and series itself ended with "Come Along with Me" on September 3, 2018. The four-part finale was viewed by 0.921 million viewers, and scored a 0.25 Nielsen rating in the 18- to 49-year-old demographic. The special was the twenty-fifth most-watched cable program on the day of its airing.

=== Reviews and accolades ===
During this season, Entertainment Weekly named Adventure Time the tenth-best series of 2018: "All the episodes [that aired in 2018] shined with Adventure Time's eccentric trademarks: sweet fairy-tale logic, twisted dark humor, full-blown cosmic adventure, an ability to create and puncture myths in under 11 minutes." Entertainment Weekly argued that the finale was one of the "Best TV episodes of 2018", writing: "'Come Along with Me' is equal parts silly and sad, with music playing a major role. In other words, it's everything we loved about Adventure Time." At the 70th Primetime Creative Arts Emmy Awards in July 2018, "Ring of Fire" was nominated for a Primetime Creative Arts Emmy for Outstanding Short-format Animated Program. At the 71st Primetime Creative Arts Emmy Awards, "Come Along with Me" was nominated for a Primetime Creative Arts Emmy for Outstanding Animated Program, making it the series' first nomination in this category.

== Episodes ==
No. overall	No. in season	Title	Supervising direction by	Written and storyboarded by	Original release date (Note: "Seventeen" was released on the Cartoon Network website on December 7, 2017; "Ring of Fire", "Marcy & Hunson", and "The First Investigation" were released via the Cartoon Network phone app on December 8; and "Blenanas", "Jake the Starchild", "Temple of Mars", and "Gumbaldia" were released via the Cartoon Network phone app and VOD on March 9. However, because this field specifically refers to episode airdates, the information here will denote when this episode first aired on Cartoon Network.)	Prod. code	US viewers (millions)
267	1	"The Wild Hunt"	Cole Sanchez	Sam Alden, Polly Guo, & Erik Fountain	September 17, 2017	1054-275	0.77
Still feeling guilty about Fern's death, Princess Bubblegum tasks Finn with protecting the banana guard from a monster later called "the Grumbo". Finn can't bring himself to kill the monster, since he keeps seeing Fern's face when he is close to defeating it. He later meets Huntress Wizard (voiced by Jenny Slate), who is also trying to slay the Grumbo and tries to encourage him. They find the Grumbo's cave, and Finn stalls again. Huntress Wizard puts herself in harm's way; Finn imagines Fern in her place, and finally slays the Grumbo. Afterwards, Finn and Huntress Wizard casually admit their feelings for each other and realize that the Grumbo was artificially-created. Uncle Gumbald plots to create another monster, using Fern's remains.
268	2	"Always BMO Closing"	Diana Lafyatis	Kent Osborne & Graham Falk	September 17, 2017	1054-273	0.77
BMO and the Ice King become door-to-door salesmen by posing as one body (Ice King as the body, and BMO as the head). After selling a stick to Tree Trunks, they get lost and end up at the dungeon where Gumbald stays. They sell him Finn's baby teeth, which he happily pays for with a silver cup. Finn is outraged that his baby teeth were sold and is mortified when baby Finns (made of teeth) begin attacking the treehouse. With the Ice King's encouragement, BMO "sells" two mallets to Finn and Jake, who defeat the tooth babies. Afterward, Gumbald admits that his plan was a bad idea.
269	3	"Son of Rap Bear"	Diana Lafyatis	Seo Kim & Somvilay Xayaphone	September 17, 2017	1054-276	0.77
At a party, Flame Princess accidentally signs a contract with Toronto to forfeit her kingdom to him if she loses a rap battle with Son of Rap Bear (voiced by Dumbfoundead). She and Finn meet Rap Bear (voiced by Rekstizzy), who says that his son blew his legs off; this frightens them. Flame Princess feels ill-prepared despite her training and visits her father, the deposed Flame King (voiced by Keith David). Although she tries to mend their rocky relationship, she is frustrated by her father's apparent oblivion to the pain he caused her. Flame Princess begins to lose her composure at the rap battle but expresses her anger when she sees the still-unapologetic Flame King in the crowd. Her rap impresses the crowd, and she defeats Son of Rap Bear.
270	4	"Bonnibel Bubblegum"	Diana Lafyatis	Aleks Sennwald & Hanna K. Nyström	September 17, 2017	1054-274	0.77
When Finn presents the silver cup from "Always BMO Closing," Princess Bubblegum decides to tell him, Marceline, and Jake more of her history. Eight hundred years ago, Bubblegum decided to create a gum family—composed of Uncle Gumbald, Aunt Lolly, and Cousin Chicle—to help farm the area. However, her family quickly turned on her, as Bubblegum resisted Gumbald's efforts to "brand" their family and create a capitalist empire. Gumbald decided to stage a coup by dousing his niece with a juice that transforms its drinkers into low-minded candy people. Bonnibel fought back, and in the ensuing mayhem, Uncle Gumbald, Aunt Lolly, and Cousin Chicle were all transformed into the first of her candy citizens. In the present, BMO reveals that it got the cup from a recently-return Gumbald.
271	5	"Seventeen"	Cole Sanchez	Seo Kim & Somvilay Xayaphone	December 17, 2017	1054-281	0.76
At Finn's seventeenth birthday party (held at the Candy Kingdom), Princess Bubblegum, Marceline, Huntress Wizard, and BMO give him gifts. The Green Knight (voiced by Brad Neely) arrives and gives Finn an ax he can keep if he attacks him with it. Thinking that it is one of Jake's tricks, Finn beheads the Green Knight; Jake arrives, and the knight challenges him to a battle by blocking him from his friends. Finn accepts, and they play the party games two-on-three. While they are arm-wrestling, the Knight reveals himself as a revived Fern and defeats Finn. He is stopped by Gumbald, who reveals that he, Lolly, and Chicle were restored from being exposed to Lumpy Space Princess's transformation of Ooo at the end of Elements. The trio and Fern leave, and Finn is devastated by his loss.
272	6	"Ring of Fire"	Cole Sanchez	Tom Herpich & Steve Wolfhard	December 17, 2017	1054-277	0.76
Tree Trunks gets a call from her old flame, Randy (voiced by David Herman), who wants his old ring back to give to his new girlfriend. In flashback, Randy proposed to Tree Trunks after he graduated from high school. Tree Trunks immediately left him and became a sea pirate, meeting and marrying Danny (voiced by Raza Jaffrey). When he lies to her, she breaks up with him and becomes the CEO of a shipping company. Tree Trunks marries Wyatt, her employee, but breaks up with him because of his possessiveness, and he flees with the ring. Mr. Pig and Wyatt (who still has the ring) arrive; Randy gets the ring back, and Tree Trunks and Mr. Pig reaffirm their love.
273	7	"Marcy & Hunson"	Cole Sanchez	Graham Falk & Adam Muto	December 17, 2017	1054-278	0.76
Peppermint Butler gives Finn the Night Blade (a new sword) and summons Hunson Abadeer. Peppermint Butler lets Hunson roam the earth for one day and is restrained from using his powers. Finn and Jake bring him to Marceline, who is again annoyed at her father's ignorance. When Finn and Jake let it slip that Marceline has a solo concert for ghosts, Hunson forces his way in. Marceline's performance is interrupted by Hunson's interference. Chicle (who has been following them) starts a ruckus with the ghosts, who beat the weakened Hunson. Marceline is powerless to stop them, but Finn's new sword saves them. The group escapes and meets Princess Bubblegum, and Marceline and Hunson make up.
274	8	"The First Investigation"	Diana Lafyatis	Hanna K. Nyström & Aleks Sennwald	December 17, 2017	1054-279	0.76
Kim Kil Whan sends Finn and Jake to Joshua and Margaret's old office after one of his employees is frightened by something. Finn and Jake see ghosts and objects move around. Finn suddenly sees baby versions of himself, Jake and Jermaine, and gives Jake a wet willy; Jake had claimed that Finn gave him one, years ago, but Finn denied it. Realizing that the ghosts are time remnants, Finn searches for the source; Jake accidentally frightens Kim's employee and sees his birth from "Joshua and Margaret Investigations". They discover that one of Dr. Gross' experiments, Time Bear, is responsible, and Finn leaves a note for the past Joshua and Margaret. Jake meets his alien parent outside, turns blue, and is taken away.
275	9	"Blenanas"	Diana Lafyatis	Patrick McHale & Sam Alden	March 18, 2018	1054-280	0.53
Upset about Jake's disappearance at the end of the previous episode, Finn reads an issue of Ble Magazine and sees a doodle of a caveman being bitten on the leg by a dog while a psychiatrist sits next to him. Finn writes, "Ouch! Hey, this isn't helping at all!" He shows it to BMO and Princess Bubblegum, but neither of them gets it. Finn then shows it to the Ice King, who says that he unsuccessfully submitted stories to the magazine. They find the building guarded by a passive pudding troll and learn that it has been abandoned for years. Finn and the Ice King decide to publish a new issue with the joke, but the pudding troll does not get it. Finn accepts the possibility that he is not funny but, when he returns home, he slips on a banana peel, rips his pants, and crashes into a massage chair. BMO and NEPTR laugh, and Finn smiles.
276	10	"Jake the Starchild"	Cole Sanchez	Aleks Sennwald & Hanna K. Nyström	March 18, 2018	1054-283	0.53
Immediately after "The First Investigation," Jake is brought by his dying alien parent Warren Ampersand to his home planet and discovers that he must defeat an evil alien to save the inhabitants. Warren gives Jake a special belt and wears one himself. As Jake uses his stretching powers, he becomes weaker, and Warren becomes younger; the belts drain Jake's youth and energy. When Warren reveals his scheme and the fact that the planet and evil alien are not real, Jake switches the belts and tricks Warren into returning his powers and youth. Warren then tries to return to Earth after learning that Jake has children from whom he could siphon; Jake tosses him into a black hole, leaving him stranded on the now-empty space rock.
277	11	"Temple of Mars"	Diana Lafyatis	Steve Wolfhard & Tom Herpich	March 18, 2018	1054-282	0.53
Finn is visited by Jermaine, who says that Jake is in space and they must rescue him. They head to Mars, where Normal Man (now King Man) has Betty working to "cure" her. King Man has them enter a cave to search for a device to save Jake, and they encounter a variety of puzzles. They meet Past Betty, who was supposed to go on a trip in a week but met Simon (changing her plans). Finn and Jermaine tell her that she needs to think about herself, and Betty "changes" her past, so she left that day instead of a week later. The cave is the device, and they are reunited with Jake. Betty tells King Man that seeing Finn retrieve Jake has increased her interest in rescuing Simon; she plans to save Simon and retrieve Margles from GOLB, frightening King Man.
278	12	"Gumbaldia"	Diana Lafyatis	Sam Alden & Graham Falk	March 18, 2018	1054-284	0.53
As Princess Bubblegum prepares for war with Gumbald, Finn and Jake visit him to prevent the battle. They meet with the Gum Family (who are determined to destroy Bubblegum), but when Finn saves Gumbald from falling, they warm to Finn and Jake and sign a peace treaty. Before leaving, Finn and Jake are doused with celebratory juice. When they return to the Candy Kingdom, the juice turns out to be dumdum juice and turns Peppermint Butler into a baby. With no other option, Bubblegum resolves to go to war with her uncle. Gumbald learns about Bubblegum's survival and forms an alliance with past series villains (including a confused Ice King) in preparation for the Gum War, the final battle upon which Ooo's fate depends.
280 (Note: The special "Diamonds and Lemons", which is not considered a part of this season, aired before the four-part finale. This makes "Diamonds and Lemons" the show's 279th episode and the first part of "Come Along with Me" the show's 280th.)	13	"Come Along with Me"	Cole Sanchez & Diana Lafyatis	Tom Herpich, Steve Wolfhard, Somvilay Xayaphone, Seo Kim, Aleks Sennwald, Hanna K. Nyström, Sam Alden, & Graham Falk	September 3, 2018	1054-285	0.92
281	14	"Come Along with Me"	Cole Sanchez & Diana Lafyatis	Tom Herpich, Steve Wolfhard, Somvilay Xayaphone, Seo Kim, Aleks Sennwald, Hanna K. Nyström, Sam Alden, & Graham Falk	September 3, 2018	1054-286	0.92
282	15	"Come Along with Me"	Cole Sanchez & Diana Lafyatis	Tom Herpich, Steve Wolfhard, Somvilay Xayaphone, Seo Kim, Aleks Sennwald, Hanna K. Nyström, Sam Alden, & Graham Falk	September 3, 2018	1054-287	0.92
283	16	"Come Along with Me"	Cole Sanchez & Diana Lafyatis	Tom Herpich, Steve Wolfhard, Somvilay Xayaphone, Seo Kim, Aleks Sennwald, Hanna K. Nyström, Sam Alden, & Graham Falk	September 3, 2018	1054-288	0.92
In the distant future, Shermy (voiced by Sean Giambrone) and Beth the Pup Princess (voiced by Willow Smith) run around in what remains of Ooo. They find Finn's robotic arm and bring it to the King of Ooo, who turns out to be BMO. The robot tells them about the Great Gum War; before the war begins, Finn and Jake try to convince Princess Bubblegum to reconsider after seeing King Man, Betty, and Maja placing a spell. Marceline questions PB's motives, but Gumbald's spying drives her forward. As the battle is about to begin, Finn has another idea, and he, Jake, PB, Gumbald, and Fern unsuccessfully try to have a civil discussion. Jake tosses the nightmare juice from "Orb", and they are knocked unconscious. In the dream world, Gumbald abandons Fern (who begins fighting Finn) and tries to wake up but is stopped by PB. Gumbald and PB switch places and begin seeing things from each other's perspective. Fern refuses to believe that Finn has suffered; Jake ventures into Finn's subconscious to fetch his vault, and Fern realizes that he and Finn are similar. Finn destroys the grass demon, freeing Fern from its influence while PB and Gumbald, "make up", but Aunt Lolly trips Gumbald with the dumdum juice still in his pocket, because he "was never the epiphany type", showing that he was still going to use it on PB and continue the war. As they settle on two candy kingdoms, a worried King Man arrives with GOLB following. GOLB sends his monsters to attack the heroes, and King Man tries to get the Ice King to talk to Betty, who is in a trance. Betty's rude awakening makes Maja explode; she and the Ice King are eaten by GOLB, with Finn jumping in after them and losing his robot arm. As they are digested, the Ice King becomes Simon, and he and Betty make up. The heroes battle the monsters and an infected Gumball Guardian, with Marceline transforming into a giant beast and taking down one of them. Afterward, she and PB confess their love for each other and kiss. Everyone else is critically injured, leaving Jake to take down the Gumball Guardian; he is too late to save the treehouse. BMO consoles Jake with a song; they discover that the song's harmony repels and weakens GOLB and his monsters, and they get everyone to sing. Inside GOLB, Finn, Simon, and Betty hear the song as it forms an exit; Betty remains behind when the Ice King's crown activates. Although she tries to wish GOLB away, she instead wishes for Simon to be safe. Outside, everyone watches as the monsters disappear, and GOLB assumes a humanoid form and leaves. Fern finally disintegrates, and Finn plants his seed at the remains of the treehouse, where a new tree immediately grows. BMO finishes his story as Shermy and Beth leave and realize that they know where the Fern tree is. The Music Hole sings the show's ending theme, "Come Along with Me", while a montage of all the characters (and their fates) is shown. Interspersed throughout the montage are shots of Shermy and Beth climbing the tree; when they find the Finn Sword, they recreate the familiar Finn-and-Jake pose from the show's title card, concluding the series.

== Home media ==
=== US release ===
The collective DVD cover for the domestic release of seasons 8, 9, and 10.

A DVD set including seasons eight, nine and ten was released on September 4, 2018.

Adventure Time: The Final Seasons
Set details
Special features
- Seasons 8–10
- 58 episodes
- 1.78:1 aspect ratio
- Subtitles: English
- English (Dolby Stereo)
- Animatics
- Song demos
- Character-art gallery
- Behind-the-scenes featurette
Release dates
Region 1
Region 4
Region A
Region B
September 4, 2018
TBA
TBA
TBA

=== Australian release ===
On February 20, 2019, the tenth season was released on DVD and Blu-ray in Australia.

Adventure Time: The Complete Tenth Season
Set details
Special features
- Season 10
- 16 episodes
- 1.78:1 aspect ratio
- Subtitles: English
- English (Dolby stereo)
- Animatics
- Song demos
Release dates
Region 1
Region 4
Region A
Region B
N/A
February 20, 2019
N/A
February 20, 2019

== See also ==
- Adventure Time: Distant Lands
- Adventure Time: Fionna and Cake
