= Marcy & Hunson =

- Adventure Time episode
- Title Card
- Episode no.: Season 10; Episode 7
- Directed by: Cole Sanchez (Note: Supervising director); Sandra Lee (Note: Art director)
- Written by: Graham Falk; Adam Muto
- Story by: Adam Muto; Jack Pendarvis; Kent Osborne; Julia Pott
- Production code: 1054-278
- Original air date: December 17, 2017
- Running time: 11 minutes

Guest appearance
- Martin Olson as Hunson Abadeer

Episode chronology
← Previous "Ring of Fire"	Next → "The First Investigation"
- Adventure Time season 10

"Marcy & Hunson" is the seventh episode of the tenth season of the American animated television series Adventure Time. The episode was written and storyboarded by Graham Falk and series showrunner Adam Muto, from an outline by Muto, Jack Pendarvis, head writer Kent Osborne, and Julia Pott. The episode, which debuted on December 17, 2017, on Cartoon Network, guest stars Martin Olson as Hunson Abadeer.

The series follows the adventures of Finn (voiced by Jeremy Shada), a human boy, and his best friend and adoptive brother Jake (voiced by John DiMaggio), a dog with magical powers to change shape and grow and shrink at will. In this episode, Peppermint Butler gives Finn a new sword, the Night Blade. However, he also summons Hunson Abadeer. When Finn and Jake let slip that his daughter Marceline (voiced by Olivia Olson) is performing a solo concert for ghosts, Hunson forces his way in.

Supervising direction for "Marcy & Hunson" was handled by Cole Sanchez, whereas art direction was handled by Sandra Lee. Guest music writer Babeo Baggins contributed the song "Slow Dance with You", which has been heavily discussed and analyzed by both critics and fans for its implications. The episode was viewed by 0.76 million viewers upon its debut, and has received mostly positive reviews, with the aforementioned "Slow Dance with You" being praised by a number of media outlets.

== Plot ==
Finn is in need of a new sword, so he enlists the help of Peppermint Butler, who forges a weapon, the Night Blade, and then summons Hunson Abadeer (voiced by Martin Olson) to infuse it with "Nightosphere magic". Released unto Ooo, Abadeer initially tries to harvest souls, but Peppermint Butler binds him with a spell, rendering him powerless. Abadeer then decides to accompany Finn and Jake to the house of his daughter, Marceline the Vampire Queen (voiced by Olivia Olson).

Marceline is getting ready to perform at a concert for a group of ghosts at the Hamburger Hills Cemetery, and is frustrated when her father randomly turns up at her doorstep. Although she tries to avoid mentioning the concert so that her father will not attend, the news is inevitably revealed and Abadeer forces his way into her concert. During a performance of Marceline's song "Slow Dance", Abadeer accidentally gets into a brawl with several ghosts. Because Abadeer is still bound by Peppermint Butler's magic, he is unable to defend himself. Finn manages to fight off the ghosts with his new sword, and then Marceline transforms into a bat, grabs her entourage, and flies away.

At the end of the episode, Marceline, Finn, Jake, and Hunson Abadeer meet up with Princess Bubblegum in a restaurant; Marceline thanks her dad for trying to support her, even if he caused a scene.

Throughout the episode, Princess Bubblegum's conniving Cousin Chicle (allied with Uncle Gumbald) disguises himself as a ghost and spies on Marceline to learn her weakness, as Gumbald has identified Marceline as one of Bubblegum's more powerful allies.

== Production ==
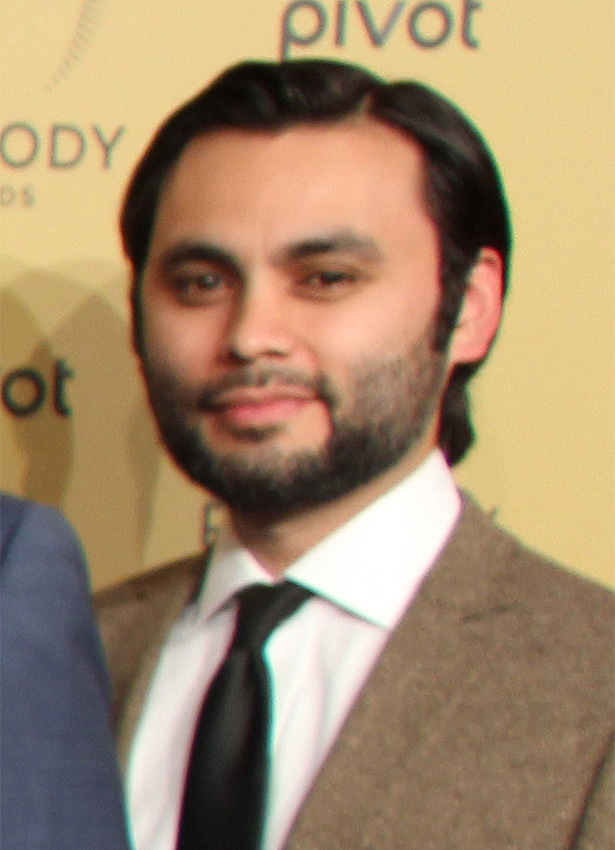
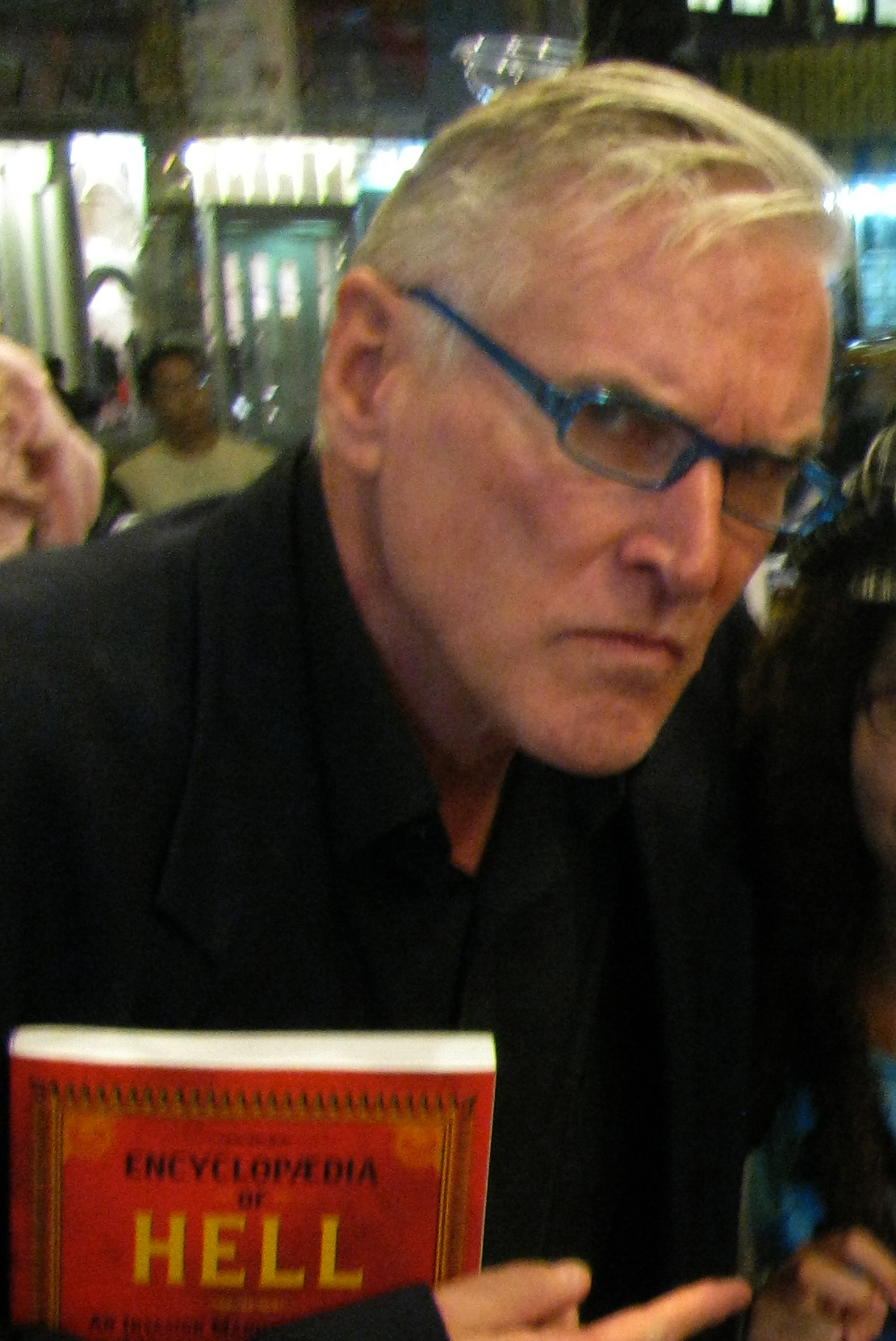
"Marcy & Hunson" was co-storyboarded by Adventure Time showrunner Adam Muto (left) and guest-stars writer Martin Olson (right).

"Marcy & Hunson" was storyboarded by Graham Falk and series showrunner Adam Muto, from a story by Muto, Jack Pendarvis, leader writer Kent Osborne, and Julia Pott. Supervising direction for the episode was carried out by Cole Sanchez, whereas Sandra Lee handled the episode's art direction. As its title suggests, "Marcy & Hunson" features the return of Marceline's father, Hunson Abadeer. Martin Olson (the actual father of Olivia Olson, who voices Marceline) provides the voice for Abadeer. He had previously appeared in the second season episode "It Came from the Nightosphere", the third season episode "Memory of a Memory", and the fourth-season two-part episode "Return to the Nightosphere"/"Daddy's Little Monster".

Series character and prop supervisor Benjamin Anders designed Marceline's look and outfit for this episode. On his personal Tumblr, he wrote, "[Adam Muto] asked me if I wanted to design a couple looks for Marceline for the episode and ended up going with a Yolandi Visser/Lady Gaga look." While the show is animated in South Korea, storyboard supervisor Erik Fountain provided reference animation for the dance that Peppermint Butler does while watching Marceline perform.

The song that Marceline sings in the episode, "Slow Dance with You", was written by the Washington D.C.–based musician Babeo Baggins. According to Pride.com, the song is about "the longing to get close with an unnamed love interest", with many fans online speculating that the unnamed individual is Princess Bubblegum. Via Twitter, Baggins confirmed that they wrote the song about a female love-interest "who didn't like [the singer] cause [sic] she had a boyfriend". On Tumblr, Baggins elaborated:

So, I wanted to give you guys a bit of a backstory on the song I wrote called "Slow Dance" ... I wrote [the song] about this girl I had a big crush on, and she liked me too, but ... she had a boyfriend and I wasn't a boy... (to her). I identify as genderfluid, and I feel very he/him most of the time. I was so heartbroken because I knew I wasn't a "boy" in her eyes but I thought I could be, if she let me. Hence, "I know all the other boys are tough and smooth". It's okay tho [sic], she's a very lovely girl and I wrote a really good song out of it. I'm happy you all like it so much. Just wanted you all to know the root of the song.

Despite Baggins's intentions when writing the song, some online users attempted to argue that the song was not about a female love interest, leading to Baggins to respond that the song is "gay as hell" and was written "for the gays". The demo for the song was released on the official Adventure Time production blog on December 18, 2017.

== Reception ==
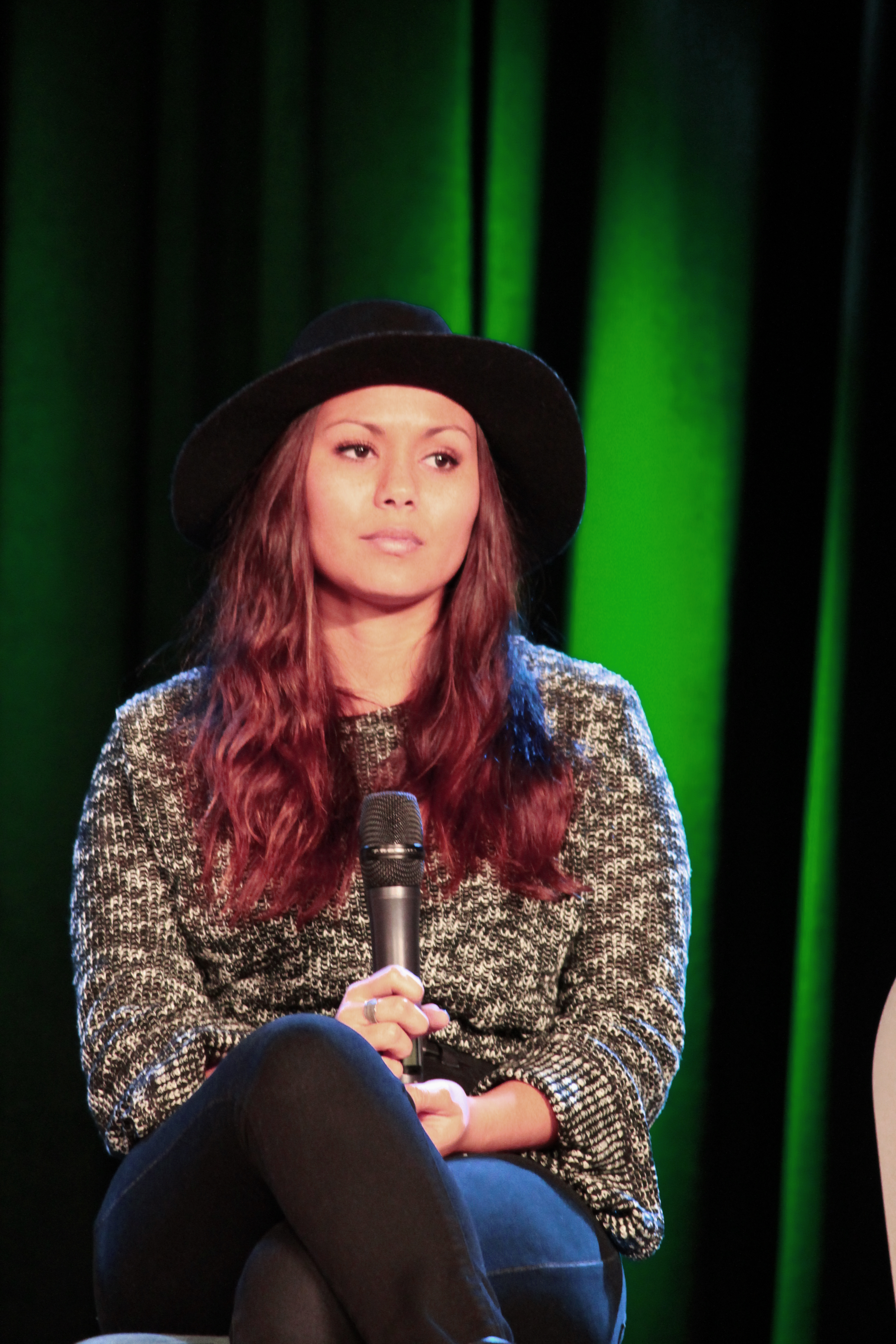
"Slow Dance with You", performed by Olivia Olson, was critically commented on.

"Marcy & Hunson" aired on December 17, 2017, along with three other Adventure Time episodes (viz. "Seventeen", "Ring of Fire", and "The First Investigation") as part of an episode "bomb". It was seen by 0.76 million viewers and scored a 0.2 Nielsen rating in the 18- to 49-year-old demographic (Nielsen ratings are audience measurement systems that determine the audience size and composition of television programming in the United States), which means that the episode was seen by 0.2 percent of all individuals aged 18 to 49 years old who were watching television at the time of the episode's airing.

Oliver Sava of The A.V. Club wrote that "Marcy & Hunson" is "a cute episode, but also the slightest of [the] four [that aired on December 17], telling a straightforward story about Hunson doing the bare minimum to inch his way into his daughter's good graces." He collectively awarded it, along with "Seventeen", "Ring of Fire", and "The First Investigation" a "B+".

The use of "Slow Dance with You" in the episodes, and its implications resulted in extensive online discussion. Many fans of the show were quick to argue that the song was alluding to Princess Bubblegum, although some fans argued that the song was not necessarily an expression of queer feelings (this latter argument was repudiated by song writer Babeo Baggins). Mey Valdivia Rude of Autostraddle wrote highly of the song's use in the episode, calling its appearance "one of my favorite pop culture moments of the year." Sava wrote that he "love[d]" the song, and positively compared it to the work of Mitski (whose song "Francis Forever" was covered in the show's eighth-season episode "The Music Hole").
