= Adventure Time: Distant Lands =

American animated television limited series

- Genre: Science fantasy Action-adventure; Comedy drama Anthology
- Based on: Adventure Time by Pendleton Ward
- Developed by: Adam Muto
- Directed by: Miki Brewster; Jeff Liu
- Voices of: Jeremy Shada; John DiMaggio; Olivia Olson; Hynden Walch; Niki Yang; Tom Kenny; Steve Little
- Theme music composer: Pendleton Ward; Casey James Basichis
- Opening theme: "Adventure Time" by Pendleton Ward
- Composers: Tim Kiefer; Amanda Jones; Dory Bavarsky; Niv Bavarsky; Karen Havey
- Country of origin: United States
- Original language: English
- No. of episodes: 4

Production
- Executive producers: Adam Muto; Fred Seibert; Jennifer Pelphrey; Tramm Wigzell; Brian A. Miller; Rob Sorcher; Vishnu Athreya; Sam Register
- Producer: Scott Malchus
- Running time: 45–50 minutes
- Production companies: Frederator Studios; Cartoon Network Studios

Original release
- Network: HBO Max
- Release: June 25, 2020 – September 2, 2021

Related
- Adventure Time franchise

Adventure Time: Distant Lands is an American animated anthology television limited series developed by Adam Muto and produced by Frederator Studios and Cartoon Network Studios for HBO Max. It is a spin-off of the Cartoon Network series Adventure Time (2010–2018), which was originally created by Pendleton Ward. The series consists of four hour-long streaming television specials; the first special premiered on June 25, 2020, followed by the second on November 19, 2020, the third on May 20, 2021, and the fourth on September 2, 2021.

The series at large follows the adventures of Finn (a human boy) and his best friend and adoptive brother Jake, a dog with magical powers to change shape and size at will. Finn and Jake live in the post-apocalyptic Land of Ooo, where they interact with the series' other main characters, including Princess Bubblegum, Marceline the Vampire Queen, and BMO. Distant Lands focuses on new and returning characters in previously unexplored areas of the Adventure Time universe.

== Production ==
=== Concept ===
Adventure Time follows the adventures of Finn the Human (a boy), and his best friend and brother Jake, a dog with magical powers to change shape and size at will. Finn and Jake live in the post-apocalyptic Land of Ooo, where they interact with the other major characters, such as Princess Bubblegum, Marceline the Vampire Queen, and BMO. Common storylines revolve around Finn and Jake going on the titular adventures, discovering strange creatures, and battling monsters to help others.

=== Background ===
On September 29, 2016, Cartoon Network officially announced that Adventure Time would end. Storyline writing for the initial series ended in mid-November 2016, and the show's final script was pitched to storyboarders on November 28. Voice recording for the initial series ended on January 31, 2017. Several of the show's crew members were then hired for Cartoon Network's Summer Camp Island, created by Adventure Time storyline writer Julia Pott. The Adventure Time finale, "Come Along with Me", aired on September 3, 2018, to a largely positive reception.

=== Development and casting ===
Unlike the previous seasons, the specials debuted on HBO Max, the video on demand service from WarnerMedia Entertainment. The Distant Lands specials have their origin during the production of the show's tenth season. Because the show had had success with specials and miniseries in the past (such as Stakes and Elements), the writers started to pitch a number of stories that could be told in longer formats. Two big ideas that emerged during this time were storylines focusing on BMO in space, and another focusing on Marceline and Bubblegum's relationship. Production for these longer stories, however, was halted when the series was cancelled. Later, when HBO and Cartoon Network began to revive the series for the HBO Max streaming service, the Adventure Time writers went back to these old ideas, and in time they generated the four Distant Lands specials.

Many of the cast from the original series returned for the specials, including Jeremy Shada as Finn the Human, John DiMaggio as Jake the Dog, Niki Yang as BMO, Hynden Walch as Princess Bubblegum, Olivia Olson as Marceline the Vampire Queen, and Steve Little as Peppermint Butler. New characters included Glory Curda as Y5 and Simone Giertz as CGO; both of them were already fans of Adventure Time before joining the cast. Guest voices include returning cast members Maria Bamford, Ashly Burch, and Ron Perlman, as well as Randall Park, Stephen Root, John Hodgman, David Bradley, Chris Fleming, Isabelle Fuhrman, Andy Daly, Ron Lynch, Tom Scharpling, Bill Hader, Julia Butters, Patti Harrison, Toks Olagundoye, Edi Patterson, Bex Taylor-Klaus, Dana Snyder, Duncan Trussell, SungWon Cho, and Anthony Head.

Longtime Adventure Time executive producer Adam Muto returned to oversee the production of the specials, with Jack Pendarvis, Anthony Burch, Jesse Moynihan, Christina Catucci, Charley Feldman, and Kate Tsang serving as part of the writing staff. Storyboard artists who worked on these specials included Ashlyn Anstee, Jim Campbell, Iggy Craig, Megan Fisher, Laura Knetzger, Hanna K. Nyström, Maya Petersen, Anna Syvertsson, Mickey Quinn, and Serena Wu. Miki Brewster served as supervising director for the specials. From June to September 2019, Jenny Goldberg briefly served as art director for the specials, after which original series art director Sandra Lee served in that role. On April 21, 2021, HBO Max announced that the airing sequence of "Wizard City" and "Together Again" would be switched, with the latter airing before the former. After this announcement, Adam Muto explained that, initially, only three specials had been ordered, but that "Wizard City" was added on later and was the actual last special to be made.

The end credits of the final special "Together Again" feature a dedication to four deceased members of the show's cast and crew: Polly Lou Livingston, Miguel Ferrer, Michel Lyman, and Maureen Mlynarczyk. Livingston and Ferrer had provided the voices for Tree Trunks and Death, respectively; Lyman and Mlynarczyk, on the other hand, had been sheet timers on the original series.

== Episodes ==
Adventure Time: Distant Lands episodes
No.	Title	Supervising direction by	Written and storyboarded by	Original release date
1	"BMO"	Miki Brewster	Hanna K. Nyström, Iggy Craig, Laura Knetzger, Anna Syvertsson, & Adam Muto	June 25, 2020
In a distant part of the galaxy, BMO, a young scientist named Y5 (Glory Curda), and a protocol droid called Olive work together to save a dying space station.
2	"Obsidian"	Miki Brewster	Hanna K. Nyström, Anna Syvertsson, Iggy Craig, Mickey Quinn, Maya Petersen, Jim Campbell, & Ashlyn Anstee	November 19, 2020
Marceline the Vampire Queen, with Princess Bubblegum, travels to the Glass Kingdom, which is under threat of the dragon, Molto Larvo, trapped inside a furnace of the kingdom. While currently in a romantic relationship, Marceline has to deal with her past conflicts.
3	"Together Again"	Miki Brewster	Hanna K. Nyström, Anna Syvertsson, Iggy Craig, Maya Petersen, & Serena Wu	May 20, 2021
Finn dies as an old man and arrives in the Dead Worlds, and he attempts to reach the 50th Deadworld and be reunited with Jake only to find Mr. Fox, who now works as a guide for the Deadworlds. Finn's search is hampered by the involvement of New Death, the son of Death and Life, who has killed Death, stopped reincarnation, and taken over the Deadworlds with a tyrannical rule. Finn reunites with Jake, and both of them discover that New Death is under the control of the Lich. After thwarting New Death's scheme, Finn asks Mr. Fox, who now takes Death's job, to be reincarnated into another life, having spent much of his mourning Jake's death. Jake decides to follow, this time "just coming back for fun", and the two go into their next lives together.
4	"Wizard City"	Jeff Liu & Miki Brewster	Hanna K. Nyström, Anna Syvertsson, Maya Petersen, Aleks Sennwald, & Haewon Lee	September 2, 2021
Pep starts as an inexperienced student at Wizard School, attempting to relearn magic. Due to his past as Peppermint Butler, events on the school's campus lead to suspicion of him.

== Reception ==
=== Reviews ===
Professional ratings
Review scores
Source	Rating
Metacritic	82/100

==== "BMO" ====
Reception to "BMO" has been mostly positive. Rollin Bishop of Comic Book wrote that the special's biggest strength is that BMO is "the most innocent and also the most prone to misadventure" compared to the other Adventure Time characters, which made the special itself a "solid watch from start to finish." Others called "BMO" a "blend of dream logic, comedy, and surreal heroism". Other reviewers praised the show for recapturing the magic of the original show, with Petrana Radulovic of Polygon arguing that it shared the same "melancholy feeling" as its parent series. Other reviews were not as positive. Grace Z. Li of Vulture called the special "disappointing" even while praising the performance of BMO. Dave Trumbore of Collider singled out the pacing for critique, writing that the special seemed rushed "when it comes to story beats and character development."

A number of reviewers commented on the episode's social commentary. The voice-actress for Y5, Glory Curda, argued that Y5's story has a lot of context and is representative of coming out into one's identity, defining the self with whatever terms are comfortable for a person. Alexander Sowa of CBR argued that Hugo is a futurist akin to Elon Musk or Steve Jobs, whose characterization is "a clear satire of modern-day corporations and capitalists." Sowa also argued that contra Hugo—a capitalist and colonist who "destroys the world around him"—Y5 can be seen as a fighter for equity who pushes for a new form of social organization that is fairer to the inhabitants of the Drift. Joe Matar of Den of Geek noted similar themes, saying that the story is about those living in Drift realizing that "their Elon Musk-esque tech capitalist overlord [Hugo] is destroying their world," which forces them to come together and rely on one another. Robert Lloyd of the Los Angeles Times likewise noted that the special hints at social commentary toward the end, referring to the destruction of Earth, the nature of resource management, the importance of cooperation, and "the way that certain human billionaires look at space as an escape pod."

==== "Obsidian" ====
Writing for The A.V. Club, William Hughes gave this episode an A, calling it "fan service at its finest" with "plenty of the usual lovely Adventure Time touches". Additionally, Rebecca Long also gave a positive review of the episode for Polygon. She wrote that the episode gives fans the "emotional payoff and answers" they have been yearning for and that the special uses the plot to explore Marceline's childhood trauma, her romantic history with Bubblegum, how the two are interconnected, and fills in gaps about her past. Long also stated that while the special is not "as offbeat" as BMO, it is heavier in terms of emotional weight and plot, and making clear that "romantic subtext" in the original show has "always been straight-up text." At the same time, she states that not all interactions between Bubblegum and Marceline are loving, that the special has flaws due to a conventional structure and storytelling, even with some "inconsistencies in Princess Bubblegum's character design," but is still heartfelt and effective, complete with new music, with Marceline and Bubblegum having "a shared future that feels real." The episode was nominated for a GLAAD Media Award, taking place in 2021, for Outstanding Kids & Family Programming, praised for using the plot to explore Marceline's childhood trauma, her romantic history with Bubblegum, how the two are interconnected, and for giving Marceline and Princess Bubblegum a "shared future that feels real."

Rosie Knight of IGN wrote that the special was a "perfect example of why [Adventure Time] made such a huge impact." Knight contended that the special's strongest asset was "how accessible it is to new viewers", given that both "hardcore fans" as well as new viewers who had little understanding of the characters could still come together and "enjoy this fantastical romp about aging, falling in love, and settling down". Knight further complimented the special for its message that Marceline's power comes from her love of Bubblegum. Knight also applauded the "Monster", which she argued is as iconic as "I'm Just Your Problem" (from season three's "What Was Missing") and "Everything Stays" (from Stakes). Knight concluded her review by noting that while the special could be seen as mere "fan service", it is "fan service of the highest order", "a wonderful animated episode", and "a fitting addition to Adventure Time's legacy." Petrana Radulovic of Polygon argued that 2020, when it came to all-ages animation, was a "glorious gay celebration that was unheard of just five years ago," the development of Marceline and Bubblegum's relationship in the "Obsidian" episode. She specifically said that Obsidian was a "perfect end to this big gay year in animation," while noting that there is still work to do going forward.

Alexander Sowa of CBR described the episode as "a story about time," including various flashbacks, and is a story about immortals, with Sowa saying that Bubblegum and Marceline will "remain young at heart" even as their human companions die. Sean Cubillas had a similar description. He stated that the episode had "plenty of emotion and heart," adding that the episode showed that Marceline has grown up from what she was like in the original series, how Bonnie and Marcy met one another, and how they broke up in the past. At the same time, Princess Weekes of The Mary Sue, before the episode aired, said she found it reassuring because for queer representation "it is important to acknowledge that loving someone doesn't fix emotional issues or personality flaws." At the close of 2020, The New York Times named "Obsidian" one of "best TV episodes" of the year, calling it "the best excuse for [HBO Max's] existence."

==== "Together Again" ====
The episode was received positively. Rollin Bishop of ComicBook described it as a whirlwind "tour through fantastical worlds," with jokes, callbacks, and brotherly love. Bishop also called it an "emotional roller coaster" and compared it to the previous special "Obsidian." Caroline Gao of Den of Geek described the episode as well-adjusted to the long format with a dark tone. Gao also compared the relationship between Finn and Jake in the episode, to the relationship between Princess Bubblegum and Marceline in "Obsidian," concluding that while it is not as profound as the series finale "Come Along With Me," it "fits into the middle of an Adventure Time season" rather than a bonus episode that follows the series finale. Eric Kohn of IndieWire argued that the episode is "endearing, nice-to-have fan service" that isn't as ingenious as the show, but there is plenty to enjoy, with the reappearance of various characters, and said it has a touching moment that resembles Pixar's movie, Soul. Petrana Radulovic of Polygon noted that while "BMO" and "Obsidian" specials have showcased emotions and tried to answer deeper questions, this special begins with a quest, then turns into "something poignant," and becomes an "emotional rollercoaster." Radulovic said that other than the character reappearances, the special is visually gorgeous," and serves almost a metaphor for the journey that Finn and Jake undertake in the show itself, calling the episode a "beautiful, powerful, poignant ending" which captures the emotional depth of Adventure Time itself. Reuben Baron of CBR called the special "pretty much perfect," with the biggest adventure in the episode as death, with the Jake and Finn going on an "epic heroic adventure," willing to give each other's lives so they can reincarnate. He also called the special a great "ending to Finn and Jake's story."

==== "Wizard City" ====
Compared to previous episodes, critical reception to "Wizard City" was more mixed. Kyle Logan of Cultured Vultures felt that the special was tonally disconnected from the original series, and he argued that while "Wizard City" is ostensibly focused on Peppermint Butler, the special fails to portray the character in a way that made him a fan-favorite in the first place. Logan ultimately argued that the special fails to deliver on its story potential. Alejandra Bodden of Bleeding Cool was surprised by the number of deaths in the episode; she wrote that while she enjoyed Peps, she found the special's plot to be "kind of a fucked up story and situation to be in." Although she felt that "Wizard City" was the weakest out of the four Distant Lands episodes, Bodden wrote that it was still an enjoyable experience overall. Writing for Bubble Blabber, David Kaldor wrote that the episode was a strange conclusion to the Distant Lands specials. Kaldor felt that, in terms of writing, the special was "pretty adequate", but he felt that it lacked the emotional punch of the previous three episodes.

Reuben Baron of Comic Book Resources contrasted the episode to the sixth-season episode "Gold Stars" and the ninth-season episode "Whispers," given similar themes in all three; despite the runtime of the latter two episode being around 20 minutes, Baron felt that they were more interesting than the 40-minutes "Wizard City", which he argued was derivative. In addition, a side character named Blaine is a non-binary cyclops and a rival of Peppermint Butler.

=== Accolades ===
Year	Award	Category	Nominee	Result	Ref.
2021	Kidscreen Award	Best One-Off, Special or TV Movie	For "BMO"	Won	
2021	GLAAD Media Award	Outstanding Kids & Family Programming	For "Obsidian"	Nominated	
2021	Daytime Children's Programming & Animation Emmy Awards	Outstanding Special Class Daytime Animated Series	For "Obsidian"	Nominated	
2021	Daytime Children's Programming & Animation Emmy Awards	Outstanding Writing Team for a Daytime Animated Program	For "Obsidian"	Nominated	
2021	Daytime Children's Programming & Animation Emmy Awards	Outstanding Original Song for a Preschool, Children's or Animated Program	"Monster"	Nominated	
2021	4th Annual Gay Emmy	Outstanding Animated Series	For "Obsidian"	Nominated	

== Music ==
=== BMO's Mixtape (2020) ===
The album, "BMO's Mixtape (Gilligan Moss Mix)" was released on September 18, 2020. It is not a soundtrack of the "BMO" special, but features remixed music from the original series, as well as a mix of the song "Eternity With You" from the "Obsidian" special. The album is mixed by the American musical duo Gilligan Moss.

BMO's Mixtape (Gilligan Moss Mix)
No.	Title	Length
1.	"Robot Cowboy" (Niki Yang)	2:59
2.	"Summer Swamp Boogie"	2:11
3.	"Good Little Girl" (Donald Glover, Madeleine Martin, & Roz Ryan)	2:05
4.	"Dropdown Rainbow/All Gummed Up" (Jeremy Shada)	4:04
5.	"Fries" (Jeremy Shada)	1:26
6.	"Bacon Pancakes" (John DiMaggio)	2:03
7.	"Oh BMO" (Niki Yang)	0:53
8.	"Juke Bug"	1:15
9.	"Sleepy Puppies" (Jeremy Shada)	3:30
10.	"Time Adventure" (Niki Yang)	2:22
11.	"Eternity With You" (Michaela Dietz & Gilligan Moss)	3:50
Total length:		26:34

=== "Obsidian" soundtrack (2020) ===
The soundtrack to "Obsidian" was released on November 20, 2020. The album also features a promotional cover of the song "Monster" sung by American singer-songwriter King Princess. This track was released as a single on November 13, 2020.

Adventure Time: Distant Lands – Obsidian (Original Soundtrack)
No.	Title	Length
1.	"Welcome to the Glass Kingdom"	1:59
2.	"Glassboy Meets the Dragon Larvo"	2:08
3.	"It's Funny" (Charlotte Nicdao)	1:02
4.	"Glassboy on the Run"	0:56
5.	"Marceline and Princess Bubblegum Domestic Bliss"	1:07
6.	"I'm Too Old to Die"	0:36
7.	"Marceline and Princess Bubblegum Visit the Glass Kingdom"	0:55
8.	"Marceline Breaks into the Glass Kingdom"	1:44
9.	"Marceline Came to Play Hard"	0:32
10.	"Woke Up" (Olivia Olson and Zuzu)	2:21
11.	"Marceline Appears Victorious"	2:05
12.	"Young Marceline"	1:09
13.	"Red Light" (Audrey Bennett)	0:29
14.	"Princess Bubblegum Discovery During a Glassassin Attack"	0:48
15.	"Flashback Marceline and Princess Bubblegum Argue"	0:53
16.	"Marceline Returns to Her Bunker"	1:11
17.	"See Through" (Michaela Dietz)	0:33
18.	"Plan to Defeat Larvo"	0:30
19.	"Marceline's Reckoning"	1:26
20.	"It's Me Glassboy!"	0:32
21.	"Larvo Strikes"	2:51
22.	"This Thing Really Hates Me"	2:50
23.	"Monster" (Olivia Olson and Half Shy)	1:39
24.	"I Love You, OK!"	2:57
25.	"Simon to the Rescue"	0:35
26.	"Eternity with You" (Michaela Dietz and Zuzu)	2:22
27.	"It's Funny (Demo)" (Aleks Sennwald and Pete Toms)	1:03
28.	"Woke Up (Demo)" (Zuzu and Kurran Karbal)	2:22
29.	"Monster (Demo)" (Half Shy)	2:50
30.	"Eternity With You (Demo)" (Zuzu and Kurran Karbal)	2:41
31.	"Monster" (King Princess)	2:51
32.	"Eternity With You (Gilligan Moss Mix)" (Michaela Dietz and Gilligan Moss)	3:49
Total length:		51:46

== Home media ==
The series was released on DVD and Blu-ray on March 8, 2022.

Adventure Time: Distant Lands
Set details
- 4 episodes of Distant Lands
- 1080p high-definition video
- English 5.1 DTS-HD Master Audio sound
- Subtitles: English, French
Release dates
Region 1
Region 4
Region A
Region B
March 8, 2022
TBA
March 8, 2022
TBA
