= Marceline the Vampire Queen =

Fictional character from Adventure Time

- Adventure Time character
- Marceline as she appears in the show's intro
- First appearance: "Evicted!" (2010)
- Created by: Pendleton Ward
- Voiced by: Olivia Olson; Ava Acres (child, original series); Audrey Bennett (child, Distant Lands and Fionna and Cake); Cloris Leachman (old lady)

In-universe information
- Nickname: Marcy
- Species: Vampiric half-human, half-demon
- Gender: Female
- Title: The Vampire Queen
- Occupation: Vampire Queen; Musician; Heir to the Nightosphere
- Weapon: Electric bass battle-ax
- Family: Hunson Abadeer (father); Elise (mother); Simon Petrikov (surrogate father)
- Significant others: Bonnibel Bubblegum (girlfriend); Ash (ex-boyfriend)
- Home: Ooo

Marceline Abadeer, better known as Marceline the Vampire Queen, is a fictional character in the American animated Cartoon Network television series Adventure Time and resulting franchise, created by Pendleton Ward. She is voiced by Olivia Olson in most appearances, by Ava Acres as a child, and by Cloris Leachman as an older woman. Marceline is a fun-loving 1,000-year-old vampire queen, as well as a musician who plays an electric bass that she made from her family's heirloom battle-ax. Ward created the artistic design for Marceline, with small changes and additions added by Phil Rynda, the former lead character and prop designer for Adventure Time.

Marceline makes her debut in the first-season episode "Evicted!" in which she forces Finn and Jake from their home. However, as the series progresses, Marceline becomes a close friend to the two. Several backstory episodes have established that she was born to a human mother named Elise (voiced by Rebecca Sugar and Erica Luttrell) and the demon Hunson Abadeer (voiced by Olivia's real-life father, Martin Olson). Furthermore, when she was a child, the cataclysmic Mushroom War occurred, and soon after, she developed a father-daughter-like bond with Simon Petrikov (voiced by Tom Kenny), who would one day turn into the Ice King.

Marceline has been critically acclaimed and is popular with the Adventure Time fandom. The character was also the focus of the seventh season miniseries Stakes (2015). Early in the show's history, Ward himself stated that Marceline was his favorite character because he did not know everything about her history and backstory, which he felt added a mysterious element to her character. Marceline's relationship with Princess Bubblegum created controversy when the episodes "What Was Missing" and "Sky Witch" implied that they had been in a relationship—a relationship that was confirmed in the series finale "Come Along with Me." The relationship was also the subject of the second episode of Adventure Time: Distant Lands, "Obsidian," which was nominated for a GLAAD Media Award for Outstanding Kids and Family Programming.

== Creation and design ==
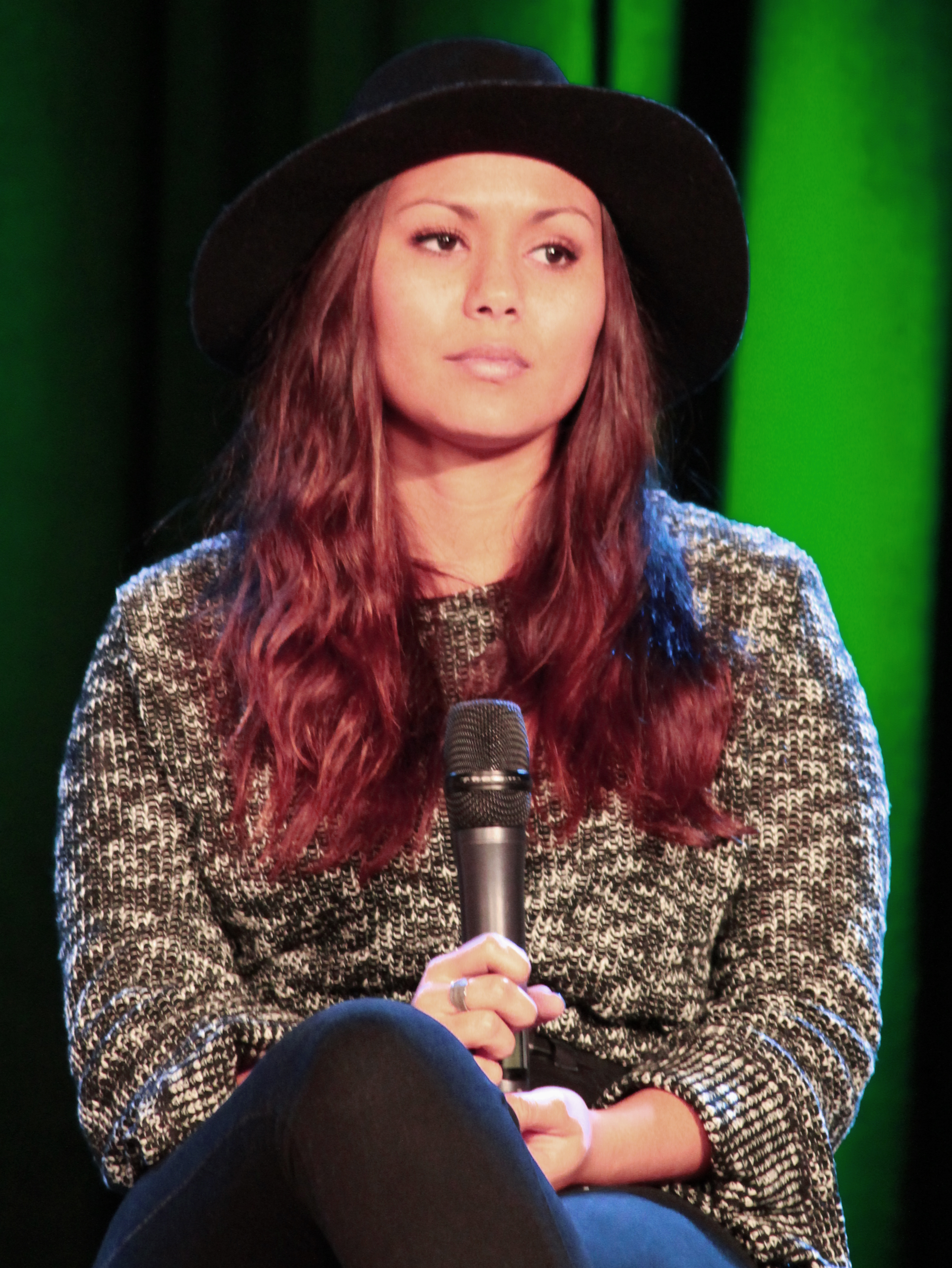
Marceline is voiced by Olivia Olson (2015)

Marceline is one of the major characters in Adventure Time. Although she did not appear in the series pilot, the groundwork for her design and character was present in the series pitch book, penned by series creator Pendleton Ward. Ward purposely set out to make Marceline's character complex, as he explained that "with the female characters it's easy to either write them as clichés or write them as the extreme opposite of those clichés ... I just try to make them have faults and strengths just like Finn and Jake have." Initially, in the series bible, Marceline is described as being "friendly rivals" with Bubblegum. Marceline's name is based on the name of a childhood friend of Ward's, Marie, whose middle name is Marceline. Ward described Marie as someone who likes the horror movie Psycho and wears dark clothing. When Rebecca Sugar joined the production crew and began working on Marceline episodes, the show's creative team encouraged her to put her "own life experiences into the character".

The design for Marceline was created by Ward, with small changes and additions added by Phil Rynda, former lead character and prop designer for Adventure Time. Visually, Marceline has long, black hair. She rarely walks on the ground, generally preferring to float when she travels, moves, and sleeps. Marceline, unlike many of the other characters, wears varying outfits in most of her appearances. Ward said her clothing changes from episode to episode because "girls own more than one outfit". Olivia Olson, the voice actress who plays Marceline, was impressed by her character's fashion design stating, "she has really cool style ... I love what they come up with [in] every episode." Olson explained that when she goes in to record the voices for each episode, she is "totally surprised" by the costuming for Marceline. While she says her lines, she is able to view the animatics for the episode and sometimes has to stop to admire the unique designs. Marceline's physical size and shape slightly changes depending on who is drawing her. Rynda later called this "one of the coolest parts" about the character's animation due to the fact that "every artist leaves a little bit of their own taste and sensibilities in what they draw."

Marceline is voiced by Olivia Olson. When production on Adventure Time began, Ward contacted his friend Martin Olson, who was a writer on the animated Disney series Phineas and Ferb, and asked if he knew who played the character Vanessa Doofenshmirtz on Phineas and Ferb, as he wanted "her as a voice" on his show; reportedly, Ward was unaware that the actress was actually Martin Olson's daughter. During the casting audition, Olivia Olson first read for Princess Bubblegum, but was later asked to read for the role of Marceline. Upon seeing character designs, Olson was "definitely impressed by the character". Because Ward knew that he wanted Olivia on his show, Martin Olson later joked that her audition was simply a "sham" to please network executives. In order to get into character, Olson often dresses in a manner similar to Marceline when she records her lines; she explained, "I always find ... that on the days that I go in to record Marceline, I'll dress like her, in a weird way ... I'll throw on some rock n' roll boots, maybe some red lipstick, and just go in there." In flashback sequences, younger Marceline is voiced by Ava Acres. In the fifth season episodes "Finn the Human" / "Jake the Dog", an older, alternate universe version of the character is voiced by Cloris Leachman. Martin Olson also provides the voice for Marceline's demonic father Hunson Abadeer. Olivia Olson later noted that the opportunity to voice act with her father was "pretty cool".

Olson also is the character's singing voice. Composers Casey James Basichis and Tim Kiefer produce the bass music that the character performs in the series. The songs themselves were written by storyboard artists, or other people affiliated with production, and the demos for many of these songs were later uploaded onto the internet by those affiliated with the show.

== Appearances ==
=== In Adventure Time (2010–2018) ===
Roughly a thousand years prior to the events of the series, Marceline was born to a demon lord, Hunson Abadeer (voiced by Martin Olson), and a human woman (voiced by Rebecca Sugar). Abadeer is the ruler of the Nightosphere—a Hellish dimension sustained by "chaotic evil"—and subsists on the souls of sentient beings. Following the Mushroom War (a mysterious war that ravaged the earth one thousand years prior to events of the series) and the death of her mother, Marceline was left abandoned on Earth and was found by Simon Petrikov—the name of the Ice King before he was overcome by the evil power of his crown. The two developed a caring relationship, although the crown took a toll on Simon's mental health, forcing him to leave Marceline alone. During this period in her life, she was reunited with her father, only to be disgusted by his cold and heartless ways. Although she attempted to tolerate his evil and selfish antics, she eventually severed all ties with Abadeer after she discovered him eating fries that she had made for herself. In the following years, Marceline roamed the land of Ooo and began killing vampires, who had taken over much of the land. Marceline soon discovered that, upon killing a vampire, she was able to acquire their unique abilities thanks to her demonic power to absorb souls. However, when she tried to fight the Vampire King, she was bitten and turned into a vampire herself. At some point, she began a romantic relationship with a magician named Ash. The two would move into the Tree Fort, but their relationship would come to an end when Ash sold Hambo to a witch. Presumably, around this time, Marceline befriended Princess Bubblegum, the leader of the Candy Kingdom; the two would often avoid official royal meetings and explore the Candy Kingdom's rock candy mining complex. Eventually, due largely to the mounting stress of running her kingdom, Bubblegum pushed Marceline away, leading to a rift between the two that lasted for a while.

In the series' present, Marceline eventually comes into contact with Finn and Jake in the first season episode "Evicted!", when she forces them from their home. In the episode "Henchman", Marceline tricks Finn into becoming her accomplice. In the episode, Finn discovers that Marceline is fond of mischief and pranks. Soon thereafter, the two develop a friendship. In the second season premiere "It Came From the Nightosphere", Abadeer is accidentally summoned to Ooo by Finn. While Abadeer ravages the land, Finn discovers that there is animosity between Marceline and her father. Finn manages to distract Abadeer by playing a recording of Marceline's "Fry Song", which leads to a brief moment of reconciliation between the two before Finn sends him back to the Nightosphere. In the third season episode "Memory of a Memory", Ash attempts to rekindle his former relationship with Marceline via trickery. Disguised as Marceline's "spirit animal", he tricks Finn and Jake into believing that Marceline has fallen asleep due to a sleep spell that has been self-inflicted. Following Ash's advice, the two enter into Marceline's mind to retrieve the "memory core" in an attempt to wake her up. Along the way, they encounter various memories of her as a child following the Mushroom War. However, the duo soon learn that it was an elaborate trick by Ash; Finn and Jake actually removed Marceline's memory of their break-up. In the end, Finn is able to convince Marceline, and she promptly attacks her chauvinistic ex-boyfriend. In "What Was Missing", past animosity between Marceline and Princess Bubblegum is explored when Finn, Jake, Princess Bubblegum, BMO, and Marceline form a band to defeat the Door Lord and recover what was stolen from them.

In the fourth season episodes, "Return to the Nightosphere" / "Daddy's Little Monster", Marceline's dad returns and gives her an amulet that causes her to become the demonic overlord of the Nightosphere. After an ordeal, Finn saves Marceline from the amulet. Marceline admits that all she wants is for her father to understand her. When Finn wishes for an alternate reality in which the Lich never existed during the events of the fifth-season premiere "Finn the Human", a universe is created in which the Mushroom War was prevented and Marceline never became a vampire. She appears in the episode as a frail and aged half-demon, who was killed when a "mutagenic bomb" that was frozen in ice by Simon Petrikov detonates. Jake manages to undo this reality with his wish and sets everything back to the way it was. In "Sky Witch", Marceline enlists the help of Princess Bubblegum, and the two are able to track down Maja, the titular Sky Witch. It is revealed that Ash sold Hambo to Maja. Only when Bubblegum trades her beloved rock shirt is Hambo able to be reunited with Marceline. After the events of "Sky Witch", Bubblegum and Marceline are on much friendlier ground, and their friendship is reaffirmed in the episodes "Varmints" and "Broke His Crown", from the seventh and eighth seasons, respectively. In "Betty", Marceline sacrifices Hambo so that Ice King—who lost his powers and became Simon Petrikov again—can open a portal into time so that Simon can reconcile with his estranged fiancée Betty. Although the two are reunited in "Betty", due to the rush of events, Marceline and Simon are unable to fully catch up before Simon reverts to the Ice King. With that being said, in the eighth-season episode "Broke His Crown", the two manage to more fully reunite, and as such, manage to affirm how much they care for one another.

The miniseries Stakes, which aired during the show's seventh season, documents the reemergence of five of Marceline's most powerful vampiric foes: the Fool (voiced by Ron Funches), the Empress Eyes (voiced by Rebecca Romijn), the Hierophant (voiced by Paul Williams), the Moon (voiced by Beau Billingslea), and the Vampire King himself (voiced by Billy Brown). The quintet remerge after Bubblegum tries to extract Marceline's vampiric essence in an attempt to make Marceline mortal once again. The reappearance of these vampires forces Marceline, Bubblegum, Finn, Jake, and Peppermint Butler (voiced by Steve Little) to stake them one-by-one; in the ensuing action, Marceline is once again turned into a vampire, but comes to terms with her immortal fate. Later, in the ninth-season miniseries Elements, Marceline is temporarily transformed by elemental magic into "Marshmaline the Campfire Queen"—a sentient marshmallow creature. In her candy form, Marceline is gregarious and playful, but a bit naive about the nature of the new world around her; for instance, when an enraged Flame Princess attacks her, Marceline mistakes the assault for "wrasslin'". At the end of the miniseries, Marceline is returned to her usual self. (Marceline details her recollection of these events via highly allegorical language to BMO in the ninth-season episode "Ketchup".) In the tenth-season episode "Marcy & Hunson", Marceline's father returns to Ooo and attends one of her concerts. While he initially embarrasses his daughter and eventually causes a ghost fight to break out, by the end of the episode, Marceline is touched that her father was willing to support her.

In the Adventure Time series finale, Marceline fights for Princess Bubblegum during the Great Gum War. When the chaos deity GOLB is accidentally brought into Ooo, she refuses to abandon her friend. After one of GOLB's monstrosities nearly kills the princess, Marceline rushes to her side, and after a tender moment, the two affirm that they care for one another and then kiss. Marceline and Bubblegum are shown sitting together on a couch under a blanket during the episode's epilogue, and they both touch heads.

=== In Distant Lands (2020) and Fionna and Cake (2023) ===
Marceline is the focus of the episode "Obsidian" in the spin-off series Distant Lands. Marceline and Bubblegum travel to defeat a dragon that threatens the lives of the Glass Kingdom, where Marceline is revered as a saint for having defeated the dragon centuries before. The episode depicts Marceline and Bubblegum living together as a couple and explores their previous relationship troubles as well as Marceline's childhood trauma.

Various forms of Marceline appeared in the series Adventure Time: Fionna and Cake. Apart from her gender-swapped version, Marshall Lee, she cameos in the episode "Simon Petrokov" when she is trying to get a matching tattoo with her girlfriend, Bubblegum. In the episode "The Star," a version of Marceline known as The Star, from a parallel universe where she was raised by the Vampire King, battles that universe's Bonnibel Bubblegum, with Samantha Puc of Polygon describing the two as "incredibly flirtatious enemies".

=== Other ===
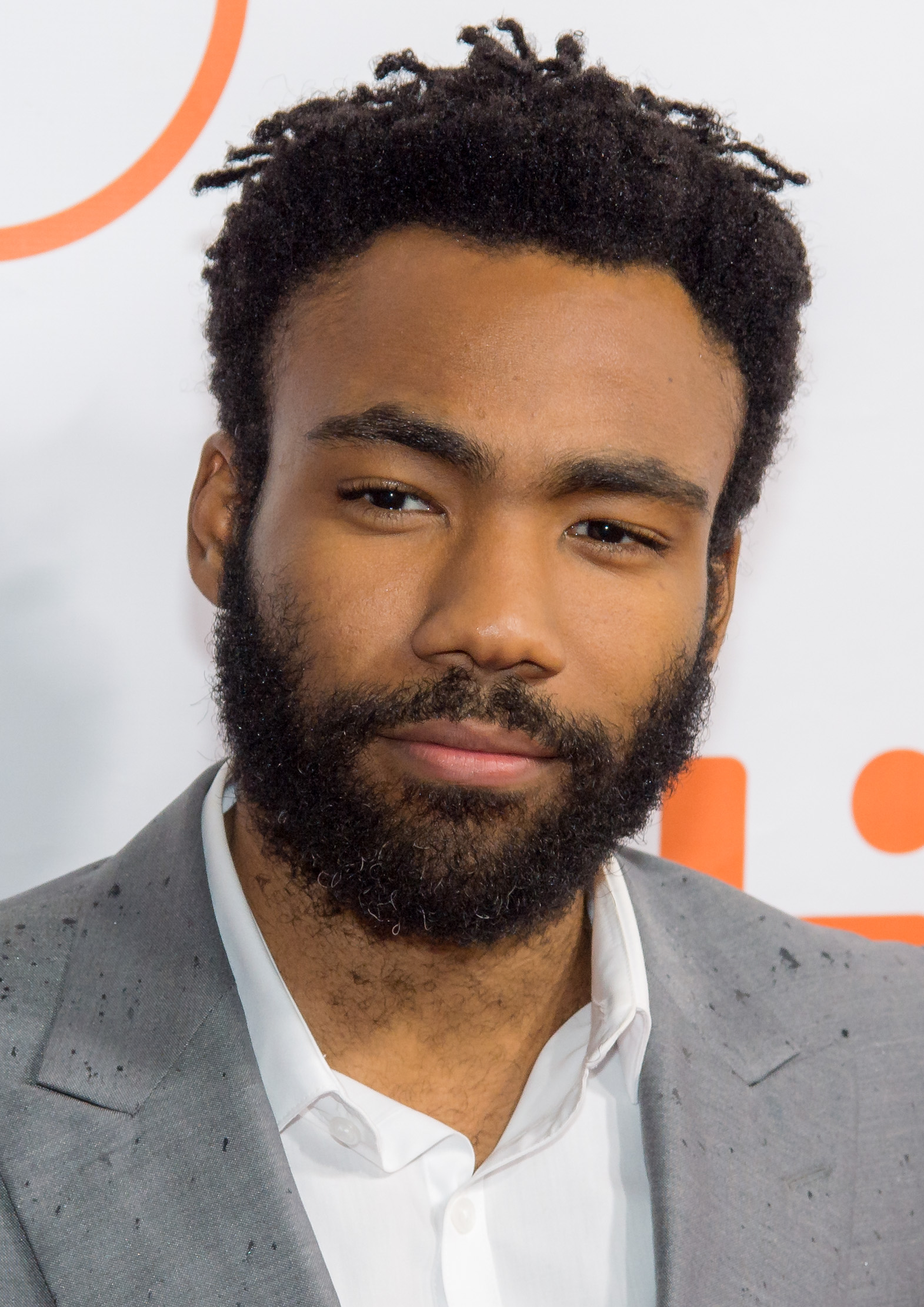
Marceline's gender-swapped counterpart, "Marshall Lee," is voiced by actor and musician Donald Glover (2015)

The gender-swapped version of Marceline—named Marshall Lee—appeared in the third-season episode "Fionna and Cake". This version of the character only had a small cameo and no lines. It was later revealed that another Fionna and Cake episode was in the works for season five, and that the plot would largely revolve around Marshall Lee. The episode—titled "Bad Little Boy"—aired on February 18, 2013. In the episode, the princesses that are captured by the Ice King are tired of his poorly written Fionna and Cake fan fiction stories, so Marceline stops by the Ice Kingdom to show him how to do it properly; she tells a tale involving her gender-swapped character, Marshall Lee. The character was voiced by comedian and musician Donald Glover. Additionally, Marshall Lee makes a cameo appearance in the third Fionna and Cake episode entitled "The Prince Who Wanted Everything", and has a speaking role in the fourth entitled "Five Short Tables".

A six issue spin-off comic miniseries titled Marceline and the Scream Queens, written by Meredith Gran of Octopus Pie, debuted in July 2012. The series featured Marceline and Princess Bubblegum forming a band and touring around Ooo. The series are published by Boom! Studios under its kid-oriented imprint KaBoom, which also publishes the rest of the Adventure Time series. Other contributors to the series include Faith Erin Hicks, and Liz Prince.KaBoom has also published Seeing Red by Kate Leth, and Marceline Gone Adrift by Gran.

In the realm of video games, Marceline has also been featured in the iOS game Adventure Time: Rock Bandits, the toys-to-life video game Lego Dimensions, and the free-to-play crossover fighting game Multiversus.

== Characteristics ==
=== Personality and traits ===
I'm not mean, I'm a thousand years old and I just lost track of my moral code.

— Marceline, describing her personality in the "House Hunting Song" from "Evicted!"

Marceline is a half-demon and half-human vampire. She assumed the title "Vampire Queen" after having killed the previous Vampire King prior to the start of the show. Although she is over 1,000 years old, she takes on the physical appearance of an 18- to 21-year-old. She is ethnically Black on her mother's side, but her skin is bone-white because of her father, a demon with pale blue skin. Having spent centuries traversing the Land of Ooo, she has evolved into a "fearless daredevil", and her fondness for mischief has turned her into something of a trickster. Consequently, in her first role, Marceline functions as the antagonist of the story, forcing Finn and Jake from their home. However, she eventually becomes their close friend once Finn recognizes that she is "a radical dame who likes to play games".

Unlike traditional Western vampires, Marceline subsists not off blood, but rather the color red. Items she drinks the red from are rendered grey afterward, including, on one occasion, Princess Bubblegum. Since she is only sated by the color itself, blood is appealing simply due to its hue (although Ward noted on his Formspring that she "drinks blood sometimes"). When Marceline is deprived of red, she enters a "feral" state, and will instinctively try to kill others and drink their blood. Like traditional Western vampires, she is vulnerable to sunlight and is capable of turning into a bat of varying size. Marceline also possesses several powers, such as levitation, invisibility, self-healing, and shapeshifting; she gained each of these powers after absorbing the essence of several powerful vampires, as documented in Stakes. From her demonic father, she also inherited the power to absorb people's souls. Marceline is also a survivor of the Mushroom War. Hints of her past are sprinkled through the series; in "Memory of a Memory" a trip into Marceline's mind shows her as a child wandering around the outskirts of a destroyed city, and "I Remember You" features her meeting Simon Petrikov in a ruined city.

She was very emotionally attached to her teddy bear Hambo, which was given to her by Simon Petrikov, as revealed in the episode "I Remember You". In "Memory of a Memory", after Ash sold the teddy bear to a witch, Marceline was furious and broke up with him. In the episode "Sky Witch", Marceline enlists Princess Bubblegum's help, and they retrieve the bear, but in "Betty", she sacrifices the bear to allow Simon the chance to communicate with his fiancée. Although she is very independent, her detachment often makes her feel alone, as seen in "Marceline's Closet"; while Jake and Finn are hiding in her closet, she expresses most of her feeling via her diary. Throughout the series, Marceline is seen playing music; in several official sources, she is described as "a wild rocker girl". Several times throughout the series, she jams with Finn and Jake, and various others depending on the circumstances. She is usually shown playing her ax bass, which was formerly her family's heirloom battle-ax. According to Ward, she is ambidextrous, which explains her ability to play bass with both hands. She often finds it easier to express her feelings through music, as seen with songs like the "Fry Song," about her father, and "I'm Just Your Problem," about her relationship with Princess Bubblegum.

=== Relationships ===
Marceline has a close relationship with Finn and Jake. Marceline and Finn have many things in common with one another; in the episodes "Evicted" and "Henchman," it is stated that the reason Marceline befriended Finn is that he enjoys being himself. Although she has kissed Finn platonically on the cheek twice, Ward has noted that there is no romantic subtext between the two. On the other hand, Marceline and Jake share a more complex relationship. In her initial appearances, she derived pleasure from scaring Jake, who was terrified "of her vampire bite". In turn, Jake felt that she was evil and had managed to take over Finn's mind. Due to this, Jake attempted to kill her several times, to no avail. However, after the events of "Henchman," Jake seems to have forgotten his fear of her; in "Memory of a Memory," he even refers to her as a "friend" in one of her memories.

At the start of the series, Marceline shares a tense relationship with Princess Bubblegum. However, as the show has gone on, their relationship has been fleshed out and changed. Marceline was the first person to address Bubblegum by her first name—Bonnibel—which occurred in the episode "Go with Me". Their connections are explored further in the season three episode "What Was Missing". In the episode, Marceline's song "I'm Just Your Problem" and the dialogue between her and Bubblegum implied that they may have had some sort of romance in the past, although the exact nature of their relationship was not yet explicated. This later caused an internet controversy over Marceline's sexual orientation due to the implication of Marceline dating a woman. However, after the events of "What Was Missing", Marceline and Bubblegum's relationship seems to have gotten better, as the two spend quality time together in "Sky Witch", "Varmints", Stakes, and "Broke His Crown" and are seen having a strong bond. In the series finale, "Come Along with Me", Marceline and Bubblegum express their romantic feelings for one another and kiss, and the episode's epilogue shows the two seemingly as a happy couple. In the episode "Obsidian" of the spin-off series Distant Lands, set some years later (Finn is shown as an adult man in the episode), Marceline and Bubblegum are depicted as living together in Marceline's cave and are in an explicitly romantic relationship with each other. The episode also confirms that they had previously been in a relationship and a break-up is shown through flashbacks.

Marceline and her father, Hunson Abadeer, have trouble accepting one another. Initially, Marceline believes her father does not care for her and expresses her feelings through the before-mentioned "Fry Song." Although they admit to loving each other, Abadeer constantly pressures Marceline to follow in the family business and take over ruling the Nightosphere, a prospective job Marceline does not want.

In "Everything Stays", it introduces a group of villainous vampire through a series of flashbacks, showing Marceline’s growth from child survivor to vampire slayer in a post-apocalyptic wasteland, providing glimpses of her doomed relationships with her mother and her best friend Simon along the way. Marceline and the Ice King also have a complicated relationship. In the episode "I Remember You," it is revealed that the Ice King—then the human man named Simon Petrikov—discovered her crying in the ruins of a city destroyed by the Mushroom Wars. It was Simon who gave little Marceline Hambo and attempted to watch over her. This kind gesture made the Ice King a long-time close friend and father figure to Marceline. However, as the crown's power increased, Simon began to forget more and more about his relationship with Marceline until he had all but forgotten their friendship. Former storyboard artist and showrunner for the series Adam Muto explained that Marceline and the Ice King's history was not part of the series' initial plan but something that "evolved from [the show's] original course and it will likely continue to evolve in the future."

In a 2020 interview with Rebecca Sugar and ND Stevenson, Sugar said when she was working on Adventure Time, "people began to recognize Marceline as a bisexual individual based on what we had written about her interactions with other people, but also her feelings about herself," saying that she had "never seen that before."

== Reception ==
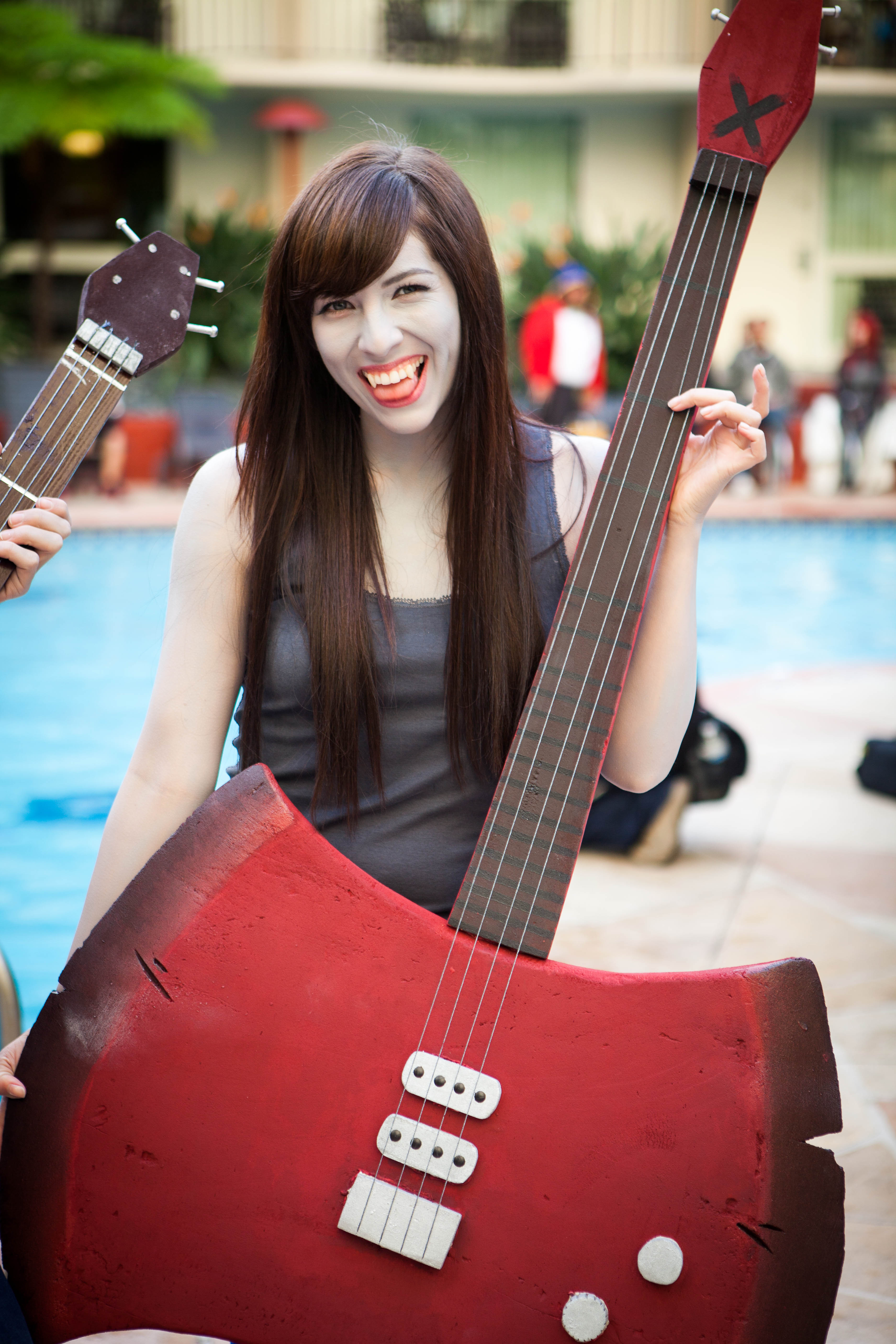
Britt Hayes of Screen Crush said, "it takes a special kind of attitude" to cosplay as Marceline due to her complex character

Marceline has attracted positive critical attention. Oliver Sava of The A.V. Club praised her as one "of this show's most tragic characters." He later wrote that her addition "was a major turning point for the series, introducing a hip, adventure-loving female to the cast who can hold her own against Finn and Jake and also has a strong connection to Ooo's past." Furthermore, he noted that "she's been at the center of some of the show's most emotional episodes," and "beyond her dramatic value, Marceline tends to just make every episode better" because "her writers clearly enjoy writing scenes for her." Susana Polo of The Mary Sue referred to the character as "one of the radder characters" in the series. Cam Shea of IGN named Marceline's introduction in "Evicted!" as the fourth best moment in the series' first season. He wrote that "sure, in this episode, she evicts Finn and Jake from their home ... but hey, this is the first time we meet her, and she's awesome." In a 2022 list of the most "iconic queer goths", James Factora of Them magazine argued that Marceline is both "one of the coolest characters in animation history" and "one of the finest portrayals of bisexual angst ever".

io9 writer Charlie Jane Anders wrote that Marceline's—as well as the Ice King's—appearance in "I Remember You" was "one of the most intense things I've seen in ages." She praised Marceline's development from a "pretty one-note villain" to a type of person that "we sort of knew". CartoonNetwork.co.uk named her "Character of the Week" on January 24, 2012. The Guardian called Marceline the best character in Adventure Time in a DVD review of the series, noting in particular that "she's ... responsible for some of the show's best songs." Charlie Jane Anders of Gizmodo has described Marceline as "one of the most fascinating characters". Lauren Rearick of Teen Vogue argued that Marceline is important in a discussion of on-screen representation, as she is from "a non-traditional family [whose] emotions ... sometimes mirrored depression". This, Rearick argues, gave the series "the opportunity to explore complex topics under the guise of a children's show." Petrana Radulovic of Polygon said that Adventure Time could have easily reduced its central female characters to outdated tropes, but instead, creator Pendleton Ward and his team broke the mold with Princess Bubblegum and Marceline. He further said that the two women have a "clear, distinct personalities unrelated to their own femininity, but they also share a meaningful and surprisingly complex relationship", and "the two were originally supposed to have a simple friendly rivalry, but writers on the show pushed for that to evolve into a yearning, centuries-spanning romance."

The production crew of Adventure Time are also pleased with the character. In 2010, near the start of the series, Ward stated that Marceline was his favorite character because he did not "know everything about her character yet", which he found to be "mysterious [and] cool". Rynda claimed that Marceline was probably his favorite character in the series because "she's just really fun to draw." Marceline is also particularly popular with the Adventure Time fan base, and after the release of "Evicted!" her popularity grew enormously. Ward later noted that he felt "good about that. It's nice". Marceline is also popular with cosplayers, or performance artists who wear costumes and fashion accessories to represent characters from the Adventure Time universe.

Marceline's popularity has transcended into other mediums of popular culture. For instance, American singer Willow Smith dedicated two tracks of her debut album Ardipithecus (2015) to the character, which were eponymously named after her.

=== Relationship controversy ===
The episode "What Was Missing" became controversial due to implication of Marceline having been in a relationship with Bubblegum. The controversy largely began after an accompanying "Mathematical" recap—a studio-endorsed behind the scenes video series implied that there were lesbian relations between Princess Bubblegum and Marceline and that the writing staff actively seeks input from fans. This incident was addressed by the show's producer, Fred Seibert, who said that "in trying to get the show's audience involved we got wrapped up by both fan conjecture and spicy fanart and went a little too far." Soon after, the video recap and the entire channel was pulled off of YouTube, although "What Was Missing" still airs during reruns. Seibert's decision to remove the video also proved controversial; Bitch magazine later wrote an article about how the episode "handled female desire—female queer desire at that—in a subtle but complex way", and that the removal of the recap and the studio's perceived treatment of the controversy was detrimental towards the acceptance of queer romance in children's television. Ward later addressed the issue and gave a more neutral view; he said that, because there were "so many extreme positions taken on it all over the Internet", he did not "really want to comment on it [because] it was a big hullaballoo." Following "What Was Missing", the pairing of Bubblegum and Marceline became popular with many fans of the show, and was labelled "Bubbline".

In August 2014, Olson told a crowd of fans gathered at a Barnes & Noble book signing from The Adventure Time Encyclopedia, that, according to Ward, Marceline and Princess Bubblegum had dated in the past, but that because the series airs in some areas where homosexual relationships are illegal, the relationship is not clearly depicted in the show. In series finale, "Come Along with Me", the two kiss, unambiguously confirming Marceline's bisexuality and her romantic love for Princess Bubblegum. Muto told TVLine that the relationship between Bubblegum and Marceline as well as their kissing was "an ongoing conversation... It certainly wasn't in the show's original pitch. It was a relationship that evolved over time." Storyboard artist Hanna K. Nyström was responsible for adding in the kiss. According to Muto, this scene was not originally in the script; it merely noted that Bubblegum and Marceline "have a moment". When Nyström was working on the sequence, Muto gave her creative control as to how she wanted that "moment" to unfold. Muto noted, "When Hanna boarded that, there was a little note in the margin that said 'Come on!' with a big exclamation point. That was the only note. I can't argue with that."
