= Come Along with Me (Adventure Time) =

Series finale of the animated TV series Adventure Time

- Adventure Time episodes
- Episode nos.: Season 10; Episodes 13–16
- Directed by: Cole Sanchez (supervising director); Diana Lafyatis (supervising director); Sandra Lee (art director)
- Written by: Tom Herpich; Steve Wolfhard; Seo Kim; Somvilay Xayaphone; Hanna K. Nyström; Aleks Sennwald; Sam Alden; Graham Falk
- Story by: Ashly Burch; Tom Herpich; Adam Muto; Kent Osborne; Jack Pendarvis; Julia Pott; Pendleton Ward; Steve Wolfhard
- Original air date: September 3, 2018
- Running time: 44 minutes

Guest appearances
- Sean Giambrone as Shermy; Willow Smith as Beth

Episode chronology
← Previous "Diamonds & Lemons"	Next → —
- Adventure Time season 10

"Come Along with Me" is the series finale of the American animated television series Adventure Time. A 44-minute four-part episode, it is counted as the 13th to 16th episodes of the series' tenth season and as the 280th to 283rd episodes of the series overall. The episode first aired on September 3, 2018, on Cartoon Network.

The series follows the adventures of Finn the Human (voiced by Jeremy Shada) and his best friend and adoptive brother Jake the Dog (voiced by John DiMaggio), who has magical powers to change shape and grow and shrink at will. In the special, the duo must help their friend Princess Bubblegum battle Gumbald, her vengeful creation. When the antagonists realize that violent conflict is unnecessary, they team up to keep the malevolent deity Golb from destroying the Land of Ooo.

The episode is named after the opening line of the series' ending theme, "The Island Song". Former crew members Ghostshrimp and Rebecca Sugar returned for the episode. "Come Along with Me" was watched by 920,000 viewers during its premiere, and was universally acclaimed by critics, who praised its emotional weight, scale, writing, animation, and message, as well as the conclusion of the show's storylines, themes, and character arcs; most called it a perfect ending to the series. It was nominated for a Primetime Emmy Award for Outstanding Animated Program in 2019, though it would lose the award to The Simpsons episode "Mad About the Toy".

== Plot ==
1,000 years after the events of Adventure Time, a cat-like being named Shermy and his best friend Beth (a distant descendant of Jake and Lady Rainicorn) find a rusty mechanical arm and seek out the King of Ooo (an older BMO) to learn about its origins. BMO relays the events that occurred during the Gum War.

Princess Bubblegum and her allies are preparing for battle with her creation and "uncle," Gumbald. Hoping to prevent the war, Jake throws a potion that renders Finn, Bubblegum, Gumbald, Fern, and himself unconscious. While dreaming, Bubblegum and Gumbald duel while Finn reconciles with Fern. Upon waking, Bubblegum and Gumbald agree to end the conflict; however, Aunt Lolly trips him and he douses himself in his "Dum-Dum Solution," reverting into Punchy and revealing his true intention to betray her. Aunt Lolly agrees for the two Candy Kingdoms to live together in harmony.

GOLB suddenly arrives, having been summoned by Betty Grof and King Man in the hopes of reviving King Man's late wife Margles and transforming the Ice King back into Simon Petrikov. Marceline explains that if GOLB is not stopped, it could lead to the destruction of Ooo. Ice King tries to snap Betty out of her trance, which leads to the two of them, along with Finn, being swallowed by GOLB. As they are being digested, they revert into their "essential forms"; Betty loses her powers and Ice King once again becomes Simon.

Meanwhile, Marceline rescues Bubblegum from mutated monsters, and they share a kiss. BMO, Bubblegum, Marceline, and Jake then discover that GOLB's essence is vulnerable to music and convince all the residents of Ooo to sing in harmony with them to weaken it. This allows Finn, Simon, and Betty to escape—however, Betty realizes that the Ice King's crown has reverted into its essential form as well and will therefore grant the truest wish of the first person to wear it. Choosing to remain inside GOLB, she puts on the crown and wishes to eliminate GOLB's existence—when that doesn't work, she instead wishes to protect Simon at all costs. Because this was her truest wish, the crown takes effect and Betty fuses into a singular entity with GOLB, sacrificing herself to save Ooo. She exits the planet through a portal, leaving the crown behind. Marceline comforts Simon as he mourns her. Gunther puts on the crown, and Jake warns everyone that he'll turn into Orgalorg again, but instead, the crown merges with him as he turns into Ice Thing, the result of the crown reacting to Gunther's wish of wanting to be like Ice King, something Jake doesn't mind.

Fern passes away after sharing a tearful goodbye with Finn, who promises to plant him in the remains of the tree house, which had been destroyed in the war. When Finn and Jake plant the seedling Fern left behind, a massive new tree sprouts from it, complete with a Finn Sword lodged in the top. Some time later, the Music Hole sings the show's ending theme to Finn and Jake while a montage plays of various characters' lives after the Gum War.

Back in the present, Beth and Shermy decide to search for the tree that grew from Fern's seedling. Upon finding it, they venture to the top and Shermy retrieves the sword. The two strike a similar pose to Finn and Jake at the end of the show's opening sequence, symbolizing that they have become their generation's own Finn and Jake.

== Production ==
=== Background ===
During the last seasons of Adventure Time, there was talk at Cartoon Network about concluding the series. Olivia Olson, who provided the voice of Marceline the Vampire Queen, said that since this discussion wore on for a while "the ending of the show was getting stretched and stretched and stretched". Chief content officer Rob Sorcher told the Los Angeles Times of the network's decision to end the series, saying:

Adventure Time was playing less and less on Cartoon Network, yet we were moving towards a large volume of episodes. And I really began thinking "[The end] can't come quickly as a sudden company decision, it needs to be a conversation over a period of time." And it did also strike me that if we don't wind this up soon, we're going to have a generation of fans graduate through the [television] demo[graphic that Cartoon Network targets] and we won't have completed a thought for them.

Consequently, on September 29, 2016, Cartoon Network confirmed that the series would conclude after its tenth season.

=== Development ===
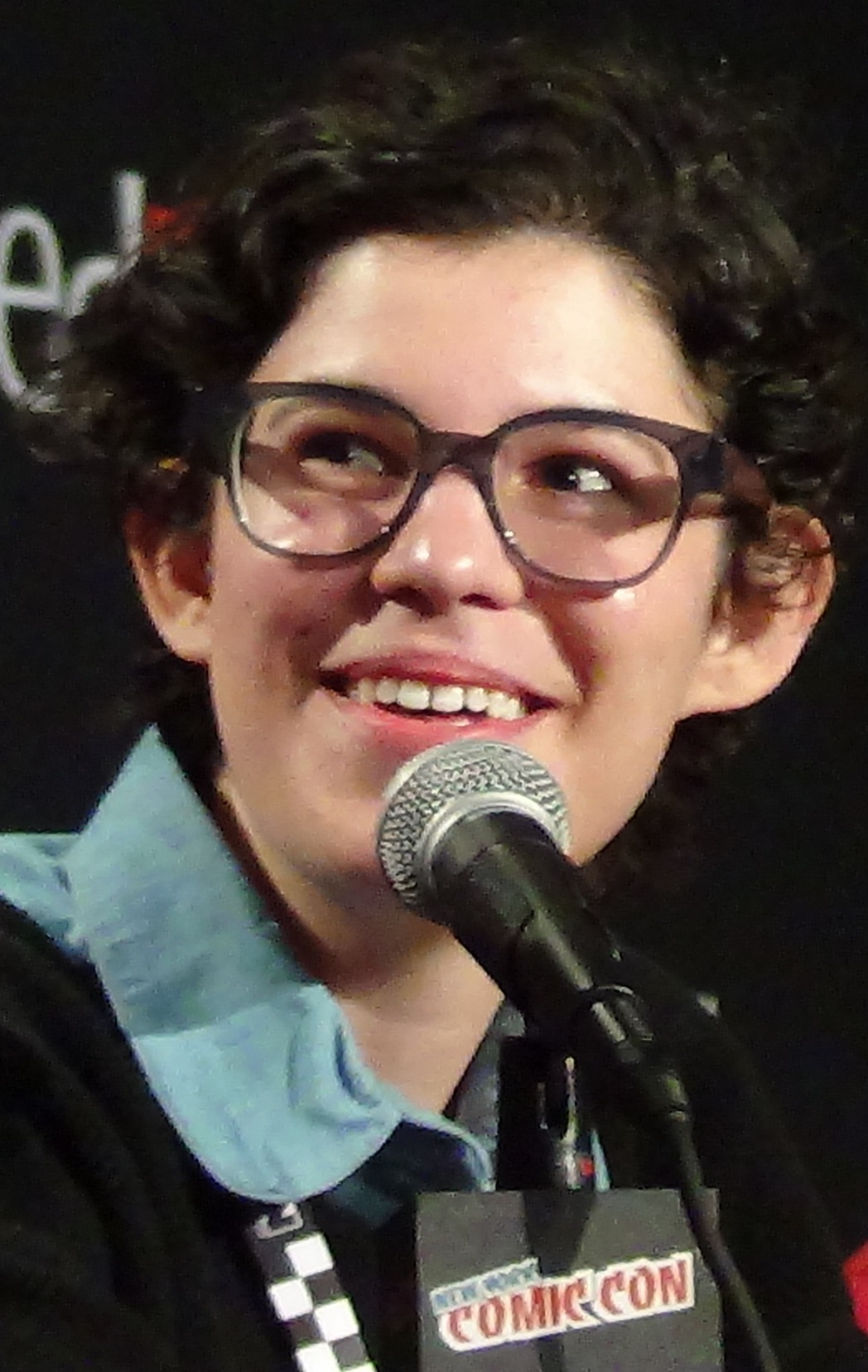
Former storyboard artist Rebecca Sugar returned to write the song "Time Adventure".

The special was written and storyboarded by Tom Herpich, Steve Wolfhard, Seo Kim, Somvilay Xayaphone, Hanna K. Nyström, Aleks Sennwald, and Sam Alden, and Graham Falk. The story was developed by Herpich, Wolfhard, Ashly Burch, showrunner Adam Muto, head writer Kent Osborne, Jack Pendarvis, Julia Pott, and series creator Pendleton Ward. Former head background designer Ghostshrimp returned after having officially left the series during the fourth season.

According to Osborne, Cartoon Network provided the writers with "an opportunity to spend a lot of time thinking about the finale" before production ended. In an interview with TV Guide, Muto explained that the show's writers used many of the episodes preceding the finale to conclude minor character story arcs "so we wouldn't have to cram too much in at the very end here." This allowed the finale itself to be "less dense" by simply "hitting the big [beats] and then finding vignettes for all the characters ... so we could get snapshots of where they could end up."

Princess Bubblegum and Marceline kiss in one scene and are shown developing a romantic relationship in the special's epilogue. Muto said that the relationship was "an ongoing conversation... It certainly wasn't in the show's original pitch. It was a relationship that evolved over time." The outline of the episode merely called for the two characters to "have a moment"; Nyström, being responsible for the scene, was given creative control as to the nature of the "moment". Muto noted, "When Hanna boarded that, there was a little note in the margin that said 'Come on!' with a big exclamation point. That was the only note. I can't argue with that."

According to Pendarvis, storyline writing for the series ended in mid-November 2016, with the last storyline meeting being held on November 21. A tweet by Osborne revealed that the series' final script was pitched to storyboarders, with Alden and Nyström in attendance, on November 28. This episode was then pitched to the show's producers during the third week of December 2016. Voice recording for the episode ended on January 31, 2017, as confirmed by a number of cast members, including Maria Bamford and Andy Milonakis.

Like miniseries Stakes, Islands, and Elements, "Come Along with Me" features a unique title sequence. The sequence was animated specifically for the episode by Masaaki Yuasa's company Science Saru and storyboarded by Wolfhard.

=== Music ===
Former storyboard artist Rebecca Sugar returned to compose the song "Time Adventure", which BMO sings to Jake in order to calm him. Sugar said of the song:

I wanted to write about how even if something ends, it continues to exist in the past, nothing ever really goes away, you only feel like it does because our mind has to process information one moment at a time in order for us to function as humans. I'm so nostalgic for the time that I spent working on Adventure Time and I find it comforting to think that I still exist in that office with Adam [Muto], working on those stories. I would be so happy to come to work and brainstorm with him and sit down and draw on paper and pitch these stories with Post-its tacked up to the wall, just like they did in the 1930s with the stick and the song and the dance, the most traditional way of doing cartoons.

When Sugar debuted the song at the 2018 San Diego Comic-Con, she joked that she wrote it "Because she can't stay away [from Adventure Time]." DiMaggio said that "The last day we recorded we had to do the final song that Rebecca Sugar wrote. I was a wreck when I first had to sing [... it was] like, 'Thank you, Rebecca Sugar, for your beautiful music.'"

Willow Smith guest stars in the special, providing the voice of Beth. She also recorded a cover version of the show's opening theme for the episode. Smith, a fan of the series, previously wrote the song "Marceline" based on the character for her 2015 debut album, Ardipithecus.

== Reception ==
The final moment of the series (bottom image) depicts two new characters, a thousand years in the future, mirroring the final pose of Finn and Jake in the show's opening (top); the ending was acclaimed by critics for its thematic implications.

In its initial airing, "Come Along with Me" was viewed by 0.92 million viewers and scored a 0.25 Nielsen rating in the 18- to 49-year-old demographic. The special was the twenty-fifth most-watched cable program on the day of its airing.

Oliver Sava of The A.V. Club gave the special an "A" letter rating, saying that it was "a celebration of what makes [the series] so special". Eric Thurm of Polygon wrote, "By focusing on this payoff—years of communicating that what's important isn't the adventure itself, but the people you're with and the feeling it gives you—Adventure Time put itself in a position to open up the future of Ooo to all of those other moods, other tones, other perspectives..." Daniel Schindel of IGN gave the episode a 10 out of 10, saying "[it] easily ranks with the best of Adventure Time's episodes, but more importantly, it acts as a perfect capper for the series. It's a thrilling exclamation point, an intriguing question mark, and a poignant, quiet period all at once." Darren Franich of Entertainment Weekly gave the episode an A rating and the series overall an A+, titling his review "One of the greatest TV shows ever had a soulful, mind-expanding conclusion".

Eric Kohn of IndieWire gave "Come Along with Me" a B+ rating, calling it "a 45-minute assemblage of showdowns and confrontations designed to bring together every facet of its fantastical universe [that] salutes the best and worst of the Adventure Time journey". Kohn praised Bubblegum and Marceline's relationship, writing: "It's unfortunate that Adventure Time has to play catch-up with these characters so late in the game, but it nevertheless illustrates the extent to which the show has pushed beyond the conservative boundaries of mainstream entertainment".

Dylan Hysen of Overly Animated called the episode "one of the best series finales in television history" and "beyond what I could have imagined for its conclusion", because it managed to "conclude so many aspects of an entire series ... in such a satisfying way". Hysen wrote of the ending that "[T]he vision of the entire ending depicted is just poetic and I think thematically resonant for the entire series".

Dave Trumbore of Collider wrote that the finale "is the kind of finale you always hope for with animated series" and was "perfectly handled... both in keeping with the style the show has become known for while also delivering a satisfying conclusion to the mythology that's been a driving force behind the fandom". Trumbore applauded the open-ended nature of the ending and its emotional value, concluding: "'Come Along with Me' is expertly crafted and worth watching again and again in years to come, which is just what you'd expect from Adventure Time".

In 2019, the episode was nominated for a Primetime Emmy Award for Outstanding Animated Program at the 71st Emmy Awards Ceremony, but lost to The Simpsons's "Mad About the Toy".
