= Untalkative Bunny =

- Bunny and Squirrel
- Genre: Children's television series Comedy; Animated sitcom
- Created by: Graham Falk
- Based on: Cartoon Sushi short by Graham Falk
- Written by: Karolina Craig; Jordan Craig
- Directed by: Graham Falk, Nick Cross
- Theme music composer: Paul K. Joyce; Shawn Lee
- Composers: David Burns; Wayne Bartlett
- Countries of origin: Canada; United Kingdom
- Original language: English
- No. of seasons: 3
- No. of episodes: 39 (195 segments)

Production
- Executive producer: Diane Craig
- Production locations: Ottawa, Ontario, Canada
- Running time: 22 minutes (5 minutes per short)
- Production companies: Dynomight Cartoons; Treehouse Production (UK); Big Al Productions (UK); Glaverotic Cartoons; Rooster Entertainment Group; Blue Twist Animation IIV marblemedia HIT Entertainment

Original release
- Network: Teletoon (Canada); Disney Channel (UK)
- Release: April 15, 2001 – October 5, 2003

Related
- Cartoon Sushi

Untalkative Bunny is a co-produced animated series about a mute yellow anthropomorphic rabbit and its life in the big city (closely based on Ottawa, Ontario, Canada). The show is aimed for kids 6–9. The series consists of small episodes (about 4–5 minutes long each) with a number up to four longer 'specials' in each season. Untalkative Bunny has been aired by Teletoon, as well as Disney Channel in many parts of the world, including the UK & France (excluding the US). The pilot episode was first seen in the first episode of Cartoon Sushi in 1997, and later in the KaBlam! episode "KaFun!" in 1999. It first aired on Teletoon on April 15, 2001.

The first episode was written by Karolina Craig and Jordan Craig with Graham Falk as creative director and board supervisor. The episodes usually deal with Bunny and the problems of a modern life in the big city, and often features surrealist humour. The show covers topics of contemporary interest such as dieting, vegetarianism, racism, and environmentalism.

Other recurring characters include:

- Squirrel: An orange squirrel who frequently pays visits to Bunny and lives in the wild (as far as a city allows, such as city parks), but still with all the affordable modern comforts. He is sometimes accompanied by his son and daughter.
- Emu: A grumpy, frustrated, and cantankerous blue emu who usually puts Bunny in bad situations.
- Friendly Friend: An unknown pink creature who usually annoys Bunny.
- Beaver: A purple beaver with the latest trends. His favourite sport is hockey.

195 five-minute episodes were made for the three seasons. The second and third seasons were made with Dawn Wilton supervising the co-writers from the first season, although many of the episodes in the third season were written solely by the UK co-producers, Big Al Productions. The series' soundtrack consists of a wide range of musical styles, including bossa nova and jazz, written by Canadian composers David Burns and Wayne Bartlett.

== Series overview ==
Season	Episodes	Originally released	
Season	Episodes	First released	Last released
1	13	April 15, 2001	June 8, 2001
2	13	September 2, 2002	January 16, 2003
3	13	September 1, 2003	October 5, 2003

=== Season 1 (2001) ===
No. overall	No. in season	Title	Original release date
1	1	"Bunny Fish/Clam!/Squirrel of Horror/Passport Photo/Ballet Lesson"	April 15, 2001
Untalkative Bunny swims to an underwater arabesque when UB's apartment is flooded; UB is harassed by a comical clam. Why!; Squirrel stalks UB with a bag of pistachio nuts; UB poses for pictures to get to Honolulu; UB takes a CD-ROM ballet lesson and must maintain a cheesecake-free figure.
2	2	"Rain Day/Airport Luggage Tags/A Relaxing Afternoon with Dostoyevsky/Autumn/New Sofa"	April 22, 2001
Untalkative Bunny mails a letter in the rain; UB visits the airport as luggage; UB's afternoon is disturbed by bells and buzzers; UB turns his apartment into a sick ward for fallen leaves; UB has his sighing eyes on a horse pattern sofa.
3	3	"Milk Day/Papa Bunny/Cat Door Bunny/Squirrel Likes Nuts/Mascot Bunny"	April 29, 2001
Untalkative Bunny milks a cow in a grocery store; UB takes in three stray kittens; UB trespasses a house like Goldilocks; UB is overexposed to Squirrel and Squirrel's hoard; UB and Emu try out for a cheerleading team's mascot position.
4	4	"Squirrel Problem/Office Building/Youth of Today/Friendly Friend/Boogeyman"	May 6, 2001
Squirrel has a pesty appetite for birdseed; UB puzzles with an elevator; UB and Squirrel represent the youth of today; UB meets Friendly for the first time before future misused appearances; UB's bedtime is disturbed.
5	5	"Fly Bunny/Short Ears/Cleaning the Apartment/Enjoy Your Meal/Fitness Centre"	May 11, 2001
Untalkative Bunny undergoes a metamorphosis; Jordano styles UB's fur; UB cleans up; UB is put off by attentive wait staff; UB pumps up.
6	6	"Squirrel Safari/Chocolate Bunny/Psychiatrist/Airplane Ride/Sheep Federation"	May 18, 2001
Untalkative Bunny faints from an encounter with a tribe of soundmaking squirrels; UB schemes to rescue a chocolate bunny from the sun; UB slams teachers in a therapy session; UB abandons Happy Air Flight 909; UB is sheered by a duncey sheep federation.
7	7	"Stuck in a Dump/Farm Animals/Animal Music/Country Morning/Big Race"	May 25, 2001
Untalkative Bunny gets driven to a dump outside of town; UB has trouble interacting on the farm while Squirrel sets up a search for a missing friend; Untalkative Bunny disco dances through the night with a newly hatched chick; UB wakes up perched on a fencepost and is caught having coffee and reading the paper in the farmhouse. Groundhogs make a cute popping out of the ground noise; A fox is enamoured by UB.
8	8	"Rare Golden Sloth/At the Movies/Black Out/Late Bunny/Book Store"	June 1, 2001
Untalkative Bunny poses as a golden sloth at the zoo; UB and Squirrel rent a Mothra video when their theatre experience is dashed; Emu skulks in UB's apartment during a blackout; UB is late for school and has a chat with the principal; UB is mistaken for a reclusive author at a bookstore.
9	9	"The Vet/The Horror of Loneliness/Kindergarten/Shower Curtain Bunny/Car Trouble"	June 4, 2001
Squirrel gorges on peanut butter; UB follows a radio doctor's hugging cure for loneliness; UB is stifled in kindergarten; UB rubs soap in his eyes and gets caught in the shower curtain; UB and Squirrel are terrible mechanics.
10	10	"Turkey/Pet Shop/Fishing Trip/Squirrel Party/Mangoose"	June 5, 2001
Untalkative Bunny frees a turkey from the supermarket with a personality to shrug about; UB browses a pet store and makes a purchase; UB and Squirrel befriend dolphins; Squirrel's son is one year older and crushes UB with an ungracious response to UB's gift; UB has a creepy introduction to pink-faced Mangoose.
11	11	"Summer Camp/Weather Report/Police Questioning/Fashion Bunny/On Vacation"	June 6, 2001
Untalkative Bunny camps unhappily; UB and Squirrel bring the elements indoors through mime; UB is suspect; UB models a fruit plate; Emu spoils the salad bar at the Giant Peanut Motel.
12	12	"Sleeping Pastry Ballet/Cell Phone/Vegetable Factory/Big Date/Bunny and Beaver"	June 7, 2001
Untalkative Bunny, Squirrel, and Emu perform a ballet story; UB runs errands for the father of a stranger who tossed out his cell phone; UB wanders a vegetable factory; A matchmaking cat sets UB and Squirrel up on a date; UB visits Beaver for television.
13	13	"Bungee Bunny/Sports Store/Acting School/In the Basement/Gymnastics"	June 8, 2001
Untalkative Bunny cautiously approaches an elastic thrill recreation activity; UB shops at a sports store and lets his football imagination run wild; UB joins an acting school and flexes his thespian talents; UB blows a fuse and explores the basement of his apartment building; UB holds an Olympiad.

=== Season 2 (2002–2003) ===
No. overall	No. in season	Title	Original release date
14	1	"Tropical Fantasy/Warm Neighbours/Squirrel Hotel/Bunny Buns/Hot Party"	September 2, 2002
Mer-Emu appears in Untalkative Bunny's fantasy escape from a cold apartment; Emu fuels the fireplace with the clothing of neighbours; UB journeys to the centre of Squirrel Hotel; UB bakes a warm wardrobe; UB hosts a lame party.
15	2	"Goodbye TV/A Show for Everyone/Hoard All You Can/Real Life Drama/Friends Are Better than Cable"	September 6, 2002
Untalkative Bunny parts with beloved TV; UB pays a visit to neighbours with cable television; UB visits Squirrel and they watch Emu participating in the grocery game show 'Hoard All You Can'; UB walks in on the set of a soap drama; UB has friends and a film projector.
16	3	"Vegetarian Vigilantes/Marathon/Socks & Sandals/Yoga Master/Silent Skater"	September 9, 2002
Untalkative Bunny tries to jog out carrot cake gut; UB races as an international star athlete; UB shops at a health food store and gets hit in the wallet; UB takes up yoga and gets an inaccurate aura reading; UB takes up skating to impress girls.
17	4	"Mistress Rainbow/Teen Idol Concert Fun/Book Club/Fairy Tale Curse/Video Game Challenge"	September 13, 2002
Untalkative Bunny impressionably calls a psychic hotline; UB has teen idol concert fun; UB joins a severe book club; UB transports himself into medieval times while at the theatre; UB and Squirrel duel at the arcade on a game called 'Hoard All You Can.' Fantastic sound.
18	5	"What's that Noise?/Too Much Bunny/Secret Passageway/Beach Escape/Don't Play At Construction Sites"	September 16, 2002
Untalkative Bunny's upstairs neighbour Emu gets a specific kind of piano and reveals a sensitive side?; Emu redecorates. But is fickle; UB and Squirrel apparently explore a voyeur's (not-well-hidden) passageway; UB escapes jackhammers at the beach; UB doesn't heed the title's advice and gets encased in concrete.
19	6	"Friendly Together/Squirrel Family Reunion/Long Lost Llama/Singles Mixer/Phone-a-Friend"	September 20, 2002
Untalkative Bunny shares tea with a vacuously friendly puffball and feels alone in the world; UB joins Squirrel for classic family reunion games; With dial-up internet UB enlists a family finding service to introduce a meaningful connection to another living animal; UB mingles; UB puts Nazca lines on his carpet and gives Phone-a-Friend Enterprises a second chance.
20	7	"Eating With Manners/Opening Doors/Proper Grooming/Animal Obedience/The Arcade"	September 23, 2002
Untalkative Bunny, Squirrel, and Emu are in for a half-hour of being taught etiquette; UB acts out a domestic scene with a dollhouse before having a dream sequence about holding the door open for a walking carrot; The trio watch a visually humorous educational film about the importance of proper grooming, with potato chip crumbs meshed into their fur all the while; An episode peppered with speculate-able tidbits. Is UB really Bondage Wallaby? Also, Emu has a conditioned relationship with French soft cheeses; The trio say goodbye to Madomoiselle as she is escorted out of the arcade by security. 'Hoard All You Can' makes another appearance.
21	8	"The Last Nut/Mystery Friend/Psychoalas/Canape Killer/Concerned Marmot Surfers"	September 27, 2002
A peanut shortage brings squirrels around the world to a tall peanut butter sandwich; UB takes a spill from a runaway shopping cart; Emu swaps vacation homes with Australians; UB is invited to an evening of mystery; A wave sweeps UB into an underwater castle.
22	9	"Marmoteer/Charity Gala/Volunteer Round Up/Catch and Release/Art Museum"	October 28, 2002
UB is visited by a cute premise and a professional marmot model; UB and Squirrel attend a green space fundraiser that disappreciates their city apartments; UB and Squirrel sample volunteering opportunities; UB twinkles on toes before being misguidedly shuttled to the forest. (UB not only closes the front door but locks it in this episode!) When UB gets back home by bus, UB displays a montage of cultivation as UB hosts a social afternoon; UB takes a stringent afternoon at the art museum, but is turned onto conceptual art anyway.
23	10	"Smile-A-Matic 3000/Betty Sue/Sound and Smell/Vendor/Robotic Home Beauty Centre Deluxe"	November 1, 2002
Hits of disturbance; An animate doll appeals to UB's misassigned compassion. A face of resignment at right; UB has a fashion show on UB's ears and purchases a home sensory ambiance improvement device; UB exercises facial muscle groups before a ballet studio's vending machine arrives. An episode additionally revealing UB's subtle ballet passion and introducing Squirrel's gambling hobby; UB is made over by a monstrously fangled beauty machine.
24	11	"Medieval Fair/Organization Fair/Food Fair/Home Decor Fair/Franchise Fair"	November 4, 2002
Yellow Sir gets a friendship scroll at the fair and Beaver makes a lagoon appearance; UB finds in tidy boxes that orderliness cramps living; UB spices up at the food fair; Another lucky dumpster dive; UB is sold on fruit and vegetable paper product.
25	12	"Get a Lifestyle/Recreational City Hang Gliding/DJ Bun-E in the House/Bunny Lake/Larry Tunes"	January 15, 2003
UB gets a home make over; Squirrel presents a danger-cheating nature; UB has a velvety record collection and Emu has a pimped out ride; UB slides backstage on a performance of Swan Lake and dresses up; UB and Squirrel go to see a perplexingly cheesy lounge act.
26	13	"Paintball/Temptation Hat/Practical Joker/Dream Machine/Amazing Crockery"	January 16, 2003
Untalkative Bunny looks crafty in goggles; UB returns a Carmen Miranda apple; UB falls prey to a joke shop; UB jogs up to a tri-tone lemon machine; UB tries a hand at unappealing pratfallery.

=== Season 3 (2003) ===
No. overall	No. in season	Title	Original release date
27	1	"Lettuce Make Magic/Journey from the Bottom of the Hat/Buttercups and Daisies/Card on the Window/Long Term Levitation"	September 28, 2003
Watch Untalkative Bunny pull a rabbit out of a hat multiplied by heads of lettuce; UB journeys to the bottom of a hat; Classic price-less magician!; UB apprentices a card throwing trick; UB can't stop floating adorably.
28	2	"Cuckoo Crisis/Fur Ball/Late Phobia/Futuristic Art Encounter/Youth Therapy"	September 11, 2003
Untalkative Bunny has sewing skills and cute scenes of sleep-deprivation; UB gets a hairpiece; UB has to get to macramé class on time. Personally resonating alarm clocks setup; UB shares the apartment with ants and has a watermelon-induced hallucination; UB turns back the clock.
29	3	"Straight Down the Middle/Treasure Hunt/Hide & Seek/Soy Substitute Nut/Knitting Circle"	September 30, 2003
Untalkative Bunny and Squirrel take to the links; The UB gang competes in a scavenger hunt; UB corrals friends with the party game of hide and seek; UB worries about nut allergies on behalf of Squirrel; UB joins a stereotypically inane knitting circle.
30	4	"Go-Karting/Eye Test/Plant Pal/Garnish Me Beautiful/Squirrel Sitting"	October 1, 2003
Untalkative Bunny, Squirrel, and Emu race; UB gets prescription glasses; UB raises an ungrateful flytrap; Garnish overload; UB is a poor disciplinarian.
31	5	"Day Trip/Seaside Safety/Home of the Future/Hiccups/Superstition"	N/A
Untalkative Bunny travels the countryside by rail; UB and Squirrel star in an instructional episode with funnily square narration; UB gets a high-tech house-guest; The horror of a hugging machine rids UB's hiccups; UB runs through a list of superstitions.
32	6	"Horseback Heroes/Portrait of a Bunny/Secret Valentine/Fairground Prizes/Duckling Patrol"	October 3, 2003
Untalkative Bunny and Squirrel are city mama's boys; UB is misled by a portrait painter; Emu has a secret valentine; UB and Squirrel win a coconut at the midway; Ducklings hatch in UB's window box.
33	7	"That Certain Smile/Stress Busting/Lazybones/Chopsticks/Robot Dog"	October 4, 2003
Untalkative Bunny has a toothache; UB gets stressed; UB's chores stack up; UB and Squirrel dine out and rescue a cat with giant utensils; UB is a cat person.
34	8	"Chain Letters/The Missing Piece/Goldibunny/Superbunny/Aromatherapy Mud Wrap"	October 5, 2003
Untalkative Bunny gets a life-tip from the postman; UB scouts the house for the central piece of a jigsaw puzzle; UB visits the Bear Brothers department store; UB and Squirrel rescue citizens from domestic unhandiness; UB and Disco Chick have an introductory pass at the spa.
35	9	"Urban Gardener/Window Cleaner/Let There Be Light/Piano Lesson/Double Mocha"	September 1, 2003
Untalkative Bunny grows an oasis in the city; The most tickling snapshot of Emu!; UB upgrades from a desk lamp to the hypnotic bulbs of a discothèque; More player piano action; UB breaks away from Starbucks.
36	10	"Gotta Dance/Cafe Society/Cool Cat Jazz Bunny/Museum Watchmen/Shhhhhh!"	September 2, 2003
Untalkative Bunny and Squirrel have grace in their feet; Poet Cat passes Mellow Yellow some ketchup; Poet Cat hosts an evening party; UB and Squirrel take a shift as night watchmen; UB is shushed out of the library.
37	11	"Hotel Fabuloso/Coffee Quitters/Bunny Catches a Cold/Sticker Mania/Rare Stick Insect"	September 3, 2003
Untalkative Bunny and gang have a towel snapping frenzy; UB sits in on a coffee quitting club; UB touches germs in a public washroom; Naked Guy and Small Red Guy get into stickers; A rare stick insect nests on UB's television.
38	12	"Taxi Ride/Memories of the Forest/Passing the Puck/Squirrel's Revenge Driving School/Vertigo"	September 5, 2003
Untalkative Bunny gets in the cab of a discomforting driver; UB and Squirrel tap a maple syrup bottle; UB passes a puck; UB has a stint as a driving instructor; UB tours the CN Tower.
39	13	"Hockey Fanatic/Squirrel's New Friend/Musical Ride/Laundromat Life/Split Personality"	September 6, 2003
Untalkative Bunny and Beaver attend a hockey game; UB renews a licence to drive; UB and Llama tour a local attraction; UB interacts with humans at the laundromat; UB witnesses opposite personalities of Emu.
