= The Game Awards 2022 =

American video game awards

- Date: December 8, 2022
- Venue: Microsoft Theater, Los Angeles
- Country: United States
- Hosted by: Geoff Keighley
- Preshow host: Sydnee Goodman

Highlights
- Most awards: God of War Ragnarök (6)
- Most nominations: God of War Ragnarök (11)
- Game of the Year: Elden Ring
- Website: thegameawards.com

Online coverage
- Runtime: 3 hours
- Viewership: 103 million
- Produced by: Geoff Keighley; Kimmie Kim
- Directed by: Richard Preuss

The Game Awards 2022 was an award show that honored the best video games of 2022. The event was hosted by Geoff Keighley, creator and producer of The Game Awards, and was held to an invited audience at the Microsoft Theater in Los Angeles on December 8, 2022. The preshow ceremony was hosted by Sydnee Goodman. The event was live streamed across more than 40 digital platforms, alongside an additional IMAX experience. It featured musical performances from Halsey, Hozier, and Bear McCreary, and presentations from celebrity guests, including Reggie Fils-Aimé, Al Pacino, Pedro Pascal, Bella Ramsey, and Ken and Roberta Williams. The show introduced a new Best Adaptation award for media adapted from video games.

God of War Ragnarök led the show with eleven nominations (Note: God of War Ragnarök's eleven nominations tied with 2020's The Last of Us Part II for the most in the show's history.) and six awards, winning Best Narrative and Best Action/Adventure Game, as well as Best Performance for Christopher Judge's performance as Kratos and Best Score and Music for composer McCreary. Elden Ring won Game of the Year, Best Game Direction, and Best Role Playing Game. Several games were announced during the show, including Crash Team Rumble, Death Stranding 2, and Hades II. The event received media attention after an individual sneaked on stage and made a short speech towards the event's end. The show was viewed by over 103 million streams, the most in its history to date. (Note: The viewership record was beaten in 2023 with 118 million streams.) Reviews for the ceremony were mixed, with praise for announcements and speeches but criticism directed at the focus on marketing over awards and lack of indie game representation.

== Background ==
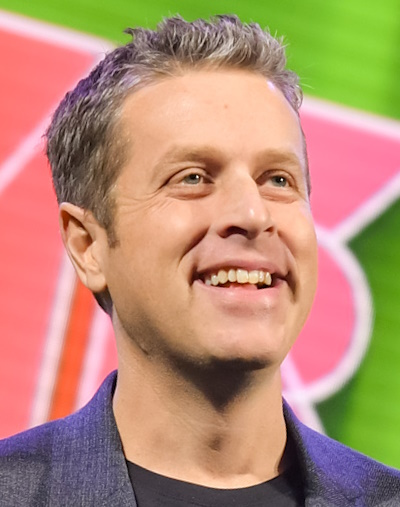
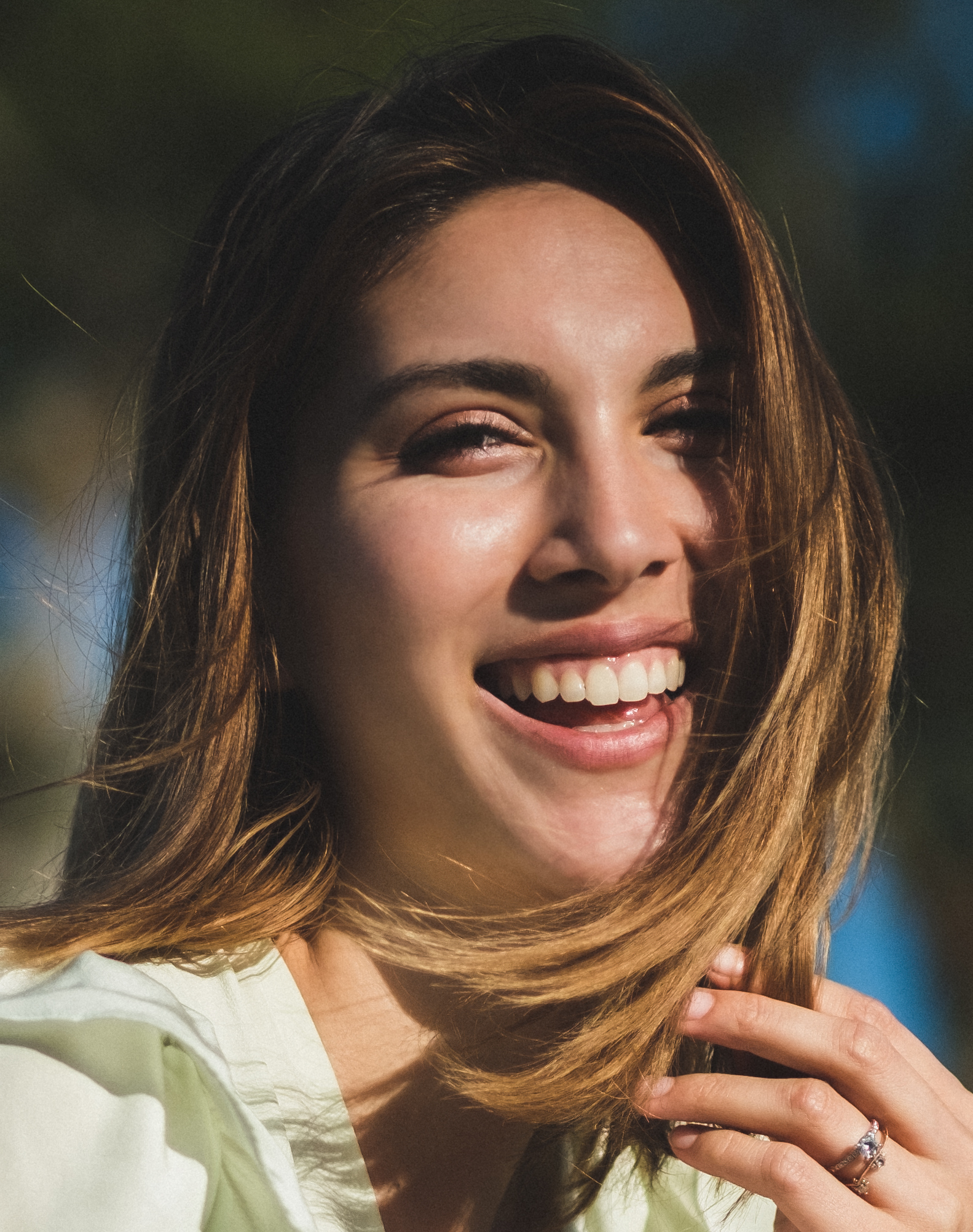
As with previous iterations of The Game Awards, Geoff Keighley (left) hosted the main show while Sydnee Goodman (right) hosted the preshow.

As with previous iterations of The Game Awards, the 2022 show was hosted and produced by Canadian games journalist Geoff Keighley. He returned as an executive producer alongside Kimmie Kim, and Richard Preuss and LeRoy Bennett returned as director and creative director, respectively. Sydnee Goodman returned as host of the 30-minute preshow, rebranded as the Opening Act. The presentation took place at the Microsoft Theater in Los Angeles on December 8, 2022, and was live streamed across more than 40 online platforms and social media services, including Facebook, TikTok, Twitch, Twitter, and YouTube, as well as introducing Instagram Live worldwide and partnering with Tiki in India. For the first time since 2019 due to the COVID-19 pandemic, the show opened its attendance to the public, allowing around 1,000 attendants, though overall attendance was limited to a couple thousand to avoid further restrictions. Kim expected more international guests, particularly from Japan, due to the ease of travel restrictions. Public tickets became available for purchase on November 1, though the show remained subject to change pending health and safety guidelines changes due to COVID-19 in California.

Keighley wanted the show to be more cinematic, opting for a shorter duration than previous years—around 2.5 hours—in response to viewer feedback; he felt viewers encountered fatigue with previous shows and worked to streamline by cutting some content. Keighley struggled with the balance between awards and announcements, noting that industry members largely value the former whereas about 75 percent of the community prefer the latter. The show partnered with IMAX to create The Game Awards: The IMAX Experience, a live community event allowing participation worldwide and featuring an exclusive gameplay sequence of the upcoming game Dead Space; it was broadcast in 40 locations in the United States and Canada, where tickets became available on November 16. During the show, Valve gave away one Steam Deck each minute to eligible viewers on Steam in Canada, the European Union, United Kingdom, and United States. Eligible Twitch viewers received rewards allowing them to redeem Rogue Legacy on the Epic Games Store, and in-game items such as a Keighley mask in Among Us, Twitch emote skins in Cult of the Lamb, and Kait Diaz costume in Fall Guys.

The Game Awards 2022 was the third show to feature Future Class, a list of 50 individuals from across the video game industry who best represent its future; the initiative was led by its director Emily Bouchoc and internal communications manager Jessie Kuse. More than 2,500 Future Class nominations were accepted in September and October and the list was announced on December 5, featuring individuals like BURA co-founder Camila Gormaz, The Game Bakers co-founder Audrey Leprince, and Global Game Jam president Dr. JC Lau. The 2022 show added an award for Best Adaptation, recognizing media adapted from video games, including films, television shows, novels, comic books, and podcasts. Keighley felt the popularization of adaptations led to them passing the minimum threshold of nominees and it was time to honor them. The Game Awards partnered with Discord to present Best Community Support and introduce voting and guest events in the show's Discord server.

=== Announcements ===
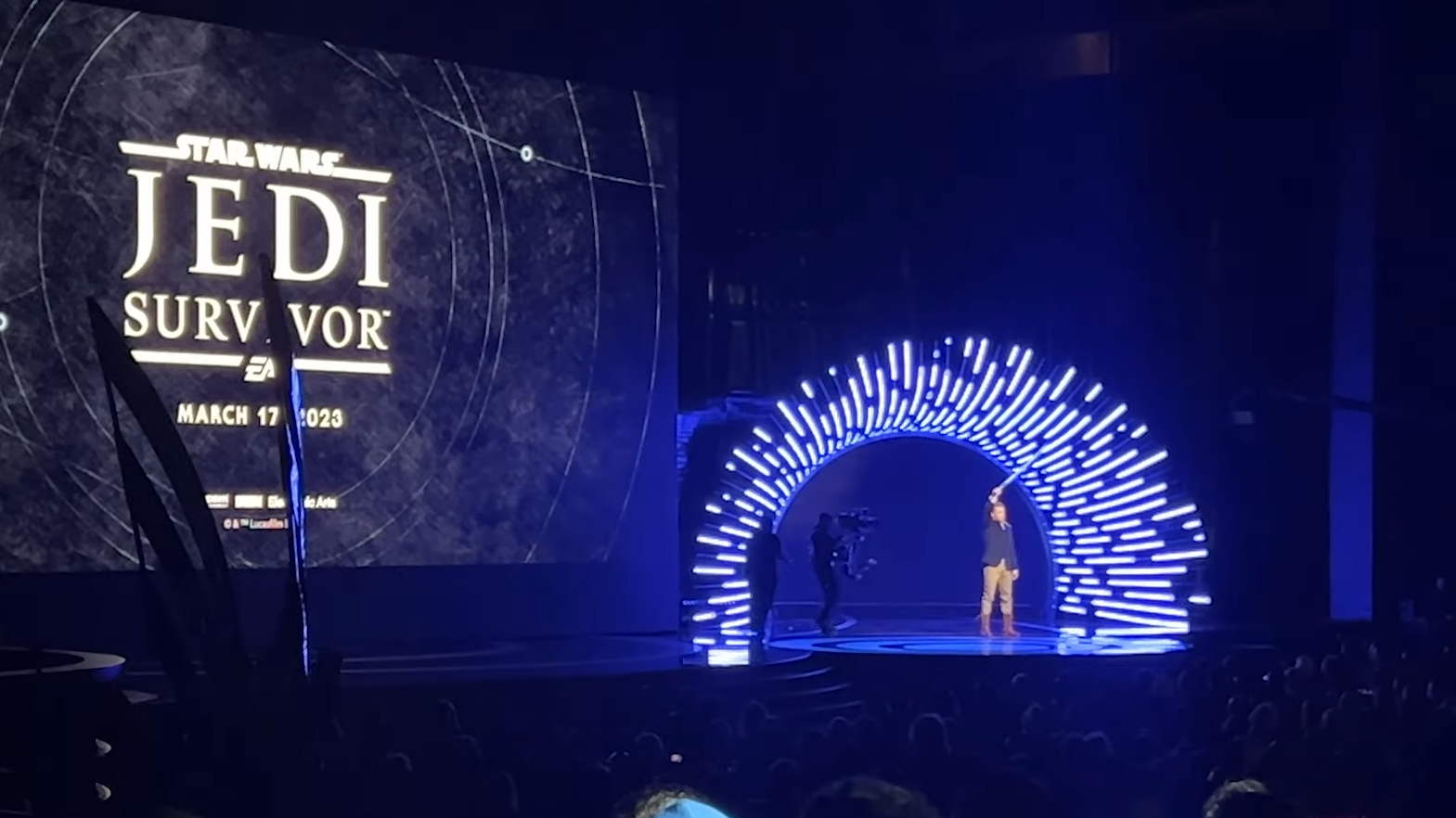
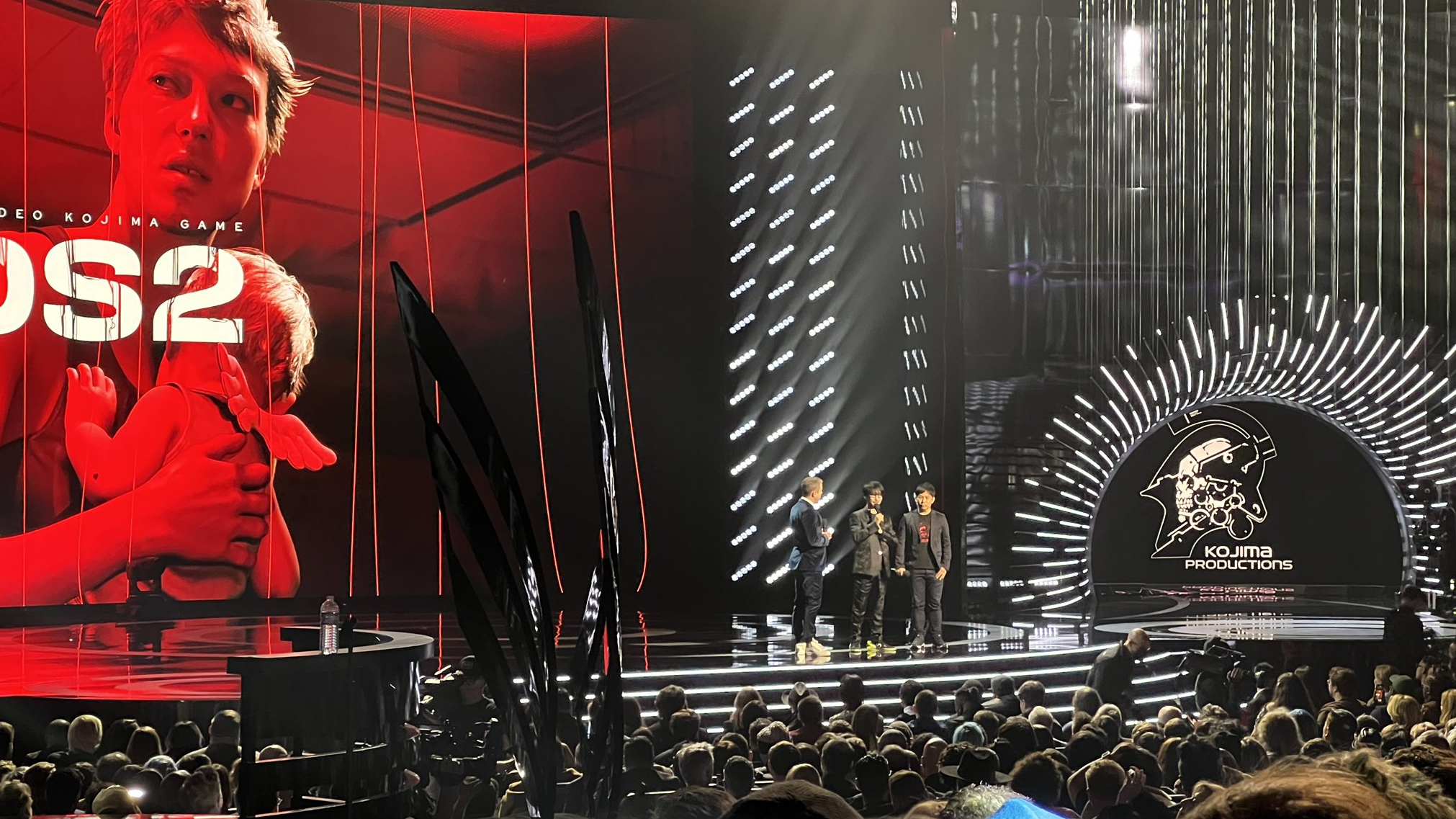
Announcements made during the show included the gameplay trailer for Star Wars Jedi: Survivor (top) and the reveal trailer for Death Stranding 2 (bottom).

Keighley estimated the show involved over 50 games, about 30 to 40 of which are announced games showing new content. The first clip of The Super Mario Bros. Movie was revealed during the show. Announcements on released and upcoming games were made for:

- Among Us
- Baldur's Gate III
- Blood Bowl 3
- Blue Protocol
- Call of Duty: Modern Warfare II
- Colossal Cave 3D Adventure
- Company of Heroes 3
- Cyberpunk 2077
- Dead Cells
- Destiny 2: Lightfall
- Diablo IV
- Dune: Awakening
- Final Fantasy XVI
- Fire Emblem Engage
- Forspoken
- Genshin Impact
- Horizon Call of the Mountain
- Horizon Forbidden West
- Meet Your Maker
- Nightingale
- Party Animals
- Replaced
- Returnal
- Rocket League
- Sky: Children of the Light
- Star Wars Jedi: Survivor
- Street Fighter 6
- Suicide Squad: Kill the Justice League
- Tekken 8
- The Last of Us Part I
- The Lords of the Fallen
- Vampire Survivors
- Viewfinder
- Warhammer 40,000: Space Marine 2
- Wild Hearts

New games announced included:

- After Us
- Armored Core VI: Fires of Rubicon
- Banishers: Ghosts of New Eden
- Bayonetta Origins: Cereza and the Lost Demon
- Behemoth VR
- Crash Team Rumble
- Crime Boss: Rockay City
- Death Stranding 2
- Earthblade
- Hades II
- Hellboy Web of Wyrd
- Immortals of Aveum
- Judas
- Post Trauma
- Remnant 2
- Transformers Reactivate
- Valiant Hearts: Coming Home
- Wayfinder

Several fans and journalists expressed frustration by the lack of Xbox announcements during the event; IGN's Ryan McCaffrey called it "a slap in the face to players". Some theorized the company's absence may be due to the Federal Trade Commission announcing it would attempt to block Microsoft's acquisition of Activision Blizzard in the morning of the show, though journalists noted it was likely unrelated. Aaron Greenberg, vice president of Xbox Games Marketing, responded to the complaints by stating the company had announcements planned for 2023.

=== Stage interruption ===
After Elden Ring was announced as the Game of the Year winner, an audience member, Matan Even, followed the developers on stage and waited while they gave their speech. As music began to play after director Hidetaka Miyazaki's speech, Even approached the microphone and said "I want to thank everybody and say I think I want to nominate [sic] this award to my Reformed Orthodox [sic] (Note: Reform Jews and Orthodox Jews are distinct groups. Even claimed to name both groups to avoid secluding one.) rabbi Bill Clinton. [sic] (Note: Bill Clinton is a Baptist.) Thank you, everybody." in a thick Israeli accent. During the 13-second speech, The Washington Post observed Keighley waving for security; security escorted Even off stage and Keighley ended the show as planned. Minutes later, Keighley said Even had been arrested; the Los Angeles Police Department later said no arrest was made but Even had been detained and questioned at the venue by on-site police and security before being transported to a local police station. The event received immediate attention by news outlets and on social media; a model of Clinton was modded into Elden Ring. Several journalists criticized the ambush and noted it presented potential danger to the Elden Ring developers and overshadowed their award. The Game Awards digitally removed Even when sharing an image of Miyazaki's speech on Twitter.

Subsequent reports identified Even as a 15-year-old who had premeditated the stunt with his friends. Reports emerged that he had a history of publicly expressing support for the Hong Kong protests at NBA matches and BlizzCon in 2019 and had appeared twice on InfoWars, an American far-right talk show, whose host Owen Shroyer described him as "one of the young stars of the conservative movement". He spoke without an Israeli accent during these appearances. Even's InfoWars appearance and choice of shoewear at The Game Awards—Adidas Yeezy by Kanye West, who had recently made multiple antisemitic public statements—led to speculation that his interruption was promoting antisemitic tropes. In subsequent interviews, he refused to break character but claimed to be Jewish, said to have recently attained an Israeli accent, denied being a fan of InfoWars, and disagreed with West's political views. He claimed his statement "wasn't intended to be a dog whistle for far-right conspiracies". Journalists described him as a "troll", "prankster", and "shitposter"; Bloomberg News's Jason Schreier said Even was "almost certainly a Jewish prankster" based on his understanding of Hebrew. Digital Trends's Giovanni Colantonio found the moment a poetic representation of the show itself: "a fan overshadowing the people who we were supposed to be celebrating". The incident led to increased security the following year.

== Winners and nominees ==
Nominees were announced on November 14, 2022. Any game released for public consumption on or before November 18, 2022, was eligible for consideration. The nominees were compiled by a jury panel composed of members from over 100 media outlets globally, including specialized juries for accessibility, adaptation, and esports awards: 117 media outlets for general nominees, 18 jury members for accessibility, and 16 outlets for esports. Winners were determined between the jury (90 percent) and public voting (10 percent); the latter was held via the official website and Discord server (Note: In China, fan voting is held via Bilibili.) until December 7. According to Keighley, public voting within the first 24 hours increased 42 percent compared to The Game Awards 2021; within the first week, 35 million votes had been submitted, more than double in the same period the previous year and exceeding 2021's total three-week count. When the polls closed, more than 55 million votes had been submitted, an increase of 138 percent over 2021. Keighley felt the competition was particularly rife between the two "flagship games", Elden Ring and God of War Ragnarök. Christopher Judge's Best Performance acceptance speech ran for 7 minutes and 59 seconds, exceeding the longest Oscar speech (set in 1943 by Greer Garson) by two-and-a-half minutes.

Keighley jokingly referenced accusations of bots when awarding Genshin Impact Players' Voice.

The exception to the jury-voted awards was Players' Voice, fully nominated and voted-on by the public; the winner was determined after three rounds of voting, which ran from November 28 to December 7. The final two rounds led to accusations of bribery and bots, as some users suspected Genshin Impact players were voting in hopes of receiving in-game currency and erroneously suggested the game had offered some to players who voted for it, (Note: Genshin Impact previously distributed in-game currency to all players after winning Best Mobile Game at the Game Awards 2021 and Grand Prize at the PlayStation Partner Awards 2022, but did not explicitly suggest it would do the same after the Game Awards 2022.) while some Genshin Impact players accused Sonic Frontiers fans of using bots to vote. Journalists reported a lack of credible evidence of bots or bribery, and Keighley felt bots were uninvolved but said his team would investigate. Discourse surrounding voting became adversarial, with fandoms attacking each other and the subreddit r/SonicTheHedgehog restricting posts about the award. Keighley jokingly referenced bot accusations when crowning Genshin Impact the winner during the show, and later said the discourse reaffirmed the decision to avoid fully-public voting for main categories. PC Gamer's Mollie Taylor noticed adversarial discourse remained on both sides after the event. Genshin Impact distributed in-game currency to all players after its win.

=== Awards ===
Winners are listed first, highlighted in boldface, and indicated with a double dagger (‡).

==== Video games and media ====
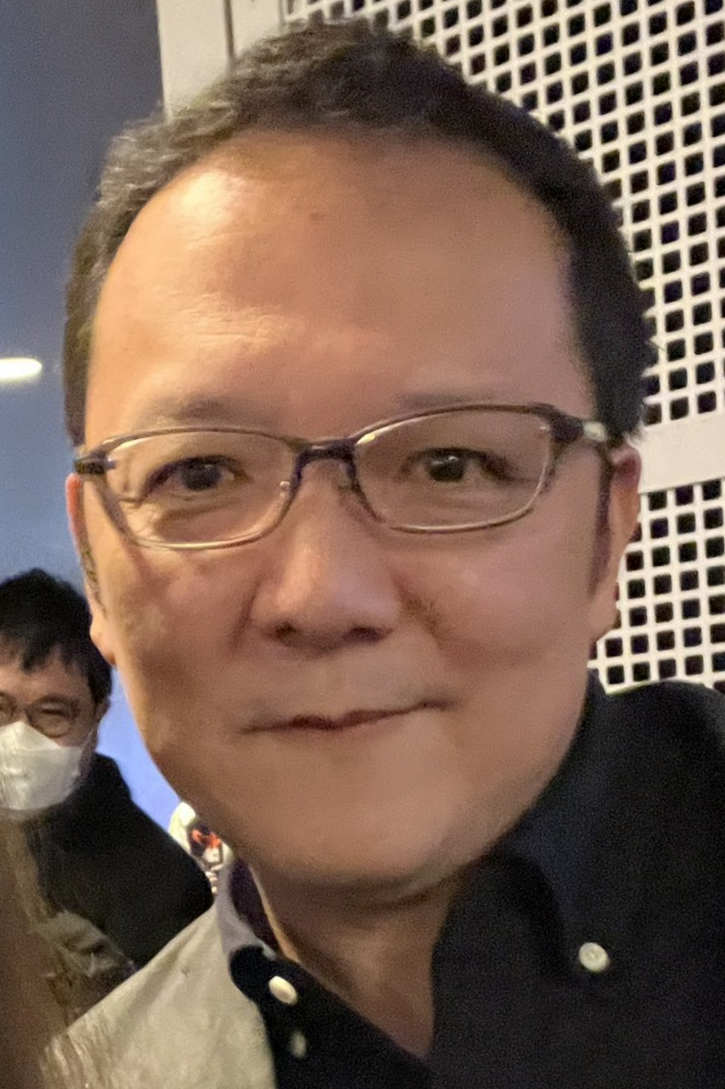
Hidetaka Miyazaki accepted Game of the Year and Best Game Direction for Elden Ring.

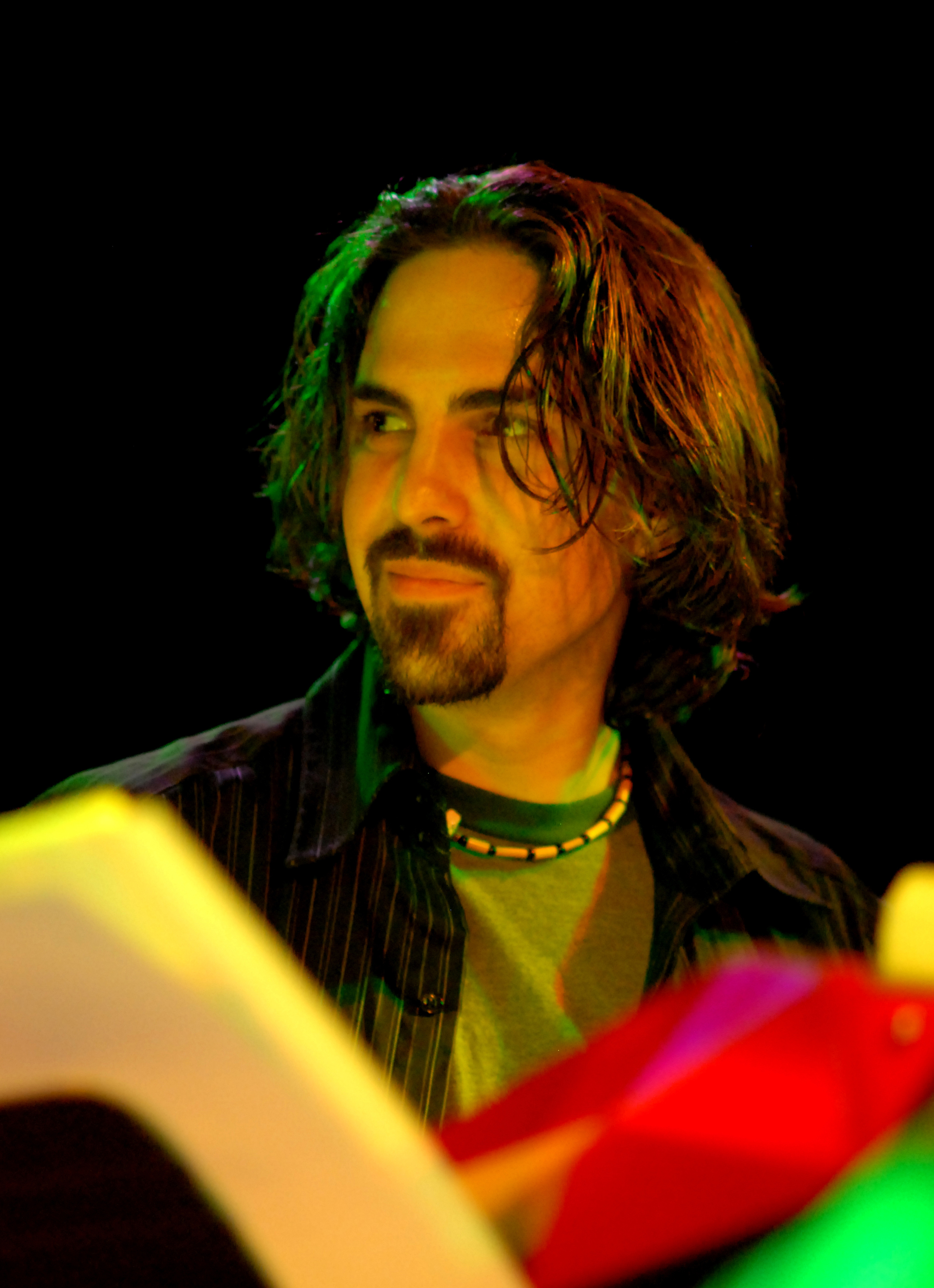
Bear McCreary won Best Score and Music for God of War Ragnarök.

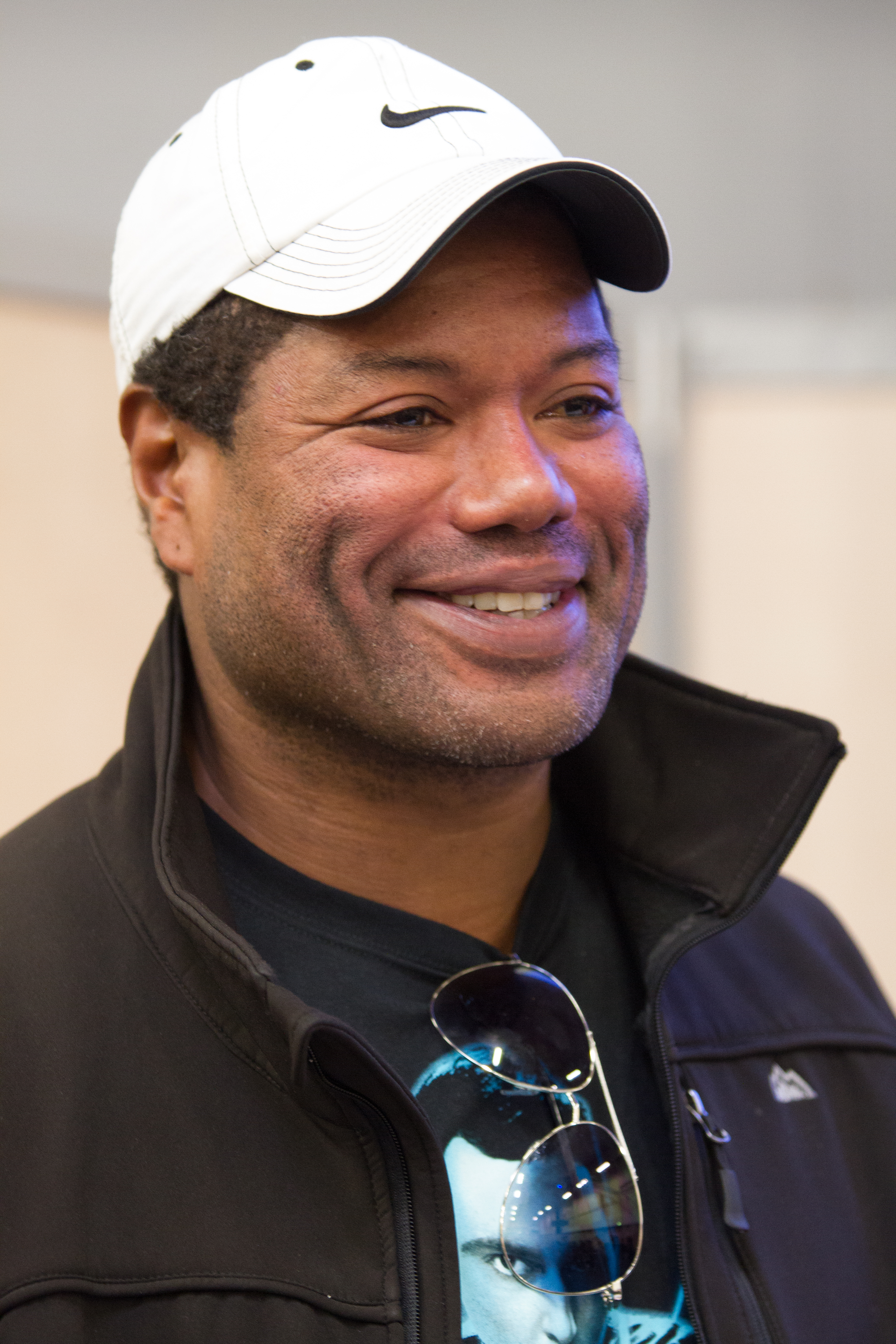
Christopher Judge won Best Performance for his role as Kratos in God of War Ragnarök.

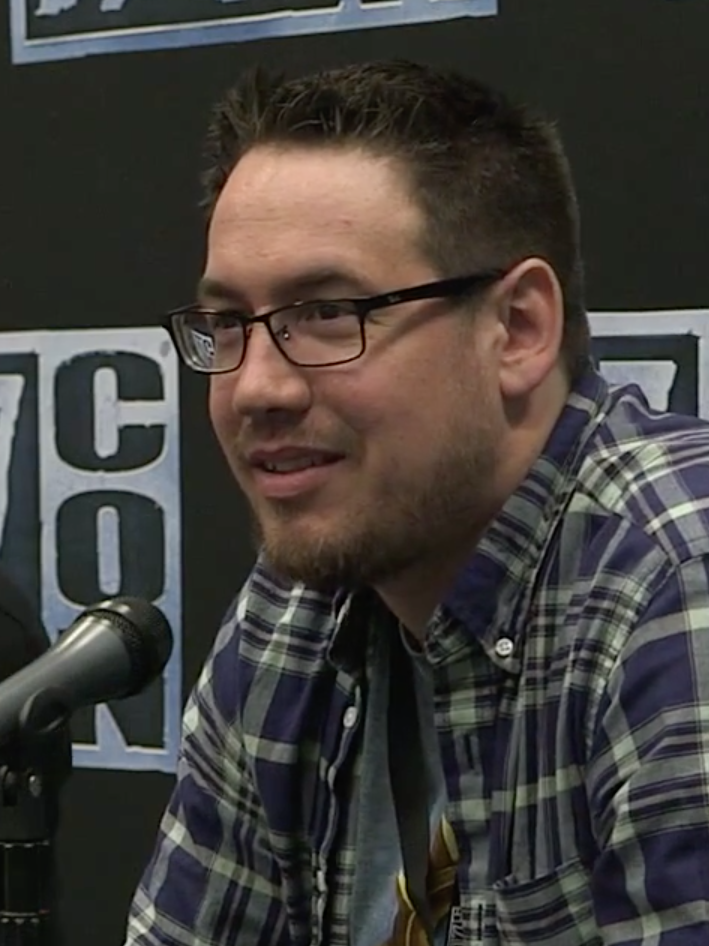
Ben Brode accepted Best Mobile Game for Marvel Snap.

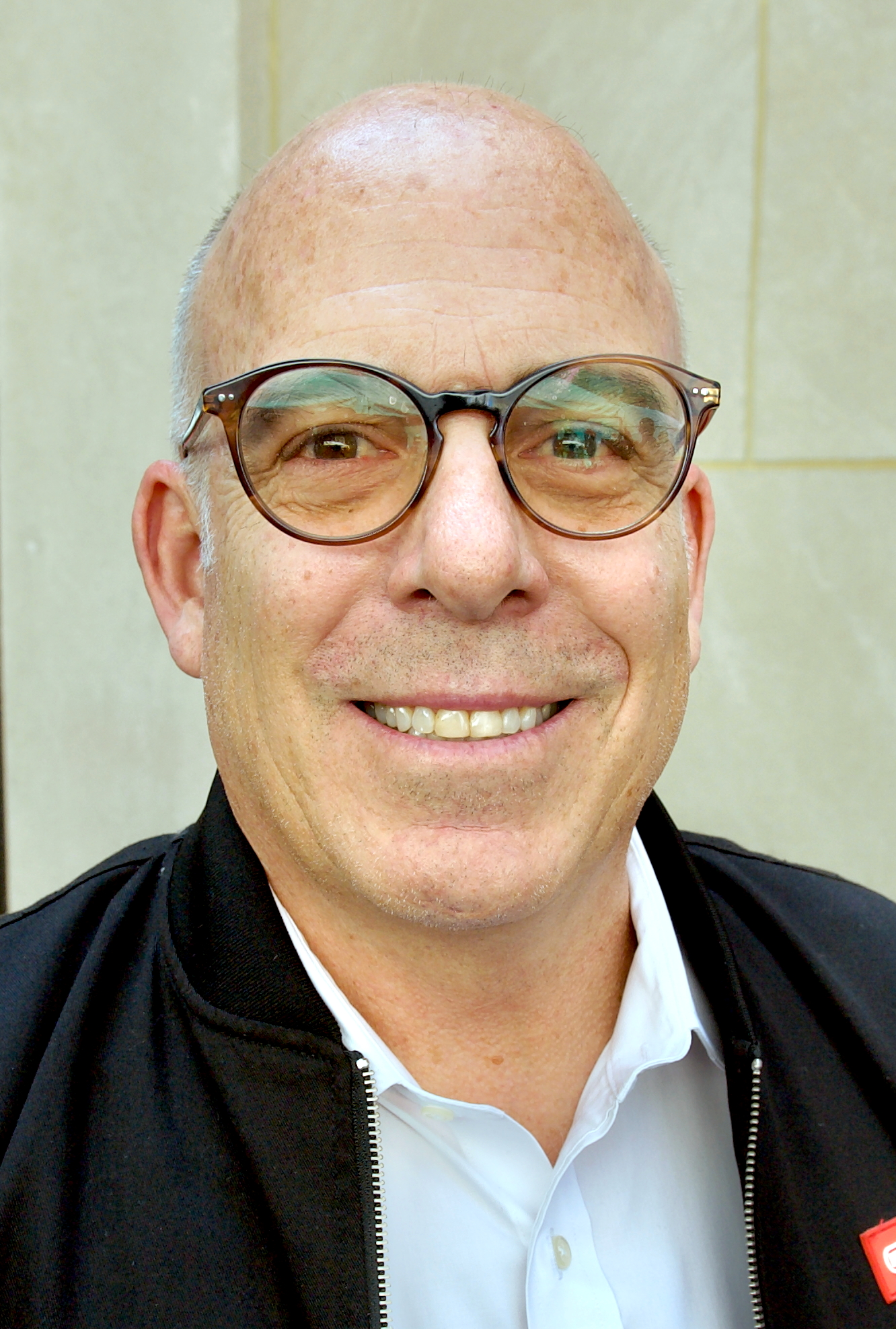
Doug Bowser accepted Best Action Game for Bayonetta 3 and Best Family Game for Kirby and the Forgotten Land.

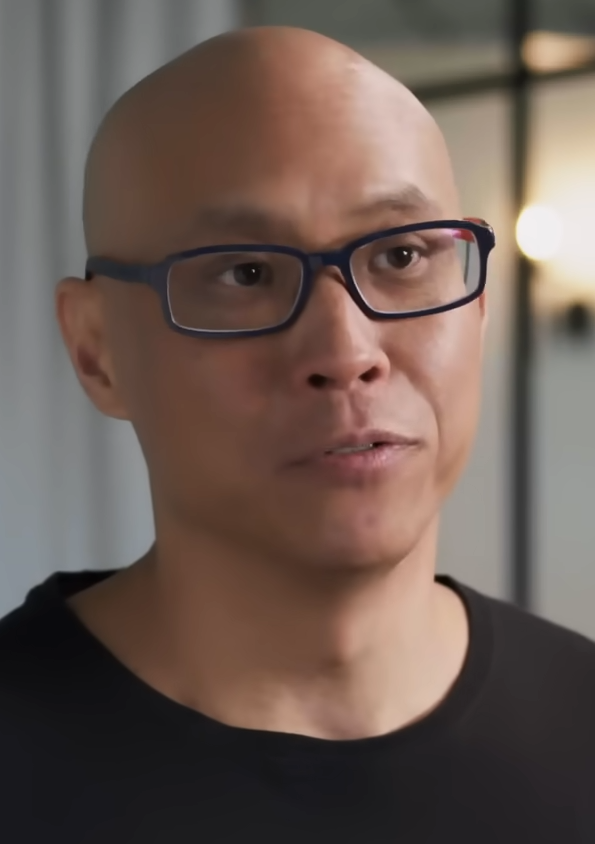
Tony Huynh accepted Best Fighting Game for MultiVersus.

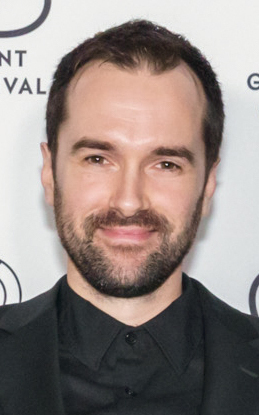
Swann Martin-Raget accepted Best Debut Indie Game for Stray.

Game of the Year	Best Game Direction
**Elden Ring – FromSoftware / Bandai Namco Entertainment**‡; A Plague Tale: Requiem – Asobo Studio / Focus Entertainment; God of War Ragnarök – Santa Monica Studio / Sony Interactive Entertainment; Horizon Forbidden West – Guerrilla Games / Sony Interactive Entertainment; Stray – BlueTwelve Studio / Annapurna Interactive; Xenoblade Chronicles 3 – Monolith Soft / Nintendo	**Elden Ring – FromSoftware / Bandai Namco Entertainment**‡; God of War Ragnarök – Santa Monica Studio / Sony Interactive Entertainment; Horizon Forbidden West – Guerrilla Games / Sony Interactive Entertainment; Immortality – Sam Barlow / Half Mermaid Productions; Stray – BlueTwelve Studio / Annapurna Interactive
Best Narrative	Best Art Direction
**God of War Ragnarök – Santa Monica Studio / Sony Interactive Entertainment**‡; A Plague Tale: Requiem – Asobo Studio / Focus Entertainment; Elden Ring – FromSoftware / Bandai Namco Entertainment; Horizon Forbidden West – Guerrilla Games / Sony Interactive Entertainment; Immortality – Sam Barlow / Half Mermaid Productions	**Elden Ring – FromSoftware / Bandai Namco Entertainment**‡; God of War Ragnarök – Santa Monica Studio / Sony Interactive Entertainment; Horizon Forbidden West – Guerrilla Games / Sony Interactive Entertainment; Scorn – Ebb Software / Kepler Interactive; Stray – BlueTwelve Studio / Annapurna Interactive
Best Score and Music	Best Audio Design
**God of War Ragnarök – Bear McCreary**‡; A Plague Tale: Requiem – Olivier Deriviere; Elden Ring – Tsukasa Saitoh; Metal: Hellsinger – Two Feathers; Xenoblade Chronicles 3 – Yasunori Mitsuda	**God of War Ragnarök – Santa Monica Studio / Sony Interactive Entertainment**‡; Call of Duty: Modern Warfare II – Infinity Ward / Activision; Elden Ring – FromSoftware / Bandai Namco Entertainment; Gran Turismo 7 – Polyphony Digital / Sony Interactive Entertainment; Horizon Forbidden West – Guerrilla Games / Sony Interactive Entertainment
Best Performance	Games for Impact
**Christopher Judge as Kratos – God of War Ragnarök**‡; Ashly Burch as Aloy – Horizon Forbidden West; Manon Gage as Marissa Marcel – Immortality; Charlotte McBurney as Amicia de Rune – A Plague Tale: Requiem; Sunny Suljic as Atreus – God of War Ragnarök	**As Dusk Falls – Interior Night / Xbox Game Studios**‡; A Memoir Blue – Cloisters Interactive / Annapurna Interactive; Citizen Sleeper – Jump Over the Age / Fellow Traveller; Endling: Extinction is Forever – Herobeat Studios / HandyGames; Hindsight – Joel McDonald / Annapurna Interactive; I Was a Teenage Exocolonist – Northway Games / Finji
Best Ongoing Game	Best Independent Game
**Final Fantasy XIV – Square Enix**‡; Apex Legends – Respawn Entertainment / Electronic Arts; Destiny 2: The Witch Queen – Bungie; Fortnite – Epic Games; Genshin Impact – miHoYo	**Stray – BlueTwelve Studio / Annapurna Interactive**‡; Cult of the Lamb – Massive Monster / Devolver Digital; Neon White – Angel Matrix / Annapurna Interactive; Sifu – Sloclap; Tunic – Andrew Shouldice / Finji
Best Mobile Game	Best Community Support (Note: Presented in conjunction with Discord)
**Marvel Snap – Second Dinner / Nuverse**‡; Apex Legends Mobile – Respawn Entertainment / Electronic Arts; Diablo Immortal – NetEase / Blizzard Entertainment; Genshin Impact – miHoYo; Tower of Fantasy – Hotta Studio / Level Infinite	**Final Fantasy XIV – Square Enix**‡; Apex Legends – Respawn Entertainment / Electronic Arts; Destiny 2: The Witch Queen – Bungie; Fortnite – Epic Games; No Man's Sky – Hello Games
Best VR / AR Game	Innovation in Accessibility
**Moss: Book II – Polyarc**‡; After the Fall – Vertigo Games; Among Us VR – Innersloth; Bonelab – Stress Level Zero; Red Matter 2 – Vertical Robot	**God of War Ragnarök – Santa Monica Studio / Sony Interactive Entertainment**‡; As Dusk Falls – Interior Night / Xbox Game Studios; Return to Monkey Island – Terrible Toybox, Lucasfilm Games / Devolver Digital; The Last of Us Part I – Naughty Dog / Sony Interactive Entertainment; The Quarry – Supermassive Games / 2K
Best Action Game	Best Action/Adventure Game
**Bayonetta 3 – PlatinumGames / Nintendo**‡; Call of Duty: Modern Warfare II – Infinity Ward / Activision; Neon White – Angel Matrix / Annapurna Interactive; Sifu – Sloclap; Teenage Mutant Ninja Turtles: Shredder's Revenge – Tribute Games / Dotemu	**God of War Ragnarök – Santa Monica Studio / Sony Interactive Entertainment**‡; A Plague Tale: Requiem – Asobo Studio / Focus Entertainment; Horizon Forbidden West – Guerrilla Games / Sony Interactive Entertainment; Stray – BlueTwelve Studio / Annapurna Interactive; Tunic – Andrew Shouldice / Finji
Best Role Playing Game	Best Fighting Game
**Elden Ring – FromSoftware / Bandai Namco Entertainment**‡; Live a Live – Square Enix / Nintendo; Pokémon Legends: Arceus – Game Freak / The Pokémon Company, Nintendo; Triangle Strategy – Artdink / Square Enix; Xenoblade Chronicles 3 – Monolith Soft / Nintendo	**MultiVersus – Player First Games / Warner Bros. Interactive Entertainment**‡; DNF Duel – Arc System Works, Eighting, Neople / Nexon; JoJo's Bizarre Adventure: All Star Battle R – CyberConnect2 / Bandai Namco Entertainment; The King of Fighters XV – SNK; Sifu – Sloclap
Best Family Game	Best Sports/Racing Game
**Kirby and the Forgotten Land – HAL Laboratory / Nintendo**‡; Lego Star Wars: The Skywalker Saga – Traveller's Tales / Warner Bros. Interactive Entertainment; Mario + Rabbids Sparks of Hope – Ubisoft Milan, Ubisoft Paris / Ubisoft; Nintendo Switch Sports – Nintendo EPD / Nintendo; Splatoon 3 – Nintendo EPD / Nintendo	**Gran Turismo 7 – Polyphony Digital / Sony Interactive Entertainment**‡; F1 22 – Codemasters / EA Sports; FIFA 23 – EA Vancouver, EA Romania / EA Sports; NBA 2K23 – Visual Concepts / 2K Sports; OlliOlli World – Roll7 / Private Division
Best Sim/Strategy Game	Best Multiplayer Game
**Mario + Rabbids Sparks of Hope – Ubisoft Milan, Ubisoft Paris / Ubisoft**‡; Dune: Spice Wars – Shiro Games / Funcom; Total War: Warhammer III – Creative Assembly / Sega; Two Point Campus – Two Point Studios / Sega; Victoria 3 – Paradox Development Studio / Paradox Interactive	**Splatoon 3 – Nintendo EPD / Nintendo**‡; Call of Duty: Modern Warfare II – Infinity Ward / Activision; MultiVersus – Player First Games / Warner Bros. Interactive Entertainment; Overwatch 2 – Blizzard Entertainment; Teenage Mutant Ninja Turtles: Shredder's Revenge – Tribute Games / Dotemu
Best Debut Indie Game	Most Anticipated Game
**Stray – BlueTwelve Studio / Annapurna Interactive**‡; Neon White – Angel Matrix / Annapurna Interactive; Norco – Geography of Robots / Raw Fury; Tunic – Andrew Shouldice / Finji; Vampire Survivors – Luca Galante	**The Legend of Zelda: Tears of the Kingdom – Nintendo EPD / Nintendo**‡; Final Fantasy XVI – Square Enix Creative Business Unit III / Square Enix; Hogwarts Legacy – Avalanche Software / Warner Bros. Interactive Entertainment; Resident Evil 4 – Capcom; Starfield – Bethesda Game Studios / Bethesda Softworks
Best Adaptation (Note: Awarded to media based on video games)	Players' Voice (Note: 100 percent public-voted award with a three-round nomination process that began with 30 games)
**Arcane (animated series) – Fortiche, Riot Games / Netflix; based on League of Legends by Riot Games**‡; Cyberpunk: Edgerunners (anime series) – Studio Trigger, CD Projekt / Netflix; based on Cyberpunk 2077 by CD Projekt; The Cuphead Show! (animated series) – Studio MDHR, King Features Syndicate / Netflix; based on Cuphead by Studio MDHR; Sonic the Hedgehog 2 (film) – Sega Sammy Group / Paramount Pictures; based on Sonic the Hedgehog by Sega; Uncharted (film) – PlayStation Productions / Sony Pictures Releasing; based on Uncharted by Sony Interactive Entertainment	**Genshin Impact – miHoYo**‡; Elden Ring – FromSoftware / Bandai Namco Entertainment; God of War Ragnarök – Santa Monica Studio / Sony Interactive Entertainment; Sonic Frontiers – Sonic Team / Sega; Stray – BlueTwelve Studio / Annapurna Interactive

==== Esports and creators ====
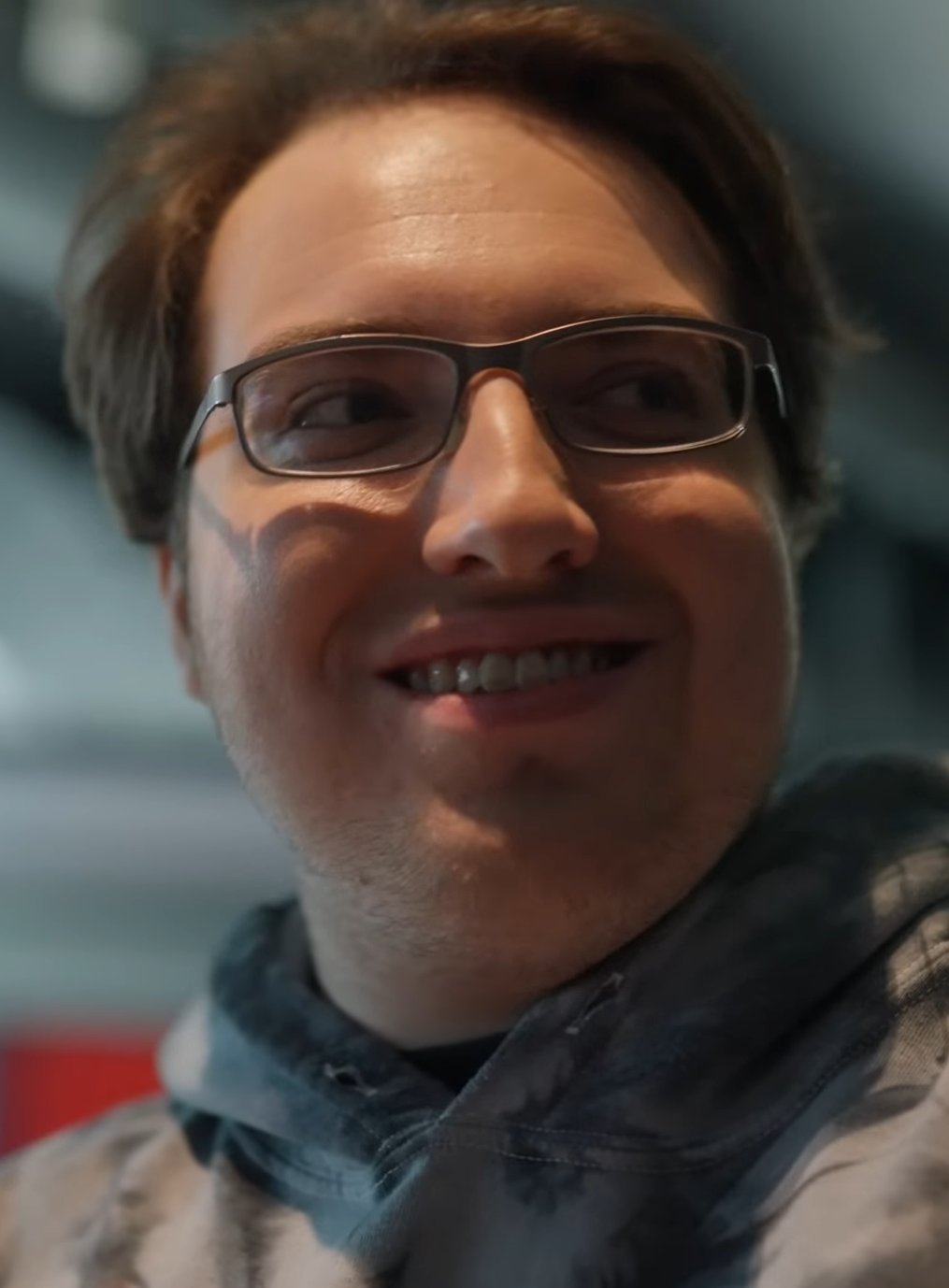
Jaccob "yay" Whiteaker won Best Esports Athlete.

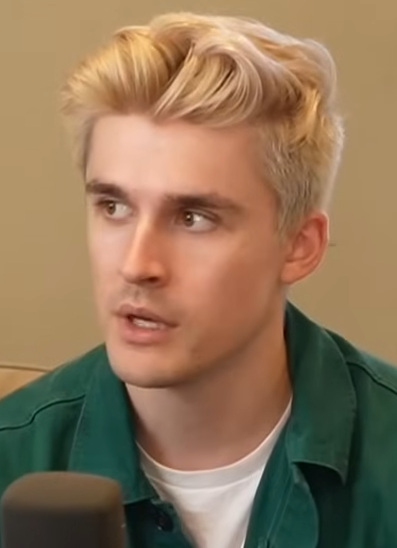
Ludwig Ahgren won Content Creator of the Year.

Best Esports Game	Best Esports Athlete
**Valorant – Riot Games**‡; Counter-Strike: Global Offensive – Valve; Dota 2 – Valve; League of Legends – Riot Games; Rocket League – Psyonix	**Jaccob "yay" Whiteaker (OpTic Gaming, Valorant)**‡; Jeong "Chovy" Ji-hoon (Gen.G, League of Legends); Lee "Faker" Sang-hyeok (T1, League of Legends); Finn "karrigan" Andersen (FaZe Clan, Counter-Strike: Global Offensive); Oleksandr "s1mple" Kostyliev (Natus Vincere, Counter-Strike: Global Offensive)
Best Esports Team	Best Esports Coach
**LOUD (Valorant)**‡; DarkZero Esports (Apex Legends); FaZe Clan (Counter-Strike: Global Offensive); Gen.G (League of Legends); Los Angeles Thieves (Call of Duty)	**Matheus "bzkA" Tarasconi (LOUD, Valorant)**‡; Andrii "B1ad3" Horodenskyi (Natus Vincere, Counter-Strike: Global Offensive); Erik "d00mbr0s" Sandgren (FunPlus Phoenix, Valorant); Robert "RobbaN" Dahlström (FaZe Clan, Counter-Strike: Global Offensive); Go "Score" Dong-bin (Gen.G, League of Legends)
Best Esports Event	Content Creator of the Year
**2022 League of Legends World Championship**‡; Evo 2022; PGL Major Antwerp 2022; 2022 Mid-Season Invitational; 2022 Valorant Champions	**Ludwig Ahgren**‡; Karl Jacobs; Nibellion; Nobru; QTCinderella

=== Games with multiple nominations and awards ===
==== Multiple nominations ====
God of War Ragnarök led the show with eleven nominations, tied for the most in the show's history. It was followed by Elden Ring with eight, and Horizon Forbidden West and Stray with seven. Sony Interactive Entertainment led the publishers with 21 nominations, followed by Annapurna Interactive with 12, and Nintendo with 11. In addition to video game publishers, Netflix received three nominations for its television productions in Best Adaptation.

Games that received multiple nominations
Nominations	Game
11	God of War Ragnarök
8	Elden Ring
7	Horizon Forbidden West
7	Stray
5	A Plague Tale: Requiem
3	Apex Legends
3	Call of Duty: Modern Warfare II
3	Genshin Impact
3	Immortality
3	Neon White
3	Sifu
3	Tunic
3	Xenoblade Chronicles 3
2	As Dusk Falls
2	Destiny 2: The Witch Queen
2	Final Fantasy XIV
2	Fortnite
2	Gran Turismo 7
2	Mario + Rabbids Sparks of Hope
2	MultiVersus
2	Splatoon 3
2	Teenage Mutant Ninja Turtles: Shredder's Revenge

Nominations by publisher
Nominations	Publisher
21	Sony Interactive Entertainment
12	Annapurna Interactive
11	Nintendo
9	Bandai Namco Entertainment
6	Square Enix
5	Electronic Arts
5	Focus Entertainment
4	Finji
4	Warner Bros. Interactive Entertainment
3	Activision
3	Half Mermaid Productions
3	miHoYo
3	Sega
3	Sloclap
2	2K
2	Bungie
2	Devolver Digital
2	Dotemu
2	Epic Games
2	Funcom
2	Riot Games
2	Ubisoft
2	Valve
2	Xbox Game Studios

==== Multiple awards ====
God of War Ragnarök led the show with six wins, followed by Elden Ring with four, and Final Fantasy XIV and Stray with two each. Sony Interactive won a total of seven awards, followed by Bandai Namco Entertainment and Nintendo with four each.

Games that received multiple wins
Awards	Game
6	God of War Ragnarök
4	Elden Ring
2	Final Fantasy XIV
2	Stray

Wins by publisher
Awards	Publisher
7	Sony Interactive Entertainment
4	Bandai Namco Entertainment
4	Nintendo
2	Annapurna Interactive
2	Square Enix

== Presenters and performers ==
=== Presenters ===
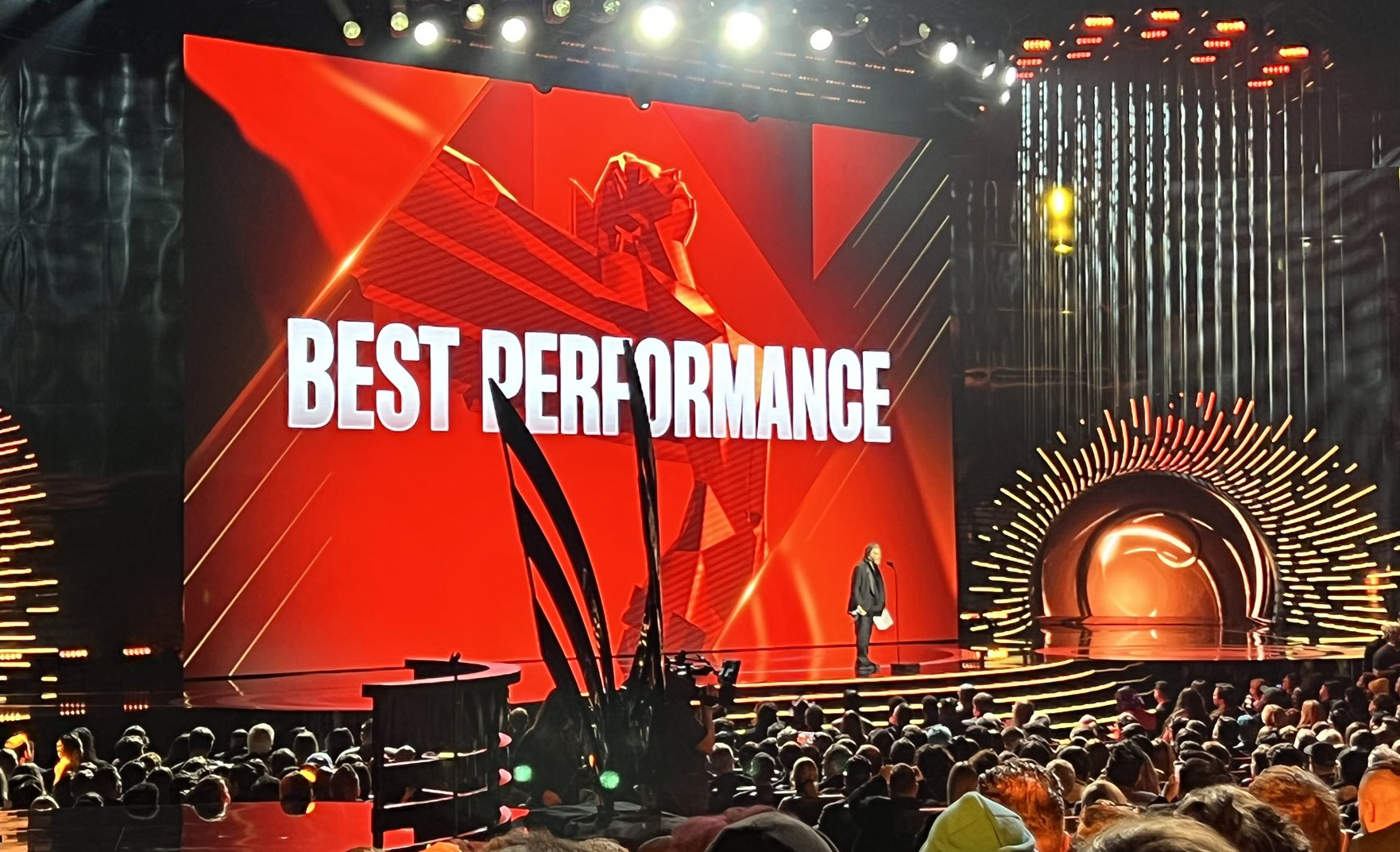
Al Pacino presented the first award for Best Performance.

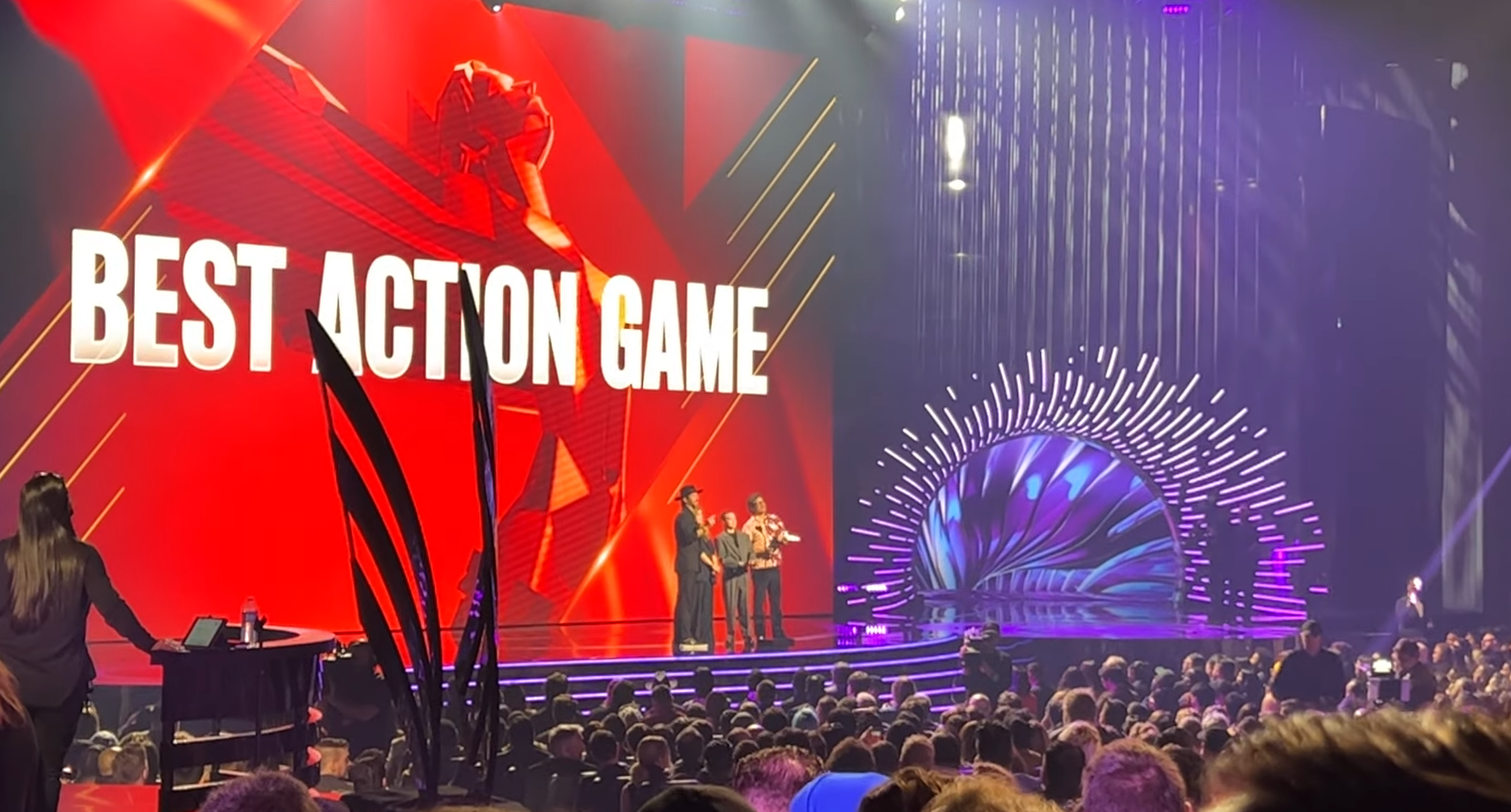
Troy Baker, Ashley Johnson, Bella Ramsey, and Pedro Pascal presented the award for Best Action Game.

The following individuals, listed in order of appearance, presented awards or introduced trailers. All other awards were presented by Keighley or Goodman.

Name	Role
Al Pacino	Presented the award for Best Performance
Jessica Henwick	Introduced presenters Daniel Craig and Rian Johnson
Jessica Henwick	Presented the award for Best Debut Indie Game
Daniel Craig	Presented the nominees for Best Debut Indie Game
Rian Johnson	Presented the nominees for Best Debut Indie Game
Cameron Monaghan	Presented the gameplay trailer for Star Wars Jedi: Survivor
Hideo Kojima	Presented the announcement trailer for Death Stranding 2
Rahul Kohli	Presented the award for Best Narrative
Ken Williams	Presented the award for Games for Impact
Roberta Williams	Presented the award for Games for Impact
Joe Mad	Presented the announcement trailer for Wayfinder
Aurora	Presented the virtual concert trailer for Sky: Children of the Light
Jenova Chen	Presented the virtual concert trailer for Sky: Children of the Light
Troy Baker	Presented the award for Best Action Game
Ashley Johnson	Presented the award for Best Action Game
Pedro Pascal	Presented the award for Best Action Game
Bella Ramsey	Presented the award for Best Action Game
Sokichi Shimooka	Presented the reveal trailer for Blue Protocol
Keegan-Michael Key	Presented the first clip of The Super Mario Bros. Movie
Animal	Presented the award for Best Score and Music
Crash Bandicoot (Note: Costume performer dressed as the fictional character)	Presented the announcement trailer for Crash Team Rumble
Fuslie	Presented the award for Innovation in Accessibility
Valkyrae	Presented the award for Innovation in Accessibility
Kerby Joe Grubb	Presented the announcement trailer for Crime Boss: Rockay City
Michael Madsen	Presented the announcement trailer for Crime Boss: Rockay City
Damion Poitier	Presented the announcement trailer for Crime Boss: Rockay City
Reggie Fils-Aimé	Presented the award for Best Game Direction
Naoki Yoshida	Presented the "Revenge" trailer for Final Fantasy XVI
Josef Fares	Presented the award for Game of the Year

=== Performers ===
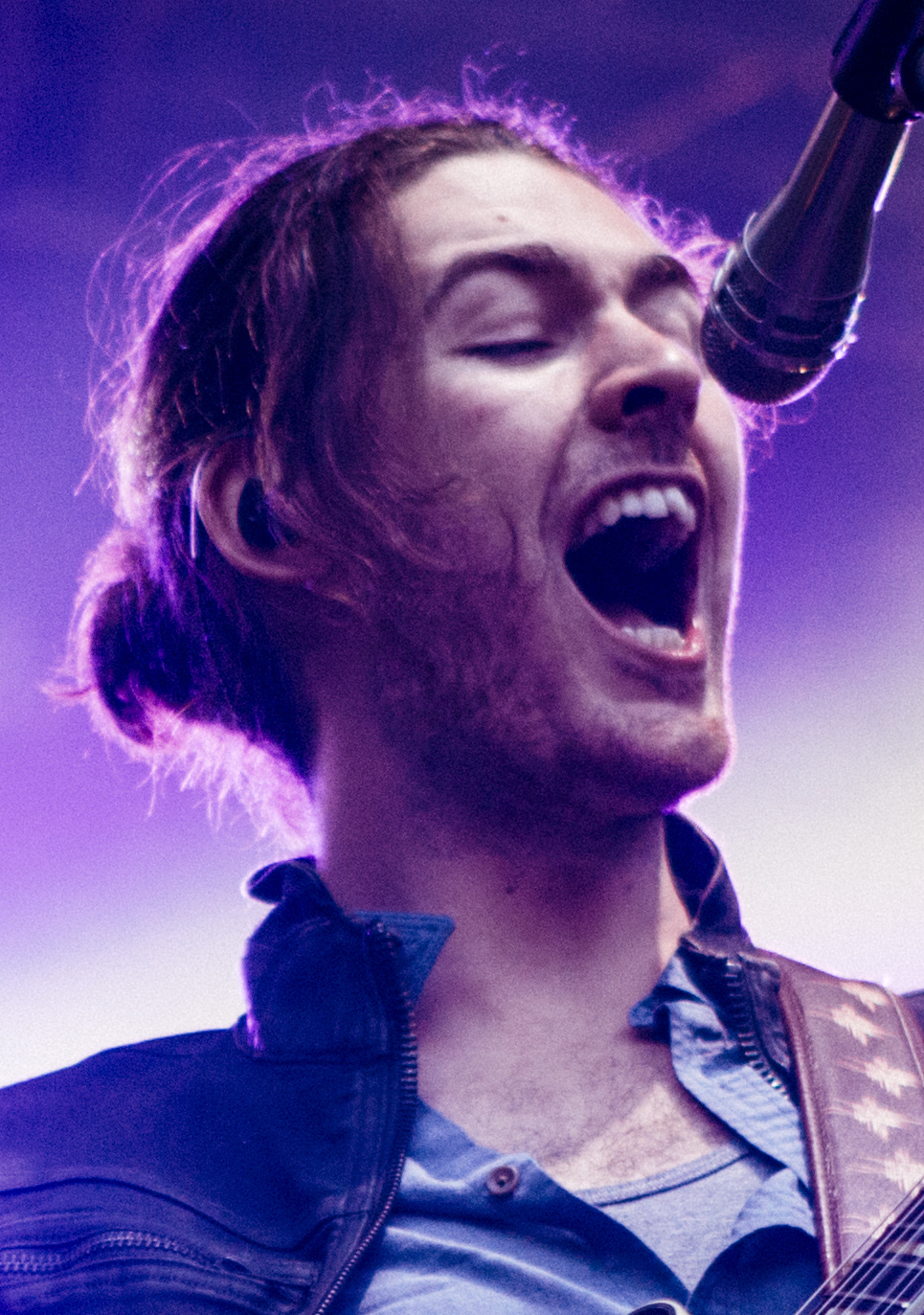
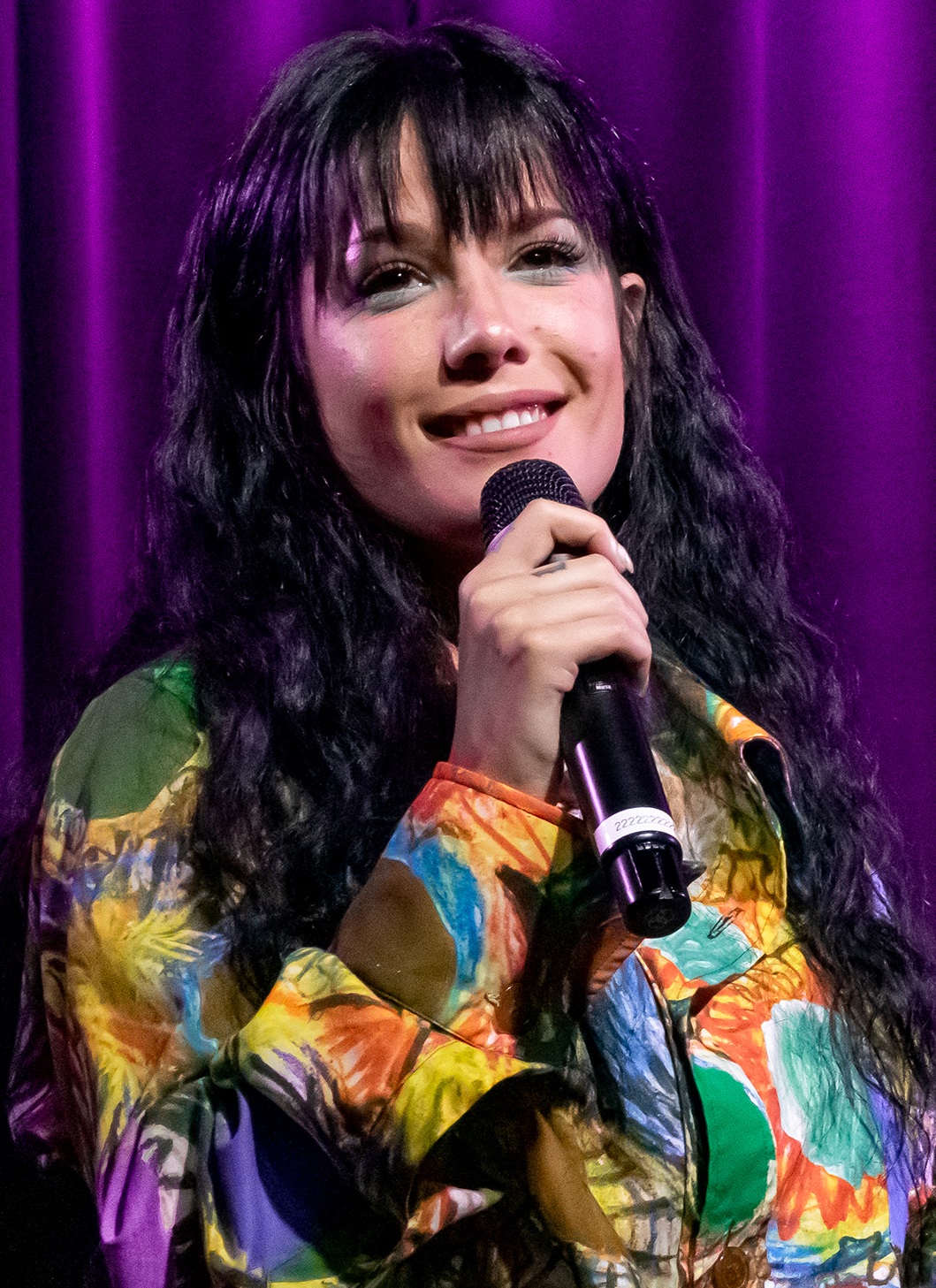
Hozier (left) and Halsey (right) performed songs from God of War Ragnarök and Diablo IV, respectively.

The following individuals or groups performed musical numbers.

Name	Song	Game(s)
Hozier	"Blood Upon the Snow"	God of War Ragnarök
Bear McCreary	"Blood Upon the Snow"	God of War Ragnarök
Halsey	"Lilith"	Diablo IV
The Game Awards Orchestra (Note: Conducted by Lorne Balfe)	Game of the Year medley (Note: The Game of the Year medley's songs included: "In the Flood" from Horizon Forbidden West; "The Weight of Life" from Xenoblade Chronicles 3; "A Plague Tale Requiem" from A Plague Tale: Requiem; "The Way You Compute Tonight" from Stray; "Elden Ring" from Elden Ring; "God of War Ragnarök" from God of War Ragnarök)	A Plague Tale: Requiem
The Game Awards Orchestra	Game of the Year medley	Elden Ring
The Game Awards Orchestra	Game of the Year medley	God of War Ragnarök
The Game Awards Orchestra	Game of the Year medley	Horizon Forbidden West
The Game Awards Orchestra	Game of the Year medley	Stray
The Game Awards Orchestra	Game of the Year medley	Xenoblade Chronicles 3

== Ratings and reception ==
=== Nominees ===
Several journalists and viewers were surprised to see Xenoblade Chronicles 3 nominated for several awards—particularly Game of the Year—due to previous snubs of the Japanese role-playing game genre; GamesRadar+'s Jordan Gerblick called it the show's dark horse nomination. Elden Ring's Best Narrative nomination received mixed responses, with some praising the subtle storytelling and others noting the game lacked a good or proper narrative; The A.V. Club's William Hughes felt nominating Elden Ring alongside the traditional storytelling of God of War Ragnarök and untraditional Immortality was "just begging for the whole exercise to fall apart". Several journalists considered Sifu's Best Fighting Game nomination inappropriate as it is an action game. 4Players's Jonas Hoeger criticized Best Mobile Game nominees Diablo Immortal, Genshin Impact, and Tower of Fantasy due to their manipulative microtransactions systems, and Best Multiplayer Game nominee Overwatch 2 for its problematic early access launch. He felt Best Family Game had become outweighed by Nintendo games and its title was not representative of its nominees, some of which are single-player games.

Destructoid's Eric Van Allen praised the nominations of Citizen Sleeper and Vampire Survivors. PC Gamer's Andy Chalk felt Immortality was overlooked for Best Independent Game, and the Best Sim/Strategy Game category may need reworking due to the "weird" grouping of games like Mario + Rabbids Sparks of Hope, Two Point Campus, and Victoria 3. TheGamer's Eric Switzer named Ghostwire: Tokyo, Hardspace: Shipbreaker, and Sonic Frontiers the biggest snubs and wrote the eligibility period led to games like Pentiment and Somerville—which released after the nominees were announced but before the cutoff date—being overlooked. VentureBeat's Mike Minotti thought Final Fantasy XIV: Endwalker's soundtrack was snubbed—likely due to its release in December 2021—and hoped Live a Live had received more nominations. Game Rant's Aidan Connor felt new categories for roguelike and horror games were necessary to allow recognition for overlooked indie titles like Rogue Legacy 2 and Signalis, respectively. Kotaku's Sisi Jiang found the Games for Impact category insulting, both for assuming AAA games are not impactful and acting as a "consolation award" for indie games.

Den of Geek's John Saavedra felt the Game of the Year nominations of A Plague Tale: Requiem and Stray represented a shift in the industry toward smaller games, supported by It Takes Two's win in 2021. Inverse's Willa Rowe opined the line had blurred between independent and "AA" games, and "indie game" had become more of a stylistic term than a measurable trait, citing small-budget independent games like Citizen Sleeper and I Was a Teenage Exocolonist being overlooked due to the popularity and higher budgets of indie publishers like Annapurna Interactive and Devolver Digital. TheGamer's Stacey Henley similarly considered Stray's nominations unbalanced due to its marketing push by Sony, and felt it exposed a flaw in the hierarchy of categories: its Game of the Year nomination signified it would win the less-prestigious Best Indie Game, which in itself meant it would win Best Debut Indie Game. TheGamer's Sean Murray considered A Plague Tale: Requiem's Game of the Year nomination surprising, calling the game "a compelling sequel" that was brought down by underutilized gameplay mechanics and a poor final act. Similarly, although she enjoyed the game, VentureBeat's Rachel Kaser found Stray's nomination misplaced and thought Tunic would have been more appropriate.

=== Ceremony ===
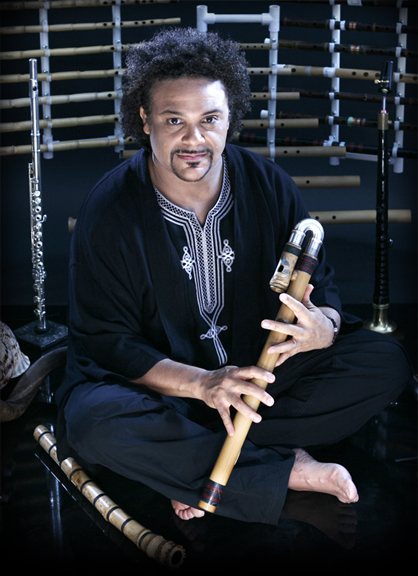
Musician Pedro Eustache, dubbed "Flute Guy", received media attention for his performance as part of the Game Awards Orchestra.

Todd Martens of the Los Angeles Times criticized the show's return to "a vacuum of marketing" with little reference to ongoing events, unlike Keighley's statement the previous year denouncing workplace harassment. He enjoyed some of the moments that "cut through the noise", like Ken and Roberta Williams presenting Games for Impact and As Dusk Falls's director Caroline Marchal's subsequent winning speech. Digital Trends's Colantonio similarly considered the lack of focus on awards disappointing, and noticed the teleprompter asking winners to conclude their speeches almost instantaneously. He cited a particularly disheartening moment in which Keighley announced winners of several important categories in rapid succession and "in an instant and just as quickly" aired a trailer for Call of Duty: Modern Warfare II. Nintendo Life's Zion Grassl felt the winners were rushed off stage too quickly. Variety's Kaare Eriksen identified the show's increasing codependence with Hollywood despite its attempts to highlight the artistic validity of the medium, citing Al Pacino's appearance, the announcement of Idris Elba in Cyberpunk 2077, and the introduction of Best Adaptation won by Netflix.

The Washington Post's Shannon Liao reported the in-person audience was "visibly bored and some look sleepy" in the show's final hour. VentureBeat's Kaser called the event satisfying but predictable, praising Pacino's appearance and Animal's banter with Bear McCreary. The Guardian's Lewis Gordon and Keza MacDonald felt, like previous years, the ceremony continued to focus too heavily on announcements over awards—20 of the 32 winners were crowned between announcements and without acceptance speeches. MacDonald wrote the show lacked a specific focus between awards and announcements, which she felt "sit uneasily together". Gordon found some skits unenjoyable and trailers excessive, and favored the unscripted moments for avoiding the show's otherwise commercial nature, citing Christopher Judge's lengthy acceptance speech; Kotaku's Claire Jackson similarly felt Judge "stole" the show, and VentureBeat's Dean Takahashi described it as "a beautiful moment". Takahashi wrote the show "had something for everyone" and considered Hades II and Judas the biggest surprises.

Destructoid's Noelle Warner, who attended the show as a seat filler, found the impressive production value enhanced the atmosphere of announcements and performances, though noted the event ran longer than planned. Video Games Chronicle's Nathan Brown was shocked by his enjoyment of the show, citing the announcements, performances, and winners, though was disappointed by the focus on marketing over awards and the lack of attention towards indie games; he recommended that future ceremonies drop Best Independent Game and expand other categories to better represent independent developers. TechRadar's Cat Bussell lauded the fresh and unique quality of the games announced at the show but found the winners remained constrained by traditionalism despite their caliber. Push Square's Sammy Barker thought the show reached its full potential, praising the pacing, running time, reveals, and balance between announcements and awards, though questioned the necessity of categories like esports awards when they continue to receive little fanfare. Similarly, Dot Esports's Cale Michael felt esports categories were continually overlooked, noting the winners were announced within 72 seconds during the preshow whereas Judge's speech ran for around eight minutes.

Prior to the show, Kotaku's Alyssa Mercante highlighted the poor fashion of previous Game Awards ceremonies as demonstrative of the industry's lack of representation. The discourse garnered responses from Nintendo of America president Doug Bowser and Microsoft executive Phil Spencer, and Mercante and other journalists recognized it led to an improvement in fashion at the 2022 show; attendees receiving particular praise included Aurora, Fuslie, Hideo Kojima, and Valkyrae. Musician Pedro Eustache, dubbed "Flute Guy", received media attention for his enthusiastic flute performance and ability to swap between instruments during the orchestra's Game of the Year medley; Eustache, who has performed with The Game Awards Orchestra since 2017, thanked the audience for their response and apologized for not using the shinobue during Xenoblade Chronicles 3's section of the medley.

=== Viewership ===
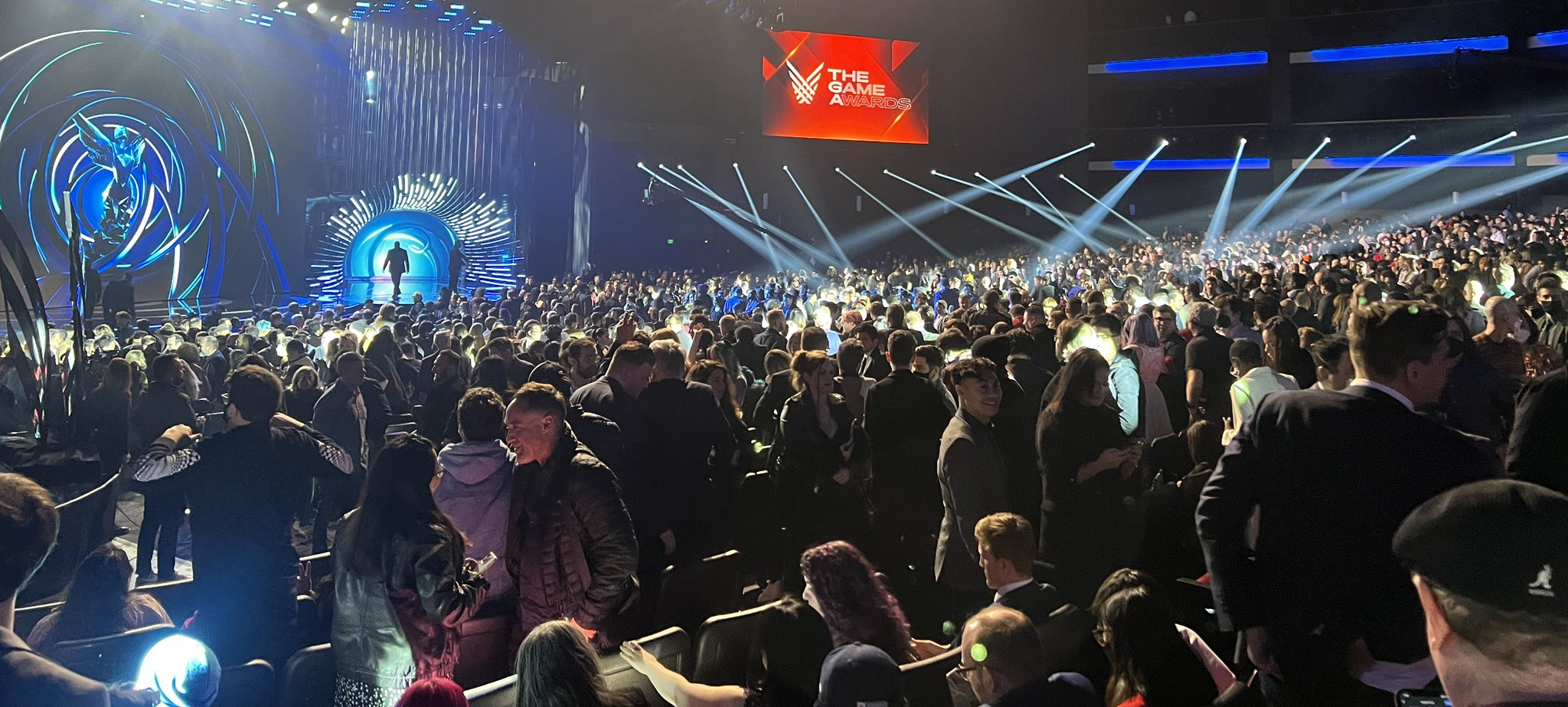
The in-person audience for The Game Awards 2022 at the Microsoft Theater

An estimated 103 million viewers watched the ceremony, the most in the show's history to date and a 20 percent increase from the previous year. Over 11.5 million total views were recorded on Twitter, which saw a 28 percent increase of tweets and a 31 percent increase of the hashtag #TheGameAwards. It topped the trends for the ninth year in a row, with 16 of the top 30 trends related to the show, including the top five. Over 9.5 million total viewers watched on Steam, with a peak of 850,000 concurrent views. On Twitch, the show peaked at 1.9 million concurrent viewers—an increase of 20 percent—with 571,000 on the show's official channel. On YouTube, it set a show record with a peak of 1.33 million concurrent viewers, a 37 percent increase, with 604,000 on the official channel. It was the most-discussed Game Awards ceremony to date on social media, with 308,000 mentions on the day of the event, an increase of almost 180 percent; Judge's extensive speech garnered 12,600 mentions, the stage interruption accounted for 10,100, while the top three games mentioned were Elden Ring (57,300), God of War Ragnarök (31,000), and Hades II (20,600). Keighley had previously felt the 2022 show would be the first to shrink in overall viewership after eight years of successive growth, partly due to the easing of the COVID-19 pandemic and the gradual waning interest in live streams.
