= Due Process =

Due process is the legal requirement that the state must respect all legal rights that are owed to a person.

Due Process may also refer to:

- Due Process Clause, a legal clause found in both the Fifth and Fourteenth Amendments to the United States Constitution
- Due Process (TV series), a legal affairs television show
- Due Process (video game), a first-person shooter video game
- "Due Process" (Arrow), an episode of Arrow
- Due Process Stable, a horse racing stable owned by Robert E. Brennan

== See also ==
- Dew Process, an Australian independent record label
