= Shelmerston =

Shelmerston may refer to:

- Shelmerston, a fictional town in Patrick O'Brian's Aubrey–Maturin series, based upon Appledore, a village in Devon
- Shelmerston, a fictional island town in I Am Dead
