= Lego Voyagers =

LEGO Voyagers
- Developer: Light Brick Studio
- Publisher: Annapurna Interactive
- Director: Karsten Lund
- Composer: Henrik Lindstrand
- Engine: Unity
- Platforms: Windows; Nintendo Switch; Nintendo Switch 2; PlayStation 4; PlayStation 5; Xbox Series X/S
- Release: September 15, 2025
- Genre: Puzzle-platformer
- Mode: Multiplayer

Lego Voyagers is a puzzle-platform video game developed by Light Brick Studio and published by Annapurna Interactive. It is a cooperative multiplayer video game in which two players, each assuming control of a Lego brick, must work together to progress. The game was released on September 15, 2025 for Windows PC, Nintendo Switch, Nintendo Switch 2, PlayStation 4, PlayStation 5 and Xbox Series X and Series S and was well received by critics.

== Gameplay ==
Lego Voyagers is a puzzle-platformer game which supports both local and online cooperative multiplayer. Each player assumes control of a 1x1 Lego brick who must embark on a journey to rescue an abandoned spaceship. The two characters (nicknamed Red and Blue) can roll around and jump. They can also attach themselves to other Lego pieces, and rotate themselves on top of it. The main gameplay loop revolves around two players working together to build items, solve environmental puzzles, and cross gaps and platforms. Occasionally, both Red and Blue can combine together alongside other Lego pieces, forcing both players to move the whole structure at the same time. While the game is largely a wordless adventure, a Lego brick can "sing" to draw their partner's attention.

== Development and release ==
Lego Voyagers was developed by Light Brick Studio, most known for developing Lego Builder's Journey. Light Brick was originally part of The Lego Group, though it was spun off into an independent studio in November 2020. According to creative director Karsten Lund, the three fundamental pillars for the game were "puzzle-platforming, friendship, and co-op". The game was designed to be approachable for audience of all ages, though the team worked to ensure that the difficulty of the game's puzzles will slowly increase as players progress. Lund also added that it was possible for players to build every setpiece in Voyagers using actual Lego bricks.

The game was announced in June 2025 during Summer Game Fest. It was released on September 15, 2025 for Windows PC, Nintendo Switch, PlayStation 4, PlayStation 5 and Xbox Series X and Series S. The game launched with a Friend Pass, which allows the player who purchased the game to send invitations to their friends who can then play the game for free with the player. A launch-day version for Nintendo Switch 2 was announced on September 11.

== Reception ==
Reception

Aggregate scores
Aggregator	Score
Metacritic	(PC) 79/100 (PS5) 79/100 (XSXS) 83/100
OpenCritic	77% recommend

Review scores
Publication	Score
Eurogamer	4/5
Shacknews	8/10

Lego Voyagers received "generally favorable" reviews according to review aggregator website Metacritic. OpenCritic determined that 77% of critics recommended the game.

Journalists noted the difficult controls but specified that the co-op-oriented game play leads to a joyful, calm, and satisfying experience. In the short time since launch, the game has managed to carve itself into several best game lists.

Lucas White for Shacknews awarded the game a score of 8 out of 10, and wrote, "This isn't a difficult game, clearly aimed towards a younger audience. But the LEGO setting is held up by a gentle soundtrack, ambient camerawork, muted colors, and a grounded sense of wonder that gives the overall feeling an ageless quality compared to other LEGO games."

Lego Voyagers was nominated for Best Family Game at The Game Awards 2025, and for Family Game of the Year at the 29th Annual D.I.C.E. Awards.
