= Hindsight (video game) =

2022 adventure video game

- Developer: Team Hindsight
- Publisher: Annapurna Interactive
- Director: Joel McDonald
- Engine: Unity
- Platforms: macOS; Nintendo Switch; iOS; Windows; PlayStation 4; PlayStation 5; Xbox One; Xbox Series X/S
- Release: Switch, iOS, Win; WW: August 4, 2022; PS4, PS5, Xbox One, Xbox Series X/S; WW: December 6, 2022
- Genre: Adventure
- Mode: Single-player

Hindsight is a 2022 adventure video game developed by Team Hindsight and published by Annapurna Interactive. Players relive the memories of a woman who had a complicated relationship with her mother, who recently died.

== Gameplay ==
After her mother's death, Mary returns to her family house. There, players relive Mary's memories, spanning from childhood to adulthood, as she packs her mother's possessions. Selecting objects triggers memories, which players can interact with. Narration explains these past events and how they affected Mary. As players trigger more memories, they learn about Mary's complicated relationship with her mother.

== Development ==
The game was developed by Team Hindsight, led by Joel McDonald who previously worked at Raven Software and developed Prune. Annapurna Interactive released Hindsight for Windows, macOS, Switch, and iOS on August 4, 2022. It was ported to the PlayStation 4 and 5, Xbox One, and Xbox Series X/S on December 6, 2022.

== Reception ==
Reception

Aggregate scores
Aggregator	Score
Metacritic	iOS: 78/100; NS: 70/100; Win: 76/100
OpenCritic	59% recommend

Hindsight received "generally favorable" reviews from critics for its iOS and Windows versions, and "mixed or average" reviews for the Switch version, according to review aggregator Metacritic. OpenCritic determined that 59% of critics recommended the game.

Eurogamer felt the narration was generally unnecessary, but they recommended Hindsight on the strength of its insights on childhood and memory. Nintendo Life called the story "eloquent, mature and moving" and said it is told with "technical and artistic aplomb". Pocket Gamer praised the art and voice acting. They called the story "deeply emotional but a tad repetitive". Nintendo World Report said its theme was to push players to ask their loved ones lingering questions while they still have time. They recommended Hindsight to gamers looking for an emotional story that has light gameplay. TouchArcade recommended the iOS version over the Switch and said it is "essential if you enjoy emotional narratives".
