= Forever Ago =

2026 video game

- Developer: Third Shift
- Publisher: Annapurna Interactive
- Composer: Clark Aboud
- Engine: Unity
- Platforms: Windows; Nintendo Switch 2; PlayStation 5; Xbox Series X/S
- Release: WW: October 8, 2026
- Genre: Adventure
- Mode: Single-player

Forever Ago is an adventure game developed by Third Shift and published by Annapurna Interactive. It was released on October 8, 2026 for Windows, PlayStation 5, Xbox Series X and Series S, and Nintendo Switch 2. The game follows Alfred, an elderly man who travels north by minivan after a personal tragedy, using an instant camera to document his journey and solve environmental puzzles.

== Gameplay ==
Forever Ago is a single-player third-person adventure game. Players control Alfred, a man in his mid-seventies who visits locations from his past while reflecting on loss, regret, hope, and friendship.

The game includes exploration across environments such as forests, deserts, and mountain areas. Players examine objects, meet characters, and learn about the places Alfred visits. Alfred's instant camera is used to take photographs, record memories, and solve small environmental puzzles. The game features an original soundtrack by Clark Aboud.

== Synopsis ==
The game centers on Alfred, who begins a road trip after a tragic event in his life. His journey north is framed around memory, redemption, and his relationship with Audrey.

== Development ==
Forever Ago is the debut project from Third Shift. The game was first announced in July 2020 and later appeared during the Annapurna Interactive Showcase in July 2022. At the time of the 2022 showcase, the game was in early development and had only been confirmed for release on PC.

Third Shift co-founder Kai Brueckers said the game's setting was partly inspired by a trip he took along the Pacific Coast and by the landscapes of North America. The game was re-announced during the Xbox Partner Preview presentation on March 26, 2026, with a new trailer and an updated release window.

Forever Ago was released for PlayStation 5, Xbox Series X/S, Nintendo Switch 2, and Windows on October 8, 2026.

== Reception ==
Reception

Aggregate scores
Aggregator	Score
Metacritic	(PC) 76/100 (XSX) 67/100 (PS5) 74/100
OpenCritic	59% recommend (Note: Based on 45 reviews)

According to the review aggregation website Metacritic, the PC version of Forever Ago received generally favorable reviews from critics, while the Xbox Series X and PlayStation 5 versions of the game received "mixed or average" reviews from critics. Fellow review aggregator OpenCritic assessed that the game received fair approval, being recommended by 59% of critics.
