= Morsels =

- Developer: Furcula
- Publisher: Annapurna Interactive
- Designers: Toby Dixon, Iggy Zuk
- Composer: Sam Webster
- Platforms: Windows; PlayStation 5; Xbox Series X/S; Nintendo Switch
- Release: November 18, 2025
- Genres: Adventure, Creature collector
- Mode: Single-player

Morsels is a roguelite creature collector developed by Toronto based indie developer Furcula and published by Annapurna Interactive. It released on November 18, 2025 for Windows, Xbox Series X and S, PlayStation 5, and Nintendo Switch.

== Development ==
The game was announced in August 2024. Development is led by Toby Dixon. As of June 2025, a demo was playable on Steam. As of November 2025, it's now available for purchase on Steam, Windows, PlayStation 5, Xbox Series X/S and Nintendo Switch.

== Gameplay ==
Players take on the role of a mouse, exploring the sewers for food and collecting monsters called Morsels. Morsels have unique abilities, encouraging the player to switch between them during combat strategically. Combat features fast-paced shooting mechanics and is played from a top-down perspective. The game is described as having "roguelite action", where each run can be unique. Between levels, the player will encounter characters that offer items, rewards, or minigames. Occasionally, these characters may take something away from the player.

The player can wield three Morsel cards at a time. Each Morsel has its own attack, dodge, and special ability.

== Reception ==
Morsels received mixed or average reviews upon release, according to Metacritic. GamesRadar+ awarded the game 3.5/5 stars, complimenting the game's art design and visuals while criticizing the upgrades and "death loop". In a more positive review, Gameliner awarded the title a 4/5, praising the roguelite loop, soundtrack, and minigames.
