= Bounty Star =

2025 video game

- Developer: Dinogod
- Publisher: Annapurna Interactive
- Director: Ben Ruiz
- Designer: Dave Winstead
- Artist: CDR
- Writer: Luis Loza
- Composer: Brother Dege
- Platforms: Windows; Xbox One; Xbox Series X/S; PlayStation 4; PlayStation 5
- Release: October 23, 2025
- Genre: Adventure
- Mode: Single-player

Bounty Star (also known as Bounty Star: The Morose Tale of Graveyard Clem) is a rogue mech/farming adventure game developed by Dinogod and published by Annapurna Interactive, with music composed by songwriter Brother Dege as his posthumous release before his death in 2024. It was released on October 23, 2025 for Windows, Xbox One, Xbox Series X and S, PlayStation 4 and PlayStation 5.

== Gameplay ==
Players take on the role of Clementine "Clem/Graveyard Clem" McKinney (voiced by Renee Faia), a war veteran/mech pilot that lost her army in a post-post-apocalyptic version of the American Southwest, a region known as the Red Expanse. Upon controlling Clem, the player also controls her mech, The Desert Raptor MKII battle vehicle, which can be equipped with a variety of systems, such as heavy-powered melee weapons, steam-powered siege weapons, explosive guns and cannons, and defensive systems using thrusters, riot shields and more.

The farming element of the game has Clem fight her way through corners of the region, filled with violent criminals and dangerous beasts. Within this region is Clem's home, an isolated and run-down garage that acts as the player's base of operations. In the garage, the player can also customize how the base looks while building out water and power supplies, cook food, produce ammo for combat, and even raise some animals.

== Development and release ==
The game was showcased during the Annapurna Interactive Showcase in 2023. On August 20, 2025, it was announced that the game was set to be released on October 23.

== Reception ==
Reception

Aggregate scores
Aggregator	Score
Metacritic	PS5: 74; PC: 73
OpenCritic	33% recommend

Review scores
Publication	Score
Computer Games Magazine	7/10
IGN	8/10

Bounty Star received mixed to positive reviews from critics, according to review aggregator website Metacritic.

GamingBolt gives the game a 6 out of 10 as it praises the setting and character approach but the gameplay lacks the base building and farming style on the narrartive.
