= Last Stop (video game) =

2021 video game

- Developer: Variable State
- Publisher: Annapurna Interactive
- Directors: Jonathan Burroughs; Terry Kenny; Lyndon Holland
- Writers: Jonathan Burroughs; Terry Kenny; Lyndon Holland
- Composer: Lyndon Holland
- Engine: Unity
- Platforms: Windows; Nintendo Switch; PlayStation 4; PlayStation 5; Xbox One; Xbox Series X/S
- Release: July 22, 2021
- Genre: Adventure
- Mode: Single-player

Last Stop is a supernatural adventure video game developed by Variable State and published by Annapurna Interactive for Microsoft Windows, Nintendo Switch, PlayStation 4, PlayStation 5, Xbox One, and Xbox Series X/S.

== Gameplay ==
Last Stop is a third-person game, where players control one of three main characters, by deciding what they should say and performing a variety of minigame interactions.

== Plot ==
=== Introduction ===
In 1980s London, teenage friends Peter Hale and Samantha steal a bobby's helmet from an officer and escape into the tunnels of the London Underground. Taking a service tunnel, they are surprised to find an oddly well-dressed man mysteriously awaiting their arrival. After introducing himself as Frank, he opens a nearby door onto a green portal, offering the two teenagers the opportunity to "step inside"; further warning that "time is running out". Samantha accepts while Peter hesitates. A disappointed Frank says his goodbyes and enters the portal, the door shutting behind him. The pursuing bobbies arrive seconds later, opening the door to find nothing but a wall; the portal, along with Samantha and Frank, gone without a trace.

The game then jumps to 2020s London, covering three stories which can be experienced in an order of the player's choosing, before converging in a combined final chapter.

=== Paper Dolls ===
A screenshot from the video game Last Stop depicting a scene from the story Paper Dolls.

John Smith, a middle-aged father to daughter, Molly Smith, and Jack Smith (no relation), a young programmer that lives in a nearby building but otherwise unrelated, find their bodies switched after a run-in with the same older man in the Underground. After coming to grips with the situation and telling Molly what has happened, they try to live out each other's lives, but both end up getting fired from their jobs.

John, in Jack's body, is able to reapply for his old job with the help of friend of the family and fellow co-worker Shazia Aslam. Meanwhile Jack, in John's body, is hospitalized after suffering a heart attack. John is contacted by the Vape Lord, a vaping store owner who is brothers with Frank, the older man that inadvertently swapped their bodies. The Vape Lord apologizes and offers John travel through a green portal to meet Frank and get the means to return to his own body.

=== Domestic Affairs ===
A screenshot from the video game Last Stop depicting a scene from the story Domestic Affairs.

Meena Hughes is a high-level agent with an intelligence firm run by a now middle-aged Peter Hale. She is screened for an important mission, but Peter also brings in Amy Ng, a relatively new employee, as a second possible candidate. This puts Meena at unease, as she is having an affair with Felix Ajibola, while trying to maintain her marriage to Dan Hughes and their son Dylan Hughes. She also is appalled that her father, Samir Patel, has been buying psychedelics off a street vendor working under the alias "Spider". One night on returning home she finds a note that reveals the writer knows of her affair; her personal investigation into who may have written the note leads to further strain on her marriage.

Suspecting Spider had written the note, she follows him to a garage and confronts him, but he denies the note. As she is about leave, Amy shows up and holds Spider gunpoint. Meena tries to defuse the situation but Spider and Amy shoot each other: Spider is killed and Amy is fatally wounded. Meena tries to help Amy but realizes she was likely the one spying on her and leaves her to die. She then enters Amy's flat and finds several top secret files on her that show she had been stalking her, with Peter's approval. When she is about to confront him, he tells her that a green portal the firm has been monitoring has just opened; she volunteers to enter the portal to complete Peter's mission: to look for Samantha. She tries to make one last call to Dan to save her marriage before donning a special suit and is lowered through the portal.

=== Stranger Danger ===
A screenshot from the video game Last Stop depicting a scene from the story Stranger Danger.

Donna Adeleke is a teenage student living with her mum, Tamara Adeleke, her sister, Emma Adeleke, and Emma's fiancée, Aisling Fisher. While hanging with her schoolmates Vivek Chowdhry and Becky Kim, they spot a handsome man whom Vivek claims to see take people into his house but has never seen them leave. They follow him to an abandoned swimming pool and spy on him as he enters the water glowing green. He discovers their presence, but Becky knocks him out and they secure him there.

The three maintain a watch, fearing the man will go to the police. The man doesn't speak except when alone with Donna, and gets Donna to talk about her problems with her family. Out of Donna's sight, the man uses his powers to cause Aisling to be completely wiped from history and memories. Over time, the man similarly wipes Tamara, Emma, Vivek, and Becky from Donna's memory, leaving her living alone in the pool. The man tells her that he can take her elsewhere, and leads him back to his house where a hole over a green portal sits. As they descend through, Donna sees the bodies of those he made disappear and while she cannot remember them directly, suspects she knows them.

=== Ending ===
The three stories converge in the final chapter: Meena lands hard on an alien planet but is saved by Irving, an alien that guides her to a large settlement. Donna is escorted by the stranger on a train to the same settlement, and when another alien questions the man about Donna, he uses his powers to cause the alien to disappear, which Donna sees and realizes that he has done that to her friends and family. John arrives and finds Frank who apologizes about the swap and gives him a bracelet to undo it. All three converge onto the council chambers, however, when the stranger attacks Meena after she tries to intervene on Donna's behalf, Donna impales him with a sword. The three are taken prisoner and held on trial for murder, where they are sentenced to death. Meena uses the self-destruct on her suit to distract the guards so the three escape the judgement arena and they end up crashing into a pub where they find an adult Samantha. Samantha helps to hide them and explains that she doesn't want to go back since she has made a life here. Samantha explains how they can return to Earth, and after distracting the guards protecting the portal, the three return safely.

The player then has an option to resolve each story with two choices:

- John can decide to swap bodies back, or otherwise continue to live out his life in Jack's younger body.
- Donna, a ghost of the stranger appears and offers her a contract by which he will return all those he took from her in exchange for Donna having to join him forever after she dies, or otherwise continue to be alone.
- Meena tells Peter about Samantha's refusal to return, and Peter feels all his work to now has been for naught; when Meena offers her resignation, he threatens to frame Meena for the deaths of Amy and Spider to keep her at the company - Meena can either quietly accept a lower position in the company but otherwise protect herself and her family from any repercussions, or she can quit and take the fall for the murders.

In the epilogue, local conspiracy theorist Ron finds the original portal door in the subway tunnel.

== Development ==
Last Stop is the second game developed by Variable State, a British independent game developer founded by Jonathan Burroughs and Terry Kenny, former developers with DeepMind Technologies. The game's composer is Lyndon Holland, winner of the 2016 British Academy Games Award for music.

The game was first announced at Microsoft's Xbox London event in November 2019. Additional information about the game was shared during the Xbox Games Showcase in July 2020. The game was released in July 2021.

== Reception ==
Last Stop received "mixed or average" reviews, according to review aggregator Metacritic.

Reception

Aggregate score
Aggregator	Score
Metacritic	PC: 70/100; PS5: 65/100; XSX: 69/100; NS: 67/100

Review scores
Publication	Score
Game Informer	8/10
IGN	6/10
Nintendo Life	70/100
PC Gamer (US)	7/10
Push Square	7/10
VideoGamer.com	6/10
