= D-topia =

- Developer: Marumittu Games
- Publisher: Annapurna Interactive
- Platforms: Windows, Xbox Series X/S, PlayStation 5, Nintendo Switch and Nintendo Switch 2
- Release: July 14, 2026
- Mode: Single-player

D-Topia is an 2026 cozy puzzle-adventure game developed by Marumittu Games and published by Annapurna Interactive. It was released on July 14, 2026.

== Gameplay ==
D-topia is a sci-fi-themed adventure and puzzle game in which you play as the "Facilitator" in a utopian society controlled by AI. The game's mission is to keep the residential complex running, repair machines, help quirky residents, and solve logic puzzles, all while maintaining a seemingly perfect environment.

== Development ==
Marumittu Games is an indie game studio based in Japan. The first official trailer announcing and revealing the game was released worldwide on June 7, 2026.

== Reception ==
Reception

Aggregate scores
Aggregator	Score
Metacritic	(PC) 70/100 (XSX) 72/100 (NS2) 71/100
OpenCritic	64% recommend (Note: Based on 42 reviews)

According to the review aggregation website Metacritic, the PC, Xbox Series X, and Nintendo Switch 2 versions of D-topia all received "mixed or average" reviews from critics. Fellow review aggregator OpenCritic assessed that the game received fair approval, being recommended by 64% of critics.
