= Lushfoil Photography Sim =

2025 video game

- Developer: Matt Newell
- Publisher: Annapurna Interactive
- Engine: Unreal Engine 5
- Platforms: PlayStation 5; Windows; Xbox Series X/S
- Release: April 15, 2025
- Genres: Adventure, photography

Lushfoil Photography Sim is an adventure game developed by Matt Newell and published by Annapurna Interactive. The photography simulator, created with Unreal Engine, showcases various digitized real-life environments across the world through a hiker's perspective. It was released on April 15, 2025 for PlayStation 5, Windows, and Xbox Series X/S.

== Gameplay ==
Lushfoil Photography Sim is a walking simulator where players explore pre-built dynamic environments and take photographs. The player has to take into account various factors consistent with real life while doing so, such as exposure, contrast, white balance, and focus. After photographs are taken, players are able to use in game tools to enhance them.

Some notable environments include: South Tyrol from Italy, Castle Rock from Western Australia, "Le Prarion" from the French Alps, and Yamadera, Yamagata from Japan. As players traverse these environments, they are given the ability to take photos with a configurable virtual camera, search for collectables, and unlock specific activities. The simulator features several ambient tracks unique to each environment to help create an atmosphere of immersion.

== History ==
Some environments showcased in the Lushfoil Photography Sim have been built on previous standalone iterations of themselves that have since been delisted from Steam and itch.io, their two and only means of official distribution. These include the environments featuring three locations in Australia, Iceland, and Japan.

On June 29, 2023, Annapurna Interactive revealed the trailer for Lushfoil Photography Sim after it had agreed to the publish the game following months of development.

== Reception ==
Reception

Aggregate scores
Aggregator	Score
Metacritic	PC: 79/100; PS5: 73/100
OpenCritic	67% recommend

Lushfoil Photography Sim received "generally favorable" reviews from critics, according to review aggregator website Metacritic. Fellow review aggregator OpenCritic assessed that the game received strong approval, being recommended by 67% of critics. Rock Paper Shotgun praised the game's visuals and its approach to teaching photography, while criticizing some of the side content.
