= The Lost Wild =

Upcoming video game

- Developer: Great Ape Games
- Publisher: Annapurna Interactive
- Director: Gary Napper
- Platforms: PlayStation 5; Windows
- Release: 2027
- Genre: Survival horror
- Mode: Single-player

The Lost Wild is an upcoming survival horror video game developed by Great Ape Games and published by Annapurna Interactive. It is planned for release in 2027 for PlayStation 5 and Windows. The game follows Saskia, an investigative reporter who wakes on a mysterious island populated by dinosaurs and explores abandoned research facilities while attempting to survive.

== Gameplay ==
The Lost Wild is played from a first-person perspective. The player controls Saskia and explores a wilderness containing abandoned research facilities, scavenging for items while avoiding dinosaurs. Gameplay focuses on evasion rather than combat, with the player using stealth, hiding places, distractions, environmental objects, and non-lethal tools to survive encounters.

The dinosaurs are designed to behave as animals rather than monsters, with encounters built around observation, caution, and restraint. Items such as flares and makeshift weapons can be used to distract or temporarily intimidate predators, but the player is generally not equipped to kill them.

== Premise ==
The game is set on a mysterious island with overgrown research facilities surrounded by prehistoric wildlife. Saskia is guided by a voice over a radio while trying to uncover what happened on the island and why it was abandoned. The narrative is intended to unfold through exploration, environmental details, and player observation rather than heavy exposition.

== Development and release ==
The Lost Wild is developed by Great Ape Games, a studio based in Brighton, United Kingdom. The project was in development before its publisher announcement, with early work supported by personal investment from the developers and an Epic MegaGrant. By January 2022, the game was in an early pre-alpha state, with publicly shown footage captured from a playable section of approximately 45 minutes. The game was developed with influences from survival horror and adventure games, including Resident Evil, Dino Crisis, Trespasser, Alien: Isolation, Half-Life, and Firewatch. Game director Gary Napper said that his experience working on Alien: Isolation influenced the game's horror design, particularly its use of restraint, anticipation, and unpredictable encounters.

Great Ape Games partnered with publisher Annapurna Interactive, which revealed the game in July 2022. The game is set to be released in 2027 for Windows and PlayStation 5.
