= Ashen (2018 video game) =

- Developer: A44
- Publisher: Annapurna Interactive
- Engine: Unreal Engine 4
- Platforms: Microsoft Windows; Xbox One; Nintendo Switch; PlayStation 4
- Release: Windows, Xbox One; December 7, 2018; Nintendo Switch; December 9, 2019; PlayStation 4; December 12, 2019
- Genre: Action role-playing
- Modes: Single-player, multiplayer

Ashen is an action role-playing game developed by New Zealand studio A44 and published by Annapurna Interactive.

== Gameplay ==
The game is set in a sunless world and tells the story of a character seeking a home. Gameplay is described as including open-world exploration, co-operation or competition with other players, and combat with in-world monsters. The game is presented in a third-person view, with a muted cel-shaded graphics presentation.

Both combat and exploration in an open world were key design elements of the game. Multiplayer elements include interactions with other players, which are incorporated into the game as providing traditional RPG elements such as crafting. Combat includes ranged and melee weapons.

Character growth is primarily dominated by equipment, rather than player "stats"; "Talismans", either found or crafted, are used to upgrade character abilities or provide other in-game perks.

== Development ==
Initial publicity material for the game was released mid-2014. During Microsoft's E3 2015 press conference, Ashen was revealed as an Xbox console launch exclusive being developed by Aurora44 (now A44) under the ID@Xbox independent developer program. Initially released 2014 design elements of the game included survivalist elements and elemental effects, such as the wind as a help or hindrance. The world's geography and ecosystems were intended to be realistically modeled, to play into intelligent play styles within survival mechanisms; additionally, natural geography was intended to be based on an underlying geology. One in-world game element is an enemy known as the "Gnaw", which has the ability to erode the environment "like a searing acid". Much of the background, setting, and feel of the world was influenced by Cormac McCarthy's novel The Road. Combat was described as similar to the Dark Souls series, being high risk, with stamina being a major factor in combat.

Multiplayer elements were described as 'passive', meaning that playing with a partner(s) is not mandated, and entirely optional, though certain situations require cooperative play; AI (computer controlled) allies were also to be implemented. The 'passive' multiplayer element included the conversion of a human player companion into an AI controlled non-player character (NPC)s if they could be escorted to the home town of the main adventurer; however such AI controlled NPCs were not guaranteed to be entirely benign. Art style influences were cited as initially including Superbrothers: Sword & Sworcery EP, Shadow of the Colossus, and The Legend of Zelda series. Developers also stated they had been influenced by the emergent multiplayer storytelling found in the video game DayZ.

== Release ==
While initially listed on Steam, Ashen was later announced as an Epic Games Store timed exclusive but was also later listed as a Microsoft Store and an Xbox One title as a timed exclusive as well.

== Reception ==
Reception

Aggregate score
| Aggregator | Score |
|---|---|
| Metacritic | PC: 81/100; XONE: 78/100; NS: 71/100 |

Review scores
| Publication | Score |
|---|---|
| Destructoid | 7.5/10 |
| Edge | 6/10 |
| Eurogamer | Recommended |
| Game Informer | 8/10 |
| GameSpot | 9/10 |
| GamesRadar+ | 4/5 |
| IGN | 8.5/10 |
| Jeuxvideo.com | 17/20 |
| Nintendo Life | 8/10 |
| Nintendo World Report | 5.5/10 |
| Official Xbox Magazine (UK) | 7/10 |
| PC Gamer (US) | 85/100 |

Ashen was rated 9/10 by GameSpot, and 4/5 by GamesRadar+. Eurogamer also praised the game, awarding it the "Eurogamer Recommended" mark. The game was noted through multiple reviews to hold similarities to the Dark Souls series, specifically Dark Souls.

=== Awards ===
| Year | Award | Category | Result | Ref. |
|---|---|---|---|---|
| 2017 | Game Critics Awards | Best Independent Game | Nominated | |
| 2019 | National Academy of Video Game Trade Reviewers Awards | Game, Original Role Playing | Nominated | |
| 2019 | National Academy of Video Game Trade Reviewers Awards | Original Light Mix Score, New IP | Nominated | |
| 2019 | SXSW Gaming Awards | Most Promising New Intellectual Property | Nominated | |
| 2019 | Golden Joystick Awards | Xbox Game of the Year | Nominated | |
