= People of Note =

2026 musical role-playing action video game

- Developer: Iridium Studios
- Publisher: Annapurna Interactive
- Director: Jason Wishnov
- Artist: Timothy Doolen
- Composer: Big Giant Circles
- Engine: Unreal Engine 4
- Platforms: PlayStation 5; Nintendo Switch 2; Xbox Series X and S; Windows
- Release: April 7, 2026
- Genre: Role-playing
- Mode: Single-player

People of Note is a 2026 musical role-playing action video game developed by Iridium Studios and published by Annapurna Interactive. It was released on April 7, 2026 for the Microsoft Windows, PlayStation 5, Nintendo Switch 2 and Xbox Series X and S.

== Plot ==
Cadence puts together a band of her own after her solo act was shut out by the judges of the Noteworthy Song Contest in the world of Note. The band members then travel in a quest to stop the Harmonic Convergence in wreaking havoc across the world’s musical energies.

== Gameplay ==
People of Note is a turn-based role-playing game where each battle is presented as an interactive musical performance. Each of the bandmates have a different style of music to use in combat, from the rock music of Fret to the electronic music of Synthia. The players can also customize their characters' movesets and adjust their perks through Songstones.

== Development and release ==
People of Note was developed by Iridium Studios. Director Jason Wishnov conceived the game from his experience watching Hamilton in 2017, and wanted to explore the appeal of musicals in video gaming. Rhapsody: A Musical Adventure, Final Fantasy, Chrono Cross, and The World Ends with You were cited as major influences.

In September 2025, Annapurna Interactive announced People of Note from Iridium Studios, makers of There Came an Echo and Before the Echo, as a publisher to their game during Tokyo Game Show. The game features original songs from the cast members with a score by Big Giant Circles. It was later announced on February 18, 2026, that the game will be released on April 7.

The game is dedicated to Jeb and Andrew Kurtzman who both passed away before the game’s release.

== Reception ==
Reception

Aggregate scores
Aggregator	Score
Metacritic	(NS2) 67/100 (PC) 78/100 (PS5) 79/100 (XSXS) 76/100
OpenCritic	67% recommend

Review scores
Publication	Score
Destructoid	8/10
GameSpot	9/10
Hardcore Gamer	4.5/5
Nintendo World Report	6.5/10
Push Square	7/10
Shacknews	7/10

People of Note received "generally favorable" reviews according to the review aggregation website Metacritic. Review aggregator OpenCritic assessed that the game received "Strong" approval, being recommended by 67% of critics.

Polygon thought the game managed to achieve a proper balance of the music and the gameplay, but felt the story wasn't able to get the message across with a disjointed narrative.
