= Flock (video game) =

2024 video game

- Developer: Hollow Ponds
- Publisher: Annapurna Interactive
- Platforms: Windows; PlayStation 4; PlayStation 5; Xbox One; Xbox Series X/S
- Release: July 16, 2024
- Genre: Adventure
- Mode: Co-op mode; single-player

Flock is a 2024 adventure video game by Hollow Ponds and Annapurna Interactive. The player must travel on their giant bird to fill out their field guide by discovering a large variety of fictional creatures.

Critics commended the game's colorful, cartoony art style.

== Gameplay ==
Flock is a 2024 adventure game. The player is tasked by their aunt to fill out their field guide. They travel on their giant bird to find and identify a variety of fictional creatures. A co-op game mode allows two players to play.

== Development ==
Flock is developed by London-based studio Hollow Ponds and published by Annapurna Interactive. The game released on 16 July 2024 for Windows, PlayStation 4 and 5, and Xbox One and Series X/S.

== Reception ==
Reception

Aggregate scores
Aggregator	Score
Metacritic	PC: 75/100; PS5: 78/100
OpenCritic	79% recommend

Review scores
Publication	Score
Eurogamer	4/5
GameSpot	8/10
GamesRadar+	4/5
Hardcore Gamer	2.5/5
The Guardian	3/5

The game received "generally favorable" reviews according to review aggregator platform Metacritic. 79% of critics recommended the game according to OpenCritic.

The Guardian's reviewer described Flock as relaxing and "endearingly strange enough to stand out from the herd", but wished the game had more content, as he completed it in five hours. Polygon enjoyed the game's art style. The bright, vibrant colors and "environments illustrated in patterned brush strokes" perfectly matched the world's whimsy. However, while the art style is beautiful, Hardcore Gamer called the gameplay repetitive and confusing, leaving them "scratching [their] head" while trying to decipher how to progress the game.
