= Annapurna Interactive =

Video game publisher

Annapurna Games, LLC
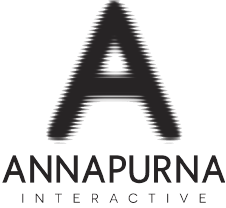
- Trade name: Annapurna Interactive
- Type: Division
- Industry: Video games
- Founded: December 1, 2016; 9 years ago
- Founders: Megan Ellison; Nathan Gary; James Masi
- Headquarters: West Hollywood, California, United States
- Key people: Hector Sanchez (president)
- Parent: Annapurna Pictures
- Subsidiaries: 24 Bit Games
- Website: annapurnainteractive.com

Annapurna Games, LLC (trade name: Annapurna Interactive) is an American video game publisher and developer. The company was founded in 2016 as a division of Annapurna Pictures. It focuses on publishing innovative and emotive indie games. In 2020 Annapurna launched an internal development studio.

Notable video games published by Annapurna Interactive include What Remains of Edith Finch (2017), Donut County (2018), Outer Wilds (2019), Sayonara Wild Hearts (2019), Wattam (2019), Telling Lies (2019), Kentucky Route Zero (2020), Neon White (2022), Stray (2022) and Silent Hill: Townfall (2026).

== History ==
The company was founded as a division of Annapurna Pictures on December 1, 2016 to expand into the video game industry. Its early staff was composed of existing Annapurna executives, producer Neale Hemrajani, technology head James Masi along with several video game veterans, including Nathan Gary, Deborah Mars, Hector Sanchez, and Jeff Legaspi, who had worked in Sony Interactive Entertainment's Santa Monica Studio and Warner Bros. Interactive Entertainment. Jenova Chen was the company's advisor. The company aimed to publish games that are "personal, emotional, and original". Annapurna Interactive acquired games that were in development at Santa Monica Studio's external development division, including What Remains of Edith Finch and Wattam.

On the day of establishment, the company announced several publishing deals it had signed with several independent developers. Some of the first games published by the company included Gorogoa, What Remains of Edith Finch, Wattam, and Florence. In 2017, Annapurna announced that it would begin publishing more games, which included The Artful Escape, Ashen, and Telling Lies.

=== 2020–2023: Game development and film studio ===
In October 2020, Annapurna established an internal development studio in Los Angeles. Also in 2020, Annapurna signed a multi-year publishing agreement with Swedish studio Simogo.

Leading into the COVID-19 pandemic, Annapurna Pictures had been struggling with financial issues, and its CEO Megan Ellison had stepped back while her father Larry Ellison helped to stabilize the company and other executives departed. Megan Ellison eventually reappeared around 2021, and promoted Gary to president of Annapurna Pictures, while Mars and Nathan Vella, former president of Capybara Games, were promoted to co-manage Annapurna Interactive. According to sources speaking to IGN, Gary's management put more resources into the gaming division, as well as promoting Masi to chief administration officer for Annapurna Pictures. Gary also claimed to have established Annapurna Animation, an animation division of Annapurna Pictures, with its premiere work being Nimona, though other sources stated this had been credited to Ellison. As a result, there was a matter of distrust between Ellison and Annapurna Interactive, leading to a hands-off approach for the publisher to continue to group.

Two limited edition box sets containing the games Donut County, Kentucky Route Zero, Outer Wilds, Sayonara Wild Hearts, Wattam, What Remains of Edith Finch, Telling Lies, and Gorogoa were released in collaboration with iam8bit for the PlayStation 4 in late 2020. A similar limited edition box set was released for the Nintendo Switch in late 2023.

In June 2022, Annapurna announced the formation of an internal game development studio headed by Chelsea Hash. Its first game, Blade Runner 2033: Labyrinth, was announced in 2023.

In November 2023, Annapurna Interactive made its first acquisition in South African studio 24 Bit Games, a studio which had provided support for other indie games such as Gone Home, Neon White, and Cocoon.

=== 2024–present: Mass resignations, Remedy Entertainment partnership, and game releases ===
In March 2024, the company's staff were informed that Masi's role was considered unnecessary and that Gary would be the head of Annapurna Interactive despite him also leaving the company. Some staff resigned as a result but later returned along with Masi and Gary to discuss a spin-off of the company that would be able to sign deals independent of Annapurna in addition to overseeing existing Annapurna Interactive projects.

In August 2024, Annapurna Pictures signed a partnership deal with Remedy Entertainment to co-finance the development of Control 2 along with getting the television and film rights to Control and Alan Wake. The deal was negotiated by Sanchez, after leaving Epic Games, who was rehired to lead a new division for AAA and AA games at Annapurna Pictures, while Annapurna Interactive would remain focused on indie games. At the end of August, Annapurna Interactive’s 25-person staff resigned in a joint resignation letter with two weeks notice after spin-off discussions were stalled then ended. Further attempts to reengage Ellison on the spin-off did not receive interest.

Sanchez met with developers on several projects afterward who were frustrated with the situation and stated that Annapurna would fulfill its contractual obligations through backfilling roles and working with outside agencies. Some developers with projects under Annapurna Interactive, including Davey Wreden and C418, and Beethoven & Dinosaur stated its forthcoming or planned games were not affected. Annapurna announced that development of Silent Hill: Townfall and Blade Runner 2033: Labyrinth would continue.

In January 2025, Leanne Loombe joined Annapurna Interactive as executive vice president and head of games. Annapurna released Wanderstop in March 2025, developed by Ivy Road and composed by C418. In April 2025, Lushfoil Photography Sim and first person shooter Skin Deep were released by Annapurna. To a T, with development led by Keita Takahashi was released in May. The adventure-racing title Wheel World was released during summer 2025.

In 2025, Annapurna Interactive announced a publishing deal with The Lego Group via the title Lego Voyagers, developed by Light Brick Studio, and was later released in September 2025

At the Tokyo Game Show in 2025, Annapurna revealed three new games: puzzle-adventure D-topia developed by Marumittu Games, a turn-based RPG musical titled People of Note by Iridium Studios, and Demi and the Fractured Dream from developer Yarn Owl.

== Games ==
=== Games published ===
Year	Title	Developer(s)	Platform(s)	Ref.
2017	What Remains of Edith Finch	Giant Sparrow	Windows, PlayStation 4, PlayStation 5, Xbox One, Xbox Series X/S, Nintendo Switch, iOS	
2017	Flower	Thatgamecompany	Windows, iOS	
2017	Gorogoa	Buried Signal	Windows, macOS, PlayStation 4, Xbox One, Nintendo Switch, iOS, Android	
2018	Florence	Mountains	Windows, macOS, Nintendo Switch, iOS, Android	
2018	Donut County	Ben Esposito	Windows, macOS, PlayStation 4, Xbox One, Nintendo Switch, iOS, Android,	
2018	Gone Home	Fullbright	Nintendo Switch, iOS	
2018	Ashen	A44	Windows, PlayStation 4, Xbox One, Nintendo Switch	
2019	Outer Wilds	Mobius Digital	Windows, PlayStation 4, PlayStation 5, Xbox One, Nintendo Switch, Xbox Series X/S	
2019	Journey	Thatgamecompany	Windows, iOS	
2019	Telling Lies	Sam Barlow, Furious Bee	Windows, macOS, PlayStation 4, Xbox One, Nintendo Switch, iOS,	
2019	Sayonara Wild Hearts	Simogo	Windows, macOS, PlayStation 4, PlayStation 5, Xbox One, Nintendo Switch, iOS, tvOS	
2019	Wattam	Funomena	Windows, PlayStation 4	
2020	Kentucky Route Zero	Cardboard Computer	Windows, Linux, macOS, PlayStation 4, PlayStation 5, Xbox One, Xbox Series X/S, Nintendo Switch, iOS, Android	
2020	If Found...	Dreamfeel	Windows, macOS, Nintendo Switch, iOS	
2020	The Unfinished Swan	Giant Sparrow	Windows, iOS	
2020	I Am Dead	Hollow Ponds, Richard Hogg	Windows, PlayStation 4, PlayStation 5, Xbox One, Xbox Series X/S, Nintendo Switch	
2020	Due Process	Giant Enemy Crab	Windows	
2020	The Pathless	Giant Squid	Windows, macOS, PlayStation 4, PlayStation 5, Xbox One, Xbox Series X/S, Nintendo Switch, iOS, tvOS	
2021	Maquette	Graceful Decay	Windows, PlayStation 4, PlayStation 5, Xbox One, Xbox Series X/S, Nintendo Switch	
2021	Last Stop	Variable State	Windows, PlayStation 4, PlayStation 5, Xbox One, Xbox Series X/S, Nintendo Switch	
2021	Twelve Minutes	Luis Antonio	Windows, PlayStation 4, PlayStation 5, Xbox One, Xbox Series X/S, Nintendo Switch	
2021	The Artful Escape	Beethoven & Dinosaur	Windows, PlayStation 4, PlayStation 5, Xbox One, Xbox Series X/S, Nintendo Switch	
2021	Solar Ash	Heart Machine	Windows, PlayStation 4, PlayStation 5, Xbox One, Xbox Series X/S, Nintendo Switch	
2022	A Memoir Blue	Cloisters Interactive	Windows, PlayStation 4, PlayStation 5, Xbox One, Xbox Series X/S, Nintendo Switch, iOS	
2022	Neon White	Angel Matrix	Windows, PlayStation 4, PlayStation 5, Xbox One, Xbox Series X/S, Nintendo Switch	
2022	Stray	BlueTwelve Studio	Windows, macOS, PlayStation 4, PlayStation 5, Xbox One, Xbox Series X/S, Nintendo Switch, Nintendo Switch 2	
2022	Hohokum	Honeyslug, Richard Hogg	Windows	
2022	Hindsight	Team Hindsight	Windows, macOS, PlayStation 4, PlayStation 5, Xbox One, Xbox Series X/S, Nintendo Switch, iOS	
2023	Storyteller	Daniel Benmergui	Windows, Nintendo Switch, iOS, Android	
2023	Mundaun	Hidden Fields	Windows, PlayStation 4, PlayStation 5, Xbox One, Xbox Series X/S, Nintendo Switch	
2023	Cocoon	Geometric Interactive	Windows, PlayStation 4, PlayStation 5, Xbox One, Xbox Series X/S, Nintendo Switch	
2023	Thirsty Suitors	Outerloop Games	Windows, PlayStation 4, PlayStation 5, Xbox One, Xbox Series X/S, Nintendo Switch	
2024	Open Roads	Open Roads Team	Windows, PlayStation 4, PlayStation 5, Xbox One, Xbox Series X/S, Nintendo Switch	
2024	Lorelei and the Laser Eyes	Simogo	Windows, PlayStation 4, PlayStation 5, Nintendo Switch	
2024	Flock	Hollow Ponds, Richard Hogg	Windows, PlayStation 4, PlayStation 5, Xbox One, Xbox Series X/S	
2025	Wanderstop	Ivy Road	Windows, PlayStation 5, Xbox Series X/S	
2025	Lushfoil Photography Sim	Matt Newell	Windows, PlayStation 5, Xbox Series X/S	
2025	Skin Deep	Blendo Games	Windows	
2025	To a T	Uvula	Windows, PlayStation 5, Xbox Series X/S	
2025	Wheel World	Messhof	Windows, Linux, PlayStation 5, Xbox Series X/S	
2025	Lego Voyagers	Light Brick	Windows, PlayStation 4, PlayStation 5, Xbox Series X/S, Nintendo Switch, Nintendo Switch 2	
2025	Bounty Star	Dinogod	Windows, PlayStation 4, PlayStation 5, Xbox One, Xbox Series X/S	
2025	Morsels	Furcula	Windows, PlayStation 5, Xbox Series X/S, Nintendo Switch	
2026	People of Note	Iridium Studios	Windows, PlayStation 5, Xbox Series X/S, Nintendo Switch 2	
2026	Mixtape	Beethoven & Dinosaur	Windows, PlayStation 5, Xbox Series X/S, Nintendo Switch 2, Amazon Luna	
2026	D-topia	Marumittu Games	Windows, PlayStation 5, Xbox Series X/S, Nintendo Switch, Nintendo Switch 2	
2026	Silent Hill: Townfall	Screen Burn Interactive	Windows, PlayStation 5	
2026	Forever Ago	Third Shift	Windows, Nintendo Switch 2, PlayStation 5, Xbox Series X/S	
2026	Faraway	Steph Thirion	Windows, PlayStation 5, Xbox Series X/S, Nintendo Switch, Nintendo Switch 2	
2027	Demi and the Fractured Dream	Yarn Owl	Windows, PlayStation 5, Xbox Series X/S, Nintendo Switch, Nintendo Switch 2	
2027	The Lost Wild	Great Ape Games	Windows, PlayStation 5	
2027	Uncanyon	Graceful Decay	Windows, PlayStation 5, Xbox Series X/S, Nintendo Switch 2	
TBA	We Kill Monsters	Glass Revolver	Windows	

=== Games cancelled ===
Year	Title	Platform	Ref
TBA	Blade Runner 2033: Labyrinth	Windows	
