= Prune (video game) =

2015 video game

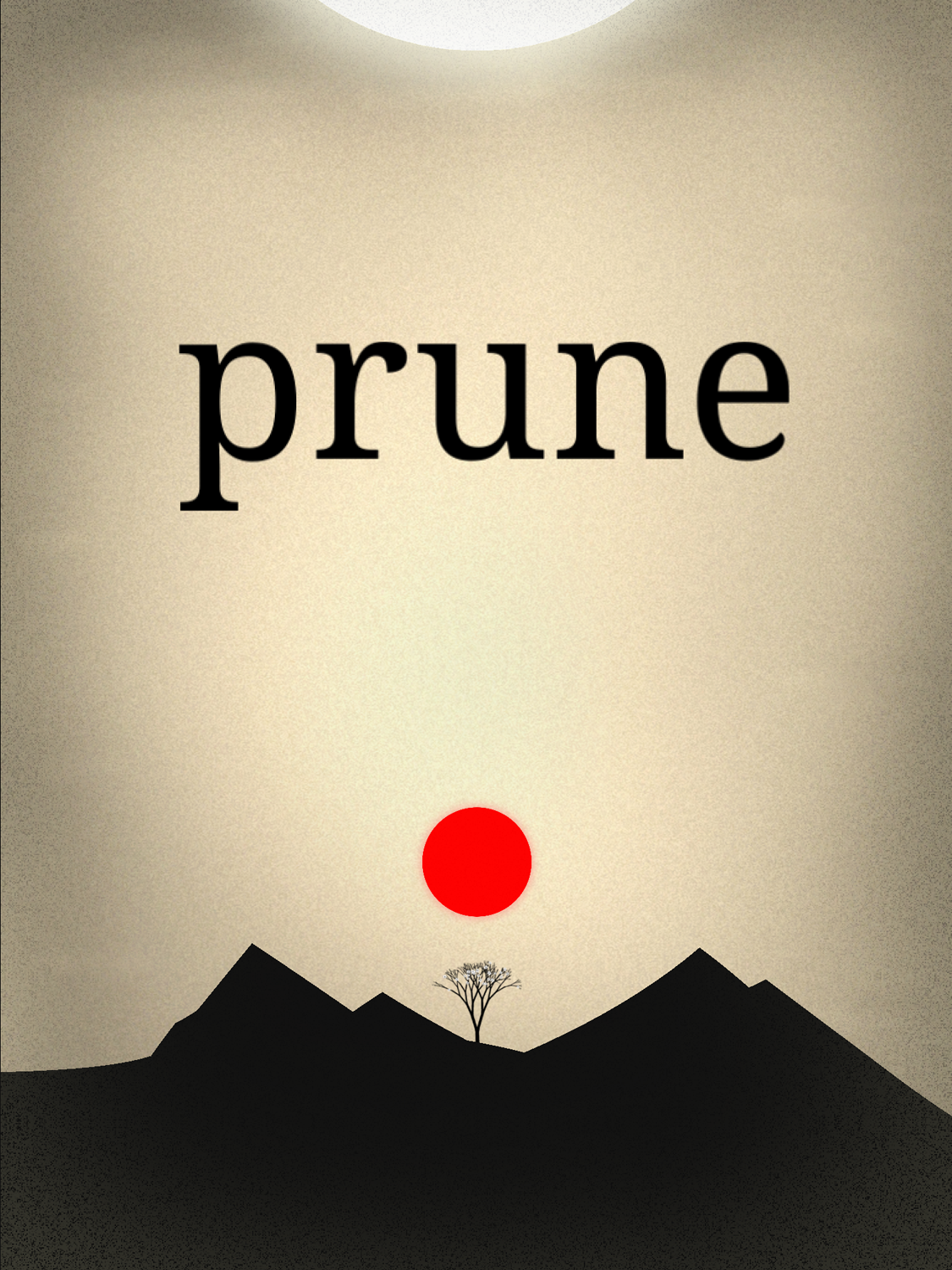
- Developer: Polyculture
- Publisher: Polyculture
- Designer: Joel McDonald
- Composer: Kyle Preston
- Platforms: iOS; Windows; Android; Windows Phone
- Release: iOS; WW: July 25, 2015; Win; WW: October 20, 2015; Android; WW: October 22, 2015; Win Phone; WW: November 3, 2015
- Genre: Puzzle
- Mode: Single-player

Prune is a puzzle video game developed and published by Polyculture in 2015 for iOS, Android, Windows, and Windows Phone. In each of its levels, players shape the growth of a tree to guide it away from hazards and towards light sources. Joel McDonald designed and developed the game, inspired by code to generate trees and a half-fallen tree he had seen with oddly-angled branches. The music was composed by Kyle Preston. Prune received positive reviews for its gameplay and aesthetics, and was Time magazine's game of the year for 2015. It was additionally nominated for categories at the British Academy Games Awards and Game Developers Choice Awards.

== Gameplay ==
Players aid the growth of a tree. As the tree's growth slows, players must prune branches to continue its growth and guide it toward a light source so it can flower. Along the way, players must avoid hazards, such as buzzsaws and glowing orbs, that damage the tree. Players can skip levels if they dislike them.

== Development ==
Developer Joel McDonald had previously worked at Raven Software on the Call of Duty and Wolfenstein series. He went independent in 2013 and was inspired to create a game about trees after seeing a friend post a note on Twitter linking to code to recursively generate trees in Unity. Further inspiration came to McDonald when he saw a half-fallen tree with branches sprouting at odd angles. Prune was released for iOS on July 25, for Windows on October 20, for Android on October 22, and for Windows Phone on November 3, 2015.

== Reception ==
Prune received "universal acclaim" on Metacritic. Eurogamer called it an elegant puzzle game and hoped its release on iOS would encourage further experimental games. TouchArcade praised its gameplay, which said is unique, and called it "simple but beautiful". Pocket Gamer said it is "an awe-inspiring work of digital poetry" and identified meditation as one of its themes. Gamezebo praised its design and gameplay, but they said they experienced many bugs in the iOS version.

Prune was Time magazine's game of the year for 2015 and one of Pocket Gamer's picks for the best iOS apps of 2015. It was nominated for best debut game and best mobile game at the British Academy Games Awards and best mobile game at the Game Developers Choice Awards. It sold 100,000 copies in its first month of release on Apple's App Store.
