= A Memoir Blue =

2022 video game

- Developer: Cloisters Interactive
- Publisher: Annapurna Interactive
- Director: Shelley Chen
- Engine: Unity
- Platforms: Microsoft Windows; Nintendo Switch; PlayStation 4; PlayStation 5; Xbox One; Xbox Series X/S; iOS
- Release: Windows, Switch, PS4, PS5, Xbox One, Series X/S; March 24, 2022 iOS; November 3, 2022
- Genre: Adventure
- Mode: Single-player

A Memoir Blue is an adventure video game developed by studio Cloisters Interactive and published by Annapurna Interactive. The game was released on March 24, 2022 for Windows, PlayStation 4, PlayStation 5, Nintendo Switch, Xbox One, and Xbox Series X/S, and on November 3, 2022 for iOS.

== Gameplay ==
A Memoir Blue is an interactive story video game described by its developers as "an interactive poem". It depicts a fantastical version of swimming athlete Miriam's childhood memories. Players progress through the story by interacting with objects in each scene and moving them around, like clicking on jellyfish that light up or stamping a train ticket. The game utilizes a mixture of 2D and 3D animations, where Miriam's childhood memories are represented in 2D, and Miriam in present day is represented in 3D.

== Development ==
A Memoir Blue began as Cloisters Interactive founder Shelley Chen's Master's degree thesis project. After a prototype of the game was shown at IndieCade, Annapurna Interactive reached out to publish the project. A Memoir Blue was announced during the first Annapurna Interactive Showcase on July 29, 2021.

Chen, who had previously worked on strategy and shooter games, was inspired to create a story-driven game that utilizes visuals and music to deliver the narrative after playing Journey. The story of A Memoir Blue was initially based on her own childhood memories with her mother, and she describes the game as "a way for [her] to thank [her mother]". After partnering with Annapurna Interactive, she describes shaping the story away from being solely based on her personal experiences in the hopes of creating "something that everybody could relate to". Chen cites animated films La Maison en Petits Cubes and Father and Daughter as inspirations for the project, describing how both films "share the common theme of 'familial love'", and manage to evoke strong emotions in the viewer despite their brief length.

== Reception ==
Reception

Aggregate score
| Aggregator | Score |
|---|---|
| Metacritic | PS4: 66/100; PS5: 71/100; XSXS: 75/100 |

Review scores
| Publication | Score |
|---|---|
| Nintendo Life | 4/10 |
| Shacknews | 7/10 |
| The Guardian | 4/5 |
| The Escapist | 8/10 |

A Memoir Blue received "mixed or average" reviews for PlayStation 4 and PlayStation 5 according to review aggregator Metacritic; the Xbox Series X/S version received "generally favorable" reviews.

Simon Parkin of The Guardian praised the game for feeling deeply personal and wrote, "...it achieves that miraculous narrative trick of making the specific feel universally approachable." John Friscia of The Escapist gave a positive review and called the game a "finely crafted piece of art." Ozzie Mejia of Shacknews gave the game a 7 out of 10, lauding the game's art style, narrative, and soundtrack while noting that the story could have offered more and that puzzle design was overly simplistic. In a negative review, Stuart Gipp of Nintendo Life gave the game 4 stars out of 10 and criticized the unremarkable premise, unengaging gameplay, and lackluster story while commending its visuals.
