= I Am Dead =

2020 video game

- Developer: Hollow Ponds
- Publisher: Annapurna Interactive
- Designer: Richard Hogg
- Engine: Unreal Engine 4
- Platforms: Windows; Nintendo Switch; PlayStation 4; PlayStation 5; Xbox One; Xbox Series X/S
- Release: Windows, Switch; October 8, 2020; PS4, PS5, XBO, XSX/S; August 9, 2021
- Genres: Adventure; puzzle
- Mode: Single-player

I Am Dead is a puzzle adventure video game from independent British developer Hollow Pond. It was published by Annapurna Interactive on October 8, 2020, for Microsoft Windows and Nintendo Switch. Versions for PlayStation 4, PlayStation 5, Xbox One and Xbox Series X and Series S were released on August 9, 2021. The game follows Morris Lupton, a museum curator on the island of Shelmerston who recently died. Reunited with the ghost of his dog, Sparky, he discovers that a disaster is about to destroy the island. They both must uncover the ancient mysteries of Shelmerston and stop the island's volcano from erupting, saving the island. To do this, the player has the ability to see inside objects and people, revealing their contents and memories.

== Reception ==
Reception

Aggregate scores
| Aggregator | Score |
|---|---|
| Metacritic | NS: 79/100; PC: 77/100 |
| OpenCritic | 83% recommend |

Review scores
| Publication | Score |
|---|---|
| Edge | 7/10 |
| GameSpot | 7/10 |
| GamesRadar+ | 4.5/5 |
| IGN | 8/10 |
| Nintendo Life | 7/10 |
| Nintendo World Report | 9/10 |
| Shacknews | 8/10 |

I Am Dead was met with "generally favorable" reviews, according to the review aggregator platform Metacritic. Fellow review aggregator OpenCritic assessed that the game received strong approval, being recommended by 83% of critics.

Nintendo Life's Stuart Gipp enjoyed the game's themes but criticized the writing and simplistic gameplay. "I Am Dead is an at times touching and generally thoughtful exploration of loss, grief and lasting memories that doesn't quite resonate as much as it could due to some occasionally-too-twee writing and gameplay that doesn't quite disguise the fact that it's a glorified hidden object game."

Joe Skrebels of IGN felt mixed on the usage of I am Dead's additional challenges, writing: "The separation of the core story and those tougher challenges feels like something of a compromise from developer Hollow Ponds to me, an attempt to offer both an easygoing narrative and something for those who want to be tested, when both sides could perhaps be made more satisfying by combining them."
