= Gotcha =

Gotcha, a colloquial contraction for "got you" (got ya), may refer to:

== Film and TV ==
- Gotcha! (film), a 1985 film starring Anthony Edwards and Linda Fiorentino
- "Gotcha!" (Adventure Time), a 2012 American animation episode
- "Gotcha" (Coupling), a 2001 British sitcom episode
- "Gotcha" (Entourage), a 2007 American comedy-drama episode
- "Gotcha!" (Stitch & Ai), a 2017 Chinese animation episode
- "Gotcha", a practical joke performed on a celebrity on the television show Noel's House Party

== Games ==
- Gotcha (video game), a 1973 arcade game
- Gotcha! (1995 video game)
- Gotcha! The Sport!, a 1987 video game
- Gotcha! Extreme Paintball, a 2004 video game
- Assassin (game), a live action game (also known as Gotcha)

== Journalism ==
- "Gotcha", a controversial frontpage headline which appeared in The Sun newspaper on 4 May 1982 about the ARA General Belgrano sinking
- Gotcha journalism, a newspaper reporting style

== Music ==
=== Songs ===
- "Gotcha" (song), a 2012 song by Jessica Mauboy
- "Gotcha", theme song of the Starsky & Hutch TV series by Tom Scott
- "Gotcha ", a 1982 song by Crass
- "Gotcha ", a song by Mumzy Stranger from his 2008 mixtape

=== Other music ===
- Gotcha! (album), a 1999 album by Salsa band DLG
- Gotcha! (band), a Dutch funk band
- Gotcha! (quartet), a barbershop quartet

== Other uses ==
- Gotcha (company), an American electric bike and scooter-sharing company
- Gotcha (programming), a counter-intuitive, but documented, behavior in a computer system (as opposed to a bug)
- Gotcha Tchogovadzé (born 1941), Georgian ambassador

== See also ==
- Gacha (disambiguation)
