= LA Game Space =

Nonprofit organization

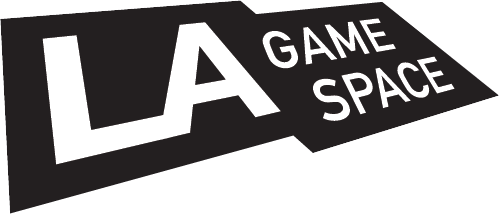
- Abbreviation: LA/GS
- Formation: 2012
- Dissolved: 2018
- Purpose: To explore and expand the potential of videogames as a creative medium
- Location: Los Angeles
- Website: lagamespace.org

LA Game Space was a nonprofit organization focused on experimental game design, research and education. The crowdfunded project planned to open an exhibition space in Los Angeles, along with a research wing, a space for workshops and support for artists in residence. The organization exceeded its crowdfunding target in 2012, but closed down in 2018 having failed to open a physical venue. The project is often cited as an example of a high profile Kickstarter that failed to deliver.

== History ==
=== Founding ===
The project originated in November 2009, founded by Adam Robezzoli and Daniel Rehn. The organisation claimed that it spent three years planning and organizing collaborators and events. However, Eric Nakamura of Giant Robot indicated that he had only a single meeting with the group in 2011, after which his name was applied to promotional materials for the project. He was listed as an "advisory board" member without any further involvement.

=== Kickstarter & experimental games ===
The organisation launched a Kickstarter in 2012. In an interview with Forbes, Rehn described the organisation: "We're a public nonprofit with more than half of our space dedicated to exhibitions. While our day-to-day existence does have a rotating artist residency at its core, we'll also be having regular exhibitions where anyone can come and play/experience new game experiences." The Kickstarter asked for $250,000 and ultimately received $335,657 of funding. Adventure Time creator Pendleton Ward released a short animation to spread awareness of the project.

Backers received access to Experimental Game Pack 01, a collection of titles that for the most part had been developed for the purpose of promoting the project. 30 games were earmarked for the pack originally, but ultimately only 23 were released. The pack included works by Canabalt creator Adam Saltsman, Katamari creator Keita Takahashi and Kentucky Route Zero developer Tamas Kemenczy. To My Favourite Sinner had originally been released in 2009 but was re-released for the pack by Molleindustria. Experimental Game Pack 01 was released on September 7, 2013, with several of the 23 games being added shortly after the main launch. The collection was the only pack of games ever released by the organization.

=== Activities ===
LA Game Space obtained 501(c)(3) status after the conclusion of the Kickstarter campaign. LA Game Space organized events at external venues during this time, such as the Ace Hotel Los Angeles, which were intended as a taster of the kind of events the organisation would ultimately host once the venue was complete. A warehouse was leased and renovated but never opened for the intended purpose. $150,000 was spent on lease and renovation of the site, around half the total. However, updates to backers ceased in 2014, and external event bookings ceased in 2016. The organization ceased operation entirely in 2018, with Nakamura blaming financial mismanagement and approximately a third of the money being taken as salary by the founders.

== Advisory board ==
The original Kickstarter campaign listed a series of "advisors", though Nakamura has alleged that his name and face were used to promote the Kickstarter as a board member after only a single meeting. The listed individuals were:

- Jinsoo An (IxDA LA)
- Brandon Boyer (Venus Patrol/ IGF)
- Benjamin Bratton (Center for Design and Geopolitics)
- Sarah Caluag
- Ricardo Dominguez (BANG Lab)
- Jeremy Douglass (University of California, Santa Barbara)
- Robin Hunicke (Funomena)
- Richard Lemarchand (University of Southern California)
- Eric Nakamura (Giant Robot)
- Michael Scroggins (CalArts)
- Greg J. Smith (Creative Applications/ HOLO)
- Nina Wenhart (Spacebar Gallery)
- Derek Yu (TIGSource/ Mossmouth)

== Games published ==
All of these were published as part of Experimental Game Pack 01. The pack was originally released on September 7, 2013, though some games were added to the set shortly after that date. While the pack was advertised as containing 30 games, 23 were ultimately released, 21 of which were available for Windows, 19 for Mac and 14 for Linux. Since 2018 the Windows versions have been freely available via the Internet Archive, with the Mac versions joining in 2019. Some of the titles have since seen re-releases.

Name	Developer(s)	Notes
A͈L͈P͈H͈A͈B͈E͈T͈	Keita Takahashi & Adam Saltsman	re-released in 2016
CONTROL	Kieran Nolan	
Coureur des bois	Tamas Kemenczy; soundtrack by Ben Babbitt	
Depth	Vince Mckelvie	
Electronic Fortune Teller	Party Time! Hexcellent!	
gamespaceSpacegame	Noah Sasso	
Golden Age: Moths	Resn	
Guilded Youth	Jim Munroe & Matt Hammill	
Inputting	Steve Swink	
Irrational Exuberance	Ben Vance	
IZL△GS	I♡PRESETS	
LA Death Disk	Beau Blyth, Roger ‘Reckahdam’ Hicks & Robin Arnott	
micomonocon	Raquel Meyers, Jens Nirme & Goto80	
a (MOTH) in RELAY	jonCates & Jake Elliott	
Pachalafaka	David Calvo	
Perfect Stride (alpha)	Arcane Kids	
Piano Basketball	Jeremy Bailey	
Poocuzzi	Plateau of the Galaxy	
spiralsky	Brenna Murphy	
Sunshine	Ian Gouldstone, David Surman & Paul Callaghan	
To My Favourite Sinner	Molleindustria	re-release; original launch in 2009
uu	TR-404	
VideoHeroeS (alpha)	Santa Ragione	
The Wanderer	Nicholas O’Brien	

A further 9 games were in development and earmarked for the game pack but not released.

Name	Developer(s)	Notes
Cheque Please	Pendleton Ward & Bennett Foddy	
A Dive	Bryan Ma	
I Hate Flying	Andrew Lovett-Barron	
Tongue Strike II	Chris Collins & Mike Lopez	
Wake Up	Angie Wang & Adam Robezzoli	
Untitled	Cactus	
Untitled	Theodore Darst	
Untitled	Jeremy Douglass	
Untitled	Ruth Gibson & Bruno Martelli	
