= To a T (video game) =

2025 video game

- Developer: uvula
- Publisher: Annapurna Interactive
- Designer: Keita Takahashi
- Engine: Unreal Engine 5
- Platforms: PlayStation 5; Windows; Xbox Series X/S; Nintendo Switch 2
- Release: WW: May 28, 2025
- Genre: Puzzle-adventure
- Mode: Single-player

To a T is a 2025 puzzle-adventure developed by uvula and published by Annapurna Interactive, in collaboration with AbleGamers. It was designed by Keita Takahashi. To a T was released on May 28, 2025 for PlayStation 5, Windows and Xbox Series X/S. The Nintendo Switch 2 version of the game was also released on June 11, 2026.

== Plot ==
Teen is a 13-year-old kid stuck in a T-pose, who lives with their dog and their mother Niko, in a small seaside town. As Teen is getting ready to leave for school (which involves getting dressed, washing their face, eating cereal and brushing their teeth) on what happens to be their birthday, they become dejected at the thought of being harassed for their physical ailment. Their mother encourages them to go anyway, reminding them to keep their head high. As Teen and their dog leave for school, they stop by a sandwich shop run by a giraffe (there are four food shops in town, each run by a giraffe) and grab a sandwich. During the school day, a trio of bullies harass Teen by stacking books in the shape of a T and imitating their stance. As they walk home dejected, the dog relieves himself on a stranger's lawn. Teen starts to panic as the stranger opens his door, until they're suddenly hit with a vision, and a strange voice, who tells Teen to spin around so fast they lift off the ground, taking their Dog with him.

The next day sees a semi-typical day at school for Teen, including doing warm-up exercises for physical education and doing science experiments. As they're eating lunch on the school roof, the same bullies come by to continue mocking them, leaving them as dejected as before. As the bullies leave, a strange object falls from the sky and knocks a nearby wind turbine out of place, which crashes into the school and sends one of the bullies flying. As she falls, Teen decides to spin once more, flying off the ground and saving the bully before crashing into another tree, breaking their leg in the process.

== Gameplay ==
To a T is a narrative coming-of-age story featuring the main character "Teen", who is stuck in a T-pose, while navigating life in a small town with their dog companion. Teen will "interact with townsfolk, engage in activities, and discover secrets" along the way. The developer and publisher have also described the title as a "life-sim". Partway through the game, Teen unlocks the ability to fly by spinning very fast and then jumping, which allows them to reach new areas not previously reachable by foot.

== Development ==
To a T was designed by Keita Takahashi, creator and designer of the Katamari Damacy series. Keita Takahashi revealed his new studio uvula and their work on an unannounced game with Annapurna Interactive in August 2022. A full reveal followed in June 2023, with a trailer showcasing gameplay from To a T. Previously, Takahashi had designed Wattam, a puzzle-platforming game developed by Funomena and published by Annapurna Interactive. Originally the title was intended to be a PlayStation 4 exclusive published by Sony and co-developed by Santa Monica Studio. However, this version never came to fruition and Annapurna stepped in to publish the game after Sony Interactive Entertainment ceased involvement.

On February 24, 2025, uvula put out a release date trailer featuring a new original song performed by Rebecca Sugar, creator of Steven Universe, which was written by the game's composer Sakai Asuka and lyrics by Keita Takahashi and Sam Bird. The trailer premiered during Annapurna Interactive's 2025 showcase. The game was released on May 28, 2025 for PlayStation 5, Windows and Xbox Series X/S.

== Reception ==
Reception

Aggregate scores
Aggregator	Score
Metacritic	(PC) 73/100 (PS5) 70/100
OpenCritic	48% recommend

Review scores
Publication	Score
Digital Trends	3/5
GameSpot	6/10
GamesRadar+	4/5
PC Gamer (US)	70/100
Push Square	8/10
RPGFan	82/100
Shacknews	8/10

To a T received "mixed or average" reviews, according to review aggregator website Metacritic. OpenCritic determined that 48% of critics recommend the game.

Push Square praised the game for being "personal, touching, and guaranteed to make you smile".
