= 16th British Academy Games Awards =

Game award ceremony in 2020

- Date: 2 April 2020
- Location: Live-streamed
- Hosted by: Dara Ó Briain
- Best Game: Outer Wilds
- Most awards: Disco Elysium and Outer Wilds (3)
- Most nominations: Control and Death Stranding (11)

The 16th British Academy Video Game Awards was hosted by the British Academy of Film and Television Arts on 2 April 2020 to honour the best video games of 2019. Though originally planned to be presented at a ceremony at the Queen Elizabeth Hall in London, the event was instead presented as a live stream due to concern over the coronavirus pandemic. The nominees were announced on 3 March 2020, with Control and Death Stranding leading the group with eleven nominations each, breaking the record of ten set by Uncharted 2: Among Thieves, The Last of Us, Everybody's Gone to the Rapture and God of War as the most nominations received by a game.

== Category changes ==
For the 16th BAFTA Game Awards, one new category was added. The Best Animation category covers all elements of animation (including ambient, facial and cinematics) and aims to celebrate the role that animation plays in creating believable and engaging worlds, seeking to complement the already existing Artistic Achievement category. Additionally, the Best Performer category has been expanded and split into two new categories, Performer in a Leading Role and Performance in a Supporting Role, a decision that moves to highlight and recognize the increasing importance of voice over and motion capture performance in video games.

Furthermore, the Game Innovation category has been abolished and assimilated into a new Technical Achievement category which intends to celebrate all elements of gameplay programming and visual engineering. The Mobile Game category has also been retired though the public-voted EE Mobile Game of the Year award remains.

Due to these category changes, the 16th BAFTA Game Awards will feature 18 competitive categories in total.

== Presentation ==
The awards had been planned to be presented at a live ceremony at the Queen Elizabeth Hall in London on 2 April 2020. However, with the coronavirus pandemic, the Academy opted to forego the live ceremony and instead present the awards through a pre-recorded streamed event via YouTube. Dara Ó Briain, who had been set to host the live event, served as host from his home for the stream, with pre-recorded acceptance speeches for the winners shown.

== Winners and nominees ==
The nominations were announced on 3 March 2020, and winners named on 2 April.

Best Game: Outer Wilds – Mobius Digital/Annapurna Interactive; Control – Remedy Entertainment/505 Games; Disco Elysium – ZA/UM; Luigi's Mansion 3 – Next Level Games/Nintendo; Sekiro: Shadows Die Twice – FromSoftware/Activision; Untitled Goose Game – House House/Panic	Animation: Luigi's Mansion 3 – Next Level Games/Nintendo; Call of Duty: Modern Warfare – Infinity Ward/Activision; Control – Remedy Entertainment/505 Games; Death Stranding – Kojima Productions/Sony Interactive Entertainment; Sayonara Wild Hearts – Simogo/Annapurna Interactive; Sekiro: Shadows Die Twice – FromSoftware/Activision
Artistic Achievement: Sayonara Wild Hearts – Simogo/Annapurna Interactive; Concrete Genie – Pixelopus/Sony Interactive Entertainment; Control – Remedy Entertainment/505 Games; Death Stranding – Kojima Productions/Sony Interactive Entertainment; Disco Elysium – ZA/UM; Knights and Bikes – Foam Sword/Double Fine Presents	Audio Achievement: Ape Out – Gabe Cuzzillo, Matt Boch, Bennett Foddy/Devolver Digital; Call of Duty: Modern Warfare – Infinity Ward/Activision; Control – Remedy Entertainment/505 Games; Death Stranding – Kojima Productions/Sony Interactive Entertainment; Star Wars Jedi: Fallen Order – Nick Laviers (Respawn Entertainment)/Electronic Arts; Untitled Goose Game – House House/Panic
British Game: Observation – No Code/Devolver Digital; Dirt Rally 2.0 – Codemasters; Heaven's Vault – Joseph Humfrey, Jon Ingold, Laura Dilloway (Inkle); Knights and Bikes – Rex Crowle, Moo Yu, Kenneth C M Young (Foam Sword)/Double Fine Presents; Planet Zoo – Frontier Developments; Total War: Three Kingdoms – Creative Assembly/Sega	Debut Game: Disco Elysium – ZA/UM; Ape Out – Gabe Cuzzillo, Matt Boch, Bennett Foddy/Devolver Digital; Death Stranding – Kojima Productions/Sony Interactive Entertainment; Katana Zero – Justin Stander, Askiisoft/Devolver Digital; Knights and Bikes – Rex Crowle, Moo Yu, Kenneth C M Young (Foam Sword)/Double Fine Presents; Manifold Garden – William Chyr Studios
Evolving Game: Path of Exile – Grinding Gear Games; Apex Legends – Chad Grenier, Drew McCoy (Respawn Entertainment)/Electronic Arts; Destiny 2 – Bungie; Final Fantasy XIV: Shadowbringers – Square Enix; Fortnite – Epic Games; No Man's Sky: Beyond – Hello Games	Family: Untitled Goose Game – House House/Panic; Concrete Genie – Pixelopus/Sony Interactive Entertainment; Knights and Bikes – Rex Crowle, Moo Yu, Kenneth C M Young (Foam Sword)/Double Fine Presents; Luigi's Mansion 3 – Next Level Games/Nintendo; Vacation Simulator – Owlchemy Labs; Wattam – Funomena/Annapurna Interactive
Game Beyond Entertainment: Kind Words (lo fi chill beats to write to) – Ziba Scott, Luigi Guateri, Clark Aboud (Popcannibal); Civilization VI: Gathering Storm – Firaxis Games/2K Games; Death Stranding – Kojima Productions/Sony Interactive Entertainment; Life Is Strange 2 – Dontnod Entertainment/Square Enix; Neo Cab – Chance Agency/Fellow Traveller Games; Ring Fit Adventure – Nintendo	Game Design: Outer Wilds – Mobius Digital/Annapurna Interactive; Baba Is You – Arvi Teikari/Hempuli Oy; Control – Remedy Entertainment/505 Games; Disco Elysium – ZA/UM; Sekiro: Shadows Die Twice – FromSoftware/Activision; Wattam – Funomena/Annapurna Interactive
Multiplayer: Apex Legends – Brent McLeod, Carlos Pineda (Respawn Entertainment)/Electronic Arts; Borderlands 3 – Gearbox Software/2K; Call of Duty: Modern Warfare – Infinity Ward/Activision; Luigi's Mansion 3 – Next Level Games/Nintendo; Tick Tock: A Tale for Two – Other Tales Interactive; Tom Clancy's The Division 2 – Massive Entertainment/Ubisoft	Music: Disco Elysium – ZA/UM; Control – Petri Alanko, Martin Stig Andersen (Remedy Entertainment)/505 Games; Death Stranding – Kojima Productions/Sony Interactive Entertainment; Outer Wilds – Mobius Digital/Annapurna Interactive; The Legend of Zelda: Link's Awakening – Grezzo/Nintendo; Wattam – Asuka Takahashi (Funomena)/Annapurna Interactive
Narrative: Disco Elysium – ZA/UM; Control – Remedy Entertainment/505 Games; Life Is Strange 2 – Dontnod Entertainment/Square Enix; Outer Wilds – Mobius Digital/Annapurna Interactive; The Outer Worlds – Tim Cain, Leonard Boyarsky (Obsidian Entertainment)/Private Division; Star Wars Jedi: Fallen Order – Aaron Conteras, Matt Michnovetz, Stig Asmussen (Respawn Entertainment)/Electronic Arts	Original Property: Outer Wilds – Mobius Digital/Annapurna Interactive; Baba Is You – Arvi Teikari/Hempuli Oy; Control – Remedy Entertainment/505 Games; Death Stranding – Kojima Productions/Sony Interactive Entertainment; Disco Elysium – ZA/UM; Untitled Goose Game – House House/Panic
Performer in a Leading Role: Gonzalo Martin as Sean Diaz in Life Is Strange 2; Laura Bailey as Kait Diaz in Gears 5; Courtney Hope as Jesse Faden in Control; Logan Marshall-Green as David in Telling Lies; Barry Sloane as Captain Price in Call of Duty: Modern Warfare; Norman Reedus as Sam in Death Stranding	Performer in a Supporting Role: Martti Suosalo as Ahti the Janitor in Control; Jolene Andersen as Karen Reynolds in Life Is Strange 2; Troy Baker as Higgs in Death Stranding; Sarah Bartholomew as Cassidy (Lucy Rose Jones) in Life Is Strange 2; Ayisha Issa as Fliss in The Dark Pictures Anthology: Man of Medan; Lea Seydoux as Fragile in Death Stranding
Technical Achievement: Death Stranding – Kojima Productions/Sony Interactive Entertainment; A Plague Tale: Innocence – Asobo Studio/Focus Home Interactive; Call of Duty: Modern Warfare – Infinity Ward/Activision; Control – Remedy Entertainment/505 Games; Metro Exodus – 4A Games/Deep Silver; Sekiro: Shadows Die Twice – FromSoftware/Activision	EE Mobile Game of the Year: Call of Duty: Mobile – Timi Studios/Activision; Assemble with Care – Ustwo; Dead Man's Phone – Electric Noir Studios; Pokémon Go – The Pokémon Company, Niantic/Nintendo; Tangle Tower – SFB Games; What the Golf? – Triband

BAFTA Fellowship: Hideo Kojima

=== Games with multiple nominations and wins ===
==== Nominations ====
Nominations	Game
11	Control
11	Death Stranding
7	Disco Elysium
5	Call of Duty: Modern Warfare
5	Life is Strange 2
5	Outer Wilds
4	Knights and Bikes
4	Luigi's Mansion 3
4	Sekiro: Shadows Die Twice
4	Untitled Goose Game
3	Wattam
2	Ape Out
2	Apex Legends
2	Baba Is You
2	Concrete Genie
2	Sayonara Wild Hearts
2	Star Wars Jedi: Fallen Order

==== Wins ====
Wins	Game
3	Disco Elysium
3	Outer Wilds
