= I Gotcha =

I Gotcha may refer to:

- "I Gotcha" (Joe Tex song), 1972
- "I Gotcha" (Lupe Fiasco song), 2006

== See also ==
- I Got You (disambiguation)
- Gotcha (disambiguation)
