= I Got You =

I Got You may refer to:

- "I Got You" (Badfinger song)
- "I Got You" (Bebe Rexha song), 2016
- "I Got You" (Craig Morgan song), 2005
- "I Got You" (Dwight Yoakam song), 1989
- "I Got You" (Leona Lewis song), 2009
- "I Got You" (Jack Johnson song), 2013
- "I Got You" (Nick Carter song), 2003
- "I Got You" (Split Enz song), 1980
- "I Got You" (Shenandoah song), 1991
- "I Got You" (Thompson Square song), 2011
- "I Got You" (Twice song), 2024
- I Got You (I Feel Good) (album), a 1966 album by James Brown
  - "I Got You (I Feel Good)", a 1965 song by James Brown
- "I Got U", a 2014 song by Duke Dumont
- "I Got You", a song by Apink from Une Année
- "I Got You", a song by Ciara from Jackie
- "I Got You", a song by Cimorelli from Renegade
- "I Got You", a song by Karmin from Leo Rising
- "I Got You", a song by Leona Lewis from I Am (2015)
- "I Got You", a song by Mark Picchiotti
- "I Got You", a song by Now United
- "I Got You", a song by Stone Temple Pilots from No. 4
- "I Got You", a song by Train from Save Me, San Francisco
- "I Got You", a song by Whitney Houston from I Look to You
- "I Got You", a song by Devon Cole from Two Shades Blonder
- "I Got You (At the End of the Century)", a song by Wilco from Being There
- "I Got U", a song by DJ Kay Slay from The Streetsweeper, Vol. 1
- "I Got U", a song by Lucy from Gatcha!
- "I Got U", a song by Selena Gomez & the Scene from Kiss & Tell
- I Got You (TV series), a Philippine romantic drama television series

== See also ==
- "I Got You Babe", a 1965 song by Sonny & Cher
- I've Got You (disambiguation)
- I Gotcha (disambiguation)
