= Gacha =

The word Gacha may refer to:

- Gashapon, a kind of toy that originated in Japan which is sold inside a plastic capsule.
  - Gacha game, video games that are monetized via a concept that is similar to gashapon.
- Gācha, an administrative district in Bangladesh
- Gacha Gacha, a Japanese shōnen manga by Hiroyuki Tamakoshi which ran from 2002–2007
- Gatcha Gacha, a Japanese shōjo manga by Yutaka Tachibana which ran from 2001–2008
- José Gonzalo Rodríguez Gacha (1947–1989), a Colombian drug lord and co-founder of the Medellín Cartel
- Beya Gille Gacha (born 1990), French sculptor
- Gacha (Mongolian: ᠭᠠᠴᠠᠭ᠎ᠠ, romanized: Gaqaa; Chinese: 嘎查; pinyin: Gāchá), the smallest administrative unit in Inner Mongolia, same as a nomadic settlement or hamlet.

== See also ==
- Gotcha (disambiguation)
