= Alphabet (video game) =

2013 video game

- Publisher: LA Game Space
- Designers: Keita Takahashi; Adam Saltsman
- Platforms: Windows, OS X, Linux
- Release: September 7, 2013
- Modes: Single-player, multiplayer

Alphabet (stylized as A͈L͈P͈H͈A͈B͈E͈T͈) is a 2013 experimental video game that was developed by Keita Takahashi and Adam Saltsman. Saltsman has additionally described the game as a "massively single-player offline game", with it being sometimes presented as an installation piece.

== Gameplay ==
The objective of the game is to guide increasing numbers of letters to the finish line – with one keyboard key corresponding to each letter. The player can tap a key to make the letter jump, or hold it to make it run. This task quickly becomes chaotic due to the large number of letters that need to be managed. In the 2016 arcade-style version, this reaches a maximum of ten letters, while the 2013 version features the full alphabet.

== Releases ==
Announced in 2012, the game was originally developed and released as part of Experimental Game Pack 01, a collection of games released to Kickstarter backers of LA Game Space in 2013. The game was first made playable to the public at an event hosted by Juegos Rancheros on April 5, 2013, while the downloadable game pack released that September. In December 2013, Japanese magazine Dengeki offered skins for the PlayStation Vita themed around Alphabet and Tenya Wanya – another of Takahashi's games.

The game was later re-released in an arcade format for the 2016 Fantastic Arcade, and when LA/GS ceased operation in 2018 the Windows version of the title was made freely available via The Internet Archive.

From January 23 to July 14, 2019, Telfair Museums ran an exhibition at the Jepson Center entitled "Keita Takahashi: Zooming Out", featuring various elements of Takahashi's work including Alphabet. The game was presented at the installation with a custom controller table with large circular buttons for each letter.

== Reception ==
Wired called the game's premise "deceptively straightforward", stating that the Fantastic Arcade version's gameplay became "frantic" as the amount of characters they had to control increased and describing the game as "overwhelming insanity". They also recounted that even the 10-letter version was "simply beyond [their] capacity to handle."

Paste, who found it "endearing", called it the third-best game from Fantastic Arcade 2016. While they described it as a "frantic typing mess" and remarked that they became "annoyed in harder levels," they concluded: "Alphabet has a great deal of style and charm, and is unique enough that it's hard to dissuade anyone from trying it at least once."
