= Brandon Boyer =

American blogger (born 1977)

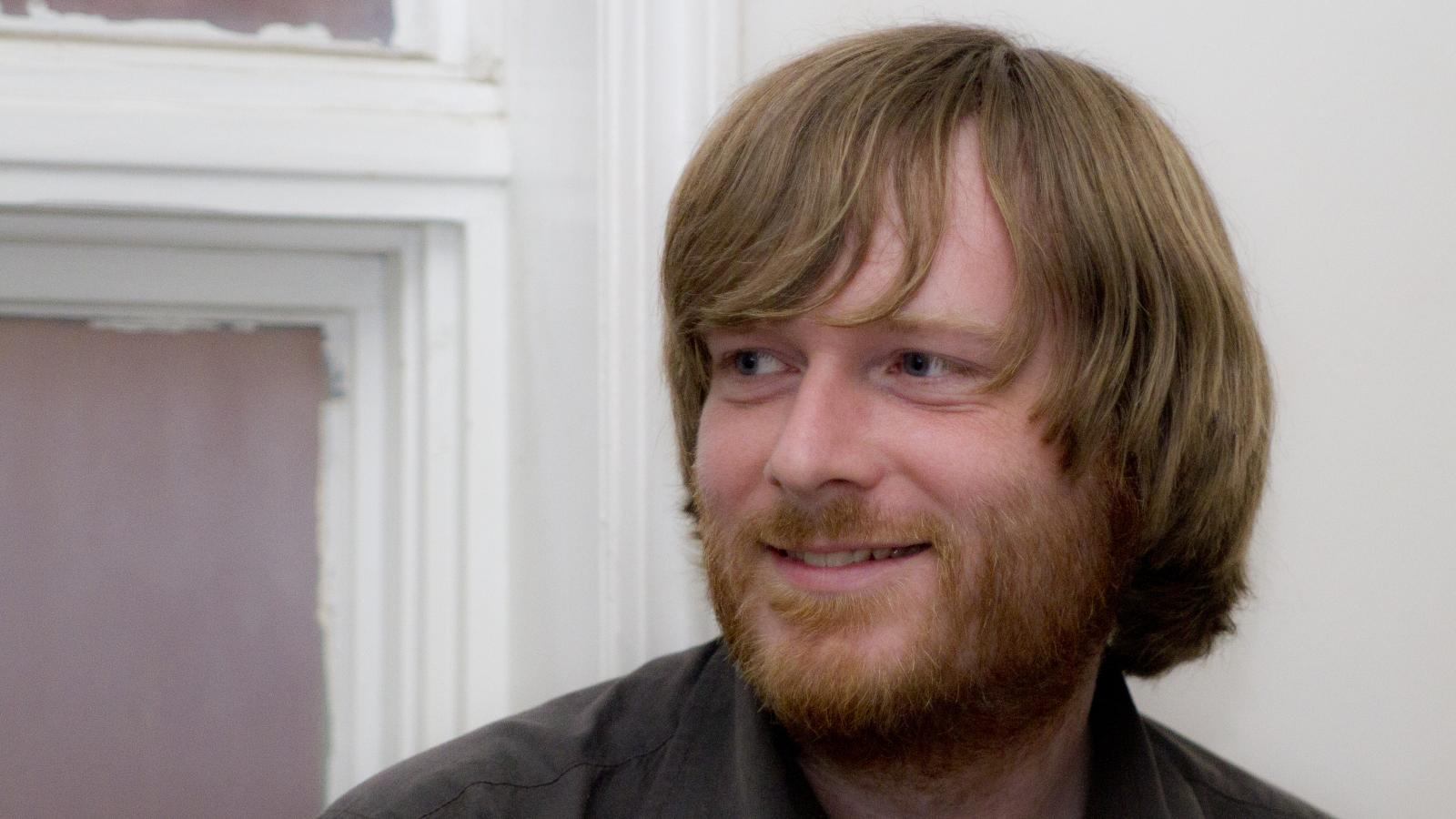
Boyer in May 2010

Brandon Boyer (born 1977) is a contributing editor to collaborative weblog Boing Boing. Boyer resides in Austin, Texas.

== Career ==
Boyer was born in 1977 in Sioux City, Iowa. From 1993 to 1996, Boyer wrote and performed songs on a Casio keyboard under the name Boy Genius. Tracks were featured on various CDs, including Bottlecap Records' "Green Light Go!" compilation.

Boyer began a record label, KittyBoo Records, out of Denton, Texas in 1995. KittyBoo released 3 records: the debut 7-inch from Poopiehead, a Bunnygrunt / Tullycraft split 7-inch, and the 7-inch soundtrack to J. Otto Seibold's Free Lunch children's book, with narration and instruments by singer, songwriter, Blue Man Group and They Might Be Giants collaborator and film-strip artist Brian Dewan.

Boyer was a contributor to both the print magazine and website of multi-format computer and video game magazine Edge from 2004 to 2006, and served as news editor for Gamasutra, an internationally recognized and Webby Award winning online community for video game developers which is owned and operated by Think Services (formerly CMP Media). In November 2008 he helped found Offworld, a video game blog owned by Boing Boing, where he served as editor through October 2009. In May 2010, Boyer was named Chairman of the Independent Games Festival. He stepped down in 2015, being replaced by Kelly Wallick.

In 2011, Brandon Boyer successfully ran a Kickstarter-campaign for an Offworld-successor called Venus Patrol. In the Kickstarter, exclusive rewards of amongst others Keita Takahashi, Adam Saltsman, Vlambeer and Superbrothers were offered to prospective subscribers. Venus Patrol launched on September 10, 2012. Boyer was diagnosed with cancer.

In 2011, Juegos Rancheros was co-founded by Boyer with support from Tim League, Drafthouse's CEO. The board of directors of Juegos Rancheros voted unanimously to dismiss Brandon Boyer on April 5, 2018, after accusations of abuse of women.
