= Knights and Bikes =

- Developer: Foam Sword
- Publisher: Double Fine Productions
- Designers: Rex Crowle; Moo Yu
- Programmer: Moo Yu
- Artist: Rex Crowle
- Writer: Rex Crowle
- Composer: Daniel Pemberton
- Engine: Unity
- Platforms: Microsoft Windows; Linux; MacOS; PlayStation 4; Nintendo Switch; Xbox One
- Release: Windows, Mac, Linux, PS4; August 27, 2019; Nintendo Switch; February 6, 2020; Xbox One; November 5, 2020
- Genre: Action-adventure
- Modes: Single-player, multiplayer

Knights and Bikes is a cooperative action-adventure game inspired by The Goonies and Secret of Mana. It is created by Foam Sword, a British indie game development company made up of former Media Molecule staff.

== Other media ==
Three tie-in novels have been written by children's author Gabrielle Kent, and published by indie publisher Knights Of. Knights and Bikes was published in August 2018; Rebel Bicycle Club was published in August 2019; Wheels of Legend was the final installment published in July 2020.

In 2019, Tiger Aspect Productions, then part of the Endemol group before being acquired by Banijay Group the following year, optioned the IP for an animated television series.

== Development ==
The Kickstarter for Knights and Bikes was launched on February 2, 2016, with a funding goal of £100,000. The goal was met and development continued on the game. The game was originally set to launch in April 2017, but was delayed until 2019. The game released for Windows, Mac, Linux and PS4 on August 27, 2019. A Nintendo Switch version was later released on February 6, 2020, and an Xbox One version was released on November 5, 2020.

== Reception ==
Reception

Aggregate score
| Aggregator | Score |
|---|---|
| Metacritic | PC: 79/100; PS4: 79/100; NS: 83/100 |

Review scores
| Publication | Score |
|---|---|
| Edge | 7/10 |
| Game Informer | 8/10 |
| GameSpot | 8/10 |
| PC Gamer (US) | 78% |

=== Accolades ===
The game was nominated for "Best Indie Game" at the 2019 Golden Joystick Awards, and won the award for "Game, Original Family" at the NAVGTR Awards; it was also nominated for "Audio Innovation of the Year" at the MCV/Develop Awards, and for the Matthew Crump Cultural Innovation Award at the SXSW Gaming Awards, and won the award for "Excellence in Visual Art" at the Independent Games Festival Awards, whereas it was nominated for "Excellence in Audio". In addition, it was nominated for "Best Debut" with Foam Sword Games at the Game Developers Choice Awards, and for "Best Sound Design for an Indie Game" at the 18th Annual G.A.N.G. Awards. It was also nominated for "Artistic Achievement", "British Game", "Debut Game", and "Family" at the 16th British Academy Games Awards.
