= Noby Noby Boy =

2009 video game

- Developer: Namco Bandai Games
- Publisher: Namco Bandai Games
- Designer: Keita Takahashi
- Platforms: PlayStation 3, iOS
- Release: PlayStation 3 February 19, 2009 iOS; February 18, 2010
- Genre: Action
- Modes: Single-player, multiplayer

Noby Noby Boy (Note: Japanese: のびのびBOY, Hepburn: Nobi Nobi Boy) is a video game for the PlayStation 3 and iOS, developed by Keita Takahashi and published by Namco Bandai. The PlayStation 3 game was released worldwide on February 19, 2009 while the iOS version was released the following year on February 18, 2010.

In the game, the player controls the character Boy, who can stretch his body. One of the meanings of "nobi" is "stretch" in Japanese. "Nobinobi" also means "carefree" in Japanese, so the game's title is a play on words with both of these meanings.

== Gameplay ==
The player takes control of a worm-like quadrupedal character referred to as Boy. Using the controller, the left analog stick moves the front of Boy while the right stick controls the back. By moving both ends in opposite directions, the player can stretch the Boy's abdomen to colossal lengths. The player can maneuver the Boy around its environment, interacting with stationary objects like houses, or AI-controlled characters such as barnyard animals.

The player accumulates points by how much they stretch during gameplay. These points can be submitted online via a character called Sun to another character called Girl. Points submitted online by players to Girl will be added cumulatively, causing Girl to stretch and unlock new levels. Beginning on Earth, GIRL has stretched to the Moon, Mars, Jupiter, Saturn, Neptune, Pluto and stretched back toward the Sun, and ultimately to Earth again, each unlocking new playable environments for Boy to stretch in. The Noby Noby Boy team expected players to take between one and two weeks of cumulative play time to reach the Moon. The Moon was reached on February 23, 2009, just four days after release. Mars was reached on May 23, 2009, and Jupiter was reached on November 20, 2009. As of January 19, 2011 GIRL had reached Saturn. In the week of December 25 to December 31, 2011, Uranus was reached. GIRL arrived at Neptune sometime around March 6, 2014. GIRL arrived at Pluto on November 23, 2015. The next destination was The Sun, for which GIRL had to turn around and repeat all the distance she had already stretched (albeit with the help of ratio-altering multipliers), followed by a short victory lap to unlock Mercury and Venus, which like The Sun were left behind when GIRL started her voyage, with a final arrival at Earth, back where GIRL started. GIRL completed her ultimate objective of uniting all the Solar System in harmony on December 14, 2015.

2489 days after the release of the game, the Sun was reached, triggering the official "end" of the game, though it is still possible to play.

=== Lucky Week ===
Takahashi chose specific weeks for "Lucky Week", which is a week where each day a random number is chosen and every time the player reports their length, it will be multiplied by that number. The first was from May 11 to May 22, 2009. There were rumors of another one in June as right after Lucky Week finished Keita wrote, "About Lucky week Thanks to everyones effort, GIRL has managed to stretch out a lot!! Still a long way to go in reaching Mars but we will see you in June for the time being!".

== Development ==
The game was first shown at a press conference held during Sony's PlayStation Premiere 2007 event in Tokyo. Takahashi showed a silver stretch hose with two pink balls at the ends, explaining that it wasn't a controller, but a visual aid to help explain the game. A 30-second demonstration clip featuring the character "Boy" was shown.

A playable prototype of the game was showcased at the GameCity 2007 International Interactive Entertainment Festival, where Takahashi delivered the festival's Vision Statement for the year. In the demo; as many as three Boys were shown interacting on a flat plane filled with barnyard animals; their elastic bodies were used to snap, whip, entangle, and drag themselves around. The Boys could swallow animals, distending the Boys' bellies, which could then be whipped to the posterior to be expelled.

A second gameplay demo was shown at the Tokyo Game Show 2008 Namco Bandai exhibit. Boy is guided through a two-dimensional maze with walls made up of colorful squares. As Boy is guided through the maze walls, collisions result in the blocks that make up the wall scattering. Once through the maze, the Boy was directed toward a game title screen made of the same blocks, which were then scattered. This confused many at the exhibit, since the demo seemed to contradict the previous gameplay engine. This gameplay has since been revealed to be a minigame accessible while the main game is paused.

Noby Noby Boy was originally developed on the Xbox 360 development kit but was eventually ported to the PlayStation 3. The reason behind this was that Takahashi preferred the symmetrical design of the analog sticks on the PlayStation 3 rather than those found in the Xbox 360's controller.

On April 29, 2009, Noby Noby Boy was updated to include offline multiplayer for up to 4 players. Also included in the update was a larger selection of in-game music, a new feature that audibly pronounces phonetically the name of any objects farted, a volume slider for fart sounds, new "hair styles" for Boy's house as well as new bird thinking poses. Additionally, a hidden feature referred to as SYNCHROBOY was added where if the player holds a certain button right before exiting Boy's house, another Boy will appear, mirroring the player's movements.

== Reception ==
Reception

Aggregate score
Aggregator	Score
Metacritic	75/100

Review scores
Publication	Score
1Up.com	B
Destructoid	4.5/10
Eurogamer	9/10
GameSpot	7.5/10
GameSpy	4/5
Hardcore Gamer	3.5/5
IGN	(UK) 9/10 (US) 6/10
PlayStation Official Magazine – UK	7/10
PALGN	7.5/10
Push Square	7/10
411Mania	7.2/10
Teletext GameCentral	8/10

The PlayStation 3 version received "generally favorable reviews" according to the review aggregation website Metacritic. As of May 2009, the same console version sold "about 100,000" units. Since the game's release, Takahashi had said that he was "not completely satisfied with the game".
