= Robin Hunicke =

American video game designer and producer (born 1973)

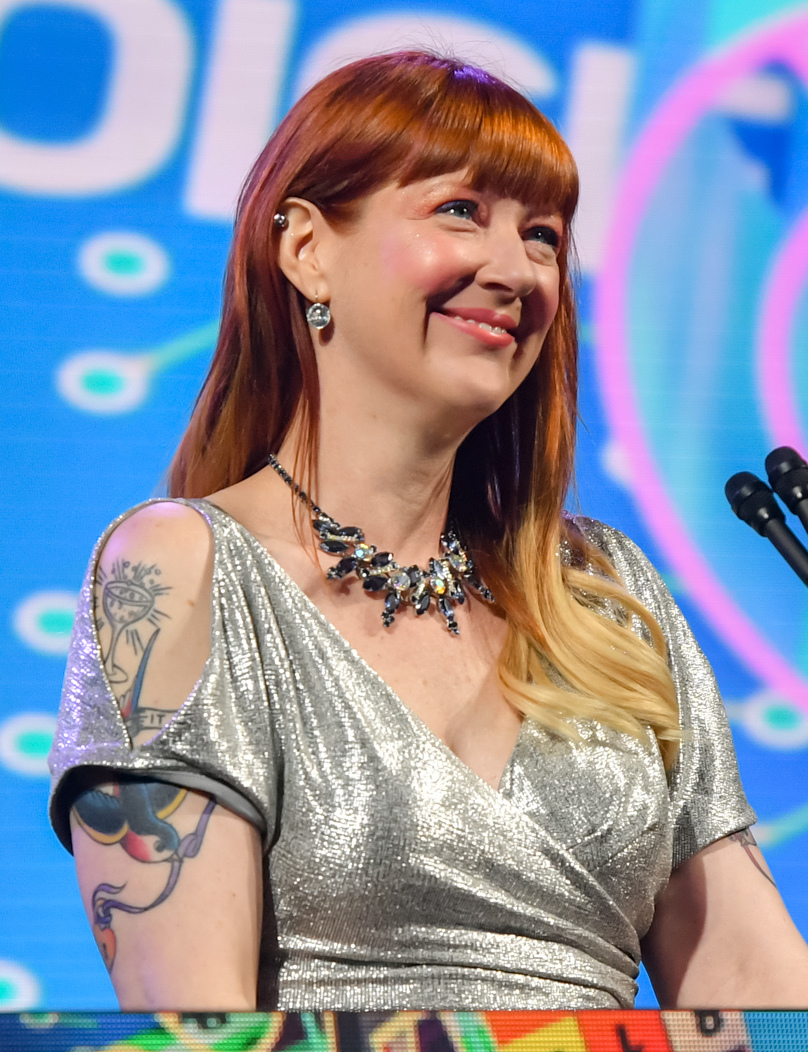
- Hunicke in 2018
- Born: March 15, 1973 (age 53); Albany, New York, U.S.
- Occupations: Game designer; producer
- Notable work: MySims; Boom Blox; Journey; Wattam
- Website: www.funomena.com

Robin Hunicke (/ˈhʌnɪki/; born March 15, 1973) is an American video game designer and producer. She was a professor of game design at UC Santa Cruz and the co-founder of Funomena.

Hunicke began her career at Electronic Arts where she worked on multiple games including MySims as Lead Designer and Boom Blox and its sequel as a Producer. After leaving EA, she was hired by thatgamecompany where she produced Journey, an online cooperative game for the PlayStation 3. After its completion, Hunicke joined Tiny Speck to develop the social MMORPG Glitch, teaming with Katamari Damacy creator and personal friend Keita Takahashi. Prior to the release of Glitch, Hunicke left Tiny Speck to co-found Funomena together with Martin Middleton, former teammate and engineer at thatgamecompany. In October 2012, Funomena announced their first project: "to build a game that takes data from a pedometer and does something fun with it." They announced two new games, Wattam (directed by Keita Takahashi) and Luna, "a tactile puzzle game set in a vibrant and sculptural story-book world", both of which have been released with Hunicke credited as executive producer.

Hunicke is recognized in the industry for her support of indie games, experimentation in game design, research in dynamic difficulty adjustment, and the advocacy of women within the games industry. She has been accused of emotionally abusing Funomena employees.

== Early life and education ==
Hunicke was born on March 15, 1973, in Albany, New York. She holds a B.A. degree from the University of Chicago and is finishing a PhD in Artificial Intelligence with a focus on Games and Game Design from Northwestern University.

== Career ==
=== Electronic Arts ===
Hunicke began her work with Electronic Arts at Maxis, where she became a designer for The Sims 2: Open for Business after meeting famed game designer and Sims director Will Wright. Following her work on The Sims 2, Hunicke went on to become the lead designer for MySims on the Nintendo Wii, and later, was a producer for Boom Blox and its sequel, Boom Blox: Bash Party.

=== thatgamecompany ===
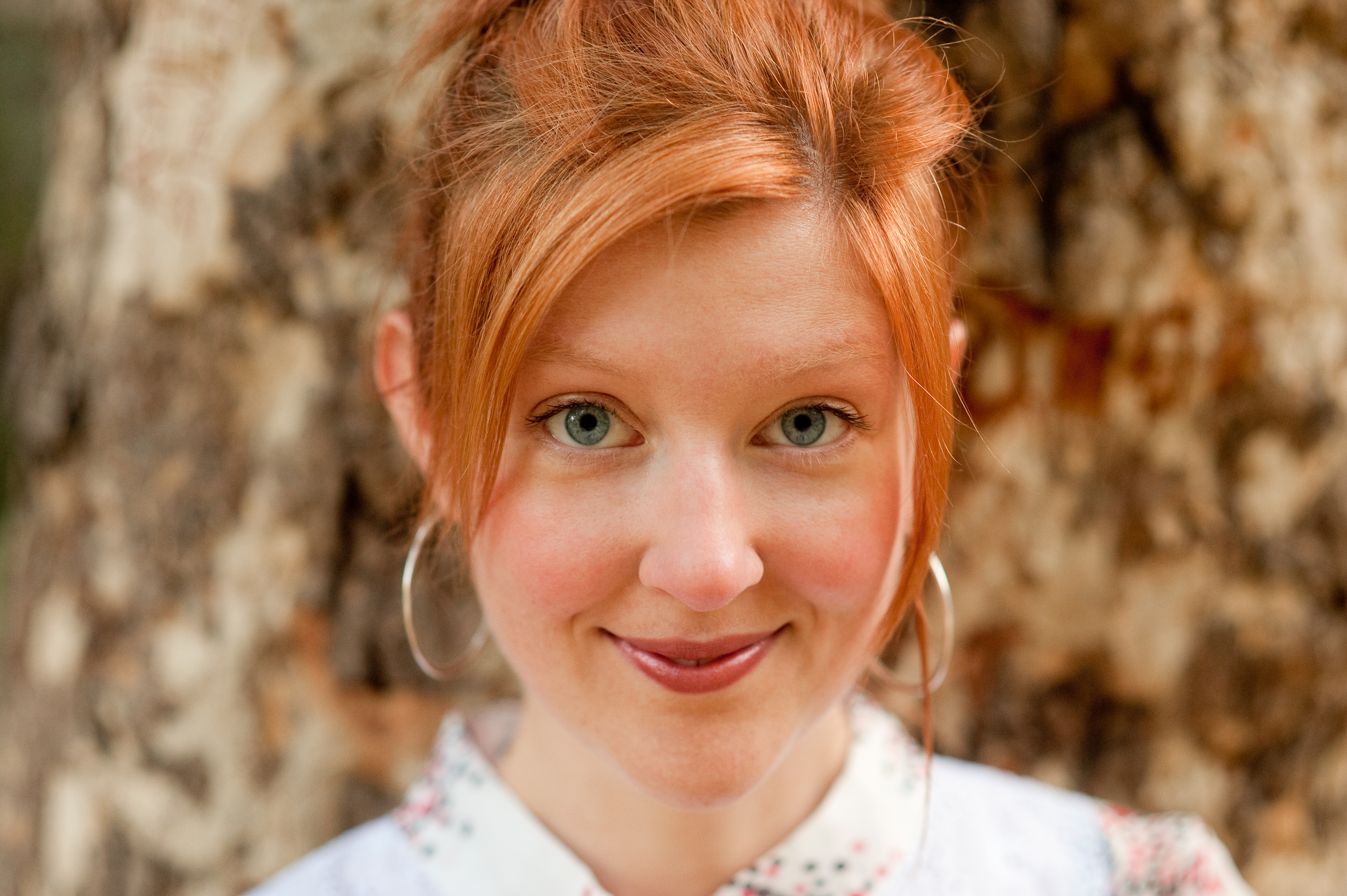
Hunicke in 2009

Following her work at Electronic Arts, Hunicke joined thatgamecompany as a producer. She joined the team in the early conceptual stages for the studio's third project Journey, a multiplayer cooperative adventure game released in early 2012.

=== Tiny Speck ===
After the release of Journey, Hunicke left thatgamecompany to join Tiny Speck to continue development of their social MMORPG Glitch.

=== Funomena ===
Prior to the release of Glitch, Hunicke left Tiny Speck to co-found Funomena together with Martin Middleton. They announced their first project in October 2012: "to build a game that takes data from a pedometer and does something fun with it." Their first video game is Luna, a VR-focused art game which is described as "a tactile puzzle game set in a vibrant and sculptural story-book world". They then developed Wattam, a spiritual successor of Bandai Namco's Katamari series directed by its creator, Keita Takahashi. It was released on PlayStation 4 and PC (via Epic Games Store) on December 17, 2019.

=== Emotional abuse allegations ===
In March 2022, allegations were made by anonymous former employees in a YouTube video released by People Make Games that Hunicke had emotionally abused Funomena staff, bringing up sensitive information about their personal lives during workplace discussions regarding performance. Hunicke later acknowledged this in a now-deleted series of tweets stating that she was sorry that people were hurt by her mistakes and was taking a break but did not respond to any specific contents of the report. Two weeks following the release of the report it was reported that Funomena was shutting down. In May 2022 a report by Fanbyte uncovered additional details including employees stating that they were unsure if the studio is closing down or secured outside funding and that the studio attempted to gain funds by attempting to becoming a work-for-hire company for companies that made content in Roblox. The report also stated that two days after Hunicke posted her Twitter apology, Hunicke and Funomena co-founder Martin Middleton told staff that there would be layoffs at the studio, and that Funomena would likely close due to People Make Games' video and its impact on the studio's ability to secure outside funding.

=== Conferences and events ===
Hunicke contributes to various video game industry conferences and events throughout the year. She is an organizer of the annual Game Design Workshop at the Game Developer's Conference, where she helps organize the event and teaches with designers Doug Church, Marc LeBlanc, Frank Lantz, Stone Librande, Clint Hocking and others. Hunicke is also an organizer of the Experimental Gameplay Sessions at GDC with Jonathan Blow, Doug Church, and Chris Hecker. Many successful games have made their first public appearance at the session, including Jonathan Blow's Braid and Valve's Portal. Hunicke is also an organizer of IndieCade, an annual festival dedicated to independent game development.

Hunicke is a founding member of the IGDA Education SIG, has participated in the Indie Game Jam, helps with the Global Game Jam, teaches at UCSC, is a judge for the Independent Games Festival and a co-head of the Experimental Gameplay Workshop.

=== Research ===
In her studies, Hunicke researches dynamic difficulty adjustment. She is also interested in how "the notions of fate, meaning, and consequence can be communicated via video games".

=== MDA framework ===
From 2001 to 2004, Hunicke, Marc LeBlanc, and Robert Zubek created the Mechanics-Dynamics-Aesthetics framework to focus and improve game analysis. The framework categorizes the many aspects of a game as Mechanics, Dynamics, or Aesthetics, and outlines the inverse perspectives of designer and player. From the perspective of the designer, the Mechanics generate Dynamics which generate Aesthetics. From the perspective of the player, the player experiences the game through the Aesthetics, which are provided by Dynamics that emerge from the game Mechanics.

== Awards and recognition ==
On May 21, 2008, Hunicke was chosen for Gamasutra's "Gamasutra 20", "honoring the Top 20 women working in the video game industry". In 2009, Microsoft awarded Hunicke the Women in Gaming Award for Design. She also earned a spot on the Hot 100 Game Developers of 2009 list by Edge Magazine.

To date, the various titles Hunicke has worked on have garnered awards, such as the "Online Innovation Award" for Journey at the Game Developers Choice Online Awards and a BAFTA award for "Best Casual Game of 2008" for Boom Blox.

In addition to awards received, she is also a contest judge for Will Wright's Proxi art challenge.
