= Wattam =

- Developer(s): Funomena
- Publisher(s): Annapurna Interactive
- Designer(s): Keita Takahashi
- Platform(s): PlayStation 4; Windows
- Release: December 17, 2019
- Genre(s): Puzzle-platform
- Mode(s): Single-player, multiplayer

Wattam is a 2019 puzzle-platform game developed by Funomena and published by Annapurna Interactive. It was designed by Keita Takahashi, creator of Katamari Damacy, and was released for PlayStation 4 and Windows on December 17.

== Gameplay ==
The game is played either solo or co-op, and consists of befriending other inhabitants of the world, including trees, flowers, rocks, toilets, poop, mouths, and more by holding hands, uncovering secrets, playing minigames, and solving puzzles. Characters each have unique melodies, which can be combined.

== Development ==
Originally revealed in December 2014 as a PlayStation 4 exclusive, Wattam was to be published by Sony Interactive Entertainment and developed jointly by Funomena and Santa Monica Studio. However, it was revealed in October 2016 that Sony were no longer involved with the game. In August 2017, Annapurna Interactive was announced as the new publisher, and that it would additionally be released for Microsoft Windows.

Regarding Wattam, designer Keita Takahashi said that he was "always" trying to make a game that makes people notice how "our ordinary life is great".

Wattam had a troubled development at Funomena. Takahashi quarreled with studio co-founder Robin Hunicke over the game's design and production. Hunicke withdrew from active involvement in the game's development to focus on running the company. After Sony ended its co-development with Funomena, the studio announced layoffs. The game would ultimately spend over five years in development.

== Reception ==
Reception

Aggregate score
Aggregator	Score
Metacritic	PC: 73/100; PS4: 72/100

Review scores
Publication	Score
Destructoid	8.5/10
Edge	7/10
Game Informer	7.25/10
GameSpot	7/10
IGN	8/10
Jeuxvideo.com	14/20
PlayStation Official Magazine – UK	9/10
PC Gamer (US)	76/100
USgamer	4/5

Wattam received "mixed or average reviews" from critics upon release according to review aggregator website Metacritic.

The game was nominated for the "Family", "Game Design", and "Music" categories at the 16th British Academy Games Awards.
