= Simon & Marcy =

- Adventure Time episode
- Episode no.: Season 5 Episode 14
- Directed by: Adam Muto (Note: Supervising director); Nick Jennings (Note: Art director)
- Written by: Cole Sanchez; Rebecca Sugar; Adam Muto (uncredited)
- Story by: Patrick McHale; Kent Osborne; Pendleton Ward
- Production code: 1014-118
- Original air date: March 25, 2013
- Running time: 11 minutes

Guest appearance
- Ava Acres as Young Marcy

Episode chronology
← Previous "The Great Birdman"	Next → "A Glitch Is a Glitch"
- Adventure Time season 5

"Simon & Marcy" is the fourteenth episode of the fifth season of the American animated television series Adventure Time. The episode was written and storyboarded by Cole Sanchez and Rebecca Sugar, from a story by Patrick McHale, Kent Osborne, and Pendleton Ward. It originally aired on Cartoon Network on March 25, 2013, preceded by a re-run of the fourth season episode "I Remember You", and as such was advertised as a half-hour special.

The series follows the adventures of Finn (voiced by Jeremy Shada), a human boy, and his best friend and adoptive brother Jake (voiced by John DiMaggio), a dog with magical powers to change shape and grow and shrink at will. In this episode, Marceline the Vampire Queen (voiced by Olivia Olson) reveals to Finn and Jake that 996 years prior to the events of the series, she and the Ice King (voiced by Tom Kenny)—then a human named Simon Petrikov—wandered the post-apocalyptic land after the cataclysmic Mushroom War.

"Simon & Marcy" was the last episode to feature Sugar as a storyboard artist. She left after completing the episode in order to create her own series, Steven Universe. The episode received critical acclaim; many praised its balance of humor and emotion, as well as its exploration of the Ice King's character. The episode was viewed by 2.6 million viewers and received a 0.6 rating among adults between the ages of 18 and 49. The episode was later nominated for a Primetime Emmy Award for Short-format Animation at the 65th Primetime Emmy Awards, but lost to Mickey Mouse episode "Croissant de Triomphe".

== Plot ==
=== Background ===
In the context of the series, Marceline the Vampire Queen is a thousand-year-old vampire. The Ice King is a recurring antagonist of the series, and frequently kidnaps princesses throughout Ooo; although he is often at odds with Finn and Jake, he is generally not a serious threat. In the fourth season episode "I Remember You", it was revealed that Marceline and the Ice King had originally met following the events of the mysterious Mushroom War, a cataclysmic conflict that destroyed modern human society.

=== Events ===
While playing basketball at Marceline's house, Finn and Jake are surprised to learn that Marceline invited the Ice King to play as well. After the two inquire, Marceline reveals that she had known the Ice King when he was still a human man named Simon Petrikov, 996 years before the timeframe of the episode.

The episode then flashes back 996 years, following the destruction of civilization in the mysterious Mushroom War. Simon and Marceline—who Simon affectionately called Marcy—wander the outskirts of a destroyed and unidentified city. After hearing a rustling from the woods, Simon is forced to put on the mysterious ice crown. The crown gives the wearer ice-related magic powers but also drains them of their sanity. Using the power of the crown, Simon freezes what was making the rustling: a deer. Marcy eventually manages to snap Simon out of his bout of craziness, and later that night Simon sings the theme song from the sitcom Cheers to cheer her up. While laughing, Marcy begins to cough, and Simon realizes she is in need of medicine.

The two make their way into the ruins of the city looking for chicken soup in order to cure Marcy's illness. Inside the ruins of a soupery, Simon and Marcy run into some sort of mutated slime-creature, but Simon manages to knock it out with his crown. The two flee and eventually discover what they believe is a food cart. Hopeful, Simon approaches it, only to realize that the vehicle is actually a mobile clam delivery service. Frustrated, Simon kicks the doors, which alerts several more slime creatures inside the vehicle. Simon, scared and hoping to protect Marcy, pushes the vehicle off of a bridge, and the resulting sound alerts a horde of the mutants. Simon and Marcy run into an alley, but are trapped. As a last resort, Simon places Marcy in an abandoned car and puts the crown on his head. In order to maintain his sanity, he sings the theme to Cheers while he unleashes a blast of ice which stops the mutant hordes in their tracks. Simon is able to eventually snap out of his insanity, and a sentient mass of bubblegum subsequently gives him a can of chicken soup. Marcy tells Simon that she loves him. Simon hugs her back saying he loves her too, but calls her Gunter.

In the present, Marceline concludes her tale, to a shocked Finn and Jake and an oblivious Ice King. Marceline notes that Marcy and Simon "lived happily ever after", and Finn, Jake, and herself watch as the Ice King dunks several baskets, still unable to remember his former self.

== Production ==
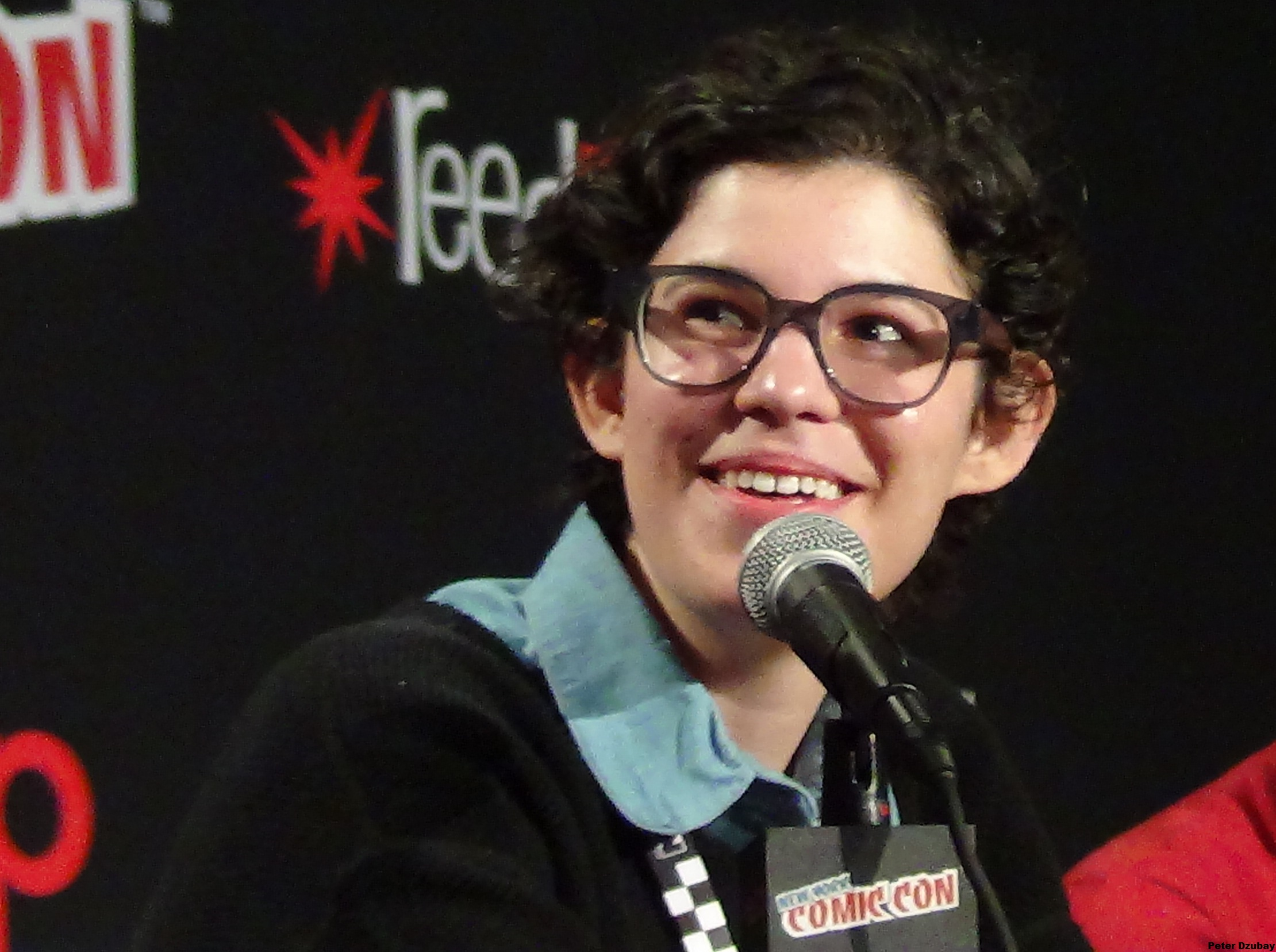
"Simon & Marcy" was co-written and storyboarded by Rebecca Sugar (pictured) and marked her final episode for the series.

"Simon & Marcy" was written and storyboarded by Cole Sanchez and Rebecca Sugar, from a story by Patrick McHale, Kent Osborne, and Pendleton Ward. Adam Muto served as the episode's supervising director, while Nick Jennings handled the art direction. When the Adventure Time production staff was pitching the storyboard for this episode to Cartoon Network, they described it as "The Road 'except for kids'". Reportedly, there was extensive "back and forth" between the production crew and the network before the episode was eventually greenlit.

This was the last episode of Adventure Time to feature Sugar as a writer and storyboard artist. She left the series after this episode in order to focus her attention towards her own series, Steven Universe. In an interview with Indiewire, Sugar explained that up until storyboarding "Simon & Marcy" she had been concurrently working on both Adventure Time and Steven Universe. However, when it came time to storyboard this episode, she realized the workload was too much and that she had to step down from Adventure Time in order to focus on her own show. According to Sugar, Muto also contributed "additional scenes" to the episode; she wrote on her official Tumblr that "he really did a lot on this one and put it over the top." She also noted that "everyone [working on the series] was pitching in to make this one special".

The episode features the voice of Ava Acres, who portrays the young version of Marceline. Acres had previously appeared in the third season episode "Memory of a Memory". As mentioned above, the episode makes notable use of the 1982 song "Where Everybody Knows Your Name" by Gary Portnoy—better known as the theme to the sitcom Cheers. According to Sugar's father, Rob, on his official YouTube channel, the use of the song started merely as a placeholder. However, as the episode developed, Sugar decided to keep it in the episode. This was notable, as it required that the show purchase the rights to use the original. Muto later revealed that "According to Our New Arrivals", the theme from the sitcom Mr. Belvedere, was also in the running.

== Reception ==
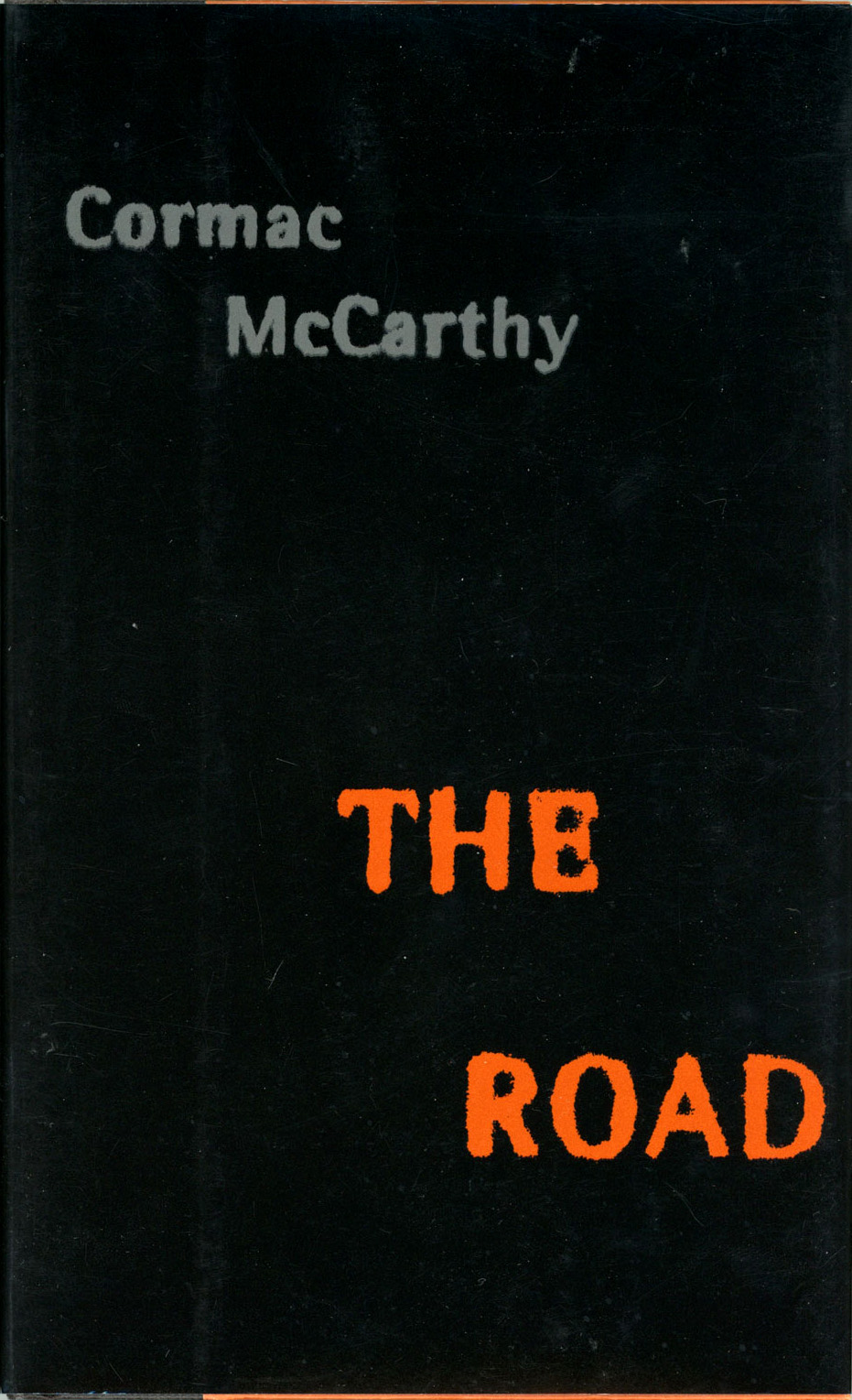
Eric Kohn of IndieWire compared the plot of the episode to Cormac McCarthy's novel The Road.

"Simon & Marcy" aired on March 25, 2013, preceded by a re-run of the fourth season episode "I Remember You", and as such was advertised by Cartoon Network as a "half-hour special". The episode was watched by 2.6 million viewers, and received a 0.6 rating in the 18–49 demographic. This means that it was seen by 0.6 percent of all 18- to 49-year-olds at the time of the broadcast. The episode was the 37th most-watched cable program in the 18–49 demographic on the night it aired. The episode first saw physical release as part of the 2013 Jake the Dad DVD, which included 16 episodes from the series' fourth and fifth seasons.

"Simon & Marcy" was critically acclaimed. Oliver Sava of The A.V. Club awarded the episode an "A", and wrote that "this episode is all about finding [a home] in a world that has been completely devastated." He was particularly pleased with the manner in which the episode balanced serious ideas with comedy, writing that—while the episode was not "super heavy" on laughs—humorous moments like Simon pushing the "Clambulance" off a bridge helped to "lighten the mood" in an otherwise dark episode. The site later named the episode one of the ten additional installments of the series that illustrates that "emotional complexity" lies "beneath Adventure Time's weirdness". The staff of TV.com wrote that "it's sort of amazing how Adventure Time has transformed the Ice King from an irritating antagonist to one of the most tragic figures on television". Furthermore, they felt that the episode successfully balanced excitement and comedy, and that the use of the Cheers theme song were "incredibly poignant".

After the episode aired, Eric Kohn of IndieWire published an article explaining why "'Adventure Time' is the best Sci-Fi show on TV right now". He praised the way in which the episode "deepen[ed] the world [of Ooo] in all kinds of morbidly fascinating ways." Furthermore, he compared it to Cormac McCarthy's book The Road, specifically citing the similarities between the mutant creatures in the episode and the "demented people" in the latter. Kohn ultimately concluded that the series' "willingness to contemplate [the themes of the episode] while sticking to its unique combination of silliness and haunting beauty routinely transforms the show into a wondrous genre experiment."

Kendra Beltran of MTV Geek wrote that the episode "pushed Ice King and Marceline's history even more into the pits of your heart and twisted it ever so." She ultimately concluded that the episode was "a touching notch in the Adventure Time realm". Novelist Lev Grossman, in an interview with NPR praised the backstory of the Ice King and the exploration of his condition, noting that his origin is "psychologically plausible". Grossman praised the way the series was able to tackle the issues of mental illness, saying: "It's very affecting. My dad has been going through having Alzheimer's, and he's forgotten so much about who he used to be. And I look at him and think this cartoon is about my father dying."

The episode was later nominated for a Primetime Emmy Award for Short-format Animation at the 65th Primetime Emmy Awards, but lost to the Mickey Mouse episode "Croissant de Triomphe".
