= Gotcha! (Adventure Time) =

- Adventure Time episode
- Episode no.: Season 4 Episode 12
- Directed by: Larry Leichliter (Note: Director); Adam Muto (Note: Creative director); Nick Jennings (Note: Art director)
- Written by: Cole Sanchez; Rebecca Sugar
- Story by: Patrick McHale; Kent Osborne; Pendleton Ward
- Production code: 1008-090
- Original air date: June 18, 2012
- Running time: 11 minutes

Episode chronology
← Previous "Beyond This Earthly Realm"	Next → "Princess Cookie"
- Adventure Time season 4

"Gotcha!" is the twelfth episode of the fourth season of the American animated television series Adventure Time. The episode was written and storyboarded by Cole Sanchez and Rebecca Sugar, from a story by Patrick McHale, Kent Osborne, and Pendleton Ward. It originally aired on Cartoon Network on June 18, 2012.

The series follows the adventures of Finn (voiced by Jeremy Shada), a human boy, and his best friend and adoptive brother Jake (voiced by John DiMaggio), a dog with magical powers to change shape and grow and shrink at will. In this episode, Lumpy Space Princess (voiced by Ward) goes undercover working for Finn and Jake in order to do research for her tell-all memoir about men. She eventually learns that Finn is selfless, which makes him "hot on the inside".

For inspiration, Sugar and Sanchez watched poorly made romantic comedies with Osborne during their lunch breaks. "Gotcha!" was watched by 2.392 million viewers, and received largely positive critical reviews, with Oliver Sava of The A.V. Club applauding the episode's dialogue and voice acting.

== Plot ==
After boasting to Turtle Princess (voiced by Steve Little) that no man is immune to her beauty, Lumpy Space Princess (voiced by Pendleton Ward) promises to seduce Finn and write a tell-all book about her experience. After convincing Finn and Jake to allow her to be their "adventure secretary", Lumpy Space Princess tries to woo Finn. However, most of what she interprets as signs of successful seduction are mundane aspects of Finn's altruistic character, such as his willingness to fetch her old spaghetti for dinner.

The next day, Finn, Jake, and Lumpy Space Princess journey to the Mystery Mountains to investigate the Loch of Phantoms. After crossing the water, the trio enter into a cave system, where they find a mirror-like portal. Lumpy Space Princess accidentally falls through, wherein she is attacked by phantom versions of Finn. The real Finn, however, manages to break through using his sword, and Finn and Jake destroy the phantoms. Lumpy Space Princess, realizing that Finn is "beautiful on the inside" due to his altruism and heroic character, completely rewrites her book, much to Turtle Princess's excitement.

== Production ==
"Gotcha!" was written and storyboarded by Cole Sanchez and Rebecca Sugar, from a story developed by series creator Pendleton Ward, Patrick McHale, and Kent Osborne. The episode was directed by Larry Leichliter. For inspiration, Sugar and Sanchez watched poorly made romantic comedies with Osborne during their lunch breaks. While Sanchez felt that these movies were "inspiring", Sugar felt that they were "draining". While the episode was being storyboarded, Ward was under stress because his family was in town. When Sugar explained that she wanted to make Lumpy Space Princess realize that she was attracted to Finn, Ward—being extremely stressed out—uncharacteristically protested, declaring: "They're both me. I'm Lumpy Space Princess and Finn." He did not want any form of romance to come between the two characters due to his personal connection with them. However, when Ward was recording his lines, he felt that the story and dialogue was funny; he later noted he was just having an off day.

The lake and the mirrors villains were Dungeons & Dragons inspired, according to Ward. In the DVD commentary for the episode, he applauded Sugar's application of them. She, in turn noted that she "love[s] mirror enemies … and doppelgänger enemies of all kinds." During the scenes taking place inside the mirror room, Sugar made sure the mirrors were reflecting everything properly, which took extra work. Because the word "lumps" were used over and over in the original storyboard, Ward and the crew began to think of new, unique colloquialism for Lumpy Space Princess to use when referring to her lumps. One of the words substituted was "cobras".

== Reception ==
"Gotcha!" aired on Cartoon Network on June 18, 2012. The episode was watched by 2.392 million viewers, and scored a 0.33 rating in the 18- to 49-year-old demographic, according to Nielsen ratings. The episode first saw physical release as part of the 2013 DVD, Jake the Dad, which included 16 episodes from the series' fourth and fifth seasons. It was later re-released as part of the complete fourth season DVD in October 2014.

Oliver Sava of The A.V. Club awarded the episode a "B". Sava felt that the episode's final line of dialogue—featuring Jake telling Lumpy Space Princess that she's wearing garbage, only for Lumpy Space Princess to respond, "Gotcha!"—"perfectly encapsulates the tone of this episode". Lumpy Space Princess, according to Sava, is "adorable but simultaneously off-putting", which "translates to lots of laughs". Sava lauded Ward and Little's voice work, noting that "the repetition of their catchphrase 'Hey, girl!' is the episode’s best running gag, if only because Pendleton Ward and Steve Little give the characters such great voices." Finally, Sava was appreciative of the background music featured in the episode, writing, "The quick little bursts of music this week set the tone for the scenes really well, especially the Bon Iver-like final number as LSP has her final kinda-revelation."
