= Rebecca Sugar =

American animator, writer and musician (born 1987)

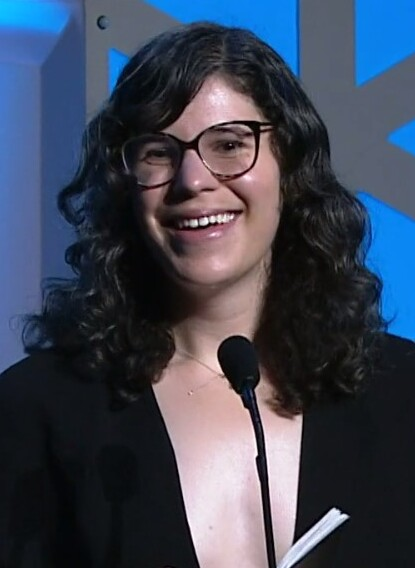
- Sugar at the 2019 Peabody Awards
- Born: July 9, 1987 (age 39); Silver Spring, Maryland, U.S.
- Education: School of Visual Arts (BFA)
- Occupations: Animator; storyboard artist; writer; producer; director; musician
- Years active: 2007−present
- Known for: Steven Universe
- Spouse: Ian Jones-Quartey (m. 2019)

Rebecca Sugar (born July 9, 1987) is an American animator, storyboard artist, screenwriter, producer, director, and musician. A pioneer of LGBTQ representation in children's television, she (Note: Sugar uses she/her and they/them pronouns. This article uses she/her for consistency.) is best known for being the creator of the Cartoon Network series Steven Universe, making her the first non-binary person to independently create a series for the network; prior to coming out as non-binary, Sugar was described as the first woman to do so. Prior to the premiere of Steven Universe in 2013, Sugar was a writer and storyboard artist on the animated television series Adventure Time. Her work on the two series has earned her seven Primetime Emmy Award nominations in total.

Sugar is bisexual, non-binary, and genderqueer, using both she/her and they/them pronouns. Sugar's queerness has served as an inspiration for her to stress the importance of LGBT representation in the arts, especially in children's entertainment.

== Early life and education ==
Sugar was raised in the Sligo Park Hills area of Silver Spring, Maryland. She simultaneously attended Montgomery Blair High School and the Visual Arts Center at Albert Einstein High School (where she was an arts semifinalist in the Presidential Scholar competition and won Montgomery County's prestigious Ida F. Haimovicz Visual Arts Award), both of which are located in Maryland. While at Blair, she drew several comics (called "The Strip" for the school's newspaper, Silver Chips) which won first place for comics in the Newspaper Individual Writing and Editing Contest. "The Strip" ran a comic challenging MCPS's new grading policy from 2005. She went on to attend the School of Visual Arts in New York. Sugar majored in animation and graduated with a Bachelor of Fine Arts degree in 2009.

According to Sugar's father Rob, Rebecca and her younger brother Steven were raised with what he called "Jewish sensibilities", and both siblings observed the lighting of Hanukkah candles with their parents via Skype.

== Career ==
=== Early work ===
Sugar played an important role in the creation of nockFORCE, a cartoon series created by Ian Jones-Quartey and Jim Gisriel and launched in 2007 on YouTube. In particular, she contributed to the cartoon's backgrounds and characters.

During her time at the School of Visual Arts, Sugar directed short animated films, including Johnny Noodleneck (2008). In 2009, she wrote and animated Singles, in which frequent collaborator Ian Jones-Quartey acted as an assistant animator, assistant inker and voice actor on the project, while Sugar's brother Steven Sugar acted as an assistant colorist. She completed this film as her thesis and later officially released on August 22, 2025, on YouTube under her account.

In 2010, Sugar published her first graphic novel, Pug Davis, featuring an astronaut dog and his gay sidekick Blouse. She is also known for her comic "Don't Cry for Me, I'm Already Dead", a story about two brothers whose shared love of The Simpsons takes a tragic turn.

=== Television ===
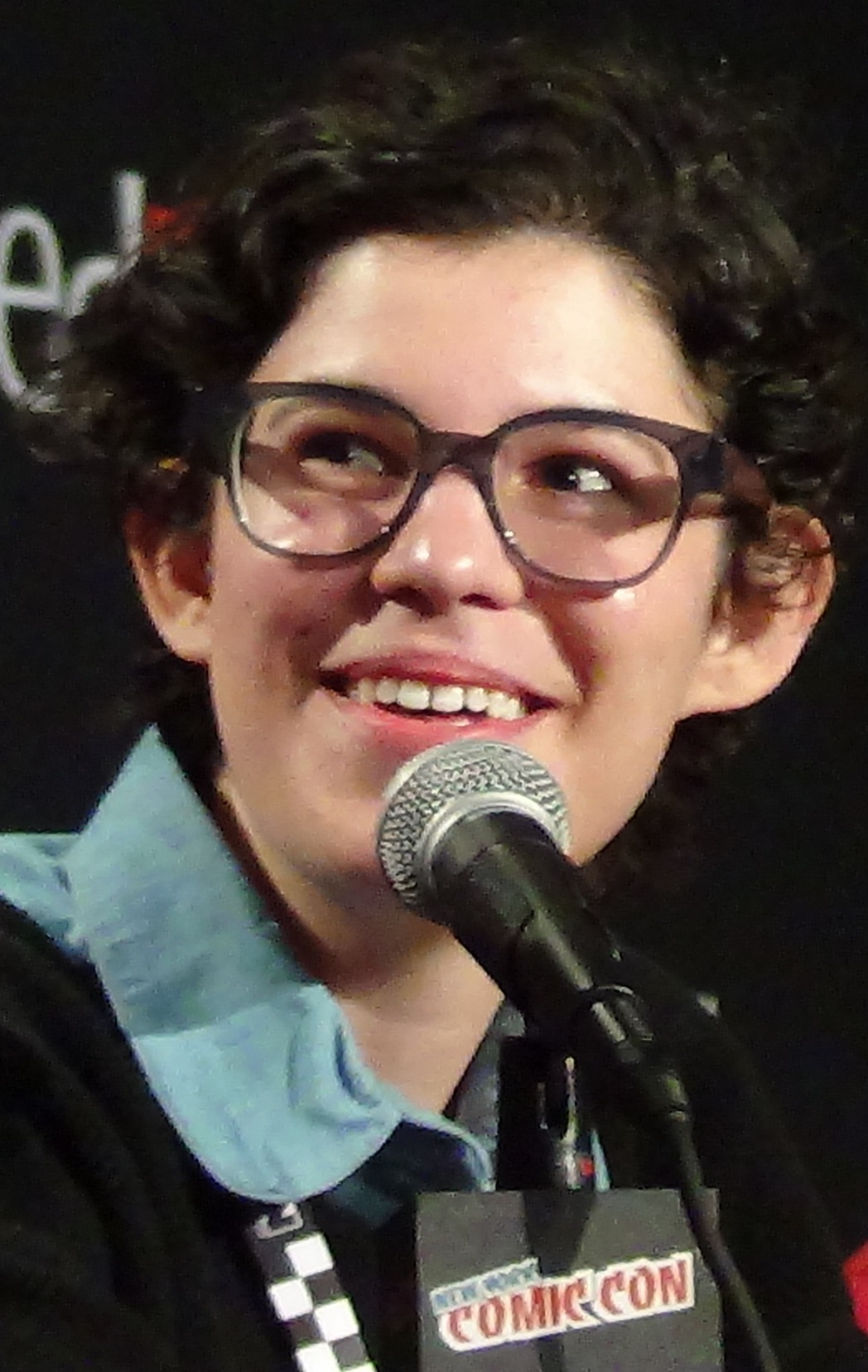
Sugar at the 2014 New York Comic Con

==== Adventure Time and Steven Universe ====
Sugar first joined the crew of Adventure Time as a storyboard revisionist during the show's first season. Due to the quality of her work, within a month of being hired she was promoted to a storyboard artist, making her debut during the production of the second season. Her first episode was "It Came from the Nightosphere". While working on the show, she was encouraged by the creative team to put her "own life experiences into the character of Marceline". As she put it in an interview with Paper Magazine, she connected with indie and underground comic artists who worked on the show, like Pendleton Ward, Patrick McHale and Adam Muto, who told her to do what she would do when drawing comics and to not hold anything back. She stated that some of the changes in animation for years to come were inspired by what the show was able to do by being "very artist-driven", by independent comic artists like herself.

Production for Steven Universe began while Sugar was still working on Adventure Time. She continued working on Adventure Time until the show's fifth season, whereupon she left in order to focus on Steven Universe. Her last episode for Adventure Time was "Simon & Marcy"; following that episode, working on both series simultaneously "became impossible to do". She had also previously encountered difficulty in the production of the Adventure Time episode "Bad Little Boy". Sugar returned temporarily to write the song "Everything Stays" for the seventh season miniseries Stakes, and the song "Time Adventure" for the series finale, Come Along with Me. Sugar returned for the Adventure Time spin off Fionna and Cake to write the songs "Part of the Madness" and "Cake on the Loose".

She was an executive producer for Steven Universe for its entire run, and a storyboard artist for several of its episodes; the series premiered on November 4, 2013, and concluded on January 21, 2019. She directed the full-length television movie taking place after the fifth season of Steven Universe, called Steven Universe: The Movie, which premiered on September 2, 2019, on Cartoon Network. The movie was followed by an epilogue limited series titled Steven Universe Future, also with Sugar as executive producer, which premiered on December 7, 2019 and concluded on March 27, 2020.

Between October 2020 and April 2021, the Cartoon Network YouTube channel released four anti-racism PSAs featuring characters from Steven Universe that were developed by Sugar and Ian Jones-Quartey.

In June 2024, it was announced that Sugar would write a new Adventure Time movie alongside fellow franchise alums Adam Muto and Patrick McHale, marking her return to the franchise.

On June 11, 2025, at an Annecy International Animation Film Festival event, it was announced that a sequel series to Steven Universe, entitled Steven Universe: Lars of the Stars, was in development with Prime Video, with Cartoon Network Studios producing it, while Sugar and Jones-Quartey will be executive producers. During the event, Sugar said she missed her world and characters, and said she couldn't wait to share the series and thanked everyone for their support. Sugar also told The Wrap that the Steven Universe characters and world are important to her, said she was "thrilled" to do the series, and said the biggest part for her was that she is "co-creating it with Ian Jones-Quartey," and noted that all she wants to do is "make cartoons with him."

==== Amphibia and animated films ====
In the Amphibia episode "Froggy Little Christmas", a 22-minute Christmas special which aired on November 27, 2021, Sugar voiced a street performer who sang a musical number which Sugar had written. Sugar was not credited for her contribution to the episode. Matt Braly, the creator of Amphibia, praised her song as "really amazing" and saying that it had been stuck in his head and that of the crew for months. Her role in the episode was confirmed by the series art book, saying that the song she wrote was meant to "bring the story together thematically."

In December 2023, it was announced that Sony Pictures Animation was developing a fantasy-adventure film directed by Matt Braly, with the script written by Sugar and Braly. In February 2026, Braly announced on social media that the film, about a teenage boy traveling to a world filled with Thai spirits before he undergoes an important life-altering medical operation, and inspired by his own life story and background, was scrapped at Sony Pictures Animation in early 2025, with the studio determining that the film wasn't "commercial enough" to produce. In May 2026, Braly announced that a Thai animation studio, THE MONK Studios, had acquired rights to the film, under the name "Afterworld: กลับบ้าน", but that it was not funded, in production, or greenlit, but that the studio would be at Annecy trying to get "potential partners and investors". He also said that he was stepping aside a director, focusing on Clara And The Below, until the studio can "secure the means" to produce the film, and that no A.I. would be used in the film's production.

On June 12, 2025, Adult Swim announced that Sugar alongside Ian Jones-Quartey, Patrick McHale, and Pendleton Ward were developing an animated special under the title "The Elephant" slated for a December release.

It was announced, on October 6, 2025, that Sugar would be directing, and writing, a film about the Moomins, co-produced by Annapurna Animation and Moomin Characters, with Julia Pistor, a producer known for The Magician's Elephant, The SpongeBob SquarePants Movie, and other films, tapped as a producer.

=== Music career ===
In 2018, Sugar was featured in R&B singer Gallant's 2018 song "TOOGOODTOBETRUE", along with Sufjan Stevens.

On September 17, 2023, Sugar announced on social media her first solo release, an EP titled Spiral Bound, which was released on November 3. The album was reportedly inspired by "three years of daily journaling and sketching in spiral-bound notebooks" as well as the "process of healing from extreme burnout and unresolved trauma." Sugar later reflected that it was initially challenging to write a song for herself rather than a character and that the album broke from her experiences of creating "art that [was] a quest for perfection".

In February 2025, a new song by Sugar titled "Giraffe Song" appeared in a trailer for the video game To a T, designed by Katamari series creator Keita Takahashi. On August 29, 2025, Sugar released her second EP, Lonely Magic, with an animated music video for the song "Ice Water," directed and storyboarded by Sugar, releasing the same day. Prior to its release, she said that the album would have "true songs about magic." Sugar discussed the album at an invitation-only event at the School of Visual Arts that November comprising a panel with Jones-Quartey and other alumni, a screening of three music videos by Sugar, and an acoustic live performance.

=== Other work ===
In 2015, Sugar designed the album cover of True Romance for Estelle, the voice of Garnet on Steven Universe.

In December 2016, comic book publisher Youth in Decline featured Sugar's sketches and story notes for her unpublished comic Margo in Bed as issue #14 of the art/comics anthology series Frontier.

== Themes and influences ==
Sugar has discussed the importance of creating LGBTQ representation and content, especially in children's entertainment. On Cameron Esposito's podcast Queery, Sugar stated, "I want to champion LGBTQIA, all of it, content ... in G-Rated, family entertainment. I want to do that forever". She also explained how Steven Universe has helped her come to terms with her own identity as bisexual and non-binary. She believes that early and positive exposure to the LGBTQ community can help queer identifying children avoid experiencing shame in their own identities.

As for influences, Sugar has cited Whisper of the Heart as her "absolute favorite" film and as a major influence on her work, even providing an introduction for screenings in July 2019. She also cited the anime series Revolutionary Girl Utena as an "epiphany" for her, by playing with "the semiotics of gender" and called it beautiful, funny, and extreme, having a huge influence on her, and noted the "huge Takarazuka Theater influence" in Steven Universe. Additionally, she described Neon Genesis Evangelion as a major influence, while her series Steven Universe has references to Sailor Moon, Dragon Ball, Tengen Toppa Gurren Lagann, Captain Harlock, Kiki's Delivery Service, and Initial D.

== Personal life ==
In February 2016, Ian Jones-Quartey confirmed via Twitter that he and Sugar were in a romantic relationship; at the time of the tweet, the two had been together for eight years. He added that they met when Sugar was at the School of Visual Arts in New York. They were married on December 4, 2019.

In July 2016, Sugar said at a San Diego Comic-Con panel that the LGBT themes in Steven Universe are in large part based on her own experience as a bisexual woman. In a July 2018 interview on NPR, Sugar said that she created the series' Gems as non-binary women to express herself, as a non-binary woman, through them. In August 2020, she said she "didn't identify as a woman" but had felt pressure to conceal that fact due to being known as the first woman to create a Cartoon Network series. In October 2020, in the final art book for Steven Universe, Sugar said that she loved being able to place her experiences in a different context "through a nonbinary lens" when writing characters for the show. As of 2022, Sugar goes by both she/her and they/them pronouns.

In March 2020, Sugar expressed support for Senator Bernie Sanders's second presidential bid. In April 2020, Sugar narrated a video titled Let My People Go, a video created by the organization Never Again Action. The video talks about U.S. Immigration and Customs Enforcement detainees and the poor living conditions they were experiencing in light of the COVID-19 pandemic.

== Accolades ==
=== Adventure Time ===
Sugar's work on Adventure Time gained Primetime Emmy Award for Short-format Animation nominations for the episode "It Came from the Nightosphere" in 2011 and for the episode "Simon & Marcy" in 2013. The show also earned multiple Annie Award nominations. These included, Best Storyboarding in a Television Production in 2012 and Story-boarding in an Animated Television Production in 2013.

=== Steven Universe ===
For Steven Universe, Sugar has been nominated for several media industry awards, including six Primetime Emmy Awards. She and the series have received, among others, the 2018 Peabody Award for Children's & Youth Programming and the 2019 GLAAD Media Award for Outstanding Kids & Family Program; in 2015 the series was named to the James Tiptree Jr. Award Honor List.

=== Honors ===
In 2012, Forbes magazine included her on its "30 Under 30 in Entertainment" list, noting that she was responsible for writing "many of the best episodes" of Adventure Time.

Variety included Sugar in "Hollywood's New Leaders 2016: The Creatives", a list celebrating upcoming filmmakers, show-runners and creators in both traditional and digital media.

In 2025, a South American flower of the genus Commelina was named Commelina sugariae in honour of Sugar's artistic achievements. The same authors named another species C. almandina, a name referring to the garnet colour of the "gem-like" fruits, in honour of the character Garnet from Steven Universe, "because it brings much-needed attention to BIPOC and LGBTQIA+ researchers in STEM."

== Filmography ==
=== Film ===
Year	Title	Role	Notes
2009	Singles	Director, writer, composer, animator	Short film
2012	Hotel Transylvania	Storyboard artist	
TBA	Untitled Moomins film	Director and writer	
TBA	Afterworld: กลับบ้าน	Writer	

=== Television ===
Year	Title	Role	Notes
2010–2013	Adventure Time	Story writer, storyboard artist, songwriter, storyboard revisionist	34 episodes
2015	Adventure Time	Voice role: Marceline's mother	Episode: "Stakes Part 2: Everything Stays"
2013–2019	Steven Universe	Creator, executive producer, storyline writer, storyboard artist, songwriter, showrunner	Television series
2017–2019	OK K.O.! Let's Be Heroes	Writer and performer of end titles	Television series
2019	Steven Universe: The Movie	Creator, director, executive producer, writer, storyboard artist, composer, songwriter	Television film
2019–2020	Steven Universe Future	Creator, executive producer, showrunner	Limited television series
2021	Amphibia	Songwriter ("Our Special Time of Year", uncredited)	Episode: "Froggy Little Christmas"
2021	Amphibia	Voice role: street performer "Becka Salt" (uncredited)	Episode: "Froggy Little Christmas"
2023–present	Adventure Time: Fionna and Cake	Songwriter, writer, storyboard artist	Episodes: "Simon Petrikov", "Cake the Cat", "The Butterfly and the River" & "The Worm and his Orchard"
2025	Adult Swim's The Elephant	Creator, director, screenwriter, animator	Animated special
TBA	Steven Universe: Lars of the Stars	Co-creator, executive producer	Television series

=== Podcasts ===
Year	Title	Role	Notes
2026	Sonic the Hedgehog Presents: The Chaotix Casefiles	Songwriter ("Chaotix Are On The Case")	

== Discography ==
Solo work
Year	Title	Details	Role
2023	Spiral Bound	EP; Format: Digital, vinyl	Composer / Lyricist / Vocalist / Publisher
2025	Lonely Magic	Album; Format: Digital	Composer / Lyricist / Vocalist / Ukelelist
2025	"Hill to Die On"	Single; Format: Digital	Composer/Lyricist/Vocalist

Featuring songs Sugar wrote
Year	Title	Details	Role
2017	Steven Universe/Soundtrack: Volume 1	Compilation album; Label: Turner Music Publishing; Format: Digital, vinyl	Composer/lyricist/vocalist
2018	Adventure Time: Come Along with Me (Original Soundtrack)	Soundtrack album; Label: Turner Music Publishing; Format: digital, vinyl	Composer/lyricist/vocalist
2018	"We Deserve to Shine"	Single; Label: Turner Music Publishing; Format: digital	Lyricist
2019	Steven Universe//Soundtrack: Volume 2	Compilation album; Label: Turner Music Publishing; Format: digital, vinyl	Composer/lyricist/vocalist
2019	Steven Universe//Karaoke	Karaoke compilation album; Label: Turner Music Publishing; Format: digital	Composer
2019	Adventure Time, Vol. 1 (Original Soundtrack)	Compilation album; Label: Cartoon Network Music; Format: digital, vinyl	Composer/lyricist
2019	Adventure Time, Vol. 2 (Original Soundtrack)	Compilation album; Label: Cartoon Network Music; Format: digital, vinyl	Composer/lyricist
2019	Adventure Time, Vol. 3 (Original Soundtrack)	Compilation album; Label: Cartoon Network Music; Format: digital, vinyl	Composer/lyricist/vocalist
2019	Steven Universe: The Movie (Original Soundtrack)	Soundtrack album; Label: Turner Music Publishing; Format: digital, vinyl	Composer/lyricist
2019	Marceline Canta: Timeless Songs	Compilation album; Label: Cartoon Network Music; Format: digital	Composer
2020	Steven Universe Future (Original Soundtrack)	Soundtrack album; Label: Turner Music Publishing; Format: digital	Composer/lyricist
2020	BMO's Mixtape (Gilligan Moss Mix)	Compilation album; Label: Turner Music Publishing; Format: digital	Composer/lyricist
2020	Steven Universe Future (VGR Remix)	Single; Label: Turner Music Publishing; Format: digital	Composer/lyricist
2021	Cartoon Network Theme Songs (Holiday Remix)	Compilation album; Label: Turner Music Publishing; Format: digital	Composer/lyricist
2023	Season 1 – Adventure Time: Fionna and Cake (Soundtrack from the Animated Series)	Soundtrack album; Label: Turner Music Publishing, Water Tower Music; Format: digital	Composer/lyricist/vocalist

Featuring Sugar
Year	Title	Details	Role
2018	"TooGoodToBeTrue"	Single; Label: Mind of a Genius Records/Warner Records Inc.; Format: digital	Featured artist/ukelele
2018	This Song Does Not Fit	EP; Label: Mind of a Genius Records/Warner Records Inc.; Format: digital	Featured artist/ukelele
2025	"Giraffe Song" (Game Edit)	Single; Label: Annapurna Interactive; Format: digital	Featured artist/vocalist
2025	To a T (Original Videogame Soundtrack)	Soundtrack album; Label: Annapurna Interactive; Format: digital	Featured artist/vocalist
2025	Girl, C'mon!	Album; Label: The Blushing Tulips/Island Records/UMG Recordings; Format: Digital	Featured artist
