= Beya Gille Gacha =

French sculptor

- Born: 1990 (age 35–36); Paris, France
- Education: École du Louvre
- Known for: Sculpture, Beading
- Notable work: Beaded figurative sculptures
- Movement: Contemporary art

Beya Gille Gacha (born 1990) is a sculptor. Her work is in the collections of the World Bank and the Smithsonian National Museum of African Art.

== Biography ==
Gacha was born in Paris to a Cameroonian mother and French father. She studied at the École du Louvre before leaving in 2013 to found NÉFE, an artist collective.

She combines plastic arts, including draftsmanship, with writing. Today, beading the surfaces of figurative sculptures serves as the artist's trademark. For her, drawing upon the longstanding practice of the Cameroon grasslands of encasing carved figures and domestic objects with glass beads traded, sometimes traced from as far as the Czech Republic, speaks to both her Bamileke heritage and the longstanding trade of beads that unites Africa with Europe and Asia. For the artist, beading figures and body parts illuminates underrepresented global connections while offering a humanistic focus that draws the eye to and focuses attention on individual human value and personal experience.

Her work has been featured in exhibitions in Dakar, Marrakech, Paris, Rome, and Stockholm, and can be found in the collection of the World Bank and the Smithsonian National Museum of African Art.
