= Gotcha (programming) =

Code that is valid but counter-intuitive

In programming, a gotcha is a valid construct in a system, program or programming language that works as documented but is counter-intuitive and almost invites mistakes because it is both easy to invoke and unexpected or unreasonable in its outcome.

== Example ==
The classic gotcha in C/C++ is the construct

if (a = b) code;

It is syntactically valid: it puts the value of b into a and then executes code if a is non-zero. Sometimes this is even intended. However most commonly it is a typo: the programmer probably meant

if (a == b) code;

which executes code if a and b are equal. Modern compilers will usually generate a warning when encountering the former construct (conditional branch on assignment, not comparison), depending on compiler options (e.g., the -Wall option for gcc). To avoid this gotcha, some programming languages such include specific syntax for when this is desired behavior, such as Python's "walrus" operator (:=). In languages where this specific syntax does not exist, there is a recommendation to keep the constants in the left side of the comparison, e.g. 42 == x rather than x == 42. This way, using = instead of == will cause a compiler error (see Yoda conditions). Many kinds of gotchas are not detected by compilers, however.

== See also ==
- Usability
