= I've Got You =

I've Got You may refer to:

- I've Got You (album), a 1976 album by Gloria Gaynor
- I've Got You (Marc Anthony song), 2002
- I've Got You (Martine McCutcheon song), 1999
