= Gotcha! (1995 video game) =

- Developer: The Dome Software Developments
- Publisher: Atari Corporation
- Platforms: Atari Jaguar, IBM PC compatibles
- Release: Unreleased
- Genre: Party
- Modes: Single-player, multiplayer

Gotcha! is an unreleased party video game that was in development by The Dome Software Developments. It was originally planned to be published by Atari Corporation for the Jaguar, with a scheduled release for 1996. It was also intended to be released for IBM PC compatibles.

Up to four players fight against each other with close-quarter or weapon attacks in an attempt of turning on all of their respective colored light bulbs to be the victor, while also avoiding the dangers and havoc. The project was announced in mid-1995, as part of an effort by Atari Corp.'s UK division to incite independent developers to work with the Jaguar on original games.

== Gameplay ==
Gameplay screenshot

Gotcha! is primarily a side-scrolling action-platform party game with fighting and run and gun elements similar to The Outfoxies and Soldat. The game's basic objective was for players to turn on all of their respective colored light bulbs before AI-controlled opponents manage to do the same by performing close-quarter attacks or by picking up weapons and items scattered across the stage to harm them. Multiplayer is a heavy focus of the game, because up to four players with the Team Tap adapter can compete against each other on a split screen to turn all their light bulbs. Players choose from several large stages, with multiple platforms and obstacles players can run and jump on. Environments employ thematic events and scenarios which can damage players and dynamically change the playing field.

== Development ==
Gotcha! was being developed by The Dome Software Developments, which previously worked on conversions such as Shaq Fu for Amiga and Cannon Fodder for Jaguar. The project formed part of Atari's European center of development, which was established in January 1995 with the aim of working alongside small game developers around the region to create original games for the Jaguar. The game was first announced in the July 1995 issue of Atari Explorer Online for a general 1996 release.

In October 1995, it was previewed by Ultimate Future Games with the only known screenshot of the multiplayer component, while it and internal documents from Atari stated a late 1995 release instead. By this period, Dome Software was also branching out to develop on other platforms such as the PlayStation and Saturn. However, in January 1996, Atari Explorer Online reported that the project was moved to PC instead, as it was deemed unsuitable for the Jaguar. It was eventually canceled for unknown reasons. On November 16, 2016, Creative Assembly director Jonathan Court claimed on a Jaguar-dedicated Facebook group that he worked on the project, and that work done on the project may still be under his ownership.
