= Glitch (video game) =

2011 video game

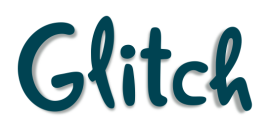
- Developer: Tiny Speck
- Designers: Stewart Butterfield; Keita Takahashi
- Engine: Adobe Flash
- Platform: Browser
- Release: September 27, 2011
- Genre: MMO
- Mode: Multiplayer

Glitch was a browser-based massively multiplayer online game created by Tiny Speck. The game was developed under the leadership of Stewart Butterfield. Glitch was officially launched on September 27, 2011, but reverted to beta status on November 30, 2011, citing accessibility and depth issues. Glitch was officially shut down on December 9, 2012.

While the game itself was short-lived and considered a commercial failure, the internal messaging tool created for its development is notable for being the basis of Slack, which would go on to become a major corporate communication platform. Tiny Speck was later renamed Slack Technologies, reflecting its new focus.

== Gameplay ==
Glitch was a casual, 2D browser-based game featuring a strong multiplayer component. It deliberately steered away from combat mechanics, instead focusing on collaborative crafting and gathering activities. Players were prompted to complete quests and perform various activities that would change the persistent world. Players were invited to expand upon the world, shaping its growth through various activities such as growing plants and trees and cooking food items. The game was free to play, but players could spend money to acquire a number of things such as customization options for their avatar.

Upon logging in for the first time, a user was brought to a one-time street (area), in which a staff member, or specially appointed user (called a "greeter"), would briefly explain the game and show them some features. Once left, the greeting street could never be re-entered. After the "unlaunch" they had a new, more complex and full introduction, in which it was done by NPCs.

The game also had "groups". Groups were tabs in-game (along with individual user IM tabs) that functioned quite like modern chat rooms. The players could create their own groups, join another person's group, or go on either one of the two default groups, one of which was "Live Help", in which users could help one another with general gameplay, the chiefer authority (excluding staff members) here was a "Helper", separate from a staff member, as helpers were mature and professional players appointed by staff members, whereas staff members had contracts and worked for Tiny Speck, the other default chat was "Global Chat", this was for general discussion of any appropriate/popular topic.

Eventually, Tiny Speck introduced "Guides", which were players specially appointed by the staff to help others learn the game in a special, introductory area.

If a player was being disruptive, disrespectful, rude, flooding, or cursing constantly, the player character could be taken to a black room with a single, low light lamp. The user would be accompanied by one or many staff members trying to calm them down and if that did not work, the avatar could be locked down to a chair and the player booted off for an amount of time, called a "Time-Out".

== History ==
=== Development ===
Glitch's lead designer and Tiny Speck co-founder Stewart Butterfield began conceiving the game that would later become Glitch as early as 2002. But because of difficult financial circumstances at the time, he and his colleagues at Ludicorp instead focused on a side-project which later became Flickr. In 2009, Butterfield founded Tiny Speck with the aim of creating a social game.

Glitch has been confirmed to be created on February 21, 2009 (first day of official gameplay). However, the earliest date on the Glitch calendar is either April 1, 2009 or May 22, 2009, which therefore presumes that the game was created before the calendar was implemented. The game was also played on the company's website (tinyspeck.com) before being transferred to glitch.com. Glitch was announced in July 2009. All traces of gameplay history have gone as far back as July 2, 2009. In February 2011, the game went from closed alpha to beta.

=== Release ===
Glitch was officially launched on September 27, 2011. But two months later, on November 30, 2011, Glitch "unlaunched", reverting to beta status. The developers cited issues of accessibility for new players, and depth of gameplay for experienced players.

Glitch had test sessions that ran for usually about a week to a month, in which bugs were recorded, and then for a week or two, revisions were made improving the game, based on player bug reports, staff found bugs/errors, and/or source code updates. At the end of each one, Glitch would throw a massive party, called an End of the World Party, a.k.a. EOTW, EOW, in which a large majority of the players would gather in a suggested area and party, several items were dropped and people even decorated with the items. At the last 60 seconds, the staff members, on an account called "GOD", would speak so everyone in the whole world (also known as "Ur"), even those not at the party, would see him speak, his text would also be shown in the game windows itself, and a song would play called Good Night Groddle, made by Lelu, and improved by Daniel Simmons, Glitch's musical editor, replacing trumpets that sounded the original ending. The last message of the game was GOD saying "*poof*".

=== Closure and fan relaunches ===
Glitch was permanently closed in December 2012, due to limited audience appeal. The company received praise for providing players with continued access to certain game resources and for caring for its laid-off staffers. One year after the game's closure, some of its source code and Flash sources were released to the public under the Creative Commons Zero license.

An attempt was made to revive Glitch as a fan-made fork named "Children of Ur" which aimed to keep the charm of the original game while adding a few twists. The project is hosted under MIT license on GitHub where Glitch's original ActionScript was ported to Dart. As of 2020 the game remains pre-alpha, but most of the textures and basic fundamentals were implemented.

On December 9, 2014, another fan project to relaunch Glitch under the name Eleven began alpha testing. An alpha tester described Eleven as "identical to Glitch". A 2014 video released by the developers of Eleven demonstrates many of the gameplay features functioning as they originally did in Glitch. The "Eleven Giants" source code repository is hosted on GitHub under the MIT license.

In January 2019, another Glitch remake was launched under the name of "Odd Giants". It is developed by a small team and by 2022 it has more than 1200 registered users, having regular players online. The team has attracted multiple supporters via Patreon, launched a Discord server, and constantly releases new versions of the game, coming closer to the original, plus adding features on their own.

In 2021, Slack added a group voice chat feature named Huddles. When all but one participants leave a Huddle, Slack plays a jazz track that was originally used in Glitch for the last participant as hold music.

== Reception ==
Glitch was well received by The A.V. Club, who gave the game a B+ and commended its open-ended approach and variety of tasks. Ars Technica found the game fun, filled with funny little touches.

Joystiq's Beau Hindman named Glitch "Most Charming" in his 2011 Frindie Awards (selected from free-to-play, indie, browser-based games).
