= Gotcha (company) =

American bicycle sharing company

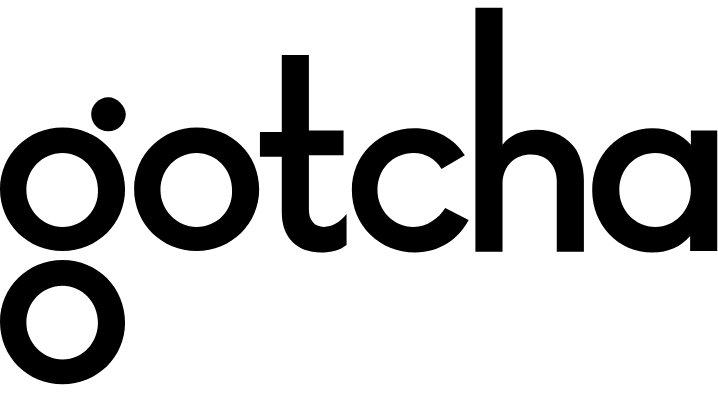
- Company type: Private
- Industry: Bicycle-sharing
- Founder: Sean Flood
- Headquarters: Charleston, South Carolina
- Website: ridegotcha.com

The Gotcha Group LLC, doing business as Gotcha, was an electric bike and scooter-sharing company based in Charleston, South Carolina. Gotcha began operating bike share systems on college campuses in the United States and later expanded to scooter-sharing and other electric vehicles such as electric trike scooters. Gotcha was purchased by Last Mile Holdings in 2020 which was in turn purchased by Bolt Mobility, an American electric scooter company co-founded by Usain Bolt which stopped operating in 2022.

== History ==
Gotcha first offered dockless bike sharing systems on college campuses and certain housing developments, and later offered taxi-like rides in electric vehicles for select markets. As scooters became popular, Gotcha expanded to scooters in some markets. Citing caution about the long-term durability of light-weight two-wheeled scooters, Gotcha began expanding service to electric trike scooters which it believed were more durable, and would allow two riders at a time.

Gotcha was based in Charleston, South Carolina, and also had offices in Los Angeles, Atlanta, and San Francisco.

== Equipment and usage ==
Gotcha offered bikes, scooters, and rides in electric vehicles to various areas, and had announced electric trike service in certain areas. Because the company operated its bike and scooter share systems in conjunction with other organizations, the rates of service varied, but typically included a per-mile rate and sometimes an initial usage fee. In markets where rides in Gotcha's taxi-like electric vehicle service were available during certain hours of operation, rides were available at a flat-rate.

== Locations ==
=== Colleges and Universities ===
- Auburn University
- Augusta University
- Binghamton University
- Florida State University
- Mercy College
- Michigan State University
- Savannah College of Art and Design Savannah campus
- Savannah College of Art and Design Atlanta campus
- Southern Arkansas University
- Southern University
- Lewis University
- Louisiana State University
- Marshall University
- Northern Kentucky University
- Queens University of Charlotte
- University of Buffalo
- University of Georgia
- University of Florida
- University of Louisville
- University of Mississippi
- University of North Carolina at Chapel Hill
- University of North Carolina at Charlotte
- University of Oklahoma
- University of Vermont
- Washington State University

=== Cities and Localities ===
- Baton Rouge, Louisiana
- Burlington, Vermont
- Charleston, South Carolina
- Dallas, Texas
- East Lansing, Michigan
- Fort Lauderdale, Florida
- Galveston, Texas
- Mobile, Alabama
- Nashville, Tennessee
- New River Valley (Blacksburg and Christianburg), Virginia
- Richmond, California
- Rock Hill, South Carolina
- San Gabriel Valley, California
- Sarasota, Florida
- Springfield, Illinois
- St. Augustine, Florida
- Tinker Air Force Base, Oklahoma
- Toledo, Ohio

Before its operations were suspended, Gotcha had announced service for the following localities and educational institutions: Little Rock, Arkansas; Morehead State University in Morehead, Kentucky; Syracuse, New York; and Villanova University.
