= Keita Takahashi =

Japanese game designer and artist (born 1975)

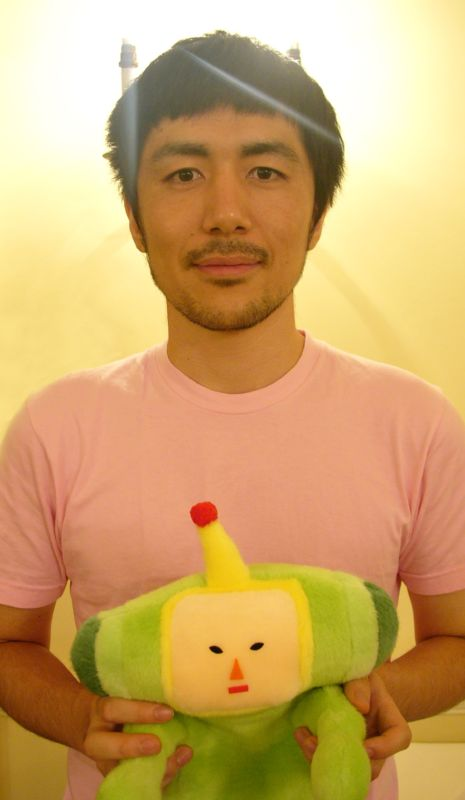
- Takahashi in 2005
- Born: 1975 (age 50–51); Moji-ku, Kitakyūshū, Fukuoka Prefecture, Japan
- Education: Musashino Art University
- Occupations: Game designer, artist
- Spouse: Asuka Sakai
- Children: 2

Keita Takahashi (高橋 慶太, Takahashi Keita; born 1975) is a Japanese game developer and artist. He is best known for creating the Katamari game franchise and working as director and lead designer on Katamari Damacy as well as its sequel, We Love Katamari. The original game was a surprise hit and soon garnered a cult following. After leaving Namco, Takahashi co-founded the indie game studio Uvula in 2010 with his wife Asuka Sakai.

== Career ==
Takahashi entered the Musashino Art University to study sculpting in 1995. After graduating he had lost interest in sculpting as a full-time career and pivoted to video games instead. He joined Namco as an artist around 1999 and started working on multiple smaller projects.

While working at Namco, Takahashi was thinking of original game ideas, but unable to pitch them due to him being in the art department. He eventually joined the Namco Digital Hollywood Game Laboratory, a game design academy run by Namco. He recruited nearly a dozen of its students alongside a few programmers and visual designers from elsewhere inside the company. The prototype of Katamari took six months to develop and led to Namco green lighting the game's full development. After one and a half years of development Katamari Damacy released on March 18, 2004, for the PlayStation 2. The game was a surprise hit and quickly developed a cult following over the years. Katamari Damacy Reroll, a high-definition remastered version of the game, was released in December 2018. In a 2023 interview Takahashi said he isn't receiving any royalties from the sales of Katamari games.

The popularity of Katamari came as a surprise to Takahashi as well as his employer. He strongly opposed the idea of a sequel. After he found out that development on a continuation of Katamari was already underway, Namco informed him they would develop a sequel with or without him. Takahashi decided to take part in the development process once again because he "didn't want players to be disappointed". We Love Katamari released on June 7, 2005. The game is self-referential about being a game as well as a sequel.

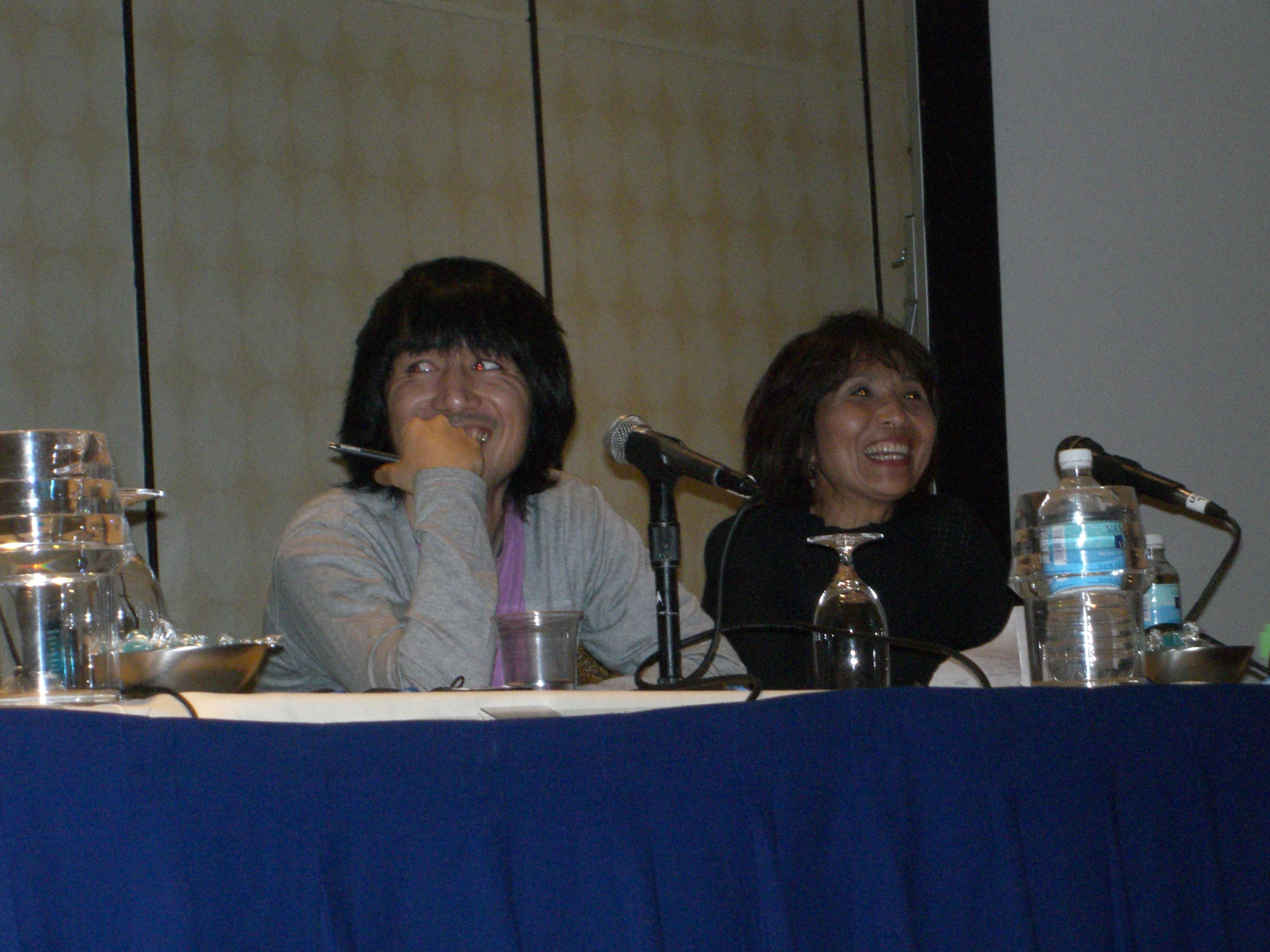
Takahashi at the 2006 Game Developers Conference

On February 19, 2009 Noby Noby Boy was released. The game was published by Bandai Namco and designed by Takahashi. In Noby Noby Boy players were able to collect points and help a separate character travel through the Solar System. The game's goal was shared by all players and was cumulatively reached after more than six years.

In a 2005 interview, just after the release of We Love Katamari, Takahashi announced that he hopes to eventually move on from video games, with an ambition of designing playgrounds for children. He believes children should spend less time in the virtual world and more time in the physical world. In October 2009, the Nottingham City Council announced during the Gamecity festival that Takahashi was spending a month in the city working on designs for the play area at Woodthorpe Grange.

Takahashi quit Namco in 2010, citing creative differences and the changes since the company merged with Japanese toy manufacturer Bandai as reasons for his departure. In a later interview, Takahashi said he wanted to develop games with people from all around the world as to provide a different perspective into game design, and his choice to leave Namco was that he felt he was limited to only the Japanese perspective there. He and his wife, Asuka Sakai, formed the company Uvula around the same time in October 2010. Shortly after that Takahashi and Sakai moved to Vancouver, Canada. In 2012, Takahashi announced that Nottingham project had been indefinitely postponed due to budget concerns.

Takahashi moved to Canada after getting a job offer from Tiny Speck to work on Glitch, a 2D MMO browser game. The project launched in September 2011 and shut down a year later in December 2012. The messaging tools inside Glitch were eventually used as the basis for the corporate communication platform Slack.

In December 2012, Takahashi moved to San Francisco in the United States and started work on his next game Wattam. The game was developed by Funomena, an "experimental game design company" co-founded by Robin Hunicke who has also previously worked on Glitch. Following Wattam Funomena and Takahashi collaborated on multiple more games, including the Project Tango mobile app Woorld. In early 2019, the Telfair Museum ran an exhibition at the Jepson Center for the Arts entitled "Keita Takahashi: Zooming Out", featuring various elements of Takahashi's work. Takahashi worked on designing the exhibits, which included a playable version of his 2013 game Alphabet with a custom controller.

After working on it since at least 2015, a new game by Takahashi and fellow Uvula developer Ryan Mohler was released for and alongside the Playdate, a game console developed by Panic and designed in collaboration with Teenage Engineering, in April 2022. According to Game Developer Crankin's Time Travel Adventure became "something of a poster child" of the Playdate. The game uses the handheld console's mechanical crank to manipulate time.

In July 2022, Uvula and publisher Annapurna Interactive announced a new game project by Takahashi, called "to a T". The game is described as a "narrative adventure game" following the daily life of a teenager in a small coastal town. The game was released on May 28, 2025.

== Selected ludography ==
Year	Game	Role	Publisher	Ref(s)
2004	Katamari Damacy	Director	Namco	
2005	We Love Katamari	Director	Namco	
2009	Noby Noby Boy	Director, designer	Namco Bandai Games	
2011	Glitch	Designer	Tiny Speck	
2013	Tenya Wanya Teens	Designer	Uvula	
2013	Alphabet	Designer	LA Game Space	
2016	Woorld	Designer	Funomena	
2019	Wattam	Designer	Annapurna Interactive	
2022	Crankin's Time Travel Adventure	Designer	Panic Inc.	
2025	To a T	Designer	Annapurna Interactive	
