= Katamari Damacy =

2004 video game

- North American box art
- Developer: Namco (Note: Remaster developed by Monkey Craft)
- Publishers: JP: Namco (Note: Remaster published by Bandai Namco Entertainment); NA: Namco Hometek
- Director: Keita Takahashi
- Producers: Hideki Tomida; Mitsumasa Fujita
- Designer: Masatoshi Ogita
- Programmer: Kazumi Yamabe
- Artists: Keita Takahashi; Takashi Yoshida; Moe Miura
- Composers: Yuu Miyake; Asuka Sakai; Akitaka Tohyama; Hideki Tobeta; Yoshihito Yano; Yuri Misumi
- Series: Katamari
- Platforms: PlayStation 2; Reroll; Windows, Nintendo Switch, PlayStation 4, Xbox One, Google Stadia
- Release: March 18, 2004: PlayStation 2; JP: March 18, 2004; NA: September 21, 2004; Reroll; Windows, Switch; WW: December 7, 2018 PlayStation 4, Xbox One; JP: November 19, 2020; WW: November 20, 2020; Stadia; WW: September 7, 2021
- Genres: Puzzle, action
- Modes: Single-player, multiplayer

Katamari Damacy (Note: 塊魂, Katamari Damashii; lit. 'Clump Spirit') is a 2004 action puzzle video game developed and published by Namco for the PlayStation 2. The game's plot concerns a diminutive prince on a mission to rebuild stars, constellations, and the Moon, which were inadvertently destroyed by his father, the King of All Cosmos. This is achieved by rolling a magical, highly adhesive ball called a katamari around various locations, collecting increasingly larger objects, ranging from thumbtacks to human beings to mountains, until the ball has grown large enough to become a star. Katamari Damacy's story, settings and characters are highly stylized and surreal, often both celebrating and satirizing facets of Japanese culture.

Designer Keita Takahashi struggled to pitch the game to Namco's superiors, eventually seeking student aid from the Namco Digital Hollywood Game Laboratory to develop the project for less than US$1 million. As director, Takahashi emphasized concepts of novelty, ease of understanding, and enjoyment.

Katamari Damacy received critical acclaim, becoming a surprise hit and winning several awards. Its success led to the creation of the greater Katamari franchise, and inspired numerous subsequent games imitating its quirky, colorful charm. Certain critics have hailed it as a cult classic and one of the greatest video games of all time, praising its gameplay, replay value, humor, originality, and Shibuya-kei soundtrack. A high-definition remaster of the game, Katamari Damacy Reroll, (Note: 塊魂アンコール, Katamari Damacy Encore) was released by Namco's successor Bandai Namco Entertainment for Windows and Nintendo Switch in December 2018, PlayStation 4 and Xbox One in November 2020, and Google Stadia in September 2021.

== Gameplay ==
The "Make A Star" mode in Katamari Damacy is the primary mode, where the player must grow the katamari to a specific size (diameter) in a limited amount of time.

The player controls the Prince as he rolls the katamari around houses, gardens, and towns in order to meet certain parameters set by the King of All Cosmos. The player uses the two analog sticks on the DualShock controller in a manner similar to the classic arcade game Battlezone to control the direction the katamari rolls. Other controls can be triggered by the player to gain a quick burst of speed, flip the Prince to the other side of the katamari and more.

Objects that are smaller than the katamari will stick to it when the player comes into contact with them, while greater objects can be hurdles; colliding at high speed with any may cause objects to fall off the katamari, slowing the player's progress. The game uses size, weight, and surface area to determine if an object will stick to the katamari. This allows slender objects, such as pencils, that are longer than the katamari is wide, to be picked up, and these will alter how the katamari rolls until more objects are picked up. Animals such as cats will chase the katamari, knocking things from it, but once the katamari is great enough, it will scare the animals away, and they can be rolled up once they are chased down. As objects stick to the katamari, the katamari will grow, eventually allowing objects that were once hurdles to be picked up, and creating access to areas that were formerly blocked. In this manner, the player might start the game by picking up thumbtacks and ants, and slowly work up to the point where the katamari is picking up buildings, mountains, and clouds.

Logo text for Katamari Damacy

The typical mission given by the King of All Cosmos is the "Make a Star" mode, where the player needs to grow the katamari to a specific size within a given time frame. Other missions have more specific collecting rules, such as collecting as many items (swans, crabs, pairs) as possible within a given time, or collecting the largest item possible (such as a cow or bear). The player can attempt a score attack mode for any level, where the goal is to make the largest katamari possible in the time allotted. Certain levels can unlock an "eternal mode" by creating an exceptionally large katamari. In eternal modes, the player can explore the level with no time limit.

Each level features two secret items that can be found. The first item is a royal present that contains an object that the Prince can wear. Most gifts are non-functional, but one includes a camera that can be used to take in-game screenshots. In the two-player mode, a player can choose to play as either the Prince or one of his numerous Cousins. The screen is split vertically; player one on the left and player two on the right. Players compete simultaneously in a small arena to collect the most objects within three minutes. The playing field is replenished with new objects periodically. Players can ram into each other, knocking items from their opponents' katamaris, and if one player leads by a fair amount, then it is possible to roll up the opponent's katamari.

== Plot ==
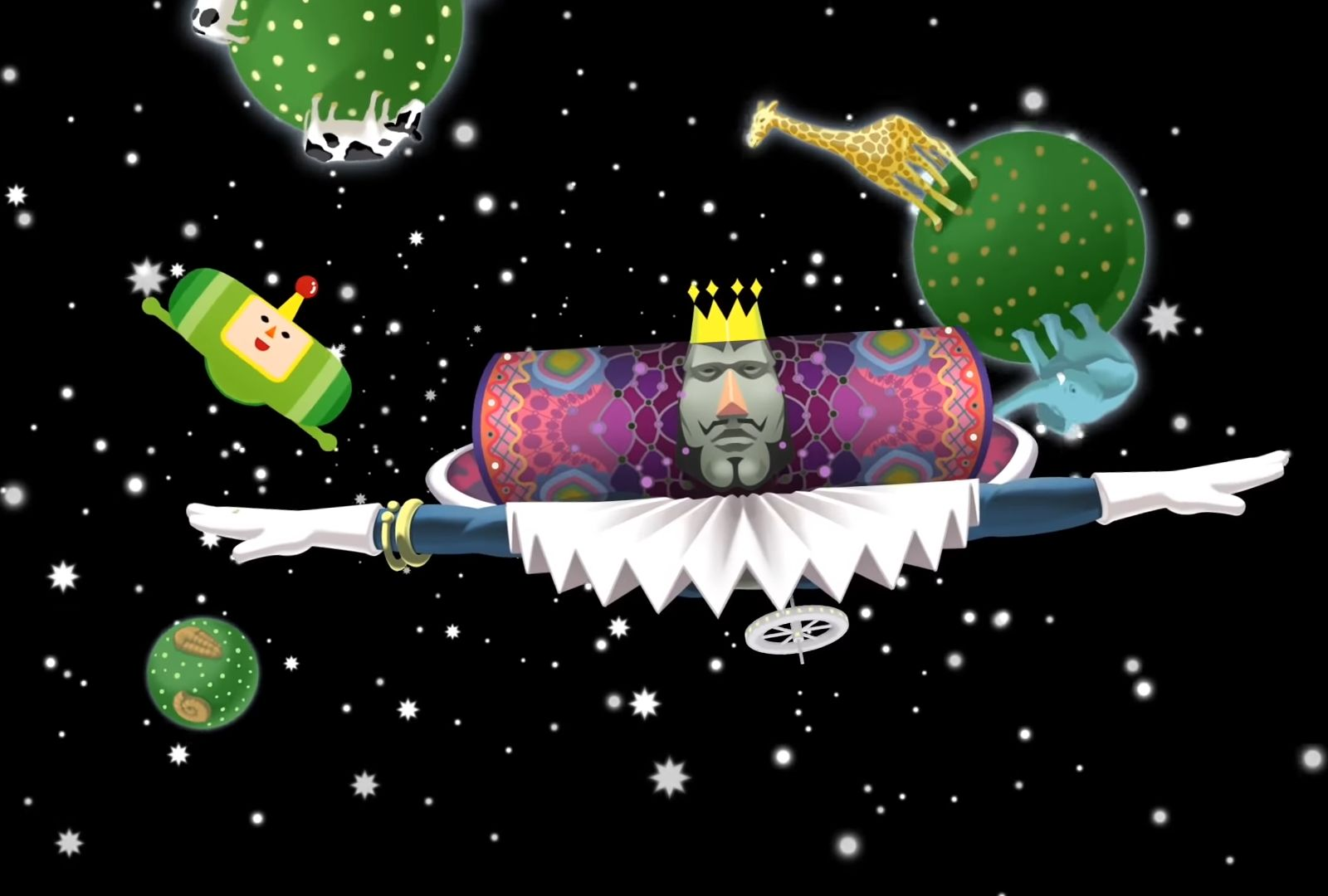
The Prince (left) and King of All Cosmos (right)

In a drunken stupor, an eccentric, god-like entity called the King of All Cosmos destroys all the stars, Earth's Moon and other such celestial bodies in the universe, except for Earth itself. Despite acknowledging his mistake, the King charges his five-centimeter-tall son, the Prince, to go to Earth with a "Katamari"—a magical ball that allows anything smaller than it to stick to it and make it grow—and collect enough material for him to recreate the stars and the Moon. The Prince is successful, and the universe is returned to normal.

A side-story follows the Hoshino family as the Prince works at his tasks. The father, an astronaut, is unable to go to the Moon after it is wiped out by the King, and the daughter, whose name is Michiru, "senses" the Prince's work—she can feel when each constellation returns to the sky. Ultimately, the family, along with their house and town, are rolled up in the katamari that is used to remake the Moon.

== Development ==
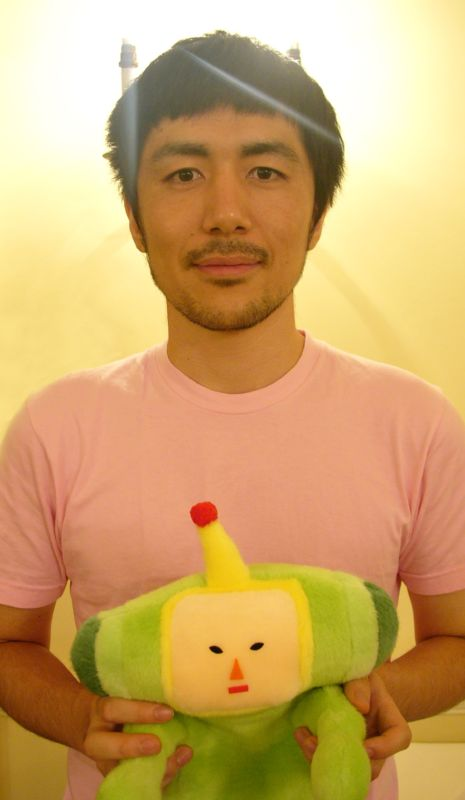
Takahashi in 2005, with a plush version of the Prince

Keita Takahashi entered Musashino Art University to study sculpting in 1995. During his studies, he came to a philosophy that his art needed to combine practical elements along with a bit of whimsy and humor. After graduation, Takahashi no longer had the desire to pursue sculpting as a full-time career, and saw the potential to become involved in video games as a means to continue his art interest in a larger medium. Joining Namco as an artist around 1999, Takahashi worked on a number of smaller projects for the publisher. One of these was called Action Drive, inspired by Crazy Taxi but with more spy-based elements atop the driving gameplay. During this, Takahashi came up with the ideas of the characters that would be central to Katamari Damacy: the King, the Queen, and the Prince of all Cosmos. His idea would have been that the queen had been kidnapped by agents on Earth, and the lazy King sends the Prince to rescue her. To do this, the player would use the diminutive Prince's head, shaped like a hammer, to stun humans, after which the Prince would then "drive" the humans around by putting a steering wheel on the back of the human's head. Takahashi felt this would lead to interesting and creative gameplay, allowing the player to create havoc as the Prince followed the misguided suggestions from the King, but the project leader rejected the idea. Action Drive was eventually cancelled.

While working on other projects, Takahashi continued to try to think of game ideas, seeking to grow beyond being just an artist for Namco. Takahashi cited two concepts that led to the inspiration of Katamari Damacy. The first was a prototype shown by Sony Computer Entertainment called Densen (Japanese for "power line") that had the player as a young girl traverse floating islands of various homes connected by power lines. The game, though never released, gave Takahashi the idea that the ordinary world could be made interesting with only small changes to perception, and that a game could be fun without the need to cause violence. The second idea was from the game of tamakorogashi played in Japanese school's undōkai or sports days. In tamakorogashi, students attempt to push a giant ball into a goal. Both those ideas led to him thinking of a game where spinning a ball would roll ordinary objects into it, making the ball larger and larger over time. The evening he conceived of this idea, he spoke to a friend, one of the game designers in Namco, to see if it made for a good game idea, who agreed it had potential. The next day, he spoke to his former boss, Mitsutoshi Ozaki, about the concept, further adding a way to reuse the King and Prince characters he had previously proposed, who also agreed it would make for a great game.

As Takahashi was in Namco's art department and not in game design, there was no easy route for him to propose this idea to Namco's superiors. Ozaki suggested a novel approach for Takahashi through the Namco Digital Hollywood Game Laboratory. At the time, Namco had been following in the model that Konami had used in 1997: Konami established the Konami Computer Entertainment School to help educate new game developers which were eventually hired in Konami, and several of the experimental ideas founded by the School during this time became products within the Konami Games & Music Division (later, Bemani) that were highly successful, including Beatmania, GuitarFreaks, and Dance Dance Revolution. Namco hoped the Digital Hollywood Game Laboratory would follow a similar path. At the time, Masaya Nakamura was principal of this school, and oversaw one senior thesis class where the students were being trained on 3D modeling towards producing a game prototype with the help of other Namco employees, which could potentially be made into a full game. Ozaki suggested to Takahashi that he could have the students of this class create the 3D objects needed to populate his game world.

Takahashi took Ozaki's advice, joining the project to help produce the prototype for his game. Alongside about ten students from the Digital Hollywood program, he had been able to gain some visual design artists from Namco to help with the prototype but had difficulty in getting any game development engineers, due to the low priority of the school. He was fortunate to find that some of the engineers from Namco's arcade game division were going to be laid off, and he was able to convince three of them to join his team to retain their jobs within Namco.

One initial difficulty faced in developing the prototype was their choice of platform, the PlayStation 2. At the time the project started, Sony had just announced the specifications for the console, which was built from the ground-up to support 3D graphics via the Emotion Engine, but the company did not provide any updated software development kits, believing that developers would be able to figure out the hardware. As a result, the console was difficult to develop for at its launch. In contrast, Nintendo had recently announced the GameCube and that it would provide more developer-friendly features in contrast to the previous Nintendo 64 console. Thus, Takahashi's team decided to develop for the GameCube for their prototype even though the final game was expected to be a PlayStation 2 release. In creating the prototype, Takahashi had envisioned that while the ball the player rolled around would grow as they rolled over objects, it would also shrink if they collided with obstacles and lost objects from it. This would have been tied to an interactive music track, which would have started off simple with a small ball and become more complex and full as it got larger. Technically, the team found they could not implement this shrinking mechanic due to memory limitations, and further found that with the interactive music concept, it was not fun to shrink back down and hear the music regress to a simpler form. The shrinking concept as well as the interactive music approach were subsequently dropped. The prototype was completed within about six months, in time for the year's Japan Media Arts Festival for exhibition. Takahashi also presented the game for an internal review, leading Namco to green light the game's full development.

Full work on Katamari Damacy began in late 2001. Namco assigned Now Production, based in Osaka, to help bring the game to the PlayStation 2. Takahashi was initially concerned about having to work with an external studio in a different location, but found that the Namco and Now Production teams worked well together. The full team consisted of about twenty members between the two companies, and Namco had allocated a budget of about ¥100 million (about US$650,000–800,000 at the time of production) for the game; this was about a tenth of the cost of budget allocated for Namco's blockbuster titles such as Ridge Racer or Soulcalibur. The full game took a year and a half to develop, with eight months of prototyping from the Digital Hollywood version.

Takahashi said that the team was aiming for four key points in developing the game: novelty, ease of understanding, enjoyment, and humor. Toru Iwatani compared the game to his own, Pac-Man, which focused on simplicity and innovation and served as a template for future games from the company. At one point during development, Takahashi "proactively ignored" advice from Namco to increase the complexity of the game.

The core gameplay of Katamari Damacy is the subject of U.S. Patent 7,402,104, "Game performing method, game apparatus, storage medium, data signal and program". The patent, issued in 2009, primarily describes how the game maintains the roughly spherical nature of the katamari when objects are picked up, though extends to concepts such as tracking objects collected based on temperature or weight values, which were modes included with later games of the series.

=== Music ===
The soundtrack for Katamari Damacy was released in Japan as Katamari Fortissimo Damacy. Its eclectic composition featured elements of traditional electronic video game music, as well as heavy jazz, Shibuya-Kei and samba influences. Most of the tracks were composed by Yuu Miyake, and many feature vocals from popular J-pop singers, such as Yui Asaka from the Sukeban Deka 3 TV series, and anime voice actors, including Nobue Matsubara and Ado Mizumori. One track is sung and written by Charlie Kosei, composer of the Lupin III soundtrack.

== Release ==
A single-level demonstration of the final version of Katamari Damacy was exhibited at the 2003 Tokyo Game Show (TGS). The demo was critically praised by the press, with GameSpot's Jeff Gerstmann describing it as a "good dose of weird fun". Sony expressed strong interest in pushing the game's release forward based on the TGS response, offering to handle the game's promotion in exchange. Sony advertised the game on numerous billboards and posters across Japan, and created an infamous television ad of a businessman, waiting for an appointment, rolling up office furniture and staff. The original prototype game's cover artwork featured the large red ball used in tamakorogashi, but for the game's final release, Takahashi developed the game's cover art, showing a large katamari on the verge of rolling over a city, emphasizing the scale of the game.

The game was released in Japan on March 18, 2004, priced at about ¥4,000, roughly two-thirds of the cost of most major titles at the time. Namco had estimated that the game would sell over 500,000 units in Japan during its first year, and while the game did not make that metric, it had stayed as one of the top ten games sold in Japan through its first nine weeks on the market, with more than 100,000 units sold during that period, which was considered impressive for a new intellectual property. The public reaction to the game was positive enough that Namco ordered a sequel by December 2004.

At this point, Namco had not considered any Western release for the game. Katamari Damacy was first shown in the United States at the Experimental Gameplay Workshop during the March 2004 Game Developers Conference. A group of Western developers from the International Game Developers Association had previously brought Mojib-Ribbon to the 2003 Experimental Gameplay Workshop after seeing it demonstrated at the 2002 TGS, and had been at the 2003 TGS to look for a similar title to exhibit in 2004. Discovering Katamari Damacy as an ideal title to exhibit, the group arranged with Namco to have Takahashi come to the United States to present the game. The press reaction to the session was described as "electric", but they were disappointed to learn from Takahashi that there were no plans for a Western release. Media attention to the game from the Workshop, often called "Namco's snowball simulator", led to more pressure on Namco for a Western release. Takahashi was again invited to come present the game at E3 2004. Players wanting the game to release in the West also wrote to Namco for a release. That July, Namco officially announced the game's release in North America for September 2004. The game was never officially released in Europe, though its subsequent sequels would receive European releases.

In Japanese, Katamari (塊) means "clump" or "clod" and Damashii is the rendaku form of tamashii (魂) which means "soul" or "spirit". Therefore, the phrase approximates to "clump spirit" or "clump of spirits". The two kanji that form the name look similar (sharing the same right-side element 鬼), in a kind of visual alliteration. The name is officially transliterated as Katamari Damacy in most releases. Game creator Keita Takahashi said that the title suddenly popped into his head from the start and never changed during development.

== Reception ==
Reception

Aggregate score
Aggregator	Score
Metacritic	86/100

Review scores
Publication	Score
1Up.com	A
Edge	8/10
Eurogamer	9/10
Famitsu	31/40
Game Informer	8/10
GamePro	4/5
GameRevolution	A−
GameSpot	8.7/10
GameSpy	4.5/5
GameZone	9.2/10
IGN	9/10
Official U.S. PlayStation Magazine	4.5/5

Katamari Damacy enjoyed moderate success in Japan. The game was sold at about two-thirds of the price of a new game at the time. It was the top-selling game the week of its release with 32,000 units sold, and sold over 155,000 copies in Japan by the end of 2004. Namco, however, originally estimated that over 500,000 units would be sold in Japan.

The game was not released in PAL territories such as Europe and Australia since publishers thought it was too "quirky" for these markets; Electronic Arts picked up both sequels, We Love Katamari and Me & My Katamari, for release in Europe.

In North America the game was acclaimed by critics, and was mentioned and praised on TechTV, and was a featured sidebar in the May 2004 edition of Time magazine. Time continued to praise the game in its November 2004 "Best games of the year" special, calling it "the most unusual and original game" for PlayStation 2. Most retailers underestimated the demand for such a quirky game, and only purchased a few copies of this sleeper hit; it rapidly sold out nationwide, with sales surpassing 120,000 units in North America. It also won the U.S. award for "Excellence in Game Design" at the 2005 Game Developers Choice Awards, and G4 awarded Katamari Damacy its "Best Innovation" prize in its G-Phoria of that year. Katamari Damacy was one of the recipients of the 2004 Good Design Award in Japan, the first time a video game has won this award. During the 8th Annual Interactive Achievement Awards, the Academy of Interactive Arts & Sciences awarded Katamari Damacy with "Outstanding Innovation in Console Gaming" and "Outstanding Achievement in Game Design", as well as receiving nominations for "Game of the Year", "Console Game of the Year", and "Outstanding Achievement in Original Musical Composition". GameSpot named it the best PlayStation 2 game of September 2004. It later won the publication's year-end "Best Puzzle/Rhythm Game", "Best Original Music" and "Most Innovative Game" awards across all platforms.

In 2015, the game placed 13th on USgamer's The 15 Best Games Since 2000 list. In 2019, it was ranked 49th on The Guardian newspaper's "The 50 Best Video Games of the 21st Century" list.

Although the game has rapidly achieved a cult following and has been praised by many reviewers, it also has its share of criticism. A common complaint is that the game is relatively short and repetitive—it can be completed in under ten hours, and the gameplay stays virtually the same all the way through. Others, however, such as Electronic Gaming Monthly reviewer Mark McDonald (who gave the game 8.5 out of ten with his EGM staff), argue that the game's limitations, such as having "basically ... the same" objective in each level, are made up by its strengths, like "elegant" controls, its soundtrack, and "wicked" humor. As a well-executed, non-traditional game, Katamari Damacy has been influential in the game development community. Since its release, a number of other games have been inspired by Katamari, such as The Wonderful End of the World and Donut County.

== Legacy ==
Katamari Damacy has spawned numerous sequels on the PlayStation 2 and newer game consoles. The game's direct sequel on the PlayStation 2, We Love Katamari, was released internationally in 2005 and 2006. Its story is self-referential, following on the success of the first game, most of the levels are based on requests from newfound fans of the King and the Prince. Though sharing the same mechanics, We Love Katamari introduces new gameplay features, such as co-operative play, and new goals, such as collecting the most valuable objects, that would continue through its sequels.

On July 29, 2012, the game was included in an exhibit at the New York Museum of Modern Art, entitled "Century of the Child: Growing by Design". Here, the game was used to demonstrate the change in toys and "playthings" over the 20th century, specifically praising the game for its "quirky manipulations of scale" that makes it accessible for all ages. Vice president of marketing for Namco Bandai Games America, Inc. Carlson Choi described the inclusion of Katamari Damacy to the exhibit as "a testament to the creative designs embodied in Namco Bandai's games, in addition to being a validation of video games as a modern form of interactive art". On November 29 of the same year, the game was included in the permanent collection of video games of the Museum of Modern Art. Curator Paola Antonelli selected Katamari Damacy among the first fourteen games to be displayed in the museum, which was chosen according to a variety of criteria, including "visual quality, elegance of the code and design of playing behavior".

Katamari Damacy Reroll release trailer

A high-definition remaster of the game developed by Monkey Craft and made with Unity, titled Katamari Damacy Reroll, was released on the Nintendo Switch and Windows on December 7, 2018. Known as Katamari Damacy Encore in Japan, it is the first title in Bandai Namco Entertainment's Encore series of remasters. The game includes support for the Switch's gyro controls in addition to its traditional control scheme. Reroll was nominated for the Freedom Tower Award for Best Remake at the 2020 New York Game Awards. PlayStation 4 and Xbox One versions were released in November 2020. A version for Amazon Luna became available on March 4, 2021, and a Stadia version in September of the same year.

In a retrospective in 2019, Edge noted that playing the game 15 years after its initial release reveals how influential the game has been for independent games following it, and added that Takahashi's game is "playful and tremendously funny, deeply weird and a game with real heart".
