= Music of the Katamari Damacy series =

Music from the video game series Katamari Damacy

Katamari (Note: Japanese: 塊魂, Hepburn: Katamari Damashii; "Soul of Clumps") is a video game franchise created by Keita Takahashi and developed and published by Namco (and subsequently Bandai Namco Entertainment). The first game in the series, Katamari Damacy, was published in 2004. The success of the game led to the release of six sequels over the next five years: We Love Katamari, Me & My Katamari, Beautiful Katamari, Katamari Damacy Mobile, I Love Katamari, and Katamari Forever. It also inspired a spin-off game, Korogashi Puzzle Katamari Damacy. Two mobile games in the franchise, Katamari Amore and Touch My Katamari, were released in 2011, and two more, Tap My Katamari and Amazing Katamari Damacy, were released in 2016. Another sequel, Once Upon a Katamari, was released in 2025.

Seven of the games' soundtracks have been released as albums. Katamari Fortissimo Damacy, a soundtrack album for the original game, was released by Columbia Music Entertainment in 2004, Katamari wa Damacy was released as a soundtrack album for We Love Katamari by Columbia Music Entertainment in 2005, and Katamari Original Soundtrack Damacy was released in 2006 as a soundtrack album for Me & My Katamari by the same publisher and also included tracks from We Love that were not included in its album. Katamari Suteki Damacy was released by Columbia Music Entertainment in 2007 as a soundtrack album for Beautiful Katamari, and Katamari Damacy Tribute Original Soundtrack: Katamari Takeshi, was released in 2009 by Columbia Music Entertainment as the soundtrack album for Katamari Forever. Touch My Katamari, Katamari Damacy Rolling Live, Once Upon a Katamari received soundtrack releases; the soundtracks to the other Katamari games have been composed of tracks from previous games in the series, and have not had separate albums.

Both the soundtracks and their associated albums have been well received by reviewers, who have cited the "catchiness" and "quirkiness" of the music as their most notable features. The soundtrack to Katamari Damacy won both IGN's and GameSpot's "Soundtrack of the Year 2004" awards, while the theme song to We Love Katamari was awarded Best Original Vocal/Pop Song at the 4th Annual Game Audio Network Guild Awards in 2006. None of the other soundtracks have been nominated for any awards. They were still well received by reviewers, with the music of the PlayStation Portable game Me & My Katamari receiving the weakest reviews due to its extensive reuse of songs from previous games in the series.

== Katamari Damacy ==
Katamari Fortissimo Damacy

Soundtrack album by Yuu Miyake et al.
- Released: May 19, 2004
- Recorded: 2001–2004
- Studios: Bunkamura Studio studio Fine
- Genres: Shibuya-kei; video game music
- Length: 1:15:14
- Label: Columbia Music Entertainment
- Producers: Hirokuni Maeyama; Yuu Miyake

"Katamari Nah-Nah" sample
Short sample of "Katamari Nah-Nah", featuring the iconic "na-na-na-na" of the series' music — 726 KB

Katamari Damacy is a third-person puzzle-action video game that was published and developed by Namco for the PlayStation 2 in 2004. The music in the game was widely hailed as imaginative and original and was considered one of its top-selling points. Its eclectic composition featured elements of traditional electronic video game music, as well as heavy jazz and samba influences. The tracks were composed by multiple composers, with Yuu Miyake composing the most at seven and acting as the sound director; other composers for the game were Asuka Sakai, Akitaka Tohyama, Yoshihito Yano, Yuri Misumi, and Hideki Tobeta. Many of the tracks feature vocals from popular J-pop singers such as Yui Asaka and anime voice actors such as Nobue Matsubara and Ado Mizumori. Miyake has stated that they chose the artists by looking for "Japanese singers who were well-known in Japan but nobody had heard from in a while for whatever reason". Miyake wanted to use vocal songs because he felt that they were necessary "to make music that only Katamari Damacy could do, really fun music". He has said that game director Keita Takahashi did not give detailed directions on the sound design of the game, allowing Miyake and his team to instead create whatever they felt would fit best.

The artists were chosen after the lyrics were written, and were selected based on how well Miyake and Takahashi felt they would "gel with the world of Katamari Damacy and the content of the song lyrics". They were also chosen to create a "pretty silly, goofy selection of singers" that would appeal to "a broad spectrum of people from different generations". Once the lyrics and singers had been chosen, the music was written specifically for each artist with the intention of creating songs that were "familiar" but not "trendy" so that they would not seem dated in the future. The "humming" in the opening song, described by Miyake as "na-na-na-na-na-na-na-Katamari", was included as an experiment by Miyake to try to create a "memorable" theme associated with the game, in response to criticisms that modern game music was not as memorable as that of older games. Miyake says that "Cherry Tree Times" is his favorite piece from the series.

Katamari Fortissimo Damacy (塊フォルテッシモ魂, Katamari Forutesshimo Damashii; lit. "Clump Fortissimo Spirit") is the soundtrack album to the game. It includes all of the tracks featured in the game, as well as an additional track, "Katamari March Damacy", a bonus song that was not included in the game. The album has 21 tracks that span a duration of 1:15:13. It was released on May 19, 2004, by Columbia Music Entertainment with the catalog number COCX-32760.

The soundtrack to Katamari Damacy won both IGN's and GameSpot's "Soundtrack of the Year 2004" awards. It was also nominated for "Outstanding Achievement in Original Musical Composition" at the 8th annual Interactive Achievement Awards in February 2005. It reached #191 on the Japanese Oricon sales charts.

In GameSpot's review of the game, they described the soundtrack as based around a "singular, extremely catchy theme" that appeared as pop, jazz, and humming throughout the "insidiously infectious" music. IGN's review of the game called its tracks catchy and genuine. The soundtrack album was praised in a review by Square Enix Music Online, who said that in addition to the music being "outside the box", the soundtrack "fits with the graphics and gameplay in every way possible", is "extremely pleasing to the ears", and "could very well be a great album with no game attached". He described the music as "fun", "catchy", and "quirky" and highly recommended the album. Over 20 years later, in a 2026 review of the album by Billie Bugara of Pitchfork, she called it "idiosyncrasy in its truest form" and a "wild and wonderful" take on the Shibuya-kei subgenre of music, mixing inspirations from a wide variety of musical styles into a "katamari" of "retro-futurist creations both cheeky and grand".

Tracklist
No.	Title	Lyrics	Music	Vocals	Length
1.	"Katamari Nah-Nah" (ナナナン塊 Nananan Katamari)	Yuu Miyake	Miyake	Yuusama	1:21
2.	"Katamari on the Rocks ~ Main Theme" (塊オンザロック～メインテーマ)	Miyake, Keita Takahashi	Miyake	Masayuki Tanaka (of Crystal King) & Tomomi Suzuki (chorus)	5:57
3.	"Overture"		Asuka Sakai, Miyake		0:49
4.	"The Moon & The Prince" (月と王子)	Akitaka Tohyama	Tohyama	Kenji Ninuma & Fumina (chorus)	5:30
5.	"Fugue #7777" (フーガ#7777)		Sakai		1:22
6.	"LONELY ROLLING STAR"	Yoshihito Yano	Yano	Saki Kabata	5:44
7.	"Walking on a Star!" (ステキ星のさんぽはステキ, "The Wonderful Star's Walk is Wonderful")		Yuri Misumi		3:12
8.	"katamari mambo [Katamari Syndrome Re-mix]" (塊シンドロームmix)	Kazuyuki Oda, Misumi	Misumi	Nobue Matsubara & Sakamoto-Chan	5:35
9.	"You Are Smart"		Tohyama		3:32
10.	"Gin & Tonic & Red Red Roses" (真っ赤なバラとジントニック, "A Crimson Rose and a Gin Tonic")	Sakai	Sakai	Ado Mizumori & Asami Shimada (chorus)	4:29
11.	"WANDA WANDA"		Miyake		3:23
12.	"Que Sera Sera" (ケ・セラ・セラ)	Sakai, Natsuki Isaki	Sakai	Charlie Kosei	5:31
13.	"Angel Gifts" (天使風味の贈り物, "Angel Flavor's Present")		Miyake		5:08
14.	"Roll Me In" (カタマりたいの Katamaritaino)	Hideki Tobeta	Tobeta	Yui Asaka & Mika Sato (chorus)	5:53
15.	"Katamari☆Stars" (カタマリ☆スターズ)		Tobeta		2:28
16.	"Cherry Tree Times" (さくらいろの季節, "Cherry Blossom Color Season")	Miyake	Miyake	Katamari-Tai Jr., Chihiro Arai, Hiroki Fujita, Kana Sagara, Kento Masui, Tomoka Osawa, Mai Tsukada, and Chikara Kawatsuchina	6:14
17.	"Lovely Angel" (ラブリーエンジェル)		Miyake		1:27
18.	"Stardust Fanfare" (スターダスト・ファンファーレ)		Tohyama		0:08
19.	"The Last Samba" (さいごにサンバ)		Sakai	Katamari Samba-Tai	1:00
20.	"Katamari of Love ~ Ending Theme" (愛のカタマリ～エンディングテーマ)	Yano, Tohyama	Yano, Tohyama	Shigeru Matsuzaki	4:09
21.	"Katamari March Damacy" (塊マーチ魂) (previously unreleased bonus track)		Miyake		2:21
Total length:					1:15:13

== We Love Katamari ==
Katamari wa Damacy

Soundtrack album by Yuu Miyake et al.
- Released: July 20, 2005
- Genre: Video game soundtrack
- Length: 1:19:45
- Label: Columbia Music Entertainment

We Love Katamari (みんな大好き塊魂, Minna Daisuki Katamari Damashii; roughly "Everyone Loves Clump Spirit") is the sequel to Katamari Damacy published by Namco for the PlayStation 2 in 2005. It features music from Namco composers Yuu Miyake, Akitaka Tohyama, Asuka Sakai, Hideki Tobeta, and Katsuro Tajima, all of whom except for Tajima had composed for the previous soundtrack. Like the previous soundtrack, it also features a plethora of Japanese artists, including DOKAKA, Illreme, Arisa, KIRINJI, YOU, Karie Kahimi, Maki Nomiya and Shigeru Matsuzaki. The music has been described as covering styles ranging from swing and techno to J-pop and "other kooky sounds". Sound director Yuu Miyake has stated that he wanted to use only non-Japanese musicians in contrast to the first game using only Japanese artists, but was unable due to a "lack of foreign friends and ability to negotiate". He has stated that his goal for the soundtrack was to take what his team had done for the first game and raise the quality, creating a "more grown-up feeling". He originally wanted to additionally take the music "far beyond imagination" and fans' expectations, but was stymied by a lack of resources.

Katamari wa Damacy (塊は魂, Katamari wa Damashii) is the official soundtrack album for the game. It does not include all the music from the game, omitting many of the instrumental tracks heard throughout the game. These omissions were later added on the second disc of the soundtrack album of Me & My Katamari. The album was published by Columbia Music Entertainment on July 20, 2005, with the catalog number COCX-33273; its 18 tracks span a duration of 1:19:45.

We Love Katamari was nominated for the "best audio" award at the 2005 British Academy of Film and Television Arts awards. While the soundtrack as a whole did not win any awards like its predecessor, "Katamari on the Swing" won the award for Best Original Vocal/Pop Song at the 4th Annual Game Audio Network Guild awards in 2006. The album reached #100 on the Japanese Oricon charts. GameSpot's review of the game termed the music "utterly avant-garde" and a "completely off-the-wall soundtrack that has the same key themes as the first game", though "decidedly less focused on catchiness" than that of the first game and more "experimental". Square Enix Music Online, in their review of the soundtrack album, said that it "pretty much lives up to the original's reputation" and is full of "lots of great original compositions that fit with the concept". While they said that the soundtrack has "more flaws and it's a bit less memorable" than the soundtrack to Katamari Damacy, it was still "just as fun and as quirky as the last".

Track list
No.	Title	Lyrics	Music	Vocals	Length
1.	"Introduction"	Yuu Miyake	Miyake (arrangement by Akitaka Tohyama)		0:24
2.	"Katamari on the Rocks" (塊オンザロック)	Miyake, Keita Takahashi	Miyake (arr. Dokaka)	Dokaka (Beatboxing)	6:37
3.	"Overture II"		Miyake, Asuka Sakai		1:16
4.	"Katamari on the Swing" (塊オンザスウィング)	Miyake, Yoshihito Yano	Miyake, Yano (arr. Miyake)	Shigeru Matsuzaki	4:40
5.	"Kuru Kuru Rock" (くるくるロック)	Illreme	Illreme	Illreme	5:10
6.	"Everlasting Love"	Tohyama	Tohyama	Alisa	4:45
7.	"Bluffing Damacy" (つよがり魂)	Takahashi	Sakai (arr. Sakai, Horigome Takaki, Miyake)	Kirinji (Yasuyuki Horigome)	5:32
8.	"Beautiful Star" (ビューティフルスター)		Miyake		3:08
9.	"Angel Rain" (天使の雨)	Hideki Tobeta	Tobeta	YOU	7:11
10.	"Houston" (ヒューストン)		Tobeta	Katamari Robo	4:16
11.	"Blue Orb"	Karie Kahimi	Tomoki Kanda (arr. Kanda, Kahimi)	Karie Kahimi	5:00
12.	"Katamari Holiday" (塊ホリディ)	Yuri Misawa	Misawa	Yuusama	5:37
13.	"Baby Universe" (ベイビーユニバース)	Hiroshi Okubo	Okubo	Maki Nomiya	5:06
14.	"DISCO☆PRINCE"	Okubo	Okubo	Kenji Ninuma (chorus by Katamari Choir)	7:01
15.	"Sunbaked Savanna" (灼熱のサバンナ)		Tobeta, Miyake, Sakai, Yano, Tohyama, Misawa (arr. Miyake, Yano)	John the Dog, Bigmouth the Duck, Yuuhi the Crow, Pe the Goat, Booby the Pig, Sexy the Cat and Nyuu the Cow	5:32
16.	"The Royal Academy of Katamari"		Katsuro Tajima		3:35
17.	"A Song for the King of Kings" (キングオブキングのうた)	Takeshi Ugajin, Miyake, Yuri Misumi	Katsuro Tajima (arr. Misumi, Miyake)	Tomu Miyazaki & Kitomu Miyaza	4:41
18.	"I Love You" (Bonus Track)		NAMCO		0:14
Total length:					1:19:45

== Me & My Katamari ==
Katamari Original Soundtrack Damacy

Soundtrack album by Yuu Miyake et al.
- Released: December 26, 2005
- Genre: Video game soundtrack
- Length: 1:48:55
- Label: Columbia Music Entertainment

Me & My Katamari (僕の私の塊魂, Boku no Watashi no Katamari Damashii; lit. "Our Clump Spirit") is the third game in the series, and was released on the PlayStation Portable by Namco in 2005. Its soundtrack was primarily composed of tracks from the previous two games, and has been described as "ranging from smoky lounge music to bleepy Japanese pop songs". The new tracks were composed by Yuu Miyake, Yuri Misawa, Hideki Tobeta, Yoshihito Yano, Akitaka Tohyama, and Naoki Tohyama; Misawa and Tohyama were new composers to the series, while Miyake reprised his role from the previous two games as sound director.

Katamari Original Soundtrack Damacy (塊オリジナルサウンドトラック魂, Katamari Orijinaru Saundotorakku Damashii) is the soundtrack album for the game. In addition to the new tracks, it includes previously unreleased tracks from We Love Katamari as tracks 10–17 on the first disc. Its second disc is made up of orchestral arrangements of previous tracks, tracks from other Namco games, three ambient noise tracks, two taiko drum tracks, and one more unreleased a cappella track from We Love Katamari. The album was released by Columbia Music Entertainment on December 26, 2005, with the catalog numbers COCX-33517~8. Its 37 tracks have a total length of 1:48:55.

In their review of the game, GameSpot called the music "catchy and eclectic", though they disapproved of the number of reused tracks from previous Katamari games. IGN was more ambivalent, saying that while they had no complaints about the music, they also saw "nothing to really praise either". Square Enix Music Online, in their review of the album, said that the album's "lack of humorous vocal tracks and high quality experimental instrumentals" meant that it did not match up to the previous soundtracks in the series. They additionally felt that the second disc did not add much to the album, and that on the whole the new Me & My Katamari tracks were not strong or numerous enough to make the purchase worthwhile. Unlike the previous two soundtracks in the series, the soundtrack to Me & My Katamari did not win any awards.

Track list

Disc 1
No.	Title	Lyrics	Music	Vocals	Length
1.	"Overture III"		Yuri Misawa, Yuu Miyake (arrangement by Miyake)		2:35
2.	"Katamari on the Funk" (塊オンザファンク)	Miyake, Naoki Toyama	Miyake	Katamari Soul Trains (Benny Diggs, John James, Lisa Fisher, Nick Richards, Kevin Owens, Paulette McWilliams)	10:22
3.	"Katamaresort" (カタマリゾート)		Hideki Tobeta		3:04
4.	"Shabadoobie" (シャバドゥビー)		Yoshihito Yano		3:01
5.	"Jesus Island" (ジーザスアイランド)		Miyake		4:47
6.	"Family Damacy" (Family魂)		Yano		4:41
7.	"Katamari on the Moog" (塊オンザムーグ)		Miyake, Akitaka Tohyama		0:32
8.	"Shine! Mr. Sunshine" (輝け! Mr.サンシャイン)	Miyake, Yano, Toyama	Misawa	Shigeru Matsuzaki	5:36
9.	"KATAMARHYTHM Box" (KATAMARHYTHM箱)		Yano, Tohyama		1:41
10.	"Canon of Kings"		Ryuichi Takada (arr. Miyake)		2:14
11.	"Meadowtron" (草原トロン)		Tobeta		4:27
12.	"One Chip March" (ワンチップマーチ)		Hiroshi Okubo		2:43
13.	"Do Re Mi Katamari Do" (ドレミカタマリド)		Miyake		3:13
14.	"Starlight Jamboree" (スターライト・ジャンボリー)		Miyake, Shoji Sugiyama		2:56
15.	"Everyone Dancing Katamari Damacy" (みんなDancing塊魂)		Miyake		1:00
16.	"LOVE & PEACE & Katamari Damacy" (LOVE＆PEACE＆塊魂)		Miyake, Sugiyama		0:43
17.	"Big Cosmos Salon" (大コスモサロン)		Katsuro Tajima		3:03

Disc 2
No.	Title	Lyrics	Music	Vocals	Length
1.	"In A Muddle"		Tajima		7:05
2.	"KANEWOOD EDGE ~ morning"		Tomomitsu Kaneko		0:40
3.	"None But the Lonely Heart... Op. 6-6" (HET，TOЛЬКО ТОТ，КОТЗНАЛ・・・Op. 6-6 Net, Tol'ko tot, kto Znal)	Johann Wolfgang von Goethe	P.I Tchaikovsky	Junko Nishi	2:51
4.	"Presto Scherzando"		Tajima		1:35
5.	"Appassionate, Allegro Moderato" (from Tales of Eternia Online)		Tajima		2:15
6.	"Super Taiko Damacy" (跳太鼓魂)		Miyake, Kaneko		0:59
7.	"None But the Lonely Heart... Op. 6-6" (HET，TOЛЬКО ТОТ，КОТЗНАЛ・・・Op. 6-6 Net, Tol'ko tot, kto Znal)	Goethe	Tchaikovsky (arr. Kaneko)	Junko Nishi	2:58
8.	"Super Taiko Damacy ~ Refrain" (跳太鼓魂～リフレイン)		Miyake, Kaneko		0:26
9.	"Sadness" (悲しみ)		Tajima		1:42
10.	"Stizzoso" (おこりん坊さん)		Tajima		1:08
11.	"KANEWOOD EDGE ~ day"		Kaneko		0:33
12.	"Con Energico"		Tajima		5:49
13.	"Sento nel core (I Feel a Pain in My Heart)" (私の心が痛みます) (arranged version from Splatterhouse)		Tajima		4:24
14.	"Sticky Taro" (くっつき太郎)	Dokaka	Dokaka	Dokaka	2:43
15.	"Misterioso"		Tajima		3:03
16.	"Chaotic Ambience" (カオティック アンビエンス)		Sakai		0:54
17.	"Andante, Con moto, Grandioso"		Tajima		1:41
18.	"Big Fire"		Tajima		1:55
19.	"Night Moo Moo" (ナイト・ムームー)		Tajima		0:41
20.	"KANEWOOD EDGE ~ star"		Kaneko		9:55

== Beautiful Katamari ==
Katamari Suteki Damacy

Soundtrack album by Tetsuya Uchida et al.
- Released: November 21, 2007
- Genre: Video game soundtrack
- Length: 1:10:04
- Label: Columbia Music Entertainment

Beautiful Katamari (ビューティフル塊魂, Byūtifuru Katamari Damashii; lit. "Beautiful Clump Spirit") is a video game produced by Namco Bandai for the Xbox 360 in 2007. Like previous games in the series, its music was composed by a large number of composers: Yuri Misumi, Yuu Miyake, Akitaka Tohyama, and Yoshihito Yano returned as previous composers for the series, and were joined by Rio Hamamoto, Yuji Masubuchi, Keiichi Okabe, Hiroto Sasaki, Tetsuya Uchida, and Ryo Watanabe. Yuu Miyake did not reprise his role as sound director for the game; this role was instead filled by Tetsuya Uchida. The music for Beautiful Katamari has been described as "the same sort of mix of J-pop, techno-infused jazz, and ambient electro" as that of the original game. Unlike Me & My Katamari, the majority of the music for the game was original, though a few tracks from earlier in the series were remixed.

Katamari Suteki Damacy (塊ステキ魂, Katamari Suteki Damashii; lit. "Clump Lovely Spirit") is the soundtrack album for the game. The album has 17 tracks and has a length of 1:10:04; it was published by Columbia Music Entertainment on November 21, 2007, with the catalog number COCX-34602.

GameSpot, in their review of the game, termed the music "one of the quirkiest and most oddly listenable soundtracks in gaming", and said that it fit the mood of the game as well as the soundtrack to the first two games. Square Enix Music Online, in their review of the soundtrack album, said that while it had "a lot of original worth", it was not any better than the first two soundtrack albums of the series and instead came across as more of the same. They termed the album overall as a "bit underwhelming" and marred by a few "dud" tracks. The album reached #253 on the Japanese Oricon charts.

Track list
No.	Title	Lyrics	Music	Vocals	Length
1.	"Katamari Dancing"	Kimio Yudate	Yuji Masubuchi	Takashi Utsunomiya	4:56
2.	"Unity" (団結)	Akihiro Ishihara	Hiroto Sasaki	iM@S ALLSTARS+	5:47
3.	"BOYFRIEND A GOGO"	Shougo Yasukawa	Keiichi Okabe	Iyo Matsumoto	4:56
4.	"Bless My Stars"	Akitaka Tohyama	Tohyama	Ranran Suzuki	6:21
5.	"Sayonara Rolling Star"	Yoshihito Yano	Yano	Aya Hirayama	5:33
6.	"Harvest of Love" (恋の稲刈り)	Kimio Yudate	Yuji Masubuchi	Hitomi Ishikawa	6:38
7.	"INTO THE SKY"	Itokubo (Maria & Keiko Kubota)	Masubuchi	Itokubo	4:26
8.	"Katamarity" (カタマリティー)	Uri Misumi	Misumi	Kyoko Sekihara (of BARBEE BOYS & Fukumimi)	5:38
9.	"Guru Guru Gravity" (ぐるぐるグラビティ)	Tetsuya Uchida, Yuu Miyake	Miyake, Yano, Uchida	Nori Horikoshi	5:04
10.	"Colorful Heart" (カラフルハート)	Yano	Yano	Yuki Saito	5:06
11.	"PROLOGUE"		Rio Hamamoto		1:08
12.	"Cosmic Lounge" (コズミックラウンジ)		Ryo Watanabe		2:36
13.	"Katamari Planet" (カタマリ惑星)		Uchida		3:26
14.	"STAR! STAR! STAR!"		Uchida		3:41
15.	"Everyone's Mambo" (みんなのマンボ)		Uchida		1:07
16.	"Prince Lounge" (王子ラウンジ)		Uchida		1:41
17.	"EPILOGUE"		Hamamoto		1:52
Total length:					1:10:04

== Katamari Forever ==
Katamari Damacy Tribute Original Soundtrack: Katamari Takeshi

Soundtrack album by Yuu Miyake et al.
- Released: August 19, 2009
- Genre: Video game soundtrack
- Length: 2:38:21
- Label: Columbia Music Entertainment

Katamari Forever, known in Japan as Katamari Damacy TRIBUTE (塊魂TRIBUTE; lit. "Katamari Damashii Tribute"), was released for the PlayStation 3 in 2009 by Namco Bandai. The music for the game includes a number of remixed tracks from previous iterations of the series, using a combination of "electric" and "organic" sounds according to the sound director Yuu Miyake. Miyake employed the help of over 20 other Japanese artists and remixers to help the soundtrack, which was designed to act as part of a "musical trilogy" with the soundtrack to Katamari Damacy and We Love Katamari. This was accomplished by choosing tracks from those games that were either fan or staff favorites and having them remixed by both Japanese and non-Japanese artists, though Miyake notes that the majority of the artists were Japanese as he did not know many non-Japanese musicians, the same problem that kept non-Japanese artists out of the first two soundtracks of the "trilogy". Miyake has stated that focusing so much on using music from earlier in the series made it very challenging to still allow each artist to explore their creativity, and does not intend to repeat this strategy if a new game is ever made.

Katamari Damacy Tribute Original Soundtrack: Katamari Takeshi (「塊魂トリビュート」オリジナル・サウンドトラック) is the soundtrack album for the game. It was released on August 19, 2009, by Columbia Music Entertainment with the catalog numbers COCX-35745~6. Its 36 tracks on two discs span a duration of 2:38:21. The musical styles used in the soundtrack have been described as an "eclectic mix of sunny J-pop, throbbing dance music, jolly jazz, and more".

GameSpot, in their review of the game, said that Katamari Forever "carries on the series' tradition of wildly catchy soundtracks" and said that the remixes of the older songs "sound terrific". PALGN concurred, calling it a "great soundtrack". The album was received warmly by reviewers such as Square Enix Music Online, who said that it was full of "fresh, diverse, and often downright weird remixes". Describing it as much more of a spiritual successor to the original game's soundtrack than the prior sequels, they said that it kept the "upbeat, humorous, and sentimental feel" of the songs in the original while taking them in new directions. The album reached #158 on the Japanese Oricon charts.

Disc 1
No.	Title	Lyrics	Music	Remixed/Re-Arranged By	Length
1.	"Katamari on the Rhodes"		Yuu Miyake, Yoshihito Yano	Yuri Misumi	1:30
2.	"Katamari on the Wings" (塊オンザウィングス)	Miyake, Yano	Miyake, Yano (vocals by Takuya Ōhashi)	Yano	4:25
3.	"Katamaresort Song" (カタマリゾート・ソング)	Hideki Tobeta	Tobeta (vo. Saigenji)	Tobeta	4:52
4.	"Bluffing Spirit" (つよがり魂)	Keita Takahashi	Asuka Sakai	GUIRO	5:00
5.	"Katamari on the Rocks" (塊オンザロック) (5cm Prince Remix)	AFRA	Miyake	AFRA	5:32
6.	"MONOCHROME"		Misumi	Misumi	0:39
7.	"Galactic S-O-U-L"	Yano, Naotaka Higashiyama	Yano	Buffalo Daughter	7:31
8.	"Campus DAYDREAMER" (校庭DAYDREAMER)		Misumi	Misumi	2:25
9.	"Scorching Savanna High School Performance" (灼熱のサバンナ高等学校)		Yano, Miyake, Sakai, Tobeta, Misumi, Akitaka Tohyama	Horikoshi School Brass Band (conductor: Takashi Yoshizawa) & Hiroki Takahashi	6:45
10.	"Houston" (ヒューストン)	Tobeta	Tobeta	KIRINJI	4:35
11.	"Cherry Blossom Color Season" (さくらいろの季節) (fanfare mix)	Miyake	Miyake	Beautiful Hummingbird	5:55
12.	"Lonely Rolling No More"	Yano, Miyake	Yano (vo. Natsuko & Yuusama)	Miyake	5:39
13.	"You are Smart" (RAAGINIA SOFT MIX)		Tohyama	SOFT (Japanese band)	9:44
14.	"Cosmos" (ウチュウ)		Yano (vo. Yukiko Yamamoto)		2:14
15.	"SHADOW AND LIGHT"	Yano	Yano (vo. Shigeru Matsuzaki)		5:28
16.	"Green Village"		Tobeta, Tohyama		2:17
17.	"Fuga #9998"		Keigo Hoashi		1:45
18.	"Fuga #9999"		Hoashi		2:48

Disc 2
No.	Title	Lyrics	Music	Remixed/Re-Arranged By	Length
1.	"Katamari On The Funk" (Señor Coconut's "Katamambo!" remix)	Miyake, Higashiyama	Miyake	Uwe Schmidt	4:43
2.	"Gin & Tonic & Red Red Roses" (真っ赤なバラとジントニック) (YMCK 8bit Mix)	Sakai	Sakai	YMCK	3:17
3.	"Everlasting Love + You"	Tohyama, Jun Tohyama	Tohyama (vo. Leah Dizon)	Tohyama	6:07
4.	"The Royal Academy of Katamari" (Kimitaka Matsumae Remix)		Katsuro Tajima	Kimitaka Matsumae	6:22
5.	"Everlasting Love" (atom™ remix)			Schmidt	3:45
6.	"Sayonara Rolling Star" (サヨナラ Rolling Star) (Yuri's Mixx)	Yano	Yano, Miyake, Nathanael Yam, Tadanobu Numata (vo. Micazo)	Misumi	6:36
7.	"Katamari Spirit"		Yano, Tohyama		1:07
8.	"Katamari Dancing All Night"	Yano, Higashiyama	Yano (vo. RoboKing)	Tetsuya Uchida	5:22
9.	"The Moon and The Prince (and LEOPALDON MIX)" (月と王子 (とレオパルドンMIX))	Tohyama, LEOPALDON	Tohyama	LEOPALDON	5:30
10.	"Mushroom Parade"		Tohyama, Tobeta		1:02
11.	"Do Re Mi Katamari Do" (ドレミカタマリド) (-rh rehabilitation re-arrange-)		Misumi	Rei Harakami	4:19
12.	"Katamari on the Swing" (塊オンザスウィング) (SEXY-SYNTHESIZER ALL ABOUT namco Mix)	Miyake, Yano	Miyake, Yano	SEXY-SYNTHESIZER	4:55
13.	"Robotic Vision"		Tohyama, Tobeta		1:23
14.	"Cosmic Message"		Tohyama, Tobeta, Miyake		1:18
15.	"Be Gorgeous"		Tohyama		2:49
16.	"Nana-Nan Damacy" (Hardfloor Remix)		Miyake	Hardfloor	8:01
17.	"Nana-Nan Damacy" (Hardfloor Alternative-Remix)		Miyake	Hardfloor	8:45
18.	"Last Chaotic Ambience" (ラスト・カオティックアンビエンス)		Miyake		3:56

== Touch My Katamari ==
Katamari Damacy Novita Original Soundtrack: Katamori Damacy

Soundtrack album by Taku Inoue et al.
- Released: December 21, 2011
- Genre: Video game soundtrack
- Length: 1:12:12
- Label: Columbia Music Entertainment

Touch My Katamari, known in Japan as Katamari Damacy No-Vita (塊魂ノビータ, Katamari Damashī Nobīta), is a video game produced by Namco Bandai Games for the PlayStation Vita in 2011. As has become commonplace for the series, its music was composed by a large number of composers: a large team headed by Taku Inoue included series veteran Yuu Miyake, Ken Inaoka, BAKUBAKU DOKIN, Akitaka Tohyama, Hiroyuki Kawada, Yoshihito Yano, Yuichi Nakamura, Hiroshi Okubo, and Trine. The music includes both original pieces as well as many remixes of pieces from prior games, such as a new version of "Lonely Rolling Star". Inoue was charged by Miyake with making the music of the game "newer and fresher", as Miyake was tired of the series repeating the same concepts, and Inoue attempted to impart his own style into the original pieces and to use new styles of arrangements.

The music was released in several forms. First, as a soundtrack album, Katamari Damacy Novita Original Soundtrack: Katamori Damacy (塊魂ノ･ビ～タ オリジナルサウンドトラック 「かたもりだましい」), which contains 16 tracks and has a length of 1:12:12. It was published by Columbia Music Entertainment on December 21, 2011, with the catalog number COCX-37131. An additional two digital-only publications of songs from the game, titled Kamatari Damacy - Touch My Katamari Original Sound Track 2 and Katamari Aventur Damacy - Touch My Katamari Original Sound Track 3, were released on April 10 and November 20, 2012, with eleven and three songs and lengths of 33:01 and 10:10, respectively.

Christopher Huynh of Video Game Music Online (formerly Square Enix Music Online), in their review of Katamori Damacy, felt that the soundtrack had the energy of the first few soundtracks in the series, while providing a more cohesive experience by not including "filler" tracks like previous albums.

Track list
No.	Title	Lyrics	Music	Vocals	Length
1.	"NGC1976"		パッハ		1:38
2.	"Katamari on the Stage" (塊オン・ザ・ステージ)	Taku Inoue	Inoue	Shigeru Matsuzaki	5:04
3.	"Rehabilitation"		Ken Inaoka		1:54
4.	"Alien" (エイリアン)	Yuu Miyake, BAKUBAKU DOKIN	Miyake, BAKUBAKU DOKIN		4:12
5.	"Don't Give Up"		Akitaka Tohyama		5:13
6.	"Katamari on the Funk" (塊オンザファンク) (Takeshi Nakatsuka edit)	Naotaka Higashiyama, Miyake	Miyake (remix by Nakatsuka)		5:54
7.	"Katamari Exotica" (カタマリ・エキゾチカ)		Hiroyuki Kawada		5:29
8.	"Lonely Rolling Star" (re-arranged by Masahiko Osaka)		Yoshihito Yano (arrangement by Osaka)		4:18
9.	"Katamari on the Rocks" (塊オンザロック) (re-arranged by Masahiko Osaka)		Miyake (Arr. Osaka)		4:44
10.	"Cosmomule Cosmopolitan" (コスモミュール・コスモポリタン)		Yuichi Nakamura		4:53
11.	"Shabadoobie" (シャバドゥビー) (Takeshi Nakatsuka edit)		Yano (remix by Nakatsuka)		4:35
12.	"Katamari of Love" (愛のカタマリー) (SEXY-SYNTHESIZER Remix)	Yano	Yano (remix by SEXY-SYNTHESIZER)		4:28
13.	"Hello World" (ハロー・ワールド)	Hiroshi Okubo, Inoue	Okubo		5:22
14.	"Katamari LOVEMIN" (塊LOVEMIN)		trine		4:38
15.	"2011's Sky and Music" (2011の空と音楽)	Yano	Yano	Asako Toki	5:03
16.	"Across the Katamari" (アクロス・ザ・カタマリ)	Inoue	Inoue	Kazuhiro Momo (from MO'SOME TONEBENDER)	4:47

Original Sound Track 2
No.	Title	Music	Length
1.	"Katamari On The Backstage"	Inoue	1:09
2.	"King of the Dance Floor"	Inoue	4:32
3.	"ACID EUTRON #007" (Baraduke Remix)	Yuriko Keino, Norio Nakagata (arr. eutron)	4:58
4.	"Star King"	Inoue	2:03
5.	"Star Prince"	Inoue	2:02
6.	"Jupiter Dub No.404"	Inoue	3:15
7.	"Noby Noby Prince"	Miyake	3:37
8.	"Little Help"	Inoue	2:11
9.	"Revolution Katamari"	Inoue	2:23
10.	"Kakatatamamariri 1"	Inoue	2:05
11.	"Katamari On Namco"	Toshio Kai, Nobuyuki Ohnogi, Yuriko Keino, Junko Ozawa, Miyake (arr. Sexy-Synthesizer)	4:46

Original Sound Track 3
No.	Title	Music	Length
1.	"Kakatatamamariri 2"	Inoue feat. Sachi from Harineko	4:32
2.	"White Katyusha"	Jesahm feat. trine	3:15
3.	"Katamari on the Ondo"	Miyake	2:23

== Katamari Damacy Rolling Live ==
Katamari Damacy Rolling Live is a video game produced by Namco Bandai for iOS and macOS in 2025. The first new game in the series in nearly a decade, it again had an ensemble of composers, including Shogo Nomura, Mei Osawa, Sho Okada, Kanaya Oki, Licht Tsuboi, steμ, Ryo Watanabe, trine, Yuji Masubuchi, Yoshihito Yano, and Yuu Miyake. Shogo Nomura contributed five tracks, the only composer to have more than one. The music had a soundtrack album simultaneously released on streaming services on April 3, 2025, as Katamari Damacy Rolling LIVE (Original Soundtrack -Lalamari Damacy), with sixteen tracks and a duration of 61:17.

Track list
No.	Title	Lyrics	Music	Vocals	Length
1.	"Katamari on the Dream" (塊オンザドリーム)	Shogo Nomura	Shogo Nomura	Cassie Wei	3:49
2.	"Midnight Tryst" (丑三つふたり)	Mei Osawa	Mei Osawa	Nagayama Maki	3:40
3.	"Bun-San Body" (ブンサン・ボディ)	Sho Okada	Sho Okada	Natsuki Ogoda	4:17
4.	"Katadoru Sandbox" (かたどる砂場)	Kanaya Oki	Kanaya Oki	Kohei Hiromura	3:32
5.	"Katamari's 5AM Morning Routine" (塊のモーニングルーティンに密着取材してみた)		Licht Tsuboi		4:33
6.	"Parallel Damacy" (パラレル魂)	Nomura	Nomura	Masakazu Hara	4:19
7.	"Song for Mixing a Bunch of Colors" (いろんな色を混ぜたときのうた)	steμ	steμ	asaco	5:07
8.	"Katamari of Ka/Ta/Ma/Ri" (「か」「た」「ま」「り」の塊)	Rihito Tsuboi	Rihito Tsuboi		4:29
9.	"STARRY NIGHT FEVER"	Ryo Watanabe	Ryo Watanabe	PannoMimimi	4:32
10.	"Coro Coro Cue" (ころころCue)		trine		4:25
11.	"SUTEKINANOKADEPARADE" (ステキナノカデパレード)	LindaAI-CUE	Yuji Masubuchi	Sana Natori	4:30
12.	"Making a Star" (星を作れたら)	Yoshihito Yano	Yoshihito Yano	Kaho Kidoguchi	4:52
13.	"Katamari Channel"		Nomura		2:52
14.	"Prince and Woodwinds" (王子ウッドウインズ)		Nomura		2:36
15.	"CANDYNEON"		Nomura		2:22
16.	"Katamari Nah-Nah ~Live~" (ナナナン塊~Live~)		Yuu Miyake	Yuu-sama	1:22

== Once Upon a Katamari ==
Once Upon A KATAMARI Original Soundtrack -KATAMARI no MANI MANI-

Soundtrack album by Katamari Damacy Series SOUND TEAM
- Released: December 17, 2025
- Genre: Video game soundtrack
- Length: 3:26:36
- Label: Bandai Namco Entertainment

Once Upon a Katamari is the latest game in the series, developed by RENGAME and published by Bandai Namco for Nintendo Switch, PlayStation 5, Xbox Series X, Windows and Nintendo Switch 2. The game is the first original console installment in the series since Touch My Katamari (2011), and was released on October 24, 2025. The music was again composed by a large ensemble of artists. The soundtrack album, Once Upon A KATAMARI Original Soundtrack -KATAMARI no MANI MANI-, was released both digitally and physically on November 13, 2025 and December 15, 2025 respectively. It has 78 tracks across 3 discs, with a total length of 3:26:36.

Disc 1
No.	Title	Length
1.	"Overture IV"	1:50
2.	"Katamari Time!"	6:21
3.	"The King's Fugue 2025"	1:09
4.	"YangYang"	3:50
5.	"Katamariism"	3:42
6.	"Eeja Eeja naika"	3:37
7.	"skyscraper(s)"	3:44
8.	"Katamari Damacy"	4:36
9.	"Once Upon A KATAMARI ~Prologue"	2:27
10.	"The King's Fugue 2025 ~Latter Half"	1:22
11.	"Suisei Biyori"	4:19
12.	"Kokon-Tozai Katamari-Doucyu"	3:19
13.	"Power of Katamari Damacy"	3:45
14.	"San Francisco Katamari Boys Chorus Song"	5:29
15.	"Katamari on the Doun"	4:20
16.	"CHILL PRINCE"	3:12
17.	"DIVER"	3:34
18.	"Time Scales"	2:09
19.	"Rising Star"	0:13
20.	"Aishiteirukara"	4:25
21.	"No matter how many times I'm reborn"	2:24
Total length:		69:47

Disc 2
No.	Title	Length
1.	"SUTEKINANOKASTRINGS"	2:58
2.	"Edo Japan"	1:49
3.	"Making Myself"	1:56
4.	"Astral Treasures Waltz"	2:19
5.	"Center of the Katamari"	2:33
6.	"American Frontier"	2:28
7.	"Nothing to be afraid of"	3:33
8.	"Voyage at Sea"	1:45
9.	"Time to YOSORO!!"	4:12
10.	"Ancient Greece"	1:50
11.	"JOY:Syrtos By Gardeners Who Praised Katamari"	3:04
12.	"Ancient Egypt"	2:06
13.	"Nananan Wonders"	5:09
14.	"CLASSICME"	1:29
15.	"Stone Age"	2:00
16.	"Katamari Tribe"	3:49
17.	"Ice Age"	1:58
18.	"ICE CUBE SOUL"	4:44
19.	"Jurassic Period"	2:11
20.	"Goro Goro Blithely"	4:08
21.	"Present Day"	2:15
22.	"Cosmos Scroll"	3:31
23.	"Makimono Ambience"	1:33
24.	"Sports Time"	0:54
25.	"Rising Fighting Spirit Star"	0:14
Total length:		64:28

Disc 3
No.	Title	Length
1.	"Time Travel ~With SFX"	0:25
2.	"The King's Drama Tittle"	0:06
3.	"The King's Drama Ep.1"	0:58
4.	"The King's Drama Ep.2"	1:12
5.	"The King's Drama Ep.3"	0:57
6.	"The King's Drama Ep.4"	1:15
7.	"The King's Drama Ep.5"	0:45
8.	"Once Upon A KATAMARI ~Tutorial (Unused Tracks)"	1:38
9.	"The Queens's Drama Tittle"	0:07
10.	"The Queens's Drama Ep.1"	0:35
11.	"The Queens's Drama Ep.2"	0:35
12.	"The Queens's Drama Ep.3"	0:38
13.	"The Queens's Drama Ep.4"	0:42
14.	"The Queens's Drama Ep.5"	0:52
15.	"The Queens's Drama Ep.6"	0:52
16.	"The Queens's Drama Ep.7"	0:57
17.	"Earth Revival ~With SFX"	0:31
18.	"Stage Clear ~With SFX"	1:02
19.	"Katamari Time! (Instrumental)"	6:21
20.	"YangYang (Instrumental)"	3:49
21.	"Katamariism (Instrumental)"	3:42
22.	"Eeja Eeja naika (Instrumental)"	3:37
23.	"skyscraper(s) (Instrumental)"	3:43
24.	"Katmari Damacy (Instrumental)"	4:35
25.	"Suisei Biyori (Instrumental)"	4:19
26.	"Kokon-Tozai (Instrumental)"	3:19
27.	"Power of Katamari Damacy (Instrumental)"	3:44
28.	"San Francisco Katamari Boys Chorus Song (Instrumental)"	5:29
29.	"Katamari on the Doun (Instrumental)"	4:20
30.	"CHILL PRINCE (Instrumental)"	3:12
31.	"DIVER (Instrumental)"	3:37
32.	"Aishiteirukara (Instrumental)"	4:27
Total length:		72:21
