= Satoru Kōsaki =

Japanese music composer and arranger (born 1974)

Satoru Kōsaki 神前 暁
- Also known as: Shinji Ikeda
- Born: September 16, 1974 (age 52); Toyonaka, Osaka, Japan
- Genres: J-pop; anison; synthpop; jazz; techno; classical; video game music; Shibuya-kei; Akishibu-kei
- Occupations: Composer; arranger; producer; musician
- Instrument: Trumpet
- Years active: 1997–present

Satoru Kōsaki (神前 暁, Kōsaki Satoru; born September 16, 1974) is a Japanese music composer and arranger. He is best known for his work on anime, including Lucky Star, The Melancholy of Haruhi Suzumiya, Monogatari, Beastars and The Apothecary Diaries. He worked at Namco, where he primarily composed soundtracks for video games. Since 2005, he has been affiliated with Keiichi Okabe's music production company Monaca, where he has often collaborated with his colleagues to produce soundtracks for anime and other media.

== Biography ==
=== Early life ===
Kōsaki was born on September 16, 1974, in Toyonaka, Osaka, Japan. He began playing the piano and Electone, at the age of three. His parents also played classical guitar and frequently played songs by classical guitarists within the household. Although he eventually ceased playing the piano, he played the trumpet in his junior high school's brass band. He listened to fusion artists such as Casiopea and T-Square, as well as pop artists such as Hikaru Genji, and developed an interest in video game music through the Mycom BASIC Magazine, where he started to program music on a PC-9801.

As an information engineering student at Kyoto University, he developed an interest in composing music as a member of the amateur circle "Yoshida Music Factory" (吉田音楽製作所, Yoshida Ongaku Seisakusho), which he decided to join instead of the university's brass club. He purchased a Roland JV-1000 for composition purposes, using a 4-track multitrack recorder. The circle created music in a wide variety of genres, so he listened to several albums for inspiration. Director Yutaka Yamamoto, who was also at the same university, asked Kōsaki to compose the soundtrack for his film Onnen Sentai Ressentiment, as well as playing the role of Emperor Komuro. As he did not have any formal music education, his process for creating music involved listening to existing music and imitating styles, but realized this approach would be risky due to lacking a deep understanding of each genre.

=== Namco (1999–2005) ===
After his graduation in 1999, he applied to join Namco and submitted a demo tape consisting of tracks he composed while at university, as he admired the music of Namco composer Nobuyoshi Sano and wanted to work with him. After receiving an offer, he joined the company, where his first work was composing music for the arcade game Aqua Rush. He used Microsoft Excel to compose and program the music, which he did not find difficult due to his previous music programming experiences.

Kōsaki went on to compose tracks for video game series including Tekken and Kotoba no Puzzle, along with working as an in-house trumpeter for various games. Kotoba no Puzzle: Mojipittan features Shibuya-kei-inspired music, with influences from early Namco game music and 80s synthpop. He aimed to write catchy melodies, which was a trial-and-error process. Its theme song is "Futari no Mojipittan", which features vocals by Moji-kun's voice actress Nana Furuhara. For his work on Tekken games, he created music in genres such as techno and breakbeat; he did not consider these genres to be his area of expertise, but tried his best to maintain a quality on par with other composers involved.

During his time at Namco, he was also a member of fellow Namco composer Hiroshi Okubo's doujin circle nanosounds, where he contributed original tracks to a number of albums. He also participated in J-pop competitions, but was unsuccessful in all of them. Still in contact with director Yamamoto, he would also score the music for the 2005 OVA Munto 2: Beyond the Walls of Time, using the alias Shinji Ikeda as he was still employed at Namco at the time. Citing a desire to compose a greater variety of music without restrictions, he left the company towards the end of the year to join Monaca, a production group founded the previous year by his former colleague Keiichi Okabe, who had previously left Namco in 2000 for similar reasons.

=== Monaca (2005–present) ===
Kōsaki's first major project with Monaca was the soundtrack for the 2006 anime television series The Melancholy of Haruhi Suzumiya. Series production director Yamamoto recommended Kōsaki as the composer for the anime, who found it difficult to get involved in such a large scale project outside of Namco, serving as another reason for quitting the company to join Monaca. An album containing three of his compositions ("God knows...", "Lost my music", and "Koi no Mikuru Densetsu") for the anime sold more than 136,000 copies in Japan and peaked at #5 on the weekly Oricon Singles Chart. "God knows..." in particular has received a lot of acclaim, although Kōsaki found it challenging to compose due to having little experience with band recording and playing guitar, so he studied band rock music. Although he often incorporated live musicians in his previous Namco work, this served as the first time he composed a track fully performed by a band.

In 2007, he composed the soundtrack for the anime television series Lucky Star; the series' opening theme "Motteke! Sailor Fuku" peaked at #2 on the chart upon release. It would also go on to win the 2007 Radio Kansai Award, a subset of the Animation Kobe Theme Song Award. He found the workload overwhelming, as prior to joining Monaca he was not used to composing a large number of tracks under time constraints.

He served as the lead composer for Bakemonogatari in 2009, composing all of the background music and most of the songs. The song "Renai Circulation", features lyrics by Meg Rock and vocals by Kana Hanazawa as character Nadeko Sengoku. Kōsaki felt it would be interesting to feature Hanazawa rapping, inspired by Shibuya-kei group Kaseki Cider. The song received acclaim in particular and inspired a wave of cover dances and mash-ups on Niconico during the 2010s. It later found further popularity on TikTok in the late 2010s, which intrigued Kōsaki as many people who listened to it did not know about it at the time of release.

In December 2010, he announced an indefinite hiatus from his work due to poor health. He began a second illness-related hiatus in February 2014 and returned to work in January 2015. During this time, he re-studied music theory, as he previously felt insecure about not having formal music education.

In 2019, he worked on the anime Beastars, which features gypsy-inspired music. In 2020, a compilation album titled Satoru Kosaki 20th Anniversary Selected Works "DAWN" was released to commemorate 20 years of being a composer. It includes a selection of his most successful songs, while the limited edition release also includes a selection of anime BGM. In 2021, he composed for the anime Vivy: Fluorite Eye's Song; the following year, the anime won the Best Music Anime award at AniTrendz's 8th Annual Anime Trending Awards.

== Works ==
=== Anime ===
Soundtrack composer Other credits only (e.g. opening/ending themes)

Year	Title	Notes
2005	Munto 2: Beyond the Walls of Time	& theme song "Toki no Kabe o Koete", lyrics; as Shinji Ikeda
2006	The Melancholy of Haruhi Suzumiya	& insert songs "God knows...", "Lost my music", and "Koi no Mikuru Densetsu"
2007	Lucky Star	& opening theme "Motteke! Sailor Fuku", various insert songs
2008	Penguin Musume Heart	opening theme "Ren'ai Jiyū Shoujo"
2008	Sekirei	opening theme "Sekirei", ending theme "Dear sweet heart"
2008	Lucky Star OVA	
2008	Kannagi: Crazy Shrine Maidens	& opening theme "Motto Hade ni ne!", ending themes "Musuhi no Toki" and "Shirigeya no Theme", various insert songs
2009	Sora o Miageru Shōjo no Hitomi ni Utsuru Sekai	& insert song "Montaro no Uta"; with various others
2009	The Melancholy of Haruhi-chan Suzumiya	& opening theme "Ima Made no Arasuji", ending theme "Atogaki no Yō na Mono"
2009	Nyorōn Churuya-san	& opening theme "Ima Made no Arasuji", ending theme "Atogaki no Yō na Mono"
2009	The Melancholy of Haruhi Suzumiya	second season; & opening theme "Super Driver"
2009	Tenjōbito to Akutobito Saigo no Tatakai	with various others
2009	Bakemonogatari	& opening themes "staple stable", "Kaerimichi", "ambivalent world", "Renai Circulation", and "sugar sweet nightmare"
2010	The Disappearance of Haruhi Suzumiya	with Ryuichi Takada, Keigo Hoashi, and Kakeru Ishihama
2010	Working!!	opening theme "Someone Else", ending theme "Go to Heart Edge"
2010	Sekirei: Pure Engagement	ending theme "Onnaji Kimochi"
2010	Highschool of the Dead	ending theme "Under the Honey Shine"
2010	Ore no Imōto ga Konna ni Kawaii Wake ga Nai	& ending theme "Tadaima.", insert song "Meteor Impact"
2010	Star Driver: Kagayaki no Takuto	& various insert songs; with various others
2011	Fractale	insert song "Hiru no Hoshi"
2011	Wandering Son	with Keiichi Okabe and Keigo Hoashi
2011	A Channel	& opening theme "Morning Arch", ending theme "Humming Girl"; with Ryuichi Takada, Keigo Hoashi, and Kakeru Ishihama
2011	The Idolmaster	opening theme "Ready!!"
2012	Nisemonogatari	& opening themes "Futakotome", "marshmallow justice", and "Platinum Disco"
2012	Natsume Yūjin-chō Shi	ending theme "Takaramono"
2012	A Channel & smile	opening theme "Balloon Theater"
2012	Joshiraku	opening theme "Oato ga Yoroshikutte... yo!"
2012	Blast of Tempest	ending theme "Happy Endings"
2012	Arata-naru Sekai	theme song "Arata-naru Sekai"
2012	Nekomonogatari (Black)	& opening theme "perfect slumbers", ending theme "Kieru Daydream"
2013	Star Driver The Movie	& insert song "Hikari no Octave"; with various others
2013	Vividred Operation	ending theme "Vivid Shining Sky"
2013	Muromi-san	opening theme "Nanatsu no Umi yori Kimi no Umi"
2013	Ore no Imōto ga Konna ni Kawaii Wake ga Nai.	& insert song "Planet Burst"
2013	Monogatari Series: Second Season	& opening themes "chocolate insomnia", "happy bite", "Mōsō Express", "fast love", and "Kogarashi Sentiment", ending theme "Sono Koe o Oboeteru"
2014	The Idolmaster Movie: Beyond the Brilliant Future!	theme song "M@STERPIECE"
2014	Wake Up, Girls! Seven Idols	theme song "Tachiagare!", insert song "Ōzora no Prism"
2014	Wake Up, Girls!	opening theme "7 Girls War"
2014	Captain Earth	insert song "Mugen no Hana"
2016	Kizumonogatari Part 1: Tekketsu	with Ryuichi Takada, Keigo Hoashi, and Ken Namba
2016	Koyomimonogatari	
2016	Monster Strike	with Keiichi Hirokawa and Kuniyuki Takahashi
2016	Anne Happy	with various others
2016	Kizumonogatari Part 2: Nekketsu	& ending theme "étoile et toi"
2016	Monster Strike The Movie	with Kuniyuki Takahashi, Ryuichi Takada, and Keiichi Hirokawa
2017	Kizumonogatari Part 3: Reiketsu	& ending theme "étoile et toi [édition le blanc]"
2017	Frame Arms Girl	opening theme "Tiny Tiny"
2017	Owarimonogatari	& opening themes "terminal terminal" and "dreamy date drive"
2017	Fireworks	& insert song "Forever Friends" (rearrangement; original composition by REMEDIOS)
2017	Wake Up, Girls! New Chapter	insert song "Kakeru x Kakeru"
2018	Fate/Extra Last Encore	& opening theme "Bright Burning Shout"; with various others
2019	Zoku Owarimonogatari	opening theme "07734"
2019	Beastars	& ending themes "Le Zoo" and "Floating Story on the Moon"; insert songs "Many Stories" and "A Tale of Moon"; with Ryuichi Takada
2020	Maesetsu!	with Oliver Good and Keita Inoue
2021	Vivy: Fluorite Eye's Song	& opening theme & ending themes "Sing My Pleasure" and "Fluorite Eye's Song"; insert songs "My Code", "A Tender Moon Tempo" (brass arrangement), "Galaxy Anthem", and "Harmony of One's Heart"
2022	Aharen-san Is Indecipherable	& ending theme "AHAREN HEART"; with Oliver Good and Keita Inoue
2023	The Apothecary Diaries	& insert songs "Ashita o Tazunete", "Secchuuka", and "Sōkū no Honō"; with Kevin Penkin and Alisa Okehazama
2023	Protocol: Rain	with Oliver Good and Keita Inoue
2023	The Diary of Ochibi-san	
2024	Beastars Final Season - Part 1	opening theme "Into The World"; with issei
2024	Monogatari Series: Off & Monster Season	episodes #1-6

=== Video games ===
Soundtrack composer Other credits only (e.g. performances, insert songs)

Year	Title	Notes
1999	Aqua Rush	with Akitaka Tohyama and Yoshihito Yano
2000	Tekken Tag Tournament	PS2 version; & trumpet; with various others
2001	Mr. Driller G	trumpet
2001	Tekken 4	arcade version; with Yuu Miyake and Akitaka Tohyama
2001	Kotoba no Puzzle: Mojipittan	arcade version; & various insert songs, lyrics, vocals
2002	Taiko no Tatsujin 3	trumpet
2002	Tekken 4	PS2 version; with various others
2002	Star Trigon	with Jesahm, Hiroshi Okubo and Tetsukazu Nakanishi
2002	Mr. Driller Drill Land	trumpet
2003	Kotoba no Puzzle: Mojipittan	PS2 version; & various insert songs, lyrics, vocals
2003	Yumeria	& trumpet, melodica
2003	R: Racing Evolution	with various others
2004	Katamari Damacy	trumpet
2004	Xenosaga Freaks	Xenopittan minigame only; & various insert songs; with Hiroshi Okubo
2004	Kotoba no Puzzle: Mojipittan Daijiten	& trumpet, various insert songs, lyrics, vocals; with various others
2004	Tekken 5	arcade version; with various others
2005	Tekken 5	PS2 version; & theme song "Sparking"; with various others
2005	Mobile Suit Gundam: One Year War	trumpet; with various others
2005	We Love Katamari	trumpet
2005	The Idolmaster	arcade version; insert song "Mahou wo Kakete!", lyrics
2005	Taiko no Tatsujin: Tobikkiri! Anime Special	opening theme "Hibike! Taiko no Tatsujin", trumpet
2005	Tekken: Dark Resurrection	with various others
2005	Taiko no Tatsujin: Wai Wai Happy Rokudaime	insert song "Swan Lake ~still a duckling~"; trumpet
2005	Me & My Katamari	trumpet
2006	Rappelz	with various others
2007	Kotoba no Puzzle: Mojipittan DS	
2007	The Idolmaster	Xbox 360 version; insert song "Go My Way!!", trumpet
2007	Beautiful Katamari	trumpet
2007	Tekken 6	"Artificial Ruins"
2007	The Promise of Haruhi Suzumiya	with Hiromoto Nakaya
2008	Lucky Star: Ryōō Gakuen Ōtōsai	opening theme "Hamatte Sabotte Oh My God!"
2008	The Idolmaster Live For You!	insert song "My Song"
2008	Kotoba no Puzzle: Mojipittan Wii	
2008	Secret Game: Killer Queen [ja]	opening theme "Secret Game"
2009	The Idolmaster SP	insert song "Kiramekirari"
2009	Hatsune Miku: Project DIVA	opening theme "The Secret Garden", insert song "Dear Cocoa Girls"
2009	The Idolmaster Dearly Stars	theme song "Hello!!"
2009	Sekirei: Gifts from the Future	ending theme "Survive Baby Survive!"
2010	Tantei Opera Milky Holmes	opening theme "Ameagari no Mirai", ending theme "Kikoenakutemo Arigatо̄"
2013	The Idolmaster Shiny TV	insert song "Sora"
2018	Monogatari Series PucPuc	theme song "Wicked Prince"
2019	Yin Yang Shi: Bai Wen Pai	& various insert songs; with Ryuichi Takada
2021	The Idolmaster Starlit Season	insert song "Gratitude"
2022	The Idolmaster Cinderella Girls: Starlight Stage	insert song "Junjou Sekkin Story"
2023	Ensemble Stars!	insert song "Angelic Grace"
2025	Once Upon a Katamari	insert song "Katamari Damacy"

=== Other ===
Year	Title	Notes
1997	Onnen Sentai Ressentiment [ja]	live-action film; performance as Emperor Komuro
2006	The Idolmaster Radio	radio show; theme songs "Urgent!!" and "Okey-dokey"
2007	The Idolmaster Radio For You!	Internet radio show; theme song "FO(U)R"
2010	Watashi no Yasashikunai Senpai [ja]	live-action film; opening theme "Maji de Koi suru 5 Byōmae Dai Daisuki"
2018	Mangan [ja]	television drama; background music for episodes 1 and 2
2019	Inakunare, Gunjo [ja]	live-action film; with Kuniyuki Takahashi
