= Yuu Miyake =

Yuu Miyake 三宅 優
- Also known as: eutron Yuusama; U
- Born: November 19, 1973 (age 52); Matsuyama, Ehime Prefecture, Japan
- Genres: Techno; electronic; rock; video game music
- Occupations: Composer; DJ
- Years active: 1997–present

Yuu Miyake (三宅 優, Miyake Yū; born November 19, 1973 in Matsuyama, Ehime Prefecture, Japan) is a Japanese composer and sound engineer who formerly worked at Bandai Namco Entertainment. His most known work surfaced with Katamari Damacy soundtracks, on which he served as a sound director. Other notable works include various tracks in the Tekken and Ridge Racer series.

== Biography ==
As a child, Miyake attended his mother's Electone classes. However, he could not adapt to the pieces he was given to play. He also listened to anime themes, disco and Yellow Magic Orchestra. He later aspired to have a career in illustration, frequently producing drawings. His interest in video game music developed after the release of Haruomi Hosono's Video Game Music, an album featuring music from Namco games he had already enjoyed. He started creating music aged 14, using a PC-88.

Prior to joining Namco in 1997, Miyake was a university student specializing in management information. During the job interview with Namco he was nervous, and initially failed, but was successfully hired after an executive pushed for him to join. His first game with the company was the console version of Tekken 3. Although he was originally only assigned to work on music for the ending movies, Nobuyoshi Sano was impressed and allowed him to work on other music for the game. He was given creative freedom while also following the game's sound direction of big beat music, although he felt pressure to catch up with the music that his seniors, Sano and Keiichi Okabe, were creating. His experience on Tekken 3 led to him working on subsequent titles in the franchise, including Tekken Tag Tournament and Tekken 4. He considers his work on these games to be his "specialty".

In 2000, Miyake worked with Namco director Keita Takahashi on a video project called Texas 2000. While employed at Namco, Miyake was given freedom to provide freelance work spanning various areas, including composition, programming and recording. He composed for promotional videos and commercials, and also provided additional sound design and programming for Mondo Grosso's songs "Everything Needs Love" and "Shinin'", both of which appear on his album Next Wave. He also participated in colleague Hiroshi Okubo's nanosounds circle, contributing tracks to multiple albums between 2000 and 2004.

Takahashi was so impressed with his work on Texas 2000 that he eventually gave him full responsibility as sound director on the 2004 game Katamari Damacy. He was also given extensive trust and creative freedom, and considers the sound design and music to have been a major aspect of the game's success. In addition to covering a wide range of genres, he aimed to write catchy melodies for the game, feeling that video game music since the second half of the 90s had become unmemorable. He also served as the sound director for future titles in the series, and composed for Takahashi's Noby Noby Boy in 2009.

In 2011, he left Bandai Namco and established Miyakeyuu Studio, feeling that he would not grow any further as a musician at the company. He has continued to contribute tracks to further Bandai Namco games, and has also worked on games by other companies, including Super Monkey Ball: Banana Splitz and Gunslinger Stratos. He also started a side project with former Bandai Namco co-worker Yoshihito Yano, named Mikanz. Miyake attended MAGFest 13 in January 2015, holding a QA conference and performing various Katamari Damacy series songs under his DJ handle of "eutron". Yano also attended the event.

Outside of his work in the video game industry, he has worked as a part-time lecturer at Tokyo Polytechnic University since 2014. He tries to ensure that his classes are up-to-date and as fun as possible for students.

== Works ==
=== Video games ===
Year	Title	Notes	Ref
1998	Tekken 3	Music; console version with various others	
1998	Tenkomori Shooting	Sound effects	
1999	Tekken Tag Tournament	Music; arcade version with various others; sound effects	
2000	Tekken Tag Tournament	Music; console version with various others	
2000	Ridge Racer V	Music with various others	
2000	Photo Battle	Music	
2001	Tekken 4	Music; arcade version with Satoru Kōsaki and Akitaka Tohyama	
2002	Tekken 4	Music; console version with various others	
2003	R: Racing Evolution	Music with various others	
2004	Katamari Damacy	Music with various others; sound director	
2004	Tekken 5	Music ("Red Hot Fist" and "Orbital Move"); arcade version	
2004	Ridge Racers	Music ("Pulse Phaze")	
2005	Tekken 5	Music; console version with various others	
2005	We Love Katamari	Music with various others; sound director, chorus ("Katamari Holiday")	
2005	Cobra the Arcade	Voice recording	
2005	Ridge Racer 6	Music ("Acid Eutron #001")	
2005	Me & My Katamari	Music with various others; sound director	
2006	Ridge Racer 7	"Electro Madness"	
2007	Beautiful Katamari	Music ("Guru Guru Gravity" with Tetsuya Uchida and Yoshihito Yano); guitar ("Sayonara Rolling Star"); sound director	
2009	Noby Noby Boy	Music; console version with various others	
2009	Katamari Forever	Music with various others; sound director	
2010	Noby Noby Boy	Music; mobile version with Taku Inoue, Ryo Watanabe and Sexy-Synthesizer	
2011	Touch My Katamari	Music with various others	
2011	Ridge Racer	Music ("Future Driven")	
2012	Super Monkey Ball: Banana Splitz	Music with various others	
2012	Tekken Tag Tournament 2	Music ("The Big One ~Quiet Strings Mix"); console version	
2013	Tekken Revolution	Music ("El Condor")	
2014	Gunslinger Stratos 2	Music ("9Elements")	
2015	Persona 4: Dancing All Night	Arrangement ("Now I Know (Yuu Miyake Remix)")	
2015	Synchronica	Music ("Real-Eyes")	
2016	Tekken 7: Fated Retribution	Music ("Metallic Experience")	
2017	Tekken 7	Music; console version with various others	
2017	CROSS×BEATS	Music ("Phoenix")	
2018	Persona 3: Dancing in Moonlight	Arrangement ("Deep Breath Deep Breath (Yuu Miyake Remix)")	
2024	Tekken 8	Music ("Kakuri-yo Kagura")	
2024	Satoshi Yūgi Ohenro 88	Music; sound effects	
2025	Once Upon a Katamari	Music direction with Shogo Nomura; music with various others	

=== Other ===
Year	Title	Notes
2001	NHK NBA program	Opening music
2002	"Everything Needs Love" / Mondo Grosso ft. BoA	Additional programming
2003	After the Eclipse / Sun Paulo	Recording with Mitsuyoshi Kishida and Toshiyuki Mori
2003	Montuno No. 5 / Qypthone	Remix ("Montuno No. 6"); German version
