= Katamari =

Video game series

- Genre: Third-person puzzle-action
- Developers: Namco; Bandai Namco Studios; Now Production; Genki; Rengame
- Publishers: Namco; Bandai Namco Entertainment
- Creator: Keita Takahashi
- Platforms: PlayStation 2, PlayStation 3, PlayStation 4, PlayStation 5, PlayStation Portable, PlayStation Vita, Nintendo DSi, Nintendo Switch, Nintendo Switch 2, Microsoft Windows, Xbox 360, Xbox One, Xbox Series X/S, macOS, iOS, Android, Windows Phone, tvOS
- First release: Katamari Damacy; 2004
- Latest release: Once Upon a Katamari; 2025

Katamari (Note: Japanese: 塊魂, Hepburn: Katamari Damashī; "Soul of Clumps") is a Japanese video game franchise created by Keita Takahashi and developed and published by Namco (and subsequently Bandai Namco Entertainment). The series puts players in control of a young character called The Prince (also referred to as Dashing Prince or the Prince of All Cosmos) as he assists his father, the King of All Cosmos, in the re-creation of stars and planets by using a ball called a katamari to roll up objects. The first title in the series was Katamari Damacy for the PlayStation 2, which became a cult classic and led to several sequels and spin-offs.

== Concept ==
Keita Takahashi, the series creator, did not go into coding originally. He created "cheerfully bizarre" sculptures when he was a student at Musashino Art University. This inspired Takahashi to entertain audiences with his creations and decided to join Namco as a visual artist. He wanted to create a game where the players can do something they can only do in a game and create something that is not formulaic.

== Gameplay and setting ==
Release timeline
2004	Katamari Damacy
2005	We Love Katamari
2005	Me & My Katamari
2006
2007	Katamari Damacy Mobile
2007	Beautiful Katamari
2008	Rolling With Katamari
2008	I Love Katamari
2009	Korogashi Puzzle Katamari Damacy
2009	Katamari Forever
2010
2011	Katamari Amore
2011	Touch My Katamari
2012
2013
2014
2015
2016	Tap My Katamari
2017	Amazing Katamari Damacy
2018	Katamari Damacy Reroll
2019
2020
2021
2022
2023	We Love Katamari Reroll+ Royal Reverie
2024
2025	Katamari Damacy Rolling Live
2025	Once Upon a Katamari

In most Katamari games, players typically control the player character, The Prince, as he is ordered to do various tasks by his father, the King of All Cosmos.

In Katamari Damacy, The Prince is tasked with the job of rebuilding the stars and constellations that the King destroyed. To do this, the player combines many objects into a singular ball, known as a katamari ball, that could become a star, constellations, or stardust. A katamari ball can roll up certain objects, depending on the Katamari's relative size to them.

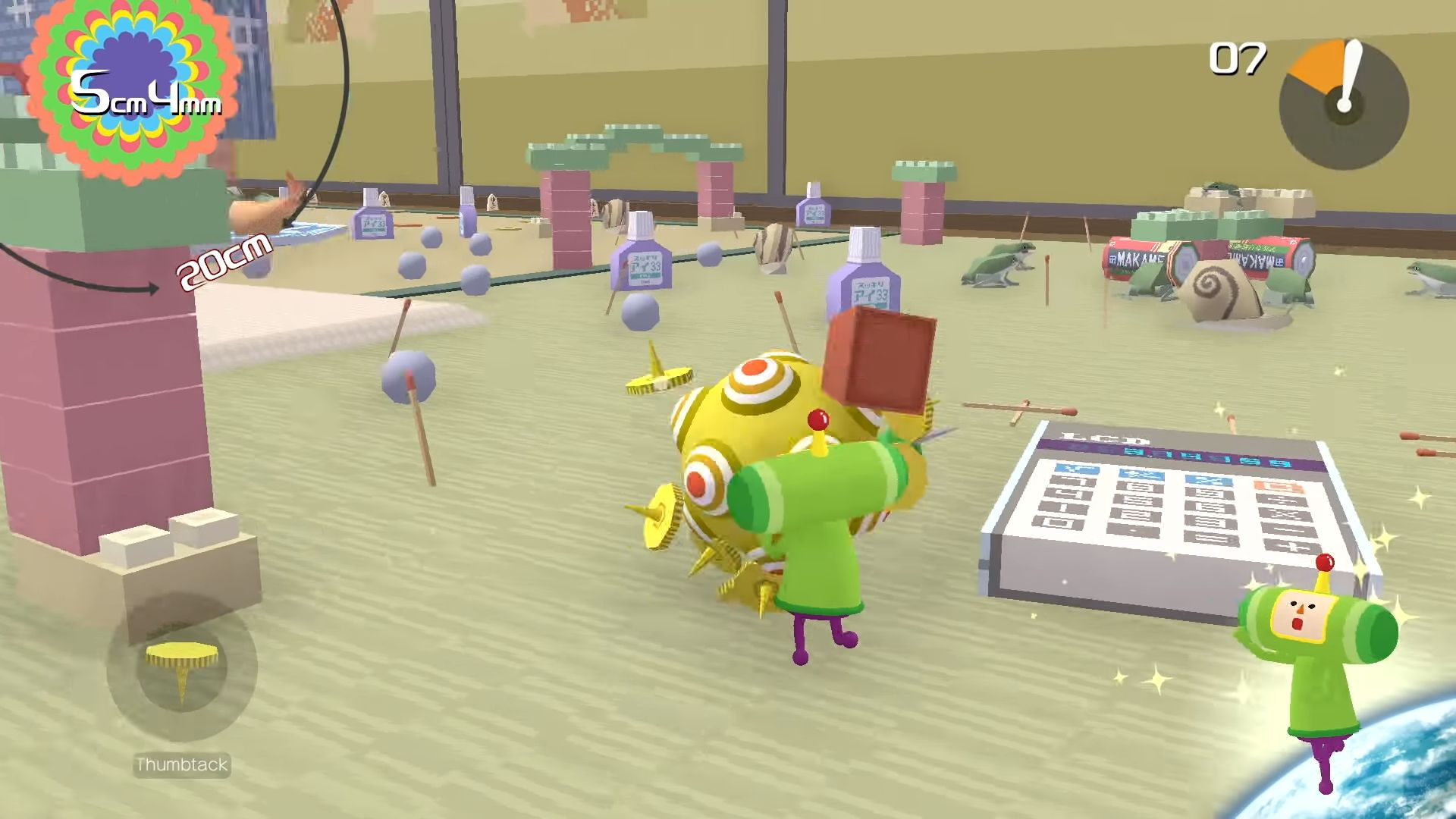
Gameplay screenshot of Katamari Damacy Reroll

Players typically control the katamari ball using two analog sticks; players move forward and backward by pushing the analog sticks in that direction simultaneously. They can turn the katamari by pushing only one stick in the desired direction or pushing the sticks in opposite directions to do so faster (often described as 'tank controls'). Players may also do a 180 degree turn that causes The Prince to jump on the other side of the Katamari typically by pressing the two sticks down into the controller. Players may cause the katamari to roll at high speeds typically by rapidly moving the two sticks in opposite directions back and forth. Players may also cause The Prince to jump and get a better look at the world by pressing L1. Introduced in Katamari Forever, players are given the ability called the "Prince Hop" to make the katamari ball hop.

Before each level, the King will often go on a nonsensical rant to The Prince, and refers to himself using royal we. In Make a Star levels, players are presented with a specific size that the katamari must be before the time limit runs out. As the player rolls up objects using the katamari, it becomes larger, as demonstrated by a size chart on its HUD. In early levels of the game, players are given a katamari similar to the Prince's size, which allows him to only roll up small objects such as tacks and ants. Later levels allow the katamari to grow much larger to the point where it can roll up buildings and clouds. As the katamari becomes larger, the katamari is then able to pick up larger objects. Living and non-living creatures will sometimes attack the katamari if it is smaller than them; once the katamari reaches a certain size, the creature may run away from the large katamari that could pick them up. If the katamari is only barely able to pick a creature up, the player along with the katamari will be knocked away; if the creature is not rolled up in time, the creature will run off and escape. If players are attacked or crash into walls or large objects, the katamari will lose items. If players roll up a long, slender object such as a pencil, the object will sometimes poke outwards out of the katamari and cause the katamari to roll awkwardly until more objects are rolled up. In more recent games, players can hit a glowing pillar that causes all items close to the katamari that are small enough to be sucked into it.

As players reach certain size milestones, the King will appear in the middle of the screen and speak to players. In some levels, this will precede a cutscene alerting players that a new area has opened up. If players fail to reach this size in the time allotted, they are scolded and punished by the King. If players are able to reach the required size before the time limit runs out, they may continue making it bigger. At the end of the stage, players are judged on their size as well as the time it took to reach the required size; if they only barely exceeded the required size, the king criticizes the player and tells them to do better; if they manage to exceed it by a significant enough margin, the king praises the player. If it is the players' first completion of the level, the King will automatically transform it into a star; if it is not, they are asked if they would like to turn it into a star or into stardust. Additionally, if they reach the size fast enough, a shooting star will be unlocked for the star. As an additional reward found in some of the games, players may be allowed to play a specific level without a time limit which allows them to play indefinitely.

Not all levels follow this format; for example, some do not have a timer, and instead require players to do a certain task, such as rolling a snowball to a certain size and putting it on a snowman. Some levels also require players to pick up a specific item, such as in the cow or bear levels where players are tasked with rolling up the largest of that specific animal. Each level is presented on a stage select screen, and can be replayed multiple times after being completed. Each level also typically has two specific objects in them: one of The Prince's many cousins whom, after obtaining, can be used either in multi-player only or in multi-player and single-player, depending on the game. The other is a "Royal Present", which, after obtaining, may be used as an accessory for The Prince or cousins. The games keep record of every item rolled up, and players may view them in a book, which shows specific categories of items and the percentage showing how complete the catalog for each category. Two players may play cooperatively or competitively together; in the cooperative mode, players are tasked with sharing control of the Katamari together with one player controlling one half of controlling the Katamari while another player controls the other in stages that resemble the single-player mode. The competitive mode puts two players against each other as they compete in an arena-like setting to get the largest sized Katamari; if one grows large enough, it can roll up the other player's katamari. Both modes are played with a timer.

== Video games ==
Game	Platform	Release date	Metacritic	GameRankings
Katamari Damacy	PlayStation 2	March 18, 2004	86/100	85.73%
We Love Katamari	PlayStation 2	July 6, 2005	86/100	86.65%
Me & My Katamari	PlayStation Portable	December 22, 2005	75/100	76.31%
Katamari Damacy Mobile	Mobile phones	June 1, 2007	N/A	N/A
Beautiful Katamari	Xbox 360	October 16, 2007	73/100	72.72%
Katamari Damacy-kun	Mobile phones	November 1, 2007	N/A	N/A
Rolling with Katamari	Mobile phones	November 1, 2008	N/A	N/A
I Love Katamari	iOS, Windows Phone, Android	December 14, 2008	80/100	61.25%
Korogashi Puzzle Katamari Damacy	DSiWare	March 25, 2009	N/A	N/A
Katamari Forever	PlayStation 3	July 23, 2009	74/100	77.80%
Oi Katamari Damacy-kun	Mobile phones	October 28, 2009	N/A	N/A
Katamari Amore	iOS	September 29, 2011	63/100	61.00%
Katamari Damacy Mobile+	Android	November 17, 2011	N/A	N/A
Touch My Katamari	PlayStation Vita	December 17, 2011	69/100	70.12%
Katamari Damacy Mobile 2	iOS	March 8, 2012	N/A	N/A
Tap My Katamari	iOS, Android	January 4, 2016	N/A	50.00%
Amazing Katamari Damacy	iOS, Android	December 5, 2017	N/A	60.00%
Katamari Damacy Reroll	Nintendo Switch, Windows	December 7, 2018	87/100 (NS)	N/A
Katamari Damacy Reroll	PlayStation 4, Xbox One, Stadia (Google)	September 7, 2020	N/A	N/A
We Love Katamari Reroll+ Royal Reverie	Nintendo Switch, PlayStation 4, PlayStation 5, Xbox One, Xbox Series X/S, Windows	June 2, 2023	84/100 (NS)	N/A
Katamari Damacy Rolling Live	iOS, macOS, tvOS	April 3, 2025	N/A	N/A
Once Upon A Katamari	Nintendo Switch, Xbox Series X/S, PlayStation 5, Windows, Nintendo Switch 2	October 24, 2025	79	N/A

The first video game released in the series was Katamari Damacy, which was released exclusively for the PlayStation 2 in March 2004, in Japan. Due to the critical and commercial reception that it received, Namco Bandai followed it up with a 2005 sequel also exclusively for the PlayStation 2, titled We Love Katamari. It follows closely in the style of its predecessor, but with new environments and slightly improved physics.

A sequel was made in 2006 exclusively for the PlayStation Portable titled Me & My Katamari, which uses a different scenario and different gameplay which requires players to utilize the D-pad or analog nub and the face buttons in absence of the dual analog sticks used in most Katamari games.

In 2007, the first mobile version of Katamari was released, Katamari Damacy Mobile. The phone game utilizes both tilt controls as well as more traditional controls.

Another sequel, Beautiful Katamari, marked the first major Katamari title to be released for a non-PlayStation console, as well as the first to support high-definition television resolutions of 720p, 1080i, and 1080p. While initially planned for PlayStation 3, Wii and Xbox 360, the former version was canceled.

Katamari Forever, released in 2009 exclusively for PlayStation 3, is mostly a compilation of levels from previous games, with a new story and a few new levels.

Touch My Katamari was released in 2012 exclusively for the PlayStation Vita. Tap My Katamari, a version for mobile devices with iOS or Android, was released in January 2016.

In September 2018 during the Nintendo Direct, Katamari Damacy Reroll is a remake of Katamari Damacy for the Nintendo Switch and PC, released in December 2018, and for PlayStation 4 and Xbox One in November 2020.

In February 2023 during the Nintendo Direct, We Love Katamari Reroll+ Royal Reverie is a remake of We Love Katamari for the Nintendo Switch, PlayStation 4, PlayStation 5, Xbox One, Xbox Series and PC, released in June 2023. In February 2025, Bandai Namco filed a trademark for Once Upon a Katamari. This led to industry speculation over a new entry.

Katamari Damacy Rolling Live was released in April 2025 by Apple Inc. on their Apple Arcade service.

At the Nintendo Partner Direct in July 2025, Once Upon a Katamari was announced for Nintendo Switch, Xbox Series X/S, and PlayStation 5. It was released on October 24, 2025. The Nintendo Switch 2 version of the game was also released October 8, 2026.

== See also ==
- Music of the Katamari Damacy series
