= Beautiful Katamari =

2007 video game

- Developer: Now Production
- Publisher: Namco Bandai Games (Note: Released under the Namco label outside North America.)
- Director: Jun Moriwaki
- Composers: Yoshihito Yano; Tetsuya Uchida
- Series: Katamari
- Engine: Vicarious Visions Alchemy
- Platform: Xbox 360
- Release: NA: October 16, 2007; JP: October 18, 2007; EU: February 29, 2008
- Genres: Puzzle, action
- Modes: Single-player, multiplayer

Beautiful Katamari, released in Japan as Beautiful Katamari Damacy, (Note: Japanese: ビューティフル塊魂, Hepburn: Byūtifuru Katamari Damashii) is an action-puzzle video game developed by Now Production and published by Namco Bandai Games for the Xbox 360. Beautiful Katamari is the fourth game in the Katamari series of games following Katamari Damacy, We Love Katamari, and Me & My Katamari.

== Story ==
The game opens with the King of All Cosmos, his Queen, and the Prince, enjoying some tennis while on vacation, but a powerful serve by the King causes the tennis ball to rip through the fabric of the universe, creating a black hole that sucks everything but the planet Earth into it. In order to correct it, the King commands the Prince to roll up katamaris on Earth to recreate the planets, sun, and other celestial features. Once the Prince completes this, the King then orders him to create a katamari large enough to plug up the black hole and restore order to the universe. The Prince then rolls up enough stuff to create the "Super Giant", a very large Katamari that he then clogs up the black hole with. In the end, the black hole is stopped and the King of All Cosmos takes all the credit for stopping it.

== Gameplay ==
Typical gameplay screenshot

The core gameplay from the Katamari Damacy series is unchanged; the player, as the diminutive Prince, controls a "katamari" to collect objects smaller than the katamari, causing the katamari to grow and collect even larger objects, as to meet various objectives given by the King of All Cosmos. After successfully clearing any level once, the player can then attempt a time attack challenge on that level to make a katamari of a given size in the shortest time possible. Eternal modes, where the player is allowed to roll without any time limits, are available once a perfect score is obtained on a level. The player can also change to another character that the second player also uses- Marcy.

In Beautiful Katamari, players are urged to build katamari with specific types of items. For example, to make the planet Mercury, the King asks the player to collect liquids. After successfully completing the task, the player is rated on time, size, and the number of objects meeting the King's request. Another level requires that the player roll up only hot items and avoid cold items to raise the katamari's temperature to 10,000 degrees Celsius.

Beautiful Katamari is the first game in the series to support high-definition television resolutions of 720p, 1080i and 1080p. Multiplayer modes include 2 player support on the same console and 2-4 player support over Xbox Live in both cooperative and competitive modes. One of the online battle types is a "Thingy Battle", similar to a mode in We Love Katamari, where each player must collect the most of a specific type of item. Game lobbies include simple mini-games.

The game tracks all progress by the player in the various modes and shares this data through Xbox Live to allow the player to compare their performance to others, including on normal request levels, time attacks, and online play performance (tracked as "cookies" awarded by the King). A "worldwide katamari", representing the total size of all objects rolled up by all Xbox Live players and the player's contribution to that, is also available.

== Downloadable content ==
Beautiful Katamari is the first game in the series to include downloadable content. Seven additional levels were available individually from the Xbox Live Marketplace. Each additional level occupied only about 384 kB on the Xbox 360 console's hard drive, leading game reviewer Aaron Linde to complain that the game was shipped feature-complete but crippled unless players paid additional money. One of the Beautiful Katamari achievements explicitly requires that the player "download stages" to be able to build a 1,500,000 km katamari.

Additional downloads were available on the U.S. Xbox Live Marketplace and they immediately unlocked ten cousins or presents. These downloads did not introduce new cousins or presents into the game; they merely worked around the game's need to have the player find these hidden objects.

Downloadable content for the European market was released on May 7, but mistakes were made with the item names, resulting in two items named "Perfectly Sized Katamari" with identical descriptions and only an image to differentiate the two. There were 6 additional levels available for download on EU Xbox Live Marketplace at the time.

== History and development ==
Artist, designer, and creator of the previous Katamari titles, Keita Takahashi, was not involved with Beautiful Katamari, which was directed by Me & My Katamari co-lead game designer Jun Moriwaki.

Early in 2007, various reports suggested that Beautiful Katamari was in development and might be released in North America in Autumn. These reports were based on a United States trademark filing, retailer listings, and a reported announcement by Namco Bandai to retailers.

A demo was distributed in the September 2007 issue of Official Xbox Magazine and on the Xbox Live Marketplace in August. The demo spawned the player in one of several starting points in a single level with a three-minute time limit and an 80 cm katamari. The main menu featured the song "Nananan Katamari". The demo level contained a song called Katamari Dancing by Takashi Utsunomiya which is also the opening song.

Beautiful Katamari was released in October 2007 in North America and Japan, and on February 29, 2008 in Europe.

In 2021, Beautiful Katamari was added to the Xbox One and Xbox Series X and Series S backward compatibility catalog.

=== PlayStation 3 and Wii development ===
During 2007, a post from Orange Lounge Radio in March contained the report that Namco Bandai announced Beautiful Katamari to retailers, which included a release for the Xbox 360, PlayStation 3, and the Wii. According to the post, the PlayStation 3 version of Beautiful Katamari was to feature support for the motion-sensing feature of the Sixaxis Wireless Controller. The post was removed at the request of Namco Bandai.

In mid-April, the game was confirmed by Famitsu to be in development for PlayStation 3 and Xbox 360 in Japan, and officially announced by Namco Bandai Games America that month. Both versions of the game were stated to retain the dual analog control scheme of the PlayStation 2 Katamari games, and also include online play features.

Designer Jun Moriwaki said in April that while a Wii version of Beautiful Katamari was under consideration, difficulties were presented by the system's controller that had to be first resolved.

IGN Nintendo editor-in-chief Matt Casamassina reported in June that according to unnamed sources close to Namco Bandai, the PlayStation 3 edition of Beautiful Katamari was cancelled due to porting issues and stalled PlayStation 3 sales, with resources being redirected towards the development of a Wii version. Namco Bandai was contacted for comment, but a statement was not returned in time for the publishing of the report. Later on July 5, Namco revealed their E3 2007 lineup, listing Beautiful Katamari as Xbox 360 only. On the same day, Famitsu reported that Beautiful Katamari was cancelled for the PS3 and was in development for the Wii and Xbox 360.

The box cover image for the Xbox 360 version, released in late August, indicates that the game is exclusive to the Xbox 360.

In September, Namco-Bandai's U.S. website briefly identified Beautiful Katamari as a title for the Xbox 360, PlayStation 3, and Wii, with the latter two platforms bearing a release date of "TBD". When asked by 1UP.com during the 2007 Tokyo Game Show, Beautiful Katamari director Jun Morikawa claimed specifically that the game will not be available for the PS3, though another Katamari game that stars the King of Cosmos in the lead will make its way to the PS3 "soon". Morikawa also suggested the same for the Wii.

Due to the cancellation of the PlayStation 3 version, Namco later released Katamari Forever, which shares some of its levels with Beautiful Katamari, for that console in 2009.

== Reception ==
Reception

Aggregate scores
Aggregator	Score
GameRankings	72.72%
Metacritic	73/100

Review scores
Publication	Score
Edge	6/10
Electronic Gaming Monthly	5.17/10
Eurogamer	6/10
Game Informer	7.25/10
GamePro	3.75/5
GameRevolution	B+
GameSpot	7.5/10
GameSpy	4/5
GameTrailers	8/10
GameZone	7.7/10
IGN	7.8/10; 7.6/10 (AU)
Official Xbox Magazine (US)	8/10

Beautiful Katamari received "mixed or average reviews", according to review score aggregator Metacritic. Official Xbox Magazine wrote that the game clearly aims at everyone regarding its simplicity, and called it a refreshing contrast to serious titles. IGN gave the game a 7.8 out of 10, calling Beautiful Katamari "a welcome addition to the barren category of family friendly games on 360" but also found fault in the game's short length and the lack of evolution in the Katamari series. Other critics lamented the lack of originality in Beautiful Katamari. Game Informer called the game the "ugly duckling" of the Katamari series, praising the new multiplayer facilities but calling the environments "dull and lifeless". Import-centric UK site NTSC-uk gave it 6/10. The site noted the game's short length and lack of innovation and said that the title would disappoint fans of the series, but might be suitable for newcomers who have never played a game in the series.

As of December 2007, Beautiful Katamari is the 25th best-selling Xbox 360 title in Japan with 24,186 copies sold.
