= Kirinji (band) =

- Origin: Sakado, Saitama, Japan
- Genres: J-pop; indie pop; jazz fusion; adult contemporary
- Years active: 1996–present
- Labels: Natural Foundation (1997); A.K.A. Records (1998-2002); Capitol Music (2003-2004); Triad (2005-2013); Verve Records (2014-present)
- Website: https://www.kirinji-official.com/

Kirinji (キリンジ) is a Japanese band from Sakado, Saitama, originally formed by brothers Takaki and Yasuyuki Horigome in October 1996. The two are also pursuing their own solo efforts.

In April 2013, Yasuyuki left the band to focus on his solo career, ending the first incarnation of the band. In the summer of that year, Takaki took over and continued the band with the addition of five new members under the name "KIRINJI".

On January 31, 2020, Kirinji announced the end of its current band activities. The last live performance "KIRINJI LIVE 2020" of the four-piece band was held on December 9–10, 2020, ending the second incarnation's eight year activity. Kirinji announced its new format will be applied after they finished the tours promoting Cherish. In the new format, the band will be active as a variable music group (solo project), including the past band members, centering on Takaki Horigome.

== Members ==
- Takaki Horigome (堀込 高樹, Horigome Takaki; born June 1, 1969) — Vocals, chorus, and guitar (1996–present)

=== Former members ===
==== First incarnation (1996–2013) ====
- Yasuyuki Horigome (堀込 泰行, Horigome Yasuyuki; born May 2, 1972) — Lead vocals, chorus, and guitar (1996–2013)

==== Second incarnation (2013–2020) ====
- Kotringo (コトリンゴ, Kotoringo; born July 17, 1978) — Vocals, chorus, piano, and keyboards (2013–2017)
- Genichi Tamura (田村 玄一, Tamura Gen'ichi) — Pedal steel guitar, steelpans, guitar, vocals, chorus, and banjo (2013–2020)
- Hitoshi Kusunoki (楠 均, Kusunoki Hitoshi; born October 12, 1958) — Drums, percussion, vocals, and chorus (2013–2020)
- Manabu Chigasaki (千ヶ崎 学, Chigasaki Manabu; born April 25, 1971) — Bass guitar, bass synthesizer, vocals, chorus, and trombone (2013–2020)
- Erino Yumiki (弓木 英梨乃, Yumiki Erino; born August 8, 1990) — Guitar, vocals, chorus, and violin (2013–2020)

== Discography ==
=== Original albums ===
==== First incarnation (1996–2013) ====
- "Paper Driver's Music" (ペイパードライヴァーズミュージック, Peipā Doraivāzu Myūjikku; October 25, 1998)
- "47'45"" (47'45" (ヨンジュウナナテンヨンゴー), Yonjū-nana Ten Yon Gō; July 28, 1999)
- "3" (November 8, 2000)
- "Fine" (November 21, 2001)
- "For Beautiful Human Life" (September 26, 2003)
- "Dodecagon" (October 25, 2006)
- "7 -Seven-" (March 19, 2008)
- "Buoyancy" (September 1, 2010)
- "Super View" (November 7, 2012)
- "Ten" (March 27, 2013)

==== Second incarnation (2013–2020) ====
- "11" (August 7, 2014)
- "Neo" (ネオ; August 3, 2016)
- "Ai o Arudake, Subete" (愛をあるだけ、すべて; June 13, 2018)
- "Cherish" (November 20, 2019)

==== Third incarnation (2020–present) ====
- "Crepuscular" (December 3, 2021 (streaming), December 8, 2021 (CD))
- "Steppin' Out" (September 6, 2023)
- "Town Beat" (January 9, 2026)

=== Other albums ===
- "2 in 1" (March 24, 1999; Independent label)
- "Kirinji RMX" (April 25, 2001)
- "Kirinji RMX II" (April 24, 2002)
- "Omnibus" (November 20, 2002)
- "Kirinji Tour 2003/Live at Budokan" (February 25, 2004)
- "Kirinji Archives Singles Best" (June 23, 2004)
- "2 in 1 ~10th Anniversary Edition~" (March 19, 2008)
- "Kirinji 1998-2008 10th Anniversary Celebration" (December 10, 2008)
- "Songbook ~Connoisseur Series~" (October 19, 2011)
- "Extra-11" (November 11, 2015)
- "Kirinji 20132020" (November 18, 2020)

=== Extended plays ===
- "Sweet Soul EP" (スウィートソウル ep, Suwīto Sōru ep; March 26, 2003)

=== Singles ===
==== First incarnation (1996–2013) ====
- "Kirinji" (キリンジ; May 21, 1997; Independent label)
- "Fuyu no Orca" (冬のオルカ, Fuyu no Oruka; November 1, 1997; Independent label)
- "Futagoza Graffiti" (双子座グラフィティ, Futagoza Gurafiti; August 26, 1998)
- "Oushiza Rhapsody" (牡牛座ラプソディ, Oushiza Rapusodi; June 23, 1999)
- "Arcadia" (アルカディア, Arukadia; January 19, 2000)
- "Good Day Good Bye" (グッデイ・グッバイ, Guddei Gubbai; April 19, 2000)
- "Kimi no Mune ni Dakaretai" (君の胸に抱かれたい; July 12, 2000)
- "Aliens" (エイリアンズ, Eirianzu; October 12, 2000)
- "Ame wa Mōfu no Yō ni" (雨は毛布のように; June 13, 2001)
- "Drifter"/"Taiyō to Venus" (太陽とヴィーナス, Taiyō to Vīnasu) (July 25, 2001)
- "Murasaki * Sunset" (ムラサキ☆サンセット, Murasaki Sansetto; November 7, 2001)
- "Hagane no Uma" (鋼鉄の馬; November 7, 2002)
- "Chameleon Girl" (カメレオンガール, Kamereon Gāru; August 6, 2003)
- "You And Me" (May 12, 2004)
- "Jūyo-ji-sugi no Kagerō" (十四時過ぎのカゲロウ; July 7, 2004)
- "Romantic Kaidō" (ロマンティック街道, Romantikku Kaidō)/"Blue Bird" (ブルーバード, Burū Bādo) (June 21, 2006)
- "Asayake wa Ame no Kizashi" (朝焼けは雨のきざし; February 20, 2008)
- "Natsu no Hikari" (夏の光; July 7, 2010)

==== Second incarnation (2013–2020) ====
- "Manatsu no Saga" (真夏のサーガ, Manatsu no Sāga; July 22, 2015)
- "Jikan ga Nai" (時間がない; May 2, 2018)
- "Killer Tune Kills Me feat. YonYon" (June 5, 2019)

==== Third incarnation (2020–present) ====
- "Hazeru Shinzō feat. Awich" (爆ぜる心臓; July 7, 2021)

=== Digital release singles ===
==== First incarnation (1996–2013) ====
- "Kage no Uta" (影の唄; December 7, 2005)
- "Golden Harvest"/"Lullaby" (September 27, 2006)
- "Kimi no Koto da yo" (君のことだよ; June 25, 2007)
- "Ladybird" (July 25, 2007)
- "Jonathan" (ジョナサン, Jonasan; August 25, 2007)
- "Kyō mo Dareka no Tanjōbi" (今日も誰かの誕生日; September 25, 2007)
- "Tandem Runaway" (タンデム・ラナウェイ, Tandemu Ranawei; October 25, 2007)
- "Greyhound Man (Acoustic Ver.)" (グレイハウンド・マン (Acoustic Ver.), Gureihaundo Man (Acoustic Ver.); November 25, 2007)
- "Ieji" (家路; December 25, 2007)
- "Selene no Serenade" (セレーネのセレナーデ, Serēne no Serenāde; August 5, 2009)
- "Chiisana Otona-tachi" (小さなおとなたち; December 9, 2009)
- "Atarashii Tomodachi" (あたらしい友だち; July 20, 2011)
- "Inore Norō na" (祈れ呪うな; May 30, 2012)
- "Namida ni Akita ra" (涙にあきたら; June 27, 2012)
- "Trekking Song" (October 10, 2012)

==== Second incarnation (2013–2020) ====
- "AI no Tōhikō feat. Charisma.com (AIの逃避行 feat. Charisma.com; November 22, 2017)
- "Almond Eyes feat. Chinza Dopeness (Almond Eyes feat. 鎮座DOPENESS; October 30, 2019)

==== Third incarnation (2020–present) ====
- "Saikai" (再会; April 14, 2021)
- "Hakumei" feat. Maika Loubté (薄明 feat. マイカ・ルブテ; November 19, 2021)
- "Rainy Runaway" (June 22, 2022)
- "Nestling" (April 11, 2023)
- "Honomekashi feat. Se So Neon" (ほのめかし feat. SE SO NEON; July 26, 2023)
- "Runner's High" (August 16, 2023)
- "Sing and Play" (歌とギター, Uta to Gitā; March 19, 2025)
- "Unseen Dancer feat. Tomomi Oda" (October 31, 2025)
- "What a Night" (November 21, 2025)
- "The View from Our Balcony" (December 19, 2025)

== Ties with Namco and other works ==
- Takaki Horigome had worked for Namco for a while during his early days in the band. He composed music for various games. The most notable one is Pac-Attack where he is listed as "Polygome" for the SNES and Sega Genesis Versions and as his regular name in the Namco Anthology 2 updated version for the PlayStation. Some of the music he composed for Namco's games were later repurposed for Kirinji's discography.
  - In Super Famista 4 (スーパーファミスタ4, SNES 1995), the main menu theme has a melody similar to the song "Kanshaku To Iroke" (癇癪と色気) from their second album "47'45"".
  - In Klonoa: Door to Phantomile (Playstation, 1997), the track "Jugpot King Speaks" appears at the end of the song "Amayakana Karada" (甘やかな身体) from their first album Paper Driver's Music.
  - In We Love Katamari (PS2, 2005) Track 7, "Bluffing Damacy", was sung by Yasuyuki and composed by Takaki along with Sakai. Additionally, Track 10 of We Love Katamari, "Houston", was re-arranged by Kirinji for Katamari Forever (PS3, 2009).
  - On December 22, 2017, THE IDOLM@STER MASTER PRIMAL series's third album, POPPIN' YELLOW released in Japan; the third track, "LEMONADE," was composed, arranged, and written by Takaki Horigome/KIRINJI.
- A remixed version of their song "Good Day Good Bye" is featured in Kirinji RMX and Fantastic Plastic Machine's Sound Concierge Annex "Contemporary Love Songs".
