= Katamari Amore =

2011 video game

- App Store art
- Developer: Namco Bandai Games
- Publisher: Namco Bandai Games (Note: Published under the Namco brand.)
- Series: Katamari Damacy
- Platform: iOS
- Release: WW: September 29, 2011
- Genres: Puzzle, action
- Mode: Single-player

Katamari Amore (塊魂 アモーレ, Katamari Amore) was a third-person puzzle-action video game published and developed by Namco Bandai Games for iOS. The game was released to the public on September 29, 2011. Katamari Amore is the second game of the Katamari franchise to be released on iOS, and it featured Game Center integration.

The game's plot revolves around the main character Prince retrieving specific items on the planet Earth for his father the King of All Cosmos.

Katamari Amore was removed from the App Store, along with several other Namco Bandai titles, on March 30, 2015. Most of the game had been accessed through in-app purchases, which became unavailable before then.

== Story ==
The primary story deals with the Prince of All Cosmos adventures on Earth while carrying out missions for his father, known as the King of All Cosmos. One day while cleaning his room, the King finds a book known as "Have a Nice Trip!", which he had gotten while visiting the planet Earth. The book details different rare objects that can be seen around the world. Upon discovering the book, and realizing he is smitten with the beauty of the objects, he orders Prince to Earth to roll them up and bring them back to him.

== Gameplay ==
Gameplay in Katamari Amore

Much of the gameplay is the same as other games in the Katamari series, where the players could control the Prince of All Cosmos who rolls up various items across different levels with a "katamari" in order to increase size. As the katamari's size increased, it was able to roll up more items. Along the way, and depending on the game mode selected by the player, Prince's father, the King of All Cosmos dictated specific challenges that were required to complete.

Multiple control scheme options were available. In the "Acceleration Sensor" scheme, the accelerometer of the gaming device was utilized, and Prince was controlled by physically tilting the device. The "Double Virtual Pad" scheme, where dual virtual sticks were presented on-screen, was the most similar to the traditional style of controls featured in the original Katamari Damacy game. The third control scheme, "Single Virtual Pad", which was chosen by default, was the same as the previous scheme in that it also utilized multi-touch, but only a single virtual stick was displayed on-screen. Regardless of the controls chosen, the option to quickly turn Prince around was achieved by tapping an on-screen button located at the bottom of the display.

Katamari Amore featured several different modes of play. In "Story Mode", the player followed the game's storyline, and had to complete the King's challenges. In "Time Attack Mode", the players had to roll as large a katamari as possible before the time available ran out. In "Exact Size Challenge Mode", the players had to roll the katamari to a specified size, while "Eternal Mode" allowed the player to freely roam the level with an unlimited amount of time to roll the katamari as large as desired. Katamari Amore was initially installed on the device with a single level known as "John's Room" that was available to play in the "Time Attack Mode", while additional levels along with the unlocking of the rest of the game modes were available through in-game purchase of level "packs". "Eternal Mode" was only available for each level after it has been previously beaten.

The game featured specific achievements attainable by players, that integrated with leaderboards on Game Center.

== Development ==
Namco Bandai Games had submitted a trademark application to the European Union's Office for Harmonization in the Internal Market for the name Katamari Amore in 2011. At the time, it was rumored that Namco Bandai would be releasing a new game for the Katamari series, but any other details were unknown to the general public. Namco Bandai officially revealed the game at E3 2011 in June. The company showcased a demo of the game on the E3 show floor that featured a playable first level and the Pac-Man-themed level.

Katamari Amore was released on September 29 of the same year. The game premiered with seven total levels that were available to purchase in a single set from within the game known as the "Have a Nice Trip!" Pack.

After the game's release, on October 27, Namco Bandai released seven additional levels for the game purchasable in a set known as the "Time Trip" Pack.

== Reception ==
Reception

Review scores
Publication	Score
Pocket Gamer	5/10
Slide to Play	3/4
TouchArcade	3/5

Katamari Amore was met with mixed reviews. Andrew Hayward of GamesRadar claimed that despite the game's great performance on the iPad, it suffered in its controls. Chris Schilling of Pocket Gamer wrote that the game created a poor first impression due to Namco's apparent misunderstanding of the freemium pricing model.
