= Katamari Forever =

2009 video game

- North American box art
- Developer: Genki
- Publisher: Namco Bandai Games (Note: Published under the Namco brand outside North America.)
- Director: Kenji Nakano
- Producer: Kazuhito Udetsu
- Designers: Kenichi Mochizuki; Teppei Takeda; Yusuke Kobayashi
- Programmer: Yasuhiro Nomura
- Artist: Taro Uozumi
- Series: Katamari
- Platform: PlayStation 3
- Release: JP: July 23, 2009; EU: September 18, 2009; NA: September 22, 2009; AU: September 24, 2009
- Genres: Puzzle, action
- Modes: Single-player, multiplayer

Katamari Forever, known in Japan as Katamari Damacy Tribute, (Note: Japanese: 塊魂TRIBUTE, Hepburn: Katamari Damashii TRIBUTE) is a video game and the fifth installment of the Katamari series. The game was released for the PlayStation 3 console in Japan on July 23, 2009, and in September for North America, Europe, and Australia.

== Story and gameplay ==
Katamari Forever contains 34 stages, with all but three of the stages being taken from previous titles in the series. Half of the stages take place within the mind of the King of All Cosmos, who gets knocked in the head and has amnesia. The levels are black-and-white in appearance, and the objective is to roll up junk to bring color back to the stages, restoring the King's memory. The other half of the stages take place in the present, where RoboKing, a robotic version of the King of All Cosmos created by the Prince and his cousins, goes on a rampage and destroys all the stars in the sky, which, unlike the King, he feels extremely remorseful for.

The objective of the new levels involves creating stars by rolling up junk as in previous Katamari games. New additions to the gameplay include: the "Prince Hop", which allows the Prince to hop into the air by flicking the controller up or pressing a shoulder button; and the "King Shock", which sucks nearby objects onto the katamari like a magnet.

Katamari Forever lacks the online multiplayer mode as in Beautiful Katamari, but does include local multiplayer and online leaderboards. The game utilizes a full high-definition video format. In addition to graphics in the original style of Katamari Damacy, the game allows the players to select graphic filters such as cel-shaded, colored pencil, or wood grain graphics.

== Music ==
The music for the game includes a number of remixed tracks from previous iterations of the series, using a combination of "electric" and "organic" sounds according to the sound director Yuu Miyake. Miyake employed the help of artists and remixers to help the soundtrack. The soundtrack was released in Japan on August 19, 2009. It includes a total of 36 tracks spanning two discs.

== Reception ==
Reception

Aggregate scores
Aggregator	Score
GameRankings	77.80%
Metacritic	74/100

Review scores
Publication	Score
Destructoid	8/10
Edge	7/10
Eurogamer	7/10
Famitsu	33/40
Game Informer	7.25/10
GamePro	3.5/5
GameSpot	7/10
GameZone	7/10
Giant Bomb	4/5
IGN	7/10
The A.V. Club	B

Katamari Forever was met with positive to average reception upon release. GameRankings gave it a score of 77.80%, while Metacritic gave it 74 out of 100.

The game received a score of 33 out of 40 by Japanese gaming publication Famitsu. It was the 6th best-selling game in Japan during the week of its release, selling 28,000 units. In America, IGN awarded the game 7 out of 10, noting that the game still suffered from many of the issues that plagued past entries in the series. GameSpot also gave it 7 out of 10, commending its gameplay, but thought that the title did not bring anything new to the series. PixlBit awarded the game 4 of 5 stars, recommending the game to both fans of the series and newcomers alike.
