= Once Upon a Katamari =

2025 video game

- Developer: RENGAME
- Publisher: Bandai Namco Entertainment
- Series: Katamari
- Platforms: Nintendo Switch; PlayStation 5; Windows; Xbox Series X/S; Nintendo Switch 2
- Release: October 24, 2025; Nintendo Switch 2 October 8, 2026
- Genres: Puzzle, action
- Modes: Single-player, multiplayer

Once Upon a Katamari (Note: Japanese: ワンス・アポン・ア・塊魂, Hepburn: Wansu Apon A Katamari Damashī) is an action-puzzle game developed by RENGAME and published by Bandai Namco Entertainment. The game is the first original console installment in the Katamari series since Touch My Katamari (2011); it was released on October 24, 2025, for Nintendo Switch, PlayStation 5, Windows, and Xbox Series X/S, with a Nintendo Switch 2 version released on October 8, 2026.

== Plot ==
The King of All Cosmos and his family clean the castle together. While doing so, they stumble upon a strange scroll. Bored after finishing, the King tosses the scroll into the air, destroying the Earth, Moon, and stars. With everything ruined, the King orders his son, the Prince, to clean up the mess. Using the scroll, the Prince time travels to specific dates to restore everything with the Katamari.

== Gameplay ==
As in previous Katamari games, the player controls the minuscule Prince, who must roll around a sticky ball known as a "katamari" to complete various objectives assigned by his father, the King of All Cosmos. Objects smaller than the katamari will stick to it when rolled into, allowing it to grow in size and "roll up" larger objects. Objectives vary from level to level; the player might be tasked to create a katamari of a specific size or to roll as much of a specific object as they can.

Once Upon a Katamari expands on the standard Katamari gameplay with new features. Power-ups are special items that temporarily grant special abilities, such as a radar that shows the location of collectible objects and certain level objectives or a magnet that automatically pulls nearby objects toward the katamari. Crowns, a new type of collectible object, appear in each level and can be rolled up to unlock extra levels.

== Development and release ==
In February 2025, Bandai Namco filed a trademark for Once Upon a Katamari. This led to industry speculation over a new entry. The game was officially announced during a Nintendo Direct on July 31, 2025, and was released on October 24, 2025. A Nintendo Switch 2 version is scheduled for release on October 8, 2026, alongside an update for the Nintendo Switch version adding mouse controls and an improved framerate when played on Switch 2 via backwards compatibility. On the same day, a DLC pack titled Rolling Live Highlights will be released on all platforms, adding new quests, songs, cousins, and accessories based on Katamari Damacy Rolling Live.

== Reception ==
Reception

Aggregate scores
Aggregator	Score
Metacritic	79/100
OpenCritic	83% recommend (Note: Based on 83 reviews)

Review score
Publication	Score
IGN	9/10

The game received "generally favorable" reviews according to the review aggregation website Metacritic.

Charlie Wacholz of IGN praised the game, saying it's "the best the Katamari series has been since the PlayStation 2 era".
