= Katamari Damacy Mobile =

2007 puzzle-action video game published by Bandai Namco Games

- Developer: Namco Bandai Games
- Publisher: Namco Bandai Games
- Platform: Docomo's 904i
- Release: JP: June 2007
- Genres: Puzzle, action
- Mode: Single-player

Katamari Damacy Mobile (塊魂モバイル, Katamari Damashii Mobairu) was a video game developed by Namco Bandai Games for the Mitsubishi P904i series of mobile phones for NTT Docomo. It was released in June 2007 in Japan. It is a spin-off of the Katamari Damacy series, the second game on a handheld game console and the second game produced without the involvement of series creator Keita Takahashi.

This version of the game used a unique method of control, by making use of a new software technology called GestureTek EyeMobile to make phones capable of detecting tilt and vibration via the built in camera on the P904i. The players moved the katamari ball forward, backwards, left and right by tilting the phone.

There were traditional controls as an option to the default motion controls.

Katamari Damacy Mobile came pre-installed on P904i model phones. Other phone models needed to download the game through the Bandai Namco Games channel.

== Gameplay ==
In Katamari Damacy Mobile, the players controlled a highly-adhesive ball called the katamari. The object was to make the katamari as large as possible by running over and collecting objects of increasing size. The more objects players collected, the larger the katamari became. Instead of using analog controllers to control the katamari as in the home console Katamari games, players could roll the katamari by holding a button and tilting the phone in the direction they wanted the katamari to go.

== Reception ==
Many have noted similarities between the 904i series of phones using motion controls similar to the Wii Remote.

Docomo's 904i series, however, calculates tilt based on digital camera images, unlike the Wii and PS3 controllers which use different motion sensing technologies.

An IGN review of EyeMobile-compatible 3D Tilt-a-World warns that this type of motion control fails if the player's movements "are too sudden for the game to translate" and that the setup requires "a well-lit area so the camera can get a good 'fix' on an image".
