= I Love Katamari =

2008 video game

- Appstore icon
- Developer: Namco Bandai Games
- Publisher: Namco Bandai Games
- Series: Katamari Damacy
- Platforms: iOS, Windows Phone 7, Android
- Release: WW: December 14, 2008
- Genres: Puzzle, action
- Mode: Single-player

I Love Katamari (Japanese: 塊魂モバイル, Hepburn: Katamari Damashii Mobairu; lit. "Clump Spirit Mobile") was a third-person puzzle-action video game developed by Namco Bandai Games for iOS. It is a continuation of the Katamari Damacy series of games. It was released worldwide in the App Store on December 14, 2008 (and subsequently removed on March 30, 2015). A Windows Phone 7 version of the game was released in 2010. The version for Android was released in 2012 exclusively for Samsung Android devices. In this game, the King of All Cosmos instructs the game's protagonist – the Prince – to gather as many objects as possible to grow a highly adhesive ball called a Katamari large enough so that he can pick up special objects to bring to the King so that he can regain his memory.

The gameplay was identical to that of Katamari Damacy, where the players could roll a highly adhesive ball called a Katamari, collecting various objects of increasing size until it became large enough to transform into a star. The game utilized the specialized technology from the iPhone and iPod Touch in which players could tilt the device to move the Katamari across the playing field. I Love Katamari received mixed reviews. While it has been praised for its game presentation, it has also been criticized for performance and control issues. The performance and control issues were improved in an update, but not entirely fixed. As of 2018 the game has been delisted from the Apple App Store and Google Play Store, and while it is not available on the Windows Store, the page for it is still active.

== Gameplay ==
Gameplay of I Love Katamari

In I Love Katamari, the players controlled a highly–adhesive ball called the katamari. The object was to make the katamari as large as possible by running over and collecting objects of increasing size. The more objects players collected, the larger the katamari became. Instead of using analog controllers to control the katamari as in the home console Katamari games, players could roll the katamari by tilting the iPhone/iPod Touch in the direction they wanted the katamari to go. The goal was to collect specific objects requested by the King of All Cosmos within a specified time limit.

== Reception ==
Reception

Aggregate scores
Aggregator	Score
GameRankings	61.25%
Metacritic	80/100

Review scores
Publication	Score
IGN	4.5/10
MacLife	2/5
Macworld	n/a
Pocket Gamer	7/10

I Love Katamari has received some praise and some criticism from various reviewers. While some reviewers, such as Nicole Lee from CNET, praised the game for its intuitive usage of the iPhone/iPod Touch technology, other reviewers such as Luke Plunkett from Kotaku and Levi Buchanan from IGN have heavily criticized the game for its lack of responsiveness in controls and handling of the katamari as well as software lag that could cause the game to freeze. Namco Bandai released an update for the game, improving some performance and control problems previously experienced by users.
