= Katamari Damacy Rolling Live =

2025 video game

Katamari Damacy Rolling LIVE
- Developer: Bandai Namco Entertainment
- Publisher: Bandai Namco Entertainment
- Series: Katamari
- Platforms: iOS, iPadOS, macOS, tvOS
- Release: April 3, 2025
- Genres: Puzzle, action
- Mode: Single-player

Katamari Damacy Rolling Live, stylized as Katamari Damacy Rolling LIVE, is an action-puzzle game developed and published by Bandai Namco Entertainment for iOS, iPadOS, macOS, and tvOS. The first main installment in the Katamari series since Touch My Katamari (2011), it was released as an Apple Arcade exclusive on April 3, 2025.

== Gameplay ==
The game retains the core gameplay mechanics of previous entries in the Katamari series, in which players must roll a sticky ball, known as a Katamari, over hundreds of objects, allowing it to grow in size and reach a desired size within a time limit. Rolling Live adds new mechanics based on video game live streaming, where comments from in-game fans appear when the player grows their Katamari. Unlocking new stages is tied to boosting the player's subscriber count and completing challenges from in-game viewers.

== Development ==
Katamari Damacy Rolling Live was announced by Apple Inc. on March 11, 2025 for release on April 3, on Apple Arcade. Developer Bandai Namco Entertainment recommends a controller for the "best experience".

== Reception ==
Writing for Digital Trends, Giovanni Colantonio noted that Rolling Live struggled to iterate on the originality of the first installment, but found it refreshing due to the long break between original entries. He praised the game's progression system, but lamented the awkward touch screen controls and exclusivity to Apple Arcade. Jack Yarwood, writing for Time Extension, also expressed disappointment with Apple Arcade exclusivity.
