= Touch My Katamari =

2011 video game

- Developer: Namco Bandai Games
- Publisher: Namco Bandai Games
- Director: Fumihiro Suzuki
- Series: Katamari
- Platform: PlayStation Vita
- Release: JP: December 17, 2011; WW: February 22, 2012
- Genres: Puzzle, action
- Mode: Single-player

Touch My Katamari, known in Japan as Katamari Damacy No-Vita, (Note: Japanese: 塊魂ノビータ, Hepburn: Katamari Damashii Nobīta) is an action-puzzle video game developed and published by Namco Bandai Games for the PlayStation Vita. An installment in the Katamari series, it was released as a launch game in Japan on December 17, 2011 and in Europe and North America on February 22, 2012. It received mixed reviews from critics, with strong criticism for its constant reuse of assets and levels from previous games and stale nature; it led to a hiatus for the Katamari series (excluding spin-offs for mobile devices and remasters) until 2025.

== Gameplay ==
The game carries on the gameplay of previous Katamari games in which players must roll a sticky ball, known as a Katamari, over hundreds of objects, allowing it to grow in size and reach a desired size within a time limit. This iteration adds new gameplay mechanics that makes use of the PlayStation Vita's features. Along with the analogue controls, players can move their fingers across the touch screen in order to move their Katamari in the desired direction. By moving fingers along the back touch panel, players can squash and stretch their Katamari, stretching it lengthwise in order to roll over more objects or squashing it upwards to fit into tighter areas.

== Plot ==
One day, a boy asks his Dad "Who is more awesome, the King of All Cosmos or his principal?" When the dad is trying to make up his mind, the mom says they are both equally awesome. The king overhears the conversation. Distraught by this, he becomes an utter train-wreck. Somewhere else, a slacker named Goro, who puts off studying for video games, television and the Internet, sees a news broadcast telling of the King's apparent depression. Goro believes that this is his moment to start his life anew, so he starts to make a new lifestyle for himself.

== Reception ==
Reception

Aggregate score
Aggregator	Score
Metacritic	69/100

Review scores
Publication	Score
The A.V. Club	B
Destructoid	7.5/10
Electronic Gaming Monthly	6/10
Eurogamer	6/10
Famitsu	32/40
Game Informer	7.5/10
GameSpot	7/10
GameTrailers	7.8/10
Giant Bomb	3/5
IGN	6/10
Pocket Gamer	3.5/5
Polygon	5/10
PlayStation: The Official Magazine	8/10
Push Square	6/10
The Digital Fix	6/10

The game received "average" reviews according to the review aggregation website Metacritic. In Japan, Famitsu gave it a score of one eight, one seven, one nine, and one eight for a total of 32 out of 40.

Media Create reports did not have the game in the top 50 selling games in the week after its debut. On PlayStation LifeStyle, Heath Hindman's review claimed the game was better for series newcomers than veterans, because longtime fans were likely to find the recycled stages somewhat stale. In a hands-on preview, 1Up.com's Jeremy Parish had similar comments, saying that the series now "continues to miss the point".
