= Me & My Katamari =

2005 video game

- Developer: Namco
- Publishers: JP: Namco; NA: Namco Bandai Games (Note: Released under the Namco label); PAL: Electronic Arts
- Directors: Shuhei Kurose; Yutaka Yoshida
- Producer: Toshiya Hara
- Designers: Jun Moriwaki; Taisuke Ishida
- Programmer: Naoki Takishita
- Composers: Yuu Miyake; Akitaka Tohyama; Hideki Tobeta; Yoshihito Yano; Yuri Misumi
- Series: Katamari
- Platform: PlayStation Portable
- Release: JP: December 22, 2005; NA: March 21, 2006; EU: May 12, 2006
- Genres: Puzzle, action
- Modes: Single-player, multiplayer

Me & My Katamari (Note: Known in Japan as Boku no Watashi no Katamari Damacy (僕の私の塊魂, Boku no Watashi no Katamari Damashii).) is a 2005 action-puzzle video game developed and published by Namco for the PlayStation Portable. It is the third game in the Katamari series, the first game on a portable system and the first game produced without the involvement of series creator Keita Takahashi. It is also the last Katamari game to be published by Namco as an independent company, which merged with Bandai after its release to form Namco Bandai Games in 2006.

== Gameplay ==
Screenshot from the game

Gameplay is much like that of the previous Katamari titles. Controls differ from those of the PS2 games given that the PSP lacks the DualShock 2 dual analog sticks. The player uses the D-pad and the four face buttons to imitate the analog controls. In the North American release, there is the ability to use the thumb-nub instead of the D-pad; the original Japanese version only uses the thumb-nub to move the camera. The L and R buttons are used for tight turns.

The Sunflower Continent is the main level in the game. For variety, the time of day and season constantly change during different missions. There are five stages of the game, rising up to the World where the katamari can reach over 4 km (2.48 mi) . In the multiplayer mode, each player owns and names their own island. A maximum of three of the player's friends can visit the island, via ad hoc network. The visitor can challenge the player in a contest of rolling the most valuables, like the Saving Red Panda stage in We Love Katamari.

== Story ==
The King of All Cosmos and the Royal Family decide to take some time off from their celestial construction and travel to Earth for a well-earned (for the Prince at least) tropical summer vacation on their own sunny island. The King's over-exuberance, however, creates a tsunami that strikes and devastates nearby Paradise Commonwealth Island. One of the residents, a turtle, washes ashore next to the Royal Family and tells them his tale. The King then decides to make new islands for the animals of the Commonwealth with several katamari. Similar to the previous Katamari titles, the King sends the Prince to the Sunflower Continent, which is full of the paraphernalia used to create new landmasses.

== Reception ==
Reception

Aggregate scores
Aggregator	Score
GameRankings	76.31%
Metacritic	75/100

Review scores
Publication	Score
Edge	7/10
Electronic Gaming Monthly	6.5/10
Eurogamer	6/10
Famitsu	33/40
Game Informer	8/10
GamePro	3.5/5
GameSpot	8/10
GameSpy	3.5/5
GameTrailers	7.4/10
GameZone	8.1/10
IGN	7.6/10
Official U.S. PlayStation Magazine	4/5
Entertainment Weekly	B+
The Sydney Morning Herald	4/5

Me & My Katamari was met with positive reception upon release. GameRankings gave it a score of 76.31%, while Metacritic gave it 75 out of 100. By the end of 2006, the game had sold over 82,000 copies in Japan. The colourful graphics, dialogue and soundtrack were primarily praised.
