= We Love Katamari =

2005 video game

- North American box art
- Developer: Namco (Note: Remaster developed by Monkey Craft.)
- Publishers: JP: Namco (Note: Remaster published by Bandai Namco Entertainment.); NA: Namco Hometek; PAL: Electronic Arts
- Director: Keita Takahashi
- Producers: Toshiya Hara; Hideki Tomida
- Designers: Masatoshi Ogita; Takako Maeda; Akihiro Takano; Kazunori Okanaka
- Artist: Takeshi Ugajin
- Composers: Yuu Miyake; Yuri Misumi; Hiroshi Okubo; Masashi Sugiyama; Katsuro Tajima; Akitaka Toyama; Yoshihito Yano
- Series: Katamari
- Platforms: PlayStation 2; Reroll+ Royal Reverie; Nintendo Switch, PlayStation 4, PlayStation 5, Windows, Xbox One, Xbox Series X/S
- Release: July 7, 2005: PlayStation 2; JP: July 7, 2005; NA: September 20, 2005; PAL: February 3, 2006; Reroll+ Royal Reverie; WW: June 2, 2023
- Genres: Puzzle, action
- Modes: Single-player, multiplayer

We Love Katamari (Note: Stylized as We ♥️ Katamari. Known in Japan as Minna Daisuki Katamari Damacy (みんな大好き塊魂, Minna Daisuki Katamari Damashii; Everyone Loves Katamari Damacy).) is a 2005 action-puzzle video game developed and published by Namco for the PlayStation 2. It is the sequel to the 2004 sleeper hit Katamari Damacy. The player controls a diminutive character named the Prince as he rolls around an adhesive ball called a "katamari" to collect increasingly larger objects, ranging from coins to pencils to buildings, in order to build stars as ordered by his father, the King of All Cosmos.

Katamari Damacy creator Keita Takahashi opposed the idea of a sequel as he believed the video game industry's focus on sequels was detrimental to employee creativity. He agreed to direct We Love Katamari when Namco executives stated they would continue development with or without his input. The game was given a larger budget and staff compared to the original, with Takahashi leading a team of 30 employees to create it. We Love Katamari is themed around fan service as a response to the significant support from fans for Katamari Damacy. Takahashi mandated that it needed to retain the spirit of its predecessor while also feeling new and fresh at the same time.

Critics enjoyed We Love Katamari for keeping the style of Katamari Damacy intact, such as its unique gameplay, heavily-stylized visuals, and soundtrack. Its new additions, such as multiplayer modes and additional level objectives, were also met with praise. Some believed the game did not feel like the creative leap of the original, and its new ideas did not change much overall. It was the only other Katamari game to have involvement from Takahashi, and was followed by Me & My Katamari later that year.

A remaster, We Love Katamari Reroll+ Royal Reverie, was released in June 2023 by Namco's successor Bandai Namco Entertainment for Nintendo Switch, PlayStation 4, PlayStation 5, Windows, Xbox One and Xbox Series X/S.

== Gameplay ==
The Prince rolling his katamari through a city.

In We Love Katamari, the player controls the Prince, the 5-centimeter-tall son of the god-like entity the King of All Cosmos, who rolls around a "katamari", a magical ball that causes objects smaller than it to attach to it. The player moves the Prince throughout each level, collecting objects in order to fulfill objectives set by his father. Collecting a certain number of objects causes the katamari to grow in size, allowing it to pick up larger objects that couldn't be rolled up earlier. Objects range from household objects like coins, pencils, and dice, to larger ones like buildings, mountains, and clouds. If the katamari collides with a moving object or a wall, objects attached to the katamari will fall off and decrease its size. Rolling against a wall allows the player katamari to "climb" it in order to reach higher areas.

We Love Katamari differs from its predecessor in its level design. The standard game mode is "Make A Star", where the katamari must grow to a specific size as determined by the King. New game modes include making the katamari as big as possible with a limited number of objects, rolling up snow to create the head of a snowman, collecting children and delivering them to a school, and using a sumo wrestler to roll over food items to gain body mass. Completing missions unlocks an alternative version of the level that features a new objective. In most missions, players can find a cousin of the Prince which, when rolled up, can be selected as a playable character. There are also items known as "royal presents" that unlock clothing that the Prince and his cousins can wear. A cooperative two-player mode is available, where each player controls half of the katamari and must work together to roll up objects, as well as a "Battle" mode where players compete against each other to roll up more objects than their opponent.

== Plot ==
The first story in the game is a self-referential story of how the King of All Cosmos is reacting to the unexpected success of Katamari Damacy. After completing his goal to recreate the stars in the sky, the King of All Cosmos was surprised to discover that he had many fans down on Earth. King of All Cosmos seeks to help fulfill the wishes of his fans, with the help of his son and his son's cousins, who again travel Earth, rolling things into a Katamari.

The second story tells the life of the King of All Cosmos before becoming King. His father always pushed his son to go further and punished the future King whenever he failed a task. In his early life, he was a boxer. After losing first place in a boxing tournament, the Emperor throws his son's second-place trophy into the river out of disappointment. At some undisclosed time, after an argument concerning a strawberry shortcake, the future King runs away from home and gets into fights with street punks who in one altercation slice off the front of his pompadour haircut. The dejected future king bumps into a woman and they fall in love at first sight.

The future King's father lectures. In frustration and anger, the son lashes out, knocking his father to the ground. The king walks away without any further dispute, confusing the future king. Later that evening, the future king spies his father deep in thought, staring at the second-place boxing trophy. Recalling the incident from his childhood, and imagining his father fishing the trophy back out of the river, he realizes the love underlying his father's stern exterior all these years. He bursts into the room, crying, and kneels before his father to beg forgiveness. The father places a hand on his son's head and supports the future King's relationship with his future wife. After this reconciliation, all is well between the Emperor, the son, and his fiancée, but soon afterward, the Emperor falls ill. The Emperor crowns his son as the new King of All Cosmos and collapses shortly after.

At a later undisclosed time, the King is now a grown man, pacing back and forth in a waiting room. Suddenly, he hears the sound of a baby crying in the delivery room, as he rushes to investigate, and a nurse appears from a doorway to call him. Later, the King and the Queen are then shown happily looking down at their son, the Prince of All Cosmos, newly born and wrapped in a blanket, the character that the player controls during the game.

== Development ==
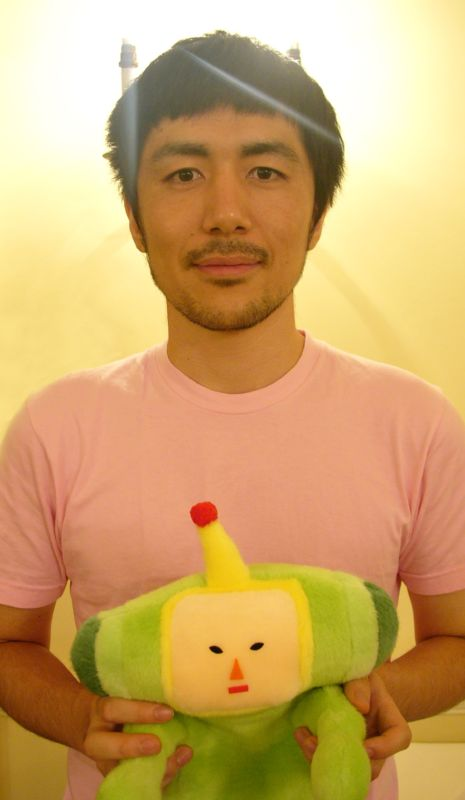
Katamari creator Keita Takahashi in 2005

Namco announced We Love Katamari in April 2005 and was demonstrated at that year's Electronic Entertainment Expo (E3), where it gained favorable reception from attendees. Keita Takahashi opposed the idea of creating a sequel to Katamari Damacy, as it was his belief the industry relied heavily on sequels that limited creativity and what developers could implement into their games. Namco already began work on a follow-up to Katamari in the form of a Christmas-themed version of the original, without involvement from Takahashi. When he discovered the project's existence, executives stated development of the sequel would continue with or without his input. In response, Takahashi agreed to direct the sequel, tentatively titled Katamari Damacy 2.

Takahashi chose to theme the sequel around supplying fan service as a response to the significant support from fans for the original Katamari Damacy. This stemmed from Takahashi's gripe towards defining games with traditional methods, such as displaying product descriptions on the front of its cover art. The development team chose to name the sequel We Love Katamari in reference to this concept, as well as the level structure focusing around taking requests from fictional fans. Takahashi noted that such concepts would have been impossible to implement in Katamari Damacy due to it being an original project. We Love Katamari was designed at a larger scale compared to the first game, and possessed a larger development team of 30 people. Takahashi mandated that it had to keep the spirit of Katamari Damacy while feeling new at the same time.

Like the first game, We Love Katamari rarely attempts realism, focusing heavily on characters and environments that are heavily stylized and bizarre in nature. This absurdity carried over to the story, which Takahashi wrote as being a self-referential story about the characters knowing and talking about them being in a game. The multiplayer modes were originally created for Katamari Damacy, but had to be cut due to time constraints. Takahashi and the development staff created these modes as it encouraged teamwork and gave players a sense of accomplishment.

== Release ==
The game was released in Japan on July 7, 2005 as Minna Daisuki Katamari Damacy (Everyone Loves Katamari Damacy); its cover art, featuring the development team cheering outside Namco's head office in Yaguchi, Ōta, was created to further emphasize its centering around fanservice. It was released in North America on September 20, 2005, and in Europe on February 2, 2006; the European release was published by Electronic Arts. Namco Bandai Games re-released the game in Japan on June 8, 2006 under the PlayStation 2 The Best budget title line.

Developed by Monkeycraft, a remaster of We Love Katamari, titled We Love Katamari Reroll+ Royal Reverie, was released on Nintendo Switch, PlayStation 4 and 5, Windows, Xbox One and Series X/S, on June 2, 2023. The remaster supports high-definition resolutions and other quality of life improvements.

== Reception ==
Reception

Aggregate score
Aggregator	Score
Metacritic	86/100

Review scores
Publication	Score
Eurogamer	9/10
Famitsu	34/40
Game Informer	8.5/10
GamePro	4/5
GameSpot	8.4/10
GameSpy	4/5
IGN	8/10
Official U.S. PlayStation Magazine	4.5/5
X-Play	4/5
The Sydney Morning Herald	5/5

We Love Katamari Reroll+ Royal Reverie

Aggregate score
Aggregator	Score
Metacritic	(PS5) 81/100 (NS) 83/100

Review scores
Publication	Score
Destructoid	8/10
Hardcore Gamer	4/5
Push Square	8/10

We Love Katamari was met with positive reception upon release. Metacritic, which uses a weighted average, gave it an aggregate score of 86 out of 100, indicating "generally favorable" reviews. It sold over 116,000 copies in Japan by the end of 2005. The Sydney Morning Herald praised the game, stating that "the way the scale changes seamlessly is incredibly cunning with areas becoming accessible and later off-limits again according to the size of your flotsam-encrusted orb". The Times gave it a favorable review and stated that "what's most important about We Love Katamari is that it represents a move in which Electronic Arts, the world's biggest games publisher, has been prepared to release a title that is new, entertaining, and ultimately original".

Both GamePro and Game Informer praised the co-op mode introduced into the game, noting that it took some getting used to, but that the game was just as polished and fun as the single-player mode. GameSpot also noted that the co-op can take some getting used to, but can be a great acquired taste. IGN on the contrary, was more critical regarding co-op and stated that it did not work well at all.

The music was also received positively among critics. Game Informer noted that the music was just as artsy as its predecessor and found dogs barking the theme song brilliant. GameSpy had similar comments stating that the music was just as cool as its predecessor but with more production values implemented into it. They further appreciated the ability to select their preferred song. Eurogamer thought the music was better than its predecessor and noted that songs previously introduced being re-recorded with a wider range of vocals and the addition of classical pieces GameSpot noted that unlike its predecessor, the music of the game is less focused on catchiness and moves into a more experimental direction. X-Play found it to be one of the best out there although considered it to be inferior to its predecessor.

Although the game was received positively overall, some reviews critique specific aspects of the game. Eurogamer noted at the mechanics aren't perfect, criticizing the imbalance in difficulty between levels. IGN was critical of the gameplay and stated it wasn't as appealing as the first game. IGN further elaborated that they expected more creative changes to the gameplay. GameSpot criticized the versus mode for having only three stages, making it have little replay value. X-Play noted that the game did not offer enough advancements from its predecessor.

During the 9th Annual Interactive Achievement Awards, We Love Katamari was awarded "Children's Game of the Year" by the Academy of Interactive Arts & Sciences.

According to Metacritic, We Love Katamari Reroll+ Royal Reverie received "generally favorable reviews".
