= King of All Cosmos =

Video game character

- Katamari character
- The King of All Cosmos as he appears in Katamari Damacy Reroll
- First appearance: Katamari Damacy (2004)
- Created by: Keita Takahashi

In-universe information
- Spouse: The Queen of All Cosmos
- Children: The Prince (son)

The King of All Cosmos (Japanese: 大コスモの王様, Dai kosumo no ōsama) is a character from the Katamari video game series. Created by video game developer Keita Takahashi, he first appears in the 2004 video game Katamari Damacy and is presented as a colossal-sized, god-like monarch who rules over the cosmos, which encompasses all the stars and planets in the sky. In the Katamari series, the King of All Cosmos instructs the franchise's player character, the Prince, to collect and roll up assortments of objects using a ball called a katamari until they are large enough to become celestial bodies. The character has had recurring appearances in the Katamari video game series as a major supporting character, as well as a number of crossover appearances. The King of All Cosmos is generally well received by critics and players.

== Concept and design ==
The King of All Cosmos was created by Keita Takahashi for the Katamari franchise's first game, Katamari Damacy. The character's hammer-shaped head, like that of other recurring series characters, is derived from unused design work by Takahashi for a cancelled game called Action Drive, where the hammer heads are meant to stun human targets who are driving by, and steering wheels would be attached to the top of the humans' heads after they have been hacked. Takahashi decided to repurpose the visual element for Katamari Damacy after production on Action Drive was discontinued. Takahashi based the character's face and flamboyant personality on British musician Freddie Mercury, and his body is modeled after that of the Japanese ballet dancer Tetsuya Kumakawa.

The King of All Cosmos is portrayed as an aloof and capricious being who constantly berates his son, the Prince, and belittles his efforts to cultivate the katamari ball which somehow falls short of his standards. He is depicted as being constantly perplexed, surprised or infatuated with the boundless limits of human creativity as expressed by the various objects that can be found on Earth. He is depicted as capable of speaking numerous languages, including Esperanto, and uses the royal we as part of his speech pattern. Prior to the beginning of each level, he provides a summary of mission objectives to the player character as well as brief descriptions for a variety of subjects like countries, geographical features, and living creatures. His voice is conveyed entirely through record scratches of various tempos: a slow tempo indicates disapproval or deep thoughts, whereas the opposite conveys urgency and excitement. His comments to the Prince are never overtly cruel, but instead passive aggressive by nature and always convey the impression that the Prince is an endless source of disappointment for him. Later games maintain the character's imposing flamboyance and provide more insight into an increasingly odd backstory.

The King's obsession with the notion that an amalgamation of little things makes up for big mistakes reflects the style of humour used in the Katamari series. For Takahashi, the clear subtext behind the narrative of the Katamari series is about the mass consumption and excess of non-essential products in modern culture; the humorous elements of his games are deliberately used as a "sugar coating" for the "deep and extreme" messages his works may attempt to convey, as he did not intend for players to be fully aware of the subtext.

== Appearances ==
In Katamari Damacy, the King wakes up one day to find that he has accidentally destroyed all the stars in the cosmos after a night of drunken revelry. The only speaking character in the original game, he directed his son, the Prince, and his son's cousins to roll up any and all objects on Earth so that they could be turned into stars and repair the damage caused by the incident. We Love Katamari gives further insight into the life of the King of All Cosmos prior to the events of Katamari Damacy. During this game, the King of All Cosmos seeks to fulfill the desires of the fans on Earth that he gained during the events of Katamari Damacy, again through directing his son, the Prince, and his cousins to complete each task. In Me and My Katamari, the royal family takes a vacation. While playing in the ocean, the King accidentally causes a tsunami and wipes out all of the animal inhabited islands in the sea. He shortly sends out the Prince to clean up after him. Outside of the Katamari series, he was featured as an unlockable character for the mobile game Crossy Road in an October 2016 update.

A Katamari webcomic, which follows the King of All Cosmos and his son, was published on ShiftyLook.com as of September 17, 2012. Alongside visual references to the various elements of Keita Takahashi's body of fictional work, the King of All Cosmos is featured on the cover of the second issue of independent game magazine A Profound Waste of Time, a joint collaborative effort by Takahashi, illustrator Doug John Miller and editor Caspian Whistler.

== Promotion and reception ==
To promote the then-upcoming release of We Love Katamari, a website which focused on the King and his eccentric mannerisms was launched in September 2005. Amazon.com included the King of All Cosmos among various notable characters with prominent moustaches to promote awareness for Movember for the month of November 2012. The cover art for the vinyl release of the soundtrack for Katamari Damacy, promoted by Mondo, illustrates the King of All Cosmos and the Prince in poses reminiscent of Michelangelo's seminal fresco painting The Creation of Adam.

Lucas Sullivan from GamesRadar considered the King to be the prototype for GLaDOS from the Portal series: an "ominous, eminently quotable" foil of the silent protagonist who comes across as an appealing character, despite his constantly berating of the protagonist. Commenting on the character's significant following, Roger Altizer Jr. described the King of All Cosmos as an aesthetically unique character who has captured the imagination of video game enthusiasts around the world with his charming antics as well as a backstory that includes abuse, power and mistakes. In his analysis of the character for the 2017 publication 100 Greatest Video Game Character, Altizer Jr. drew attention to the similarities between the character's capricious behavior and the real world mythological stories about the Greek gods, as well as the "cycle of dysfunction" with regards to the King's relationship with his own father as a child, and how his past experiences influences his relationship with his progeny. Allegra Frank from Polygon lauded the King of All Cosmos as an "all-time great character" and attributed the series' deliriously funny moments to its often sharp writing. To Chris Shive from Hardcore Gamer, "the King of All Cosmos has some of the best quotes of any video game character" due to their often random and nonsensical content which adds to the character's charm, and that he is a good source of motivation for the player to improve their katamari score. Alan Wen from Rock, Paper, Shotgun concurred, opining that failure to please the King is an important part of how a player would come to enjoy the game, and that the emotional payoff comes after the player finally manages to elicit genuine praise from the character. Reflecting on the absurdity surrounding the conceit of pleasing the King's monomaniacal whims, Brendan Main observed that the Katamari series exposes the arbitrary nature inherent in video games, parodying the importance and value society attaches to "inane projects" as well as how beholden individuals are to the goals and rules that bind them.

The King of All Cosmos have been featured in several "top" character lists. In a 2007 article published by Destructoid, Colette Bennett described the King as a character she "love to hate" due to his egocentric nature and mistreatment of his son, the player character. In their December 2010 issue, Game Informer ranked the King of All Cosmos #30 in their "Top 30 Characters Who Defined A Decade" list. Naming the King of All Cosmos in his list of the 10 best video-game characters, Tom Chatfield from The Guardian noted that the character is among the oddest aspects of a "bonkers game concept" and that the character's "uniquely deformed syntax" has earned him a dedicated fan following. The character has appeared on multiple character lists compiled by GamesRadar staff, which measures his significance and physical attractiveness among the notable video game characters of the 2000s decade, and as an essential component of one of the most ludicrous storylines in video games.

Shive discussed the King's eccentric behavior and unusual dress sense at length in a retrospective editorial, highlighting in particular the character's bulging crotch as a result of his tightly fitting costume and how later sequels has him wearing less revealing pants. In an article published by Wired, Lore Sjöberg discussed the King's "disturbing" look in his criticism of the perceived hypocrisy behind Fox News' promotional efforts surrounding the engineered controversy over allegations of obscenity in the 2007 video game Mass Effect.

The King of All Cosmos has been the subject of creative activities engaged by video game enthusiasts, such as fan-produced videos, shoe art, and unofficial merchandise. The character was referenced in an episode of Once Upon a Pixel, a web series about video game characters by Anthony and Ashly Burch. Titled Death Ball, the episode is presented in a dark, graphic novel style and the King interpreted as a thoroughly malevolent character with regards to his abusive behaviour towards his family.
