= God Turn Me into a Flower =

2022 song by Weyes Blood

Single by Weyes Blood

from the album And in the Darkness, Hearts Aglow
- Released: November 16, 2022
- Genre: New-age
- Length: 6:26
- Label: Sub Pop
- Songwriter: Natalie Mering
- Producers: Natalie Mering; Jonathan Rado

Weyes Blood singles chronology
"Grapevine" (2022)	"God Turn Me into a Flower" (2022)	"Children of the Empire" (2023)

Music video
- "God Turn Me into a Flower" on YouTube

"God Turn Me into a Flower" is a song by American singer-songwriter Weyes Blood. Written and produced by the artist, along with Jonathan Rado, the song was released on November 16, 2022, as the third single from her fifth studio album, titled And in the Darkness, Hearts Aglow (2022). The artist included "God Turn Me into a Flower" in the set list of her In Holy Flux Tour.

== Theme ==
The new-age track, finds the artist "both lamenting and exalting her softness, wishing to be turned into a flower so as to express her true form without being crushed down by life".

According to NME, the song reworks the Greek myth of Narcissus, a "hunter who becomes obsessed with his own reflection". "I'd been trying to figure out what exactly was the crux of why everything felt so selfish and strange," said Weyes Blood. She added: "Colloquially, it’s become this idea that he was obsessed with himself, that he saw himself and was just obsessed with it. But the real crux of it is that he didn’t recognise himself. He was obsessed with the reflection, but he didn’t realise it was just him."

== Promotion ==
Weyes Blood performed "God Turn Me into a Flower" in The Late Show with Stephen Colbert on March 30, 2023, where she "gave the emotive track an ethereal vibe complete with beams of sunlight". A music video for the song, directed by Adam Curtis, was released on October 19, 2023. The director, who the singer first met during a trip to London, also provided visuals for her concert tour.

== Personnel ==
Credits adapted from the liner notes of And in the Darkness, Hearts Aglow.

- Natalie Mering – vocals, synthesiser, organ, production
- Ben Babbitt – cello arrangement
- Cornella Babbitt – cello
- Charlie Bisharat – electric violin
- Daniel Lopatin – synthesiser
- Jonathan Rado – production
- Ben Babbitt – additional production
- Sean Cook – engineering
- Sarah Tudzin – additional engineering
