= In Holy Flux Tour =

2022–2023 concert tour by Weyes Blood

- Tour by Weyes Blood
- Promotional poster for the Australian leg
- Location: North America; Europe; Oceania
- Associated album: And in the Darkness, Hearts Aglow
- Start date: December 8, 2022
- End date: November 29, 2023
- No. of shows: 103
- Supporting acts: Molly Lewis; Vagabon; Sam Burton; Jack Ladder; Lost Animal; Nicholas Allbrook

Weyes Blood concert chronology
- Something to Believe Tour (2019); In Holy Flux Tour (2022–2023)

The In Holy Flux Tour was the second headlining concert tour by American singer-songwriter and musician Weyes Blood, in support of her fifth studio album, And in the Darkness, Hearts Aglow (2022). She also debuted songs from Titanic Rising (2019). The tour consisted of four legs throughout North America, Europe, and Oceania; it started on December 8, 2022, in Los Angeles, United States, and concluded on November 29, 2023, in Mexico City.

== Background ==
Weyes Blood's fifth studio album, titled And in the Darkness, Hearts Aglow, was announced on social media on September 12, 2022; in parallel, she released its lead single, "It's Not Just Me, It's Everybody", and also announced that she would embark on her second concert tour, In Holy Flux Tour. She revealed the tour dates, locations, and venues for 29 shows in North America and 14 shows in Europe. On January 26, 2023, the artist confirmed that American singer Sam Burton would be the special guest for the European leg.

On March 6, 2023, Weyes Blood announced the third and fourth leg of the concert tour, subtitled "Unleashed" and "the Resurrection", respectively. In selected dates of the former, she was an opening act for American musician Beck and French band Phoenix, as part of their co-headlining Summer Odyssey Tour. In April 2023, she announced the "New Dawn" leg of the In Holy Flux Tour, which would be embarking in New Zealand and Australia. Jack Ladder, Lost Animal, and Nicholas Allbrook served as opening acts. A visual collage directed by photographer Neelam Khan Vela with scenes of the tour was released as the music video for the track "Hearts Aglow" on August 9, 2023.

== Critical reception ==
The show in Boise, Idaho, on March 19, 2023, was described by Flood Magazine's Kurt Orzeck as "even more unforgettable" than And in the Darkness, Hearts Aglow, while adding the show in the list of the 100 Best Rock Live Performances of the year. Bill Pearis for BrooklynVegan described the concert tour's production as "genuinely dazzling", and marked "Movies" as one of the night's highlights.

== Set list ==
This set list is representative of the show on March 3, 2023, in Brooklyn. It does not represent all concerts for the tour.

1. "It's Not Just Me, It's Everybody"
2. "Children of the Empire"
3. "A Lot's Gonna Change"
4. "God Turn Me into a Flower"
5. "Andromeda"
6. "Grapevine"
7. "A Given Thing"
8. "Everyday"
9. "Wild Time"
10. "Twin Flame"
11. "Movies"
12. "Hearts Aglow"

Encore

1. "Something to Believe"
2. "Picture Me Better"

== Tour dates ==
List of 2022 shows
Date (2022)	City	Country	Venue
North America
December 8	Los Angeles	United States	Theatre at the Ace Hotel
December 9	Los Angeles	United States	Theatre at the Ace Hotel

List of 2023 shows
Date (2023)	City	Country	Venue	Opening act(s)
Europe
January 28	Berlin	Germany	Festsaal Kreuzberg	Sam Burton
January 30	Stockholm	Sweden	Berns	Sam Burton
January 31	Oslo	Norway	Rockefeller Music Hall	Sam Burton
February 1	Copenhagen	Denmark	Vega	Sam Burton
February 3	Cologne	Germany	Kulturkirche	Sam Burton
February 4	Paris	France	Le Trianon	Sam Burton
February 5	Brussels	Belgium	Le Botanique	Sam Burton
February 6	Amsterdam	Netherlands	Paradiso	Sam Burton
February 8	London	United Kingdom	Roundhouse	Sam Burton
February 9	Bristol	United Kingdom	SWX	Sam Burton
February 10	Glasgow	United Kingdom	QMU	Sam Burton
February 12	Dublin	Ireland	Vicar Street	Sam Burton
February 13	Manchester	United Kingdom	The Ritz	Sam Burton
February 14	Brighton	United Kingdom	CHALK	Sam Burton
North America
February 22	Nashville, Tennessee	United States	Brooklyn Bowl	—
February 23	Atlanta	United States	Variety Playhouse	—
February 24	Asheville, North Carolina	United States	The Orange Peel	—
February 25	Carrboro, North Carolina	United States	Cat's Cradle	—
February 27	Washington, D.C.	United States	9:30 Club	—
February 28	Philadelphia	United States	Union Transfer	—
March 3	Brooklyn	United States	Brooklyn Steel	—
March 5	Boston	United States	Roadrunner	—
March 7	Montreal	Canada	Corona Theatre	Molly Lewis
March 8	Toronto	Canada	Danforth Music Hall	Molly Lewis
March 9	Toronto	Canada	Danforth Music Hall	Molly Lewis
March 10	Detroit	United States	El Club	Molly Lewis
March 11	Chicago	United States	Riviera Theatre	Molly Lewis
March 13	Milwaukee	United States	Pabst Theater	Vagabon
March 14	Minneapolis	United States	First Avenue	Vagabon
March 15	Des Moines, Iowa	United States	Wooly's	Vagabon
March 17	Englewood, Colorado	United States	Gothic Theatre	Vagabon
March 18	Salt Lake City	United States	The Depot	Vagabon
March 19	Boise, Idaho	United States	Knitting Factory Concert House	Vagabon
March 21	Vancouver	Canada	Commodore Ballroom	Vagabon
March 22	Seattle	United States	The Showbox	Vagabon
March 23	Portland, Oregon	United States	McMenamins Crystal Ballroom	Vagabon
March 25	San Francisco	United States	The Regency Ballroom	Vagabon
March 28	Phoenix, Arizona	United States	The Van Buren	Vagabon
March 29	Santa Fe, New Mexico	United States	Meow Wolf	Vagabon
March 31	Austin, Texas	United States	Stubb's Waller Creek Amphiteather	Vagabon
April 1	Dallas	United States	Studio at The Factory	Vagabon
April 2	Tulsa, Oklahoma	United States	Cain's Ballroom	Vagabon
April 4	Atlanta	United States	The Eastern	Vagabon
April 5	Nashville, Tennessee	United States	Brooklyn Bowl	Vagabon
April 16 (Note: The shows on April 16 and 23, 2023, were part of Coachella.)	Indio, California	United States	Empire Polo Club	—
April 23	Indio, California	United States	Empire Polo Club	—
May 12 (Note: The shows on May 12, 13, and 14, 2023, were part of Kilby Block Party.)	Salt Lake City	United States	Utah State Fair	—
May 13	Salt Lake City	United States	Utah State Fair	—
May 14	Salt Lake City	United States	Utah State Fair	—
South America
May 21 (Note: The show on May 21, 2023, was part of the C6 Festival.)	São Paulo	Brazil	Ibirapuera Park	—
Oceania
May 29	Auckland	New Zealand	Powerstation	—
May 30	Wellington	New Zealand	Opera House	—
June 1 (Note: The shows on June 1 and 4, 2023, were part of Vivid Live.)	Sydney	Australia	Sydney Opera House	—
June 3	Brisbane	Australia	Princess	Jack Ladder
June 4	Sydney	Australia	Sydney Opera House	—
June 7 (Note: The shows on June 7 and 8, 2023, were part of Rising.)	Melbourne	Australia	The Forum	Lost Animal
June 8	Melbourne	Australia	The Forum	Lost Animal
June 9	Perth	Australia	The Rechabite	Nicholas Allbrook
Europe
June 21 (Note: The shows on June 21 and 25, 2023, were part of Glastonbury Festival.)	Pilton, Somerset	United Kingdom	Worthy Farm	—
June 24 (Note: The show on June 24, 2023, was part of the Colours Festival.)	Bexhill-on-Sea	United Kingdom	De La Warr Pavilion	—
June 25	Pilton, Somerset	United Kingdom	Worthy Farm	—
June 27	Lille	France	L'Aeronef	—
June 28	Frankfurt	Germany	Zoom	—
June 29 (Note: The show on June 29, 2023, was part of Rock Werchter.)	Werchter	Belgium	Werchter Festivalpark	—
July 1 (Note: The show on July 1, 2023, was part of Roskilde Festival.)	Roskilde	Denmark	Roskilde Festivalpladsen	—
North America
August 18 (Note: The shows since August 18 until September 10, 2023, were as the opening act for Beck and Phoenix's Summer Odyssey Tour.)	Rogers, Arkansas	United States	Walmart Arkansas Music Pavilion	—
August 20	Houston	United States	Cynthia Woods Mitchell Pavilion	—
August 21	Dallas	United States	Dos Equis Pavilion	—
August 22	Austin, Texas	United States	Moody Center	—
August 23	New Orleans	United States	The Joy Theater	—
August 25	Kansas City, Missouri	United States	The Truman	—
August 26	St. Louis	United States	The Pageant	—
August 27	Louisville, Kentucky	United States	Old Forester's Paristown Hall	—
August 29	Indianapolis	United States	The Vogue	—
August 30	Columbus, Ohio	United States	Newport Music Hall	—
September 1	Pittsburgh	United States	Roxian Theatre	—
September 2	Detroit	United States	Pine Knob Music Theatre	—
September 3	Toronto	Canada	Budweiser Stage	—
September 5	Boston	United States	MGM Music Hall at Fenway	—
September 8	Philadelphia	United States	TD Pavilion at the Mann	—
September 9	New York City	United States	Madison Square Garden	—
September 10	Columbia, Maryland	United States	Merriweather Post Pavilion	—
September 12	Richmond, Virginia	United States	The National	—
September 13	Charlotte, North Carolina	United States	The Fillmore Charlotte	—
September 14	Knoxville, Tennessee	United States	Bijou Theatre	—
Europe
October 28	Lisbon	Portugal	Lisboa ao Vivo	Núria Graham
October 29	Porto	Portugal	Hard Club	Núria Graham
October 30	Madrid	Spain	Sala la Paqui	Núria Graham
October 31	Barcelona	Spain	Sala Apollo	Vagabon
November 2	Lyon	France	Le Transbordeur	Vagabon
November 3	Milan	Italy	Alcatraz	Vagabon
November 4	Lausanne	Switzerland	Les Docks	Vagabon
November 6	Berlin	Germany	Astra	Vagabon
November 7	Utrecht	Netherlands	Tivoli (Grote Zaal)	Vagabon
November 8 (Note: The shows on November 8 and 13, 2023, were part of Pitchfork Music Festival.)	Paris	France	Salle Pleyel	Vagabon; Ichiko Aoba
November 9	Antwerp	Belgium	De Roma	Vagabon
November 11	Glasgow	United Kingdom	Old Fruitmarket	Vagabon
November 12	Leeds	United Kingdom	O2 Academy Leeds	Vagabon
November 13	London	United Kingdom	Eventim Apollo	Vagabon; Ichiko Aoba
November 14	Nottingham	United Kingdom	Rock City	Vagabon
North America
November 29	Mexico City	Mexico	Auditorio BB	—
