= Andromeda (Weyes Blood song) =

2019 single by Weyes Blood

Single by Weyes Blood

from the album Titanic Rising
- Released: January 17, 2019
- Genre: Folk
- Length: 4:40
- Label: Sub Pop
- Songwriter: Natalie Mering
- Producers: Natalie Mering; Jonathan Rado

Weyes Blood singles chronology
"Tears on Fire" (2017)	"Andromeda" (2019)	"Everyday" (2019)

Music video
- "Andromeda" on YouTube

"Andromeda" is a song recorded by American singer-songwriter Weyes Blood, released through Sub Pop on January 17, 2019, as the lead single from her fourth studio album Titanic Rising (2019). It was written by the artist, co-produced by her and Jonathan Rado, and mixed by Kenny Gilmore in Los Angeles. The song marked her first original release since her critically acclaimed 2016 album Front Row Seat to Earth. The artist included "Andromeda" in the set list of her In Holy Flux Tour. A music video was released in 2024.

== Background ==
After releasing her third studio album Front Row Seat to Earth, Weyes Blood signed in 2017 with record label Sub Pop, and initially planned to release a studio album the following year. She released "Andromeda" at the beginning of 2019, while the record company announced that her album would be available in the spring of the northern hemisphere. In February, she announced the album, titled Titanic Rising, while releasing the second single, "Everyday".

== Composition and production ==
"Andromeda" was written and produced by Weyes Blood along with Jonathan Rado, and mixed by Kenny Gilmore in Los Angeles. It has been described as a folk love song, with themes of mythology, astronomy and technology. It is a "galactic" ballad, in which "a twangy slide guitar plays around a spaced-out synthscape". Its lyrics are about "finding a relationship that withstands modern distractions and unrealistic expectations". Kitty Empire for The Guardian wrote that the song finds Weyes Blood "staring at the heavens, looking for 'something I might never find'." After being asked about the theme of the song, the singer stated:

"It's very loosely based on the Greek myth and the galaxy. But it's mostly based on this idea as a woman, accumulating wounds and having to go out there, and be tough, and also wanting to be won over, and how all these things kind of come into a confusing state in today's times. Because there's such a definite masculinity crisis, that it's really hard to ask anybody to save you, or to convince you of their trustworthiness. And it's really hard to take risks, because I think that kind of disappointment can be so distracting, and we've chosen to focus so much more on our careers and these other things, that it's hard to make love — true love — a priority, and be vulnerable like that. So I think the lyrics play with my own isolation and avoiding it."

== Critical reception ==
"Andromeda" was praised for its "atmosphere and production embellishments" that "keep it sounding fresh". While calling it "dizzying", the magazine's reviewer Leah Lu praised her vocals and lyrics, equipped with an "elegant swagger". The song was named by the Paste Magazine staff as the second best Weyes Blood song, while praising its "familiar structure and '80s-style percussion". Israel Daramola for Spin described "Andromeda" as "hypnotic" and "bluesy". Pitchfork placed the song at number 28 on its list of the Best Songs of 2019. The Fader also included the song in an unranked list of the staff's best songs of the year.

== Live performances ==
Weyes Blood performed "Andromeda", along with "Wild Time" and "Picture Me Better", at a Tiny Desk Concert for NPR Music, published on December 11, 2019. The song was later added to the setlist of the In Holy Flux Tour (2022–2023). The singer also sang the song at Glastonbury Festival on June 25 of that year.

== Music video ==
A music video for "Andromeda" was released on April 15, 2024, over five years after its release. It was directed by the artist along with Ambar Navarro and Colton Stock. Its filming began in 2018 and was ultimately completed in 2024, marking the album's fifth anniversary. In the video, Weyes Blood plays three roles: a traveler marooned on a desert planet, an astronaut on a spacewalk, and interstellar royalty riding on an asteroid. It was described by Rolling Stone as a "psychedelic odyssey featuring Mering in a Barbarella-esque metallic suit".

== Certifications ==
Region	Certification	Certified units/sales
United States (RIAA)	Gold	500,000^{‡}
^{‡} Sales+streaming figures based on certification alone.
