= It's Not Just Me, It's Everybody =

Single by Weyes Blood

from the album And in the Darkness, Hearts Aglow
- Released: September 12, 2022
- Studio: Studio Three at EastWest Studios (Los Angeles, California)
- Length: 6:17
- Label: Sub Pop
- Songwriter: Natalie Mering
- Producers: Ben Babbitt; Jonathan Rado; Natalie Mering

Weyes Blood singles chronology
"Titanic Risen" (2021)	"It's Not Just Me, It's Everybody" (2022)	"Grapevine" (2022)

Music video
- "It's Not Just Me, It's Everybody" on YouTube

"It's Not Just Me, It's Everybody" is a song by American singer, songwriter, and musician Weyes Blood, which serves as the lead single for her fifth studio album And in the Darkness, Hearts Aglow. The song was released on September 12, 2022, by Sub Pop. The song was written by Weyes Blood, Ben Babbitt and Jonathan Rado. It was included in the set list of her In Holy Flux Tour.

== Style and critical reception ==
Weyes Blood refers to the song as a "Buddhist anthem, ensconced in the interconnectivity of all beings, and the fraying of our social fabric." Musically, the track features swells of orchestral strings and harp from Mary Lattimore.

Rolling Stone's Angie Martoccio called it a "dreamy six-minute" song "which opens with [the singer's] voice floating across the piano." BrooklynVegan's Bill Pearis called the song "gorgeous". Pitchfork chose the song as the best new track of the week, with their writer Allison Hussey saying "Over a soft bed of piano and percussion, Natalie Mering makes a blunt observation about the human condition", highlighting the lyrics "We've all become strangers/Even to ourselves". Hussey notes that "As Mering repeats the title refrain", the said refrain acts as an "assertion that she's not the only one suffering [which] lingers alongside her own reminder that 'it's all a part of the same thing': Being good to one another won't fix the world as it is, but it can at least make each day a little more bearable."

== Music video ==
The music video for "It's Not Just Me, It's Everybody" was released on September 28, 2022. It was directed by Charlotte Ercoli and features Mering as the last person alive on Earth dancing amid debris and the dead.

== Personnel ==
- Natalie Mering – vocals, songwriter, producer
- Mary Lattimore – harp
- Ben Babbitt – producer, arranger
- Jonathan Rado – producer
- Drew Erickson – arranger
- Kenny Gilmore – mixing engineer
- Andrew Sarlo, Chad Gordon, Jacob Kell, Rias Reed, and Sean Cook – recording engineers
