= Triennale Game Collection =

- Genre: Various
- Developer: Various
- Publishers: Triennale di Milano; Santa Ragione
- Platforms: Android, iOS, Windows, MacOS
- First release: 2016
- Latest release: 2022

The Triennale Game Collection is a series of original independent video game anthologies, published for free in 2016 and 2022 at the occasions of the 21st and 23rd Triennale di Milano and of the Milano Game Festival.

== Concept ==
The collection is introduced as "a virtual exhibition of video games" showcasing their "artists’ experimental approach to interactivity". The games are developed specifically for the collection by various creators from around the world. The project is overseen by Pietro Righi Riva and the studio Santa Ragione.

== Games ==
=== Volume 1 ===
The five games from the first collection (2016) are the following:

1. Il Filo Conduttore, by Mario von Rickenbach and Christian Etter
2. LOCK, by Auriea Harvey and Michaël Samyn (Tale of Tales)
3. Neighbor, by Jake Elliott, Tamas Kemenczy and Ben Babbitt (Cardboard Computer)
4. A Glass Room, by Pol Clarissou
5. The Worm Room, by Everest Pipkin

=== Volume 2 ===
The five games from the second collection (2022) are the following:

1. WADE, by Optillusion
2. We Are Poems, by Fern Goldfarb-Ramallo
3. Nonno’s Legend, by Nina Freeman (Star Maid Games)
4. MINE, by Adkwasi Bediako Afrane
5. Contact, by Llaura McGee (Dreamfeel)

== Development ==
First published from June 16, 2016, with a game each week on Android and iOS, the first volume of the collection was then adapted for Windows and MacOS computers in a version released on December 7, 2016. Two of the games, Il Filo Conduttore and The Worm Room, were later rereleased by their artists as standalone updated versions.

The second volume is launched for the 23rd Triennale, with five games for Android, iOS, Windows and MacOS published between July 12 and September 30, 2022.

== See also ==
- Triennale di Milano
- Art game
