= And in the Darkness, Hearts Aglow =

Studio album by Weyes Blood
- Released: November 18, 2022
- Studio: Studio Three at EastWest (Los Angeles)
- Genres: Chamber pop; indie pop; folk rock
- Length: 46:22
- Label: Sub Pop
- Producers: Ben Babbitt; Jonathan Rado; Natalie Mering; Rodaidh McDonald

Weyes Blood chronology
Titanic Rising (2019)	And in the Darkness, Hearts Aglow (2022)

Singles from And in the Darkness, Hearts Aglow
- 1. "It's Not Just Me, It's Everybody" Released: September 12, 2022; 2. "Grapevine" Released: October 11, 2022; 3. "God Turn Me into a Flower" Released: November 16, 2022; 4. "Children of the Empire" Released: April 10, 2023

And in the Darkness, Hearts Aglow is the sixth studio album by American singer, songwriter, and musician Weyes Blood, released on November 18, 2022, by Sub Pop. The album is the second in a trilogy of recordings that began with Mering's previous studio album Titanic Rising (2019), describing the sequel as a personal response "to being in the thick of it." A record with a chamber pop, indie pop, and folk rock sound, it was entirely produced by the singer and Jonathan Rado, with additional production by Ben Babbitt and Rodaidh McDonald.

And in the Darkness, Hearts Aglow received critical acclaim and earned the singer her first appearance on the U.S. Billboard 200. It reached the top 40 in New Zealand, Scotland, and the United Kingdom. The album was supported by four singles: "It's Not Just Me, It's Everybody", "Grapevine", "God Turn Me into a Flower", and "Children of the Empire". To promote the album, Weyes Blood embarked on the In Holy Flux Tour in 2023.

== Background and release ==
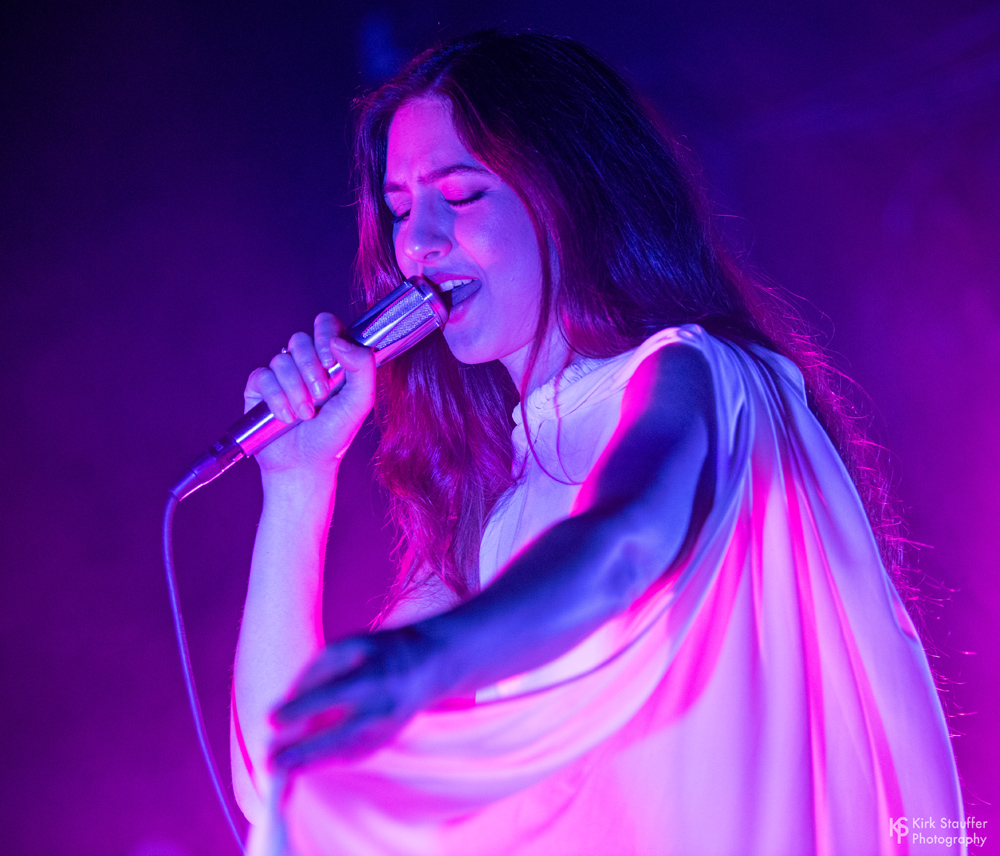
Weyes Blood singing in Seattle in 2023.

On September 12, 2022, Natalie Mering officially announced her fifth studio album And in the Darkness, Hearts Aglow set for release on November 18, 2022, and released its lead single "It's Not Just Me, It's Everybody" the same day. In promotion of the album, she embarked on the In Holy Flux Tour across North America and Europe in 2023. The second single, "Grapevine", followed on October 11, 2022. The song, which takes its title from a stretch of California highway known as "the Grapevine", is inspired by Mering's breakup with a "narcissistic" musician during the COVID-19 pandemic. The third single, "God Turn Me into a Flower", was released on November 16, 2022.

The album is the second entry into a trilogy of studio albums following 2019's Titanic Rising. According to Mering, Titanic Rising is an "observation, sounding the alarms that shit is going to go down," while And in the Darkness, Hearts Aglow is "my personal response to being in the thick of it". Mering's original concept for the artwork was to give the light inside her chest a "more alien" look.

== Composition ==
And in the Darkness, Hearts Aglow predominantly comprises a chamber pop, indie pop, and folk rock sound.

== Critical reception ==
Professional ratings
Aggregate scores
Source	Rating
AnyDecentMusic?	8.0/10
Metacritic	87/100
Review scores
Source	Rating
AllMusic	4.5/5 stars
The Daily Telegraph	5/5 stars
DIY	4/5 stars
Evening Standard	4/5 stars
The Independent	4/5 stars
The Guardian	4/5 stars
NME	5/5 stars
Pitchfork	8.4/10
Uncut	9/10
Under the Radar	9/10

And in the Darkness, Hearts Aglow received widespread acclaim from music critics. At Metacritic, which assigns a normalized rating out of 100 to reviews from mainstream critics, the album has an average score of 87 based on 25 reviews, indicating "universal acclaim". The editors of AnyDecentMusic? rated this release an 8.0 out of 10, based on 24 reviews.

The Wall Street Journal's Mark Richardson compared the album to Titanic Rising, Mering's previous studio album, saying it "easily matches its acclaimed predecessor in quality and scope." A five star review for NME praised the album direction and themes, saying "Mering's own vision of the end of the world is intricately woven and rich with melody" while also recognizing that "Mering's apparent take on heartbreak seems to be quietly optimistic". Alexis Petridis of The Guardian commended the album's complexity and musical experimentation, noting its musical inspirations such as Brian Wilson-esque arrangements and Karen Carpenter's vocal intonations. Similarly, a four star review by Helen Brown in The Independent noted a "a good range of textures across the 10 tracks" on the album.

The Daily Telegraph lauded the artist's compositions, saying that they "have leaned into glorious baroque madrigals, tenderly layering melodies and harmonies as if she were adorning a human body with pearls, coats and scarves". Writing for AllMusic, Fred Thomas highlighted the song "It's Not Just Me, It's Everybody" as a standout, and described the album as a "another step forward" for Mering, "building on the stunning sonic and emotional environments she tailored" on her previous albums.

=== Year-end lists ===
And in the Darkness, Hearts Aglow on year-end lists
Publication	Accolade	Rank	Ref.
Crack	The Top 50 Albums of the Year	32	
Consequence	Top 50 Albums of 2022	37	
The Line of Best Fit	The Best Albums of 2022 Ranked	2	
Mojo	Mojo's Top 75 Albums of 2022	14	
Paste	The 50 Best Albums of 2022	24	
Pitchfork	The 50 Best Albums of 2022	37	
Spin	The 22 Best Albums of 2022	1	
Stereogum	The 50 Best Albums of 2022	23	
NME	The 50 Best Albums of 2022	37	
Our Culture	The 50 Best Albums of 2022	7	

== Commercial performance ==
And in the Darkness, Hearts Aglow became Weyes Blood's first album to enter the U.S. Billboard 200 album chart, debuting and peaking at number 111; it charted for only one week. Also in the United States, the album topped the Heatseekers Albums chart, and peaked within the top ten on the Top Alternative Albums chart. In the United Kingdom, it reached the position 27; it marked her second appearance on the UK Albums Chart, following Titanic Rising in 2019. Additionally, the record reached the top 40 in New Zealand and Scotland, and the top 100 in other seven countries, including Germany, Ireland, Portugal, and Spain.

== Track listing ==
All tracks are written by Natalie Mering.

And in the Darkness, Hearts Aglow track listing
No.	Title	Arranger(s)	Length
1.	"It's Not Just Me, It's Everybody"	Ben Babbitt; Drew Erickson	6:16
2.	"Children of the Empire"	Drew Erickson	6:03
3.	"Grapevine"	Drew Erickson	5:25
4.	"God Turn Me into a Flower"	Babbitt	6:25
5.	"Hearts Aglow"	Drew Erickson	5:49
6.	"And in the Darkness"	Babbitt	0:14
7.	"Twin Flame"		4:22
8.	"In Holy Flux"		1:47
9.	"The Worst Is Done"	Babbitt	6:00
10.	"A Given Thing"		4:01
Total length:			46:22

== Personnel ==
Credits adapted from the liner notes of And in the Darkness, Hearts Aglow.

Musicians

- Natalie Mering – piano (1, 10), vocals (1–5, 7–10), synthesiser (2, 4, 9, 10), guitar (3, 9), organ (4, 7), musician (8)
- Kenny Gilmore – bass (1–3)
- Logan Hone – flute, clarinet, soprano saxophone, alto saxophone (1)
- Mary Lattimore – harp (1–3, 5)
- Joey Waronker – drums (1, 9)
- Ben Babbitt – wind arrangement (1), vocal arrangement (2, 5, 9), backing vocals (2–5, 9), cello arrangement (4)
- Drew Erickson – string arrangement (1–3, 5, 6), horn arrangement (2), organ (2, 3, 5)
- Michael D'Addario – drums (2, 3, 5)
- Brian D'Addario – guitar (2, 3), Wurlitzer (5)
- Andy Martin – vocals, piano, trombone (2, 3)
- Jonathan Rado – synthesiser (2, 3, 9), electronics (2), bass, tubular bells (3, 5), drum machine, guitar (7), musician (8)
- Michael Chadwick – synthesiser (3), harpsichord (5)
- Andres Renteria – shaker (3, 5)
- Cornella Babbitt – cello (4)
- Charlie Bisharat – electric violin (4)
- Daniel Lopatin – synthesiser (4)
- Meg Duffy – guitar (5)
- Sean Cook – cowbell (9)
- Sebastian Steinberg – bass (9)
- The Nona Strings Quartet (1–3, 5, 6):
  - Jacob Braun – cello
  - Andrew Bulbrook – 1st violin
  - Zach Dellinger – viola
  - Wynton Grant – 2nd violin
- Blake Cooper – tuba (2, 3)
- Dan Fornero – trumpet (2, 3)

Technical

- Natalie Mering – production
- Jonathan Rado – production
- Ben Babbitt – additional production (1, 4, 5, 9), additional vocal production (2)
- Emily Lazar – mastering
- Chris Allgood – mastering
- Kenny Gilmore – mixing
- Andrew Sarlo – engineering (1–6, 8)
- Sean Cook – additional engineering (1–3, 5), engineering (4, 7, 9)
- Chad Gordon – additional engineering (1–6, 8), string engineering (1–3, 5, 6)
- Rias Reed – additional engineering (1–6, 8), string engineering (1–3, 5, 6)
- Jacob Kell – string engineering assistance (1–3, 5, 6)
- Sarah Tudzin – additional engineering (4, 9)
- Peter Labberton – engineering (10)

Artwork

- Elijah Funk – design, cover art concept
- Dusty Summers – design
- Neil Krug – photography, cover art concept
- Natalie Mering – cover art concept

== Charts ==
Chart performance for And in the Darkness, Hearts Aglow
Chart (2022)	Peak position
Australian Digital Albums (ARIA)	8
Australian Hitseekers Albums (ARIA)	2
Belgian Albums (Ultratop Flanders)	96
Dutch Albums (Album Top 100)	76
French Albums (SNEP)	145
German Albums (Offizielle Top 100)	68
Irish Albums (IRMA)	82
New Zealand Albums (RMNZ)	30
Portuguese Albums (AFP)	46
Scottish Albums (Official Charts)	14
Spanish Albums (Promusicae)	76
Swiss Albums (Schweizer Hitparade)	90
UK Albums (Official Charts)	27
UK Americana Albums (Official Charts)	2
UK Independent Albums (Official Charts)	2
US Billboard 200	111
US Independent Albums (Billboard)	18
US Heatseekers Albums (Billboard)	1
US Top Alternative Albums (Billboard)	10
US Top Rock Albums (Billboard)	14
US Top Rock & Alternative Albums (Billboard)	19

== Release history ==
Release dates and formats for And in the Darkness, Hearts Aglow
Region	Date	Format(s)	Label	Ref.
Various	November 18, 2022	Cassette; CD; digital download; LP; streaming	Sub Pop	
