= The Innocents (Weyes Blood album) =

Studio album by Weyes Blood
- Released: October 21, 2014
- Recorded: c.2012–2014
- Genre: Psychedelic folk
- Length: 44:32
- Label: Mexican Summer

Weyes Blood chronology
The Outside Room (2011)	The Innocents (2014)	Cardamom Times (2015)

Singles from The Innocents
- 1. "Some Winters" Released: June 26, 2014

Professional ratings
Aggregate scores
Source	Rating
AnyDecentMusic?	7.7/10
Metacritic	82/100
Review scores
Source	Rating
AllMusic	4.5/5 stars
Consequence of Sound	B
Loud and Quiet	8/10
Pitchfork	7.7/10
PopMatters	7/10
Tiny Mix Tapes	4/5
Uncut	8/10

The Innocents is the third studio album by American musician Weyes Blood. The album was released on October 21, 2014, by Mexican Summer.

== Background ==
The album was recorded in rural Pennsylvania, Mering's apartment and Gary's Electric Studio in Greenpoint, Brooklyn. Mering described the theme of the album as being "about my first real relationship that went really awry."

== Critical reception ==
The Innocents received acclaim from music critics. At Metacritic, which assigns a normalized rating out of 100 reviews from mainstream publications, the album received an average score of 82, based on 7 reviews. Stephen M. Deusner of Pitchfork wrote that "These finely wrought songs introduce a fascinating and confidently subversive artist and offers a glimpse of the road she's traveling."

== Track listing ==
All tracks are written by Natalie Mering.

No.	Title	Length
1.	"Land of Broken Dreams"	4:31
2.	"Hang On"	3:45
3.	"Some Winters"	6:15
4.	"Summer"	2:47
5.	"Requiem for Forgiveness"	4:29
6.	"Ashes"	5:27
7.	"Bad Magic"	5:54
8.	"February Skies"	4:45
9.	"Montrose"	2:57
10.	"Bound to Earth"	3:38
Total length:		44:32

== Charts ==
Chart performance for The Innocents
Chart (2022)	Peak position
UK Independent Album Breakers (OCC)	20
