= Grapevine (Weyes Blood song) =

2022 song by Weyes Blood

Single by Weyes Blood

from the album And in the Darkness, Hearts Aglow
- Released: October 11, 2022
- Genre: Folk rock
- Length: 5:25
- Label: Sub Pop
- Songwriter: Natalie Mering
- Producers: Natalie Mering; Jonathan Rado

Weyes Blood singles chronology
"It's Not Just Me, It's Everybody" (2022)	"Grapevine" (2022)	"God Turn Me into a Flower" (2022)

Music video
- "Grapevine" on YouTube

"Grapevine" is a song recorded by American singer-songwriter Weyes Blood, released on October 11, 2022, as the third single from her fifth studio album, And in the Darkness, Hearts Aglow (2022). It was written and produced by the artist along with Jonathan Rado. A folk rock track, its arrangement surrounds her voice with acoustic guitars and synthesizers. A music video was released on October 28, 2022. "Grapevine" was included in the set list of her In Holy Flux Tour.

The song received positive reviews from music critics and became her first charting single, on the U.S. Adult Alternative Airplay record chart published by Billboard.

== Composition ==
"Grapevine" has been described as a lush, swirling folk rock song. Produced and recorded at the EastWest Studios in Hollywood, and written by the singer, it is a song set along the titular stretch of Southern California's Interstate 5. The song studies "the remains of a dead relationship", and is about breaking up with a "narcissistic" musician she'd been in love with during the COVID-19 pandemic. It contains a soft acoustic guitar and measured drums, while having a mix of strings and synthesizers, a tolling bell and somber bass lines.

In a statement about the song, the singer said: "Technology is harvesting our attention away from each other. We all have a 'Grapevine' entwined around our past with unresolved wounds and pain. Being in love doesn't necessarily mean being together. Why else do so many love songs yearn for a connection?"

== Critical reception ==
While giving the song 3.5 stars out of 5, Far Out reviewer Tom Taylor described the song as "sumptuous", and wrote: "It might not be as instantly ensnaring as the debut single from the new record, but it certainly shows off the skills of one of the finest singers around". "Grapevine" was described by Rolling Stone as a "sprawling song" with an "epic and emotional adventure". NME described it as "epic". Weyes Blood's "warm, pure alto" voice on the track was compared to the vocals from Karen Carpenter.

== Music video ==
A nautical-themed music video for the song, directed by Charlotte Ercoli, was released on October 28, 2022. In the video, the backdrop is a "seasonally spooky, deserted road", where the artist's car has broken down and "wanders the increasingly surreal landscape".

== Charts ==
Weekly chart performance for "Grapevine"
Chart (2022–2023)	Peak position
US Adult Alternative Airplay (Billboard)	32
