= Front Row Seat to Earth =

Studio album by Weyes Blood
- Released: October 21, 2016
- Genres: Baroque pop; psychedelic folk; folk-pop; psychedelic pop
- Length: 44:46
- Label: Mexican Summer
- Producers: Natalie Mering; Chris Cohen

Weyes Blood chronology
Cardamom Times (2015)	Front Row Seat to Earth (2016)	Titanic Rising (2019)

Singles from Front Row Seat to Earth
- 1. "Seven Words" Released: August 10, 2016; 2. "Do You Need My Love?" Released: September 7, 2016; 3. "Generation Why" Released: October 3, 2016

Front Row Seat to Earth is the fourth studio album by American musician Weyes Blood. It was released on October 21, 2016, by Mexican Summer. Musically, the album explores several genres like baroque pop, psychedelic folk, folk-pop, and psychedelic pop. Front Row Seat to Earth was acclaimed by music critics, with one of them comparing the singer with Karen Carpenter.

Front Row Seat to Earth was supported by three singles: "Seven Words", released on August 10, 2016, "Do You Need My Love?", released on September 7, 2016, and "Generation Why", released on October 3, 2016. Despite not being promoted as a single, "Used to Be" received a music video on November 7, 2016. The album's cover art was photographed by Katie Miller beside the Salton Sea.

== Composition ==
Donning "the misty sounds of late '60s folk and '70s AM radio," Front Row Seat to Earth pushes forward in Blood's "glacial slide towards psychedelic folk", yielding comparisons to Kevin Ayers, Vashti Bunyan, Linda Perhacs, and Bridget St. John. The lyrics are based on various subjects, including romantic difficulties ("Do You Need My Love?"), addiction ("Diary"), and concerns about the modern world ("Generation Why"). The latter would be further explored on Natalie Mering's following album, Titanic Rising (2019).

== Singles ==
"Seven Words" was released as the album's lead single on August 10, 2016. It was called "Best New Track" by Pitchfork, with reviewer Sam Sodomsky stating that the song "conjures a kaleidoscopic vision of the 1970s' best kept secrets". An accompanying music video was released the same day, in which Mering is kidnapped by a taxi driver who forcibly feeds her with something that looks like octopus, after which she turns into a mermaid. Mexican Summer issued a 7-inch single for "Seven Words" in October 2016, which featured digital bonus track "Three Tears" as a B-side. Some of these were distributed randomly to Vinyl Me Please subscribers, while others were sold on tour at Weyes Blood gigs.

"Do You Need My Love" was released digitally on September 7, 2016, as the album's second single. Like with the previous single, Pitchfork also called the song "Best New Track". "Generation Why", the album's third single, followed on October 3, 2016.

A promotional video for "Used To Be" was also released on November 7, after the album had been issued.

== Critical reception ==
Professional ratings
Aggregate scores
Source	Rating
AnyDecentMusic?	7.7/10
Metacritic	82/100
Review scores
Source	Rating
AllMusic	3.5/5 stars
Clash	8/10
Exclaim!	8/10
The Guardian	5/5 stars
The Line of Best Fit	8/10
The Observer	3/5 stars
Pitchfork	8.3/10
Uncut	8/10
Under the Radar	8.5/10

Front Row Seat to Earth received widespread acclaim from music critics. At Metacritic, which assigns a normalized rating out of 100 to reviews from mainstream publications, the album received an average score of 82, based on 12 reviews. Michael Hann for The Guardian, referred to the album as "beautiful, unsettling and wholly compelling". Emily Mackay of The Observer gave a lukewarm review, even though she stated that Mering's "deep, pure, Karen Carpenter croon...could still slavering beasts".

=== Accolades ===
Publication	List	Rank	Ref.
Pitchfork	The 50 Best Albums of 2016	43	
Under the Radar	Top 100 Albums of 2016	9	

== Track listing ==
All tracks are written by Natalie Mering.

No.	Title	Length
1.	"Diary"	5:36
2.	"Used to Be"	4:32
3.	"Be Free"	6:22
4.	"Do You Need My Love?"	6:25
5.	"Generation Why"	5:21
6.	"Can't Go Home"	4:40
7.	"Seven Words"	4:37
8.	"Away Above"	5:18
9.	"Front Row Seat"	1:55
Total length:		44:46

=== Note ===
- The digital download that came with the vinyl edition also featured an exclusive bonus track, "Three Tears" (4:59), that played at the end of the album after "Front Row Seat". It also featured on the B-side of the 7" edition of "Seven Words", but has otherwise not been made available elsewhere.

== Personnel ==
Credits are adapted from the album's liner notes.

- Natalie Mering – production, artwork
- Chris Cohen – production (all tracks), drums (tracks 1, 2, 7), guitar (2)
- Kenneth Gilmore – mixing (all tracks), bass (2–4, 7)
- David Ives – mastering
- Michael Chadwick – synthesizer (1, 4, 6)
- Luke Csehak – horns (2, 10), tambourine (7)
- Shags Chamberlain – synthesizer (2, 4, 9)
- Booker Stardrum – drums (4)
- John Lindsay – piano (5)
- Meg Duffy – slide guitar (7)
- Alex Brettin – flutes (7)
- Evan Howard Hill – artwork
- Katie Miller – photography
- Rob Carmichael – layout

== Charts ==
Chart performance for Front Row Seat to Earth
Chart (2016)	Peak position
UK Independent Album Breakers (OCC)	14
US Heatseekers Albums (Billboard)	23
