= Kentucky Route Zero =

2020 adventure video game

- Developer: Cardboard Computer
- Publisher: Annapurna Interactive
- Designers: Jake Elliott; Tamas Kemenczy; Ben Babbitt
- Programmers: Jake Elliott; Tamas Kemenczy
- Artist: Tamas Kemenczy
- Writer: Jake Elliott
- Composer: Ben Babbitt
- Engine: Unity
- Platforms: Linux; Windows; macOS; Nintendo Switch; PlayStation 4; Xbox One; Android; iOS; PlayStation 5; Xbox Series X/S
- Release: January 28, 2020: Act I; January 7, 2013; Act II; May 31, 2013; Act III; May 6, 2014; Act IV; July 19, 2016; Act V; January 28, 2020
- Genres: Point-and-click adventure; Interactive fiction
- Mode: Single-player

Kentucky Route Zero is a 2013–2020 point-and-click adventure interactive fiction game developed by Cardboard Computer and published by Annapurna Interactive. The game follows the narrative of a truck driver named Conway and the strange people he meets as he tries to cross the mysterious Route Zero in Kentucky to make a final delivery for the antiques company he works for.

The game received acclaim for its visual art, narrative, characterization, atmosphere, and themes, appearing on several best-of-the-decade lists.

Kentucky Route Zero was first revealed in 2011 via the crowdfunding platform Kickstarter and is separated into five acts that were released sporadically throughout its development; the first releasing in January 2013 and the last releasing in January 2020. The game was developed for Linux, Windows, and macOS, with console ports for the Nintendo Switch, PlayStation 4, and Xbox One under the subtitle of "TV Edition", coinciding with the release of the final act. The game was released for Android and iOS on December 13, 2022, in partnership with Netflix and was later released for PlayStation 5 and Xbox Series X/S in August 2023.

== Gameplay ==
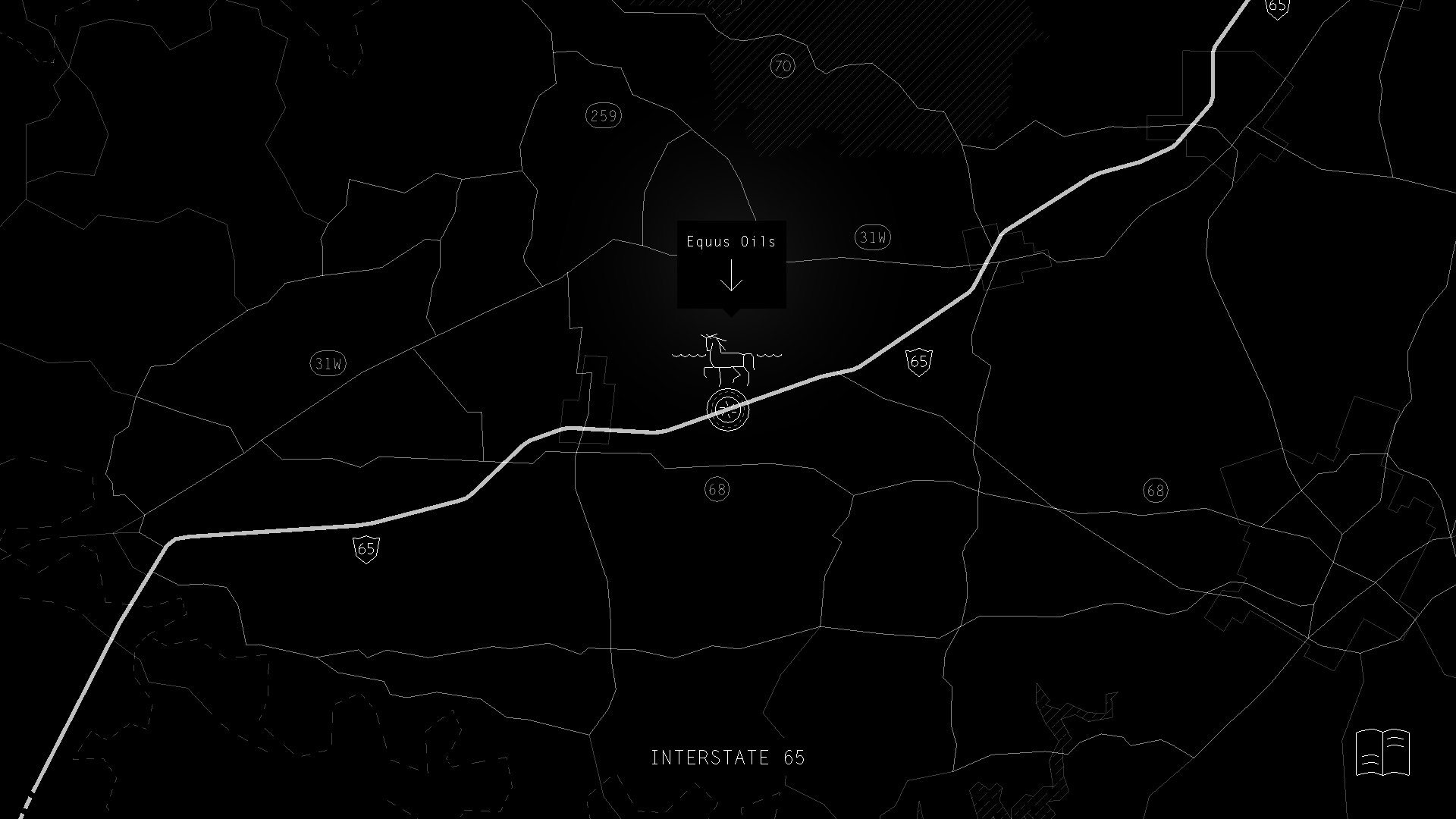
The story largely takes place in fictional places located around Interstate 65 in Kentucky and the Mammoth Cave National Park.

Kentucky Route Zero is a point and click game that contains text-driven dialogue. There are no traditional puzzles or challenges, with the focus of the game being storytelling and atmosphere. The game has been described as an "interactive screenplay." The player controls Conway by clicking on the screen, either to guide him to another location, or interact with other characters and objects. The player also has the choice to choose Conway's dialogue, and occasionally the dialogue of other characters, during in-game conversations. The game is separated into various locations, between which Conway can travel using his truck. A map is shown when traveling on the road, and the player must guide the truck icon to the destination of their choosing, mostly areas where the player has been pointed or sent out to go. The player also takes control of other characters at certain times.

== Plot ==
Conway, a truck driver, works as a delivery man for an antique shop owned by a woman named Lysette. Being hired to make a delivery to 5 Dogwood Drive, Conway travels the roads around Interstate 65 in Kentucky to locate the address, accompanied by his dog, whose name is chosen by the player. After searching around, Conway elaborates that he is lost and stops off by a gas station, Equus Oils.

=== Act I ===
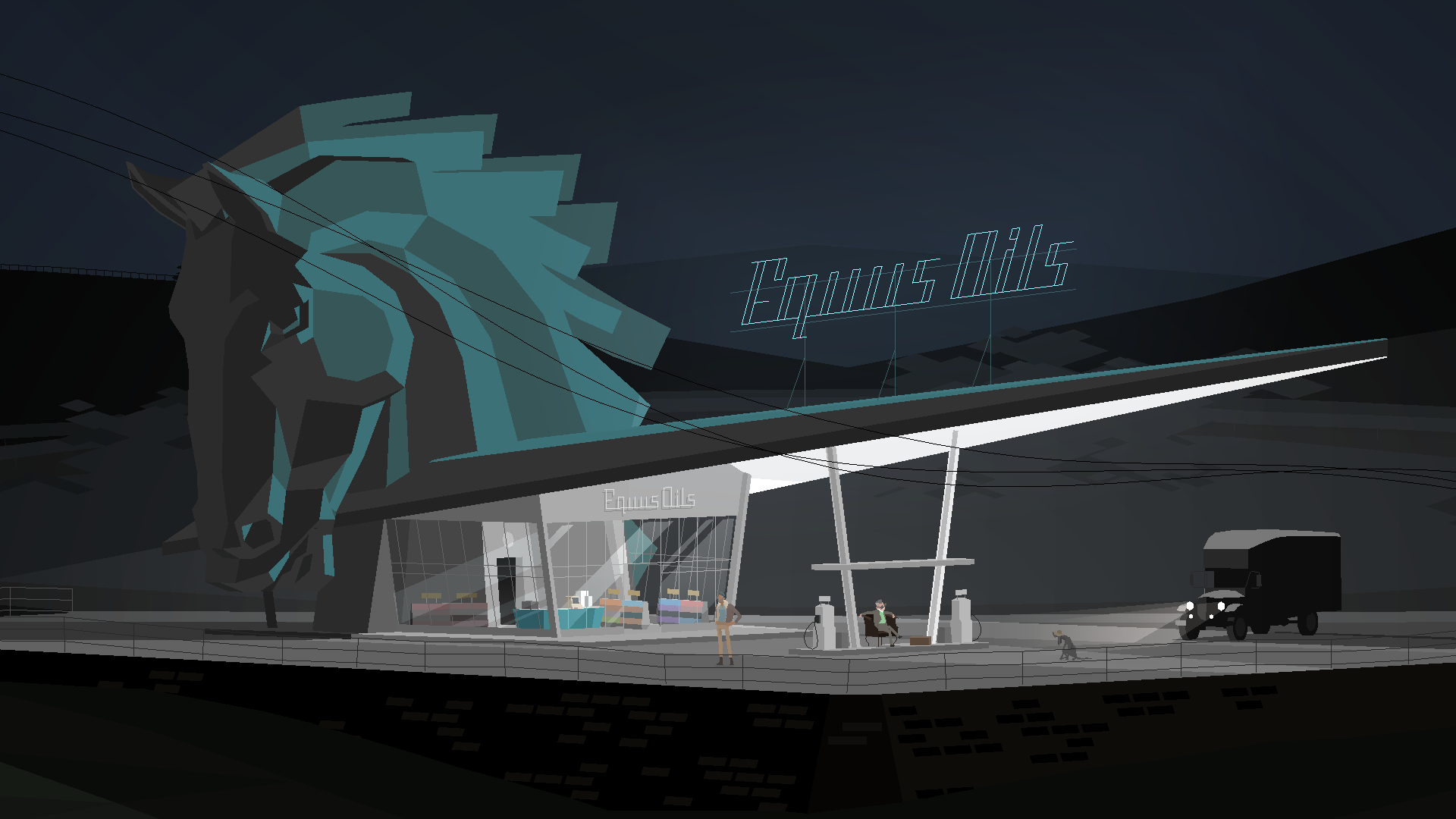
The game opens on Equus Oils, a gas station at which Conway asks for directions.

Conway arrives in the Equus Oils station and meets an old man named Joseph, who is the owner of the establishment. Joseph informs Conway that the only way to arrive at Dogwood Drive is by taking the mysterious Route Zero, and then tasks him to fix the circuit breaker to restore power in the station and use the computer to locate directions. Conway goes underneath the station and meets three people who are playing a strange game and ignore him completely. He is able to retrieve their lost 20-sided die but soon notices their disappearance afterwards, clearing a way to fix the electricity. When asking Joseph about the strange people who disappeared, he suggests Conway may have been hallucinating. Conway uses the computer to locate the directions of the Márquez Farm to talk to Weaver Márquez, who has a better understanding of the roads. As Conway leaves, Joseph tells him that he loaded a TV into the back of the truck to take to Weaver. Conway drives to the Márquez residence and meets Weaver. Weaver quizzically asks Conway a number of questions and Conway finally asks her about directions to Route Zero. She has Conway set up the TV and when Conway looks into the screen, he sees the vision of a strange farm and spaces out. When he wakes, Weaver informs him of her cousin Shannon who fixes TVs and gives him the directions to Route Zero, and suddenly disappears.

When arriving at the destination, Conway finds the area to actually be an abandoned mine shaft called Elkhorn Mine. He locates Shannon Márquez, who has been exploring the mines in search of something she has lost. Conway decides to help Shannon travel deeper into the mine, and begins toying with a PA system to test the depth and length of the tunnels. Unfortunately, the sound waves cause a portion of the mine to collapse. Conway injures his leg from falling rubble, and Shannon uses a track to help them travel through the mine. While exploring the mine, Shannon reveals the mine's tragic history, involving the deaths of many miners due to flooding. If the lamplight is turned off during the travel, ghostly visions of miners can be seen wandering the caves. Before exiting the mines, Shannon leaves Conway and travels a bit farther down the mine shaft, and comes across a heap of miner helmets. She comes back quickly without explaining anything. Conway and Shannon travel to Shannon's workshop, and then back to the Márquez Farm, where Shannon reveals that the Márquez family's debts had caused Weaver to flee. As Shannon attempts to fix the old TV, Conway looks in again. This time the picture of the farm begins to warp and separate, causing the screen to create an image of the opening to Route Zero and the truck driving down it.

=== Act II ===
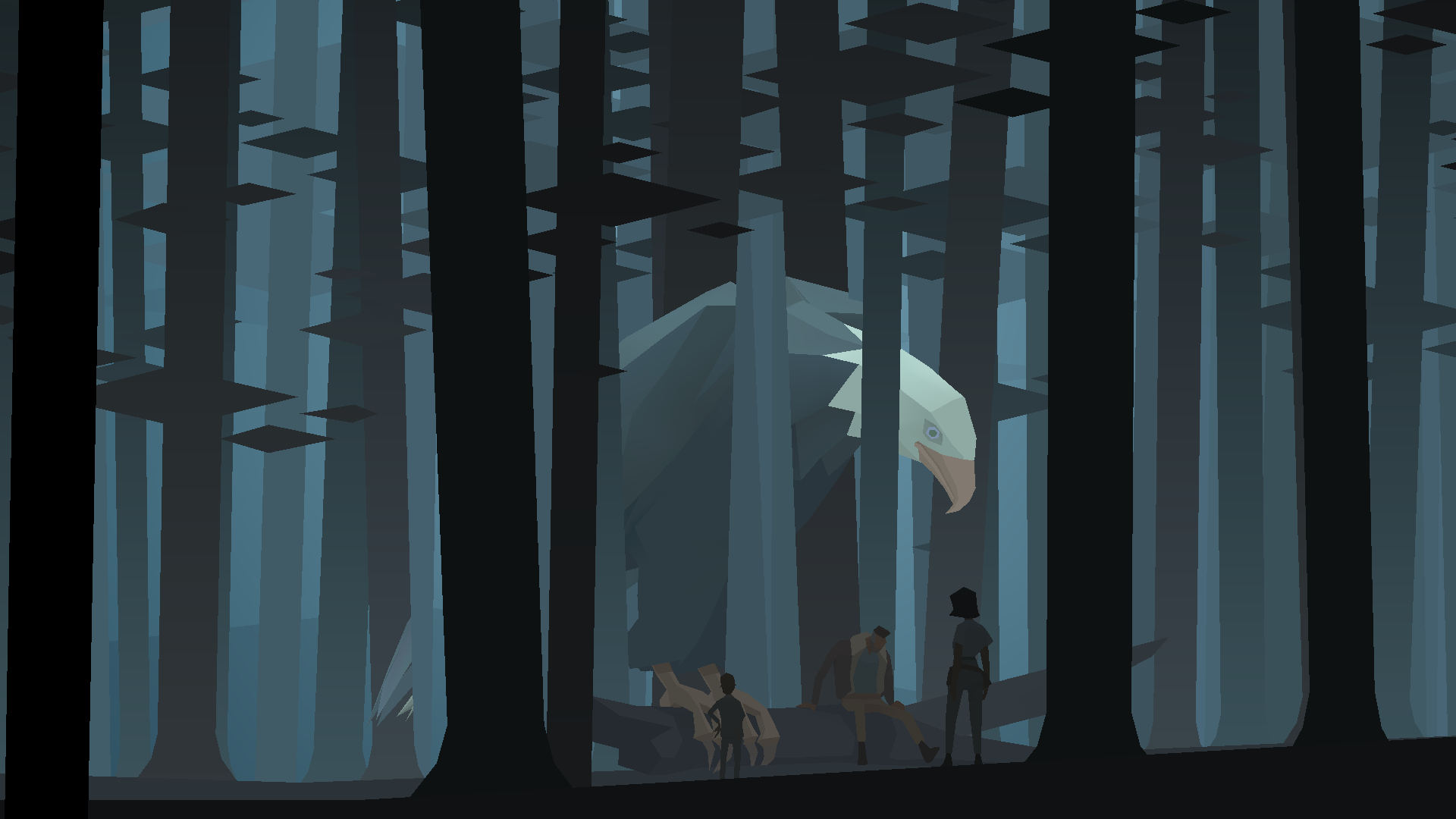
The characters traverse a forest looking for a doctor.

Act II opens with a prelude in which Lula Chamberlain, an installation artist whose work is featured in the Kentucky Route Zero bonus content Limits & Demonstrations, receives a rejection notice from the Gaston Trust for Imagined Architecture. After reading this notice, Chamberlain sorts through a series of proposals for reclaiming spaces for purposes alternate to their current function, such as a proposal to reclaim a basketball court as a dog kennel.

Following the prelude, the focus returns to Conway, Shannon, and Conway's dog. The three arrive at a six-story building known as the Bureau of Reclaimed Spaces. In the lobby they are told that in order to receive directions to Dogwood Drive they must first obtain an ingestion notice from within the Bureau. The receptionist suggests they seek out Lula Chamberlain, currently the Bureau's senior clerk. After a series of bureaucratic misdirections, the three manage to meet with Lula. She informs them that the directions to Dogwood Drive are at an off-site storage facility within an old church. Additionally she suggests Conway should seek out Doctor Truman for treatment of his injured leg. At the storage facility Conway chats about hobbies with the caretaker of the building and listens to a prerecorded sermon on the virtue of hard work while Shannon finds the record they are seeking. As they leave the building Conway collapses from his injury, hallucinating about Elkhorn Mine, and Shannon decides their first priority should be to find Doctor Truman and obtain treatment.

Upon their return, the receptionist at the Bureau tells the group that Doctor Truman can be found at his house off the highway. The group leaves Route Zero and goes back above ground in search of Doctor Truman. Arriving at the site, the group discovers that the doctor's house has been torn down and replaced with a museum—the Museum of Dwellings. While searching the museum, they encounter a young boy named Ezra, who claims his brother is Julian, a giant eagle. Ezra tells them the Doctor now lives in the Forest, and offers to fly them using Julian. The group accepts and after traveling through the strange illusory forest, lands in the woods. As Conway's condition worsens, Shannon helps him continue, and finally locates Doctor Truman's house. Doctor Truman tells Conway his injury is severe but treatable, and prescribes him an anesthetic called Neurypnol TM. Act II ends as Conway succumbs to the drug, causing his vision to grow black and the walls of the house to pull away to reveal the forest beyond.

=== Act III ===
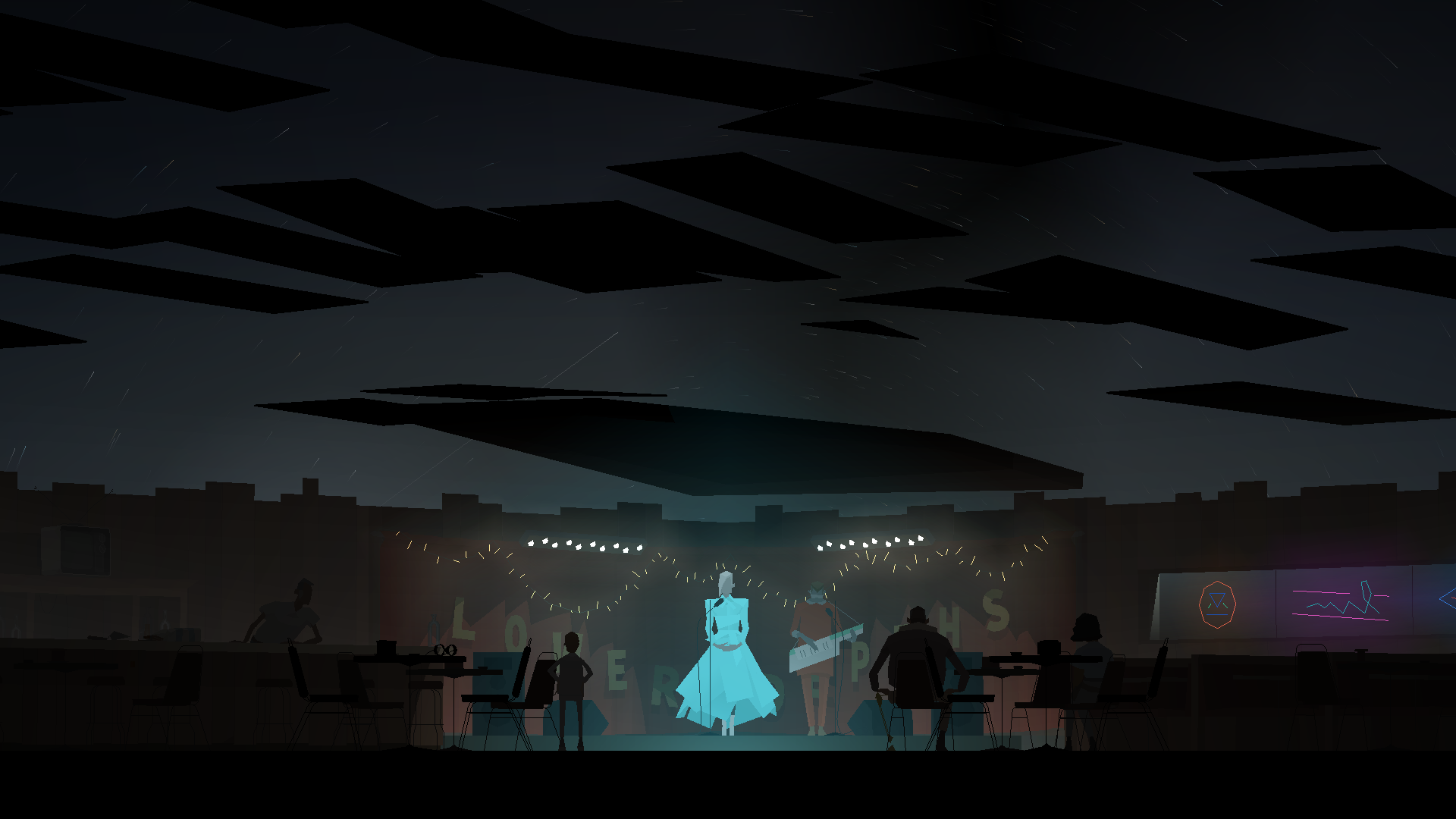
Junebug and Johnny perform at the bar The Lower Depths.

The Act opens with Conway dreaming of a previous conversation he had with Lysette. The two recall a tragic event involving Charlie, Lysette's son, and Lysette informs Conway of a new delivery to be made, which will be the last delivery of Lysette's antique shop. Conway awakens from the Neurypnol TM-induced sleep at Doctor Truman's house to find his injured leg replaced with a strange skeletal limb giving off a yellow glow. After returning to the Museum of Dwellings to find it closed for the night, Conway, Shannon and Ezra resume their search for Lula Chamberlain in Conway's truck. The three are quickly stopped again, however, after the truck's engine breaks down. While Shannon calls for a tow truck, two musicians, Johnny and Junebug, pass the group on a motorcycle with a sidecar, and after some discussion decide to help the group get the truck moving again in exchange for following them to the Lower Depths bar to watch their performance. The group agrees, traveling to the Lower Depths and talking with Harry, the bartender, who gives directions back to Route Zero. After their performance, Johnny and Junebug decide to accompany Conway, Shannon and Ezra on their travels.

Upon returning to Route Zero, the group comes across a large cave dominated by a rock spire, known as the Hall of the Mountain King. There they find various types of vintage electronics in many states of disrepair, including a large amount set on fire. They come across an old man named Donald who appears fixated on a grand computer project involving a "mold computer" that is enhanced by black mold growing inside it, as well as a piece of software designed as a comprehensive simulation called Xanadu. Donald claims that Lula was one of the people who designed Xanadu along with him, and that she had left a long time ago, but that there may be a way to find her using Xanadu. However, as Xanadu is not working correctly after an apparent sabotage from creatures Donald calls the Strangers, the group must travel to the Place Where the Strangers Come From in order to seek out their help. Conway and Shannon talk to the Strangers off-screen and, after returning with the solution, travel back with the group to the Hall of the Mountain King and fix Xanadu, using it to locate Lula. With Donald's help, she finds directions to Dogwood Drive, and tells the group to meet her at the Bureau of Reclaimed Spaces.

After arriving at the Bureau, Conway receives Lula's directions, which involve taking a ferry from the Bureau down a river. While waiting for the ferry, Conway reveals what happened while he was talking with the Strangers - he and Shannon had gone via a hidden elevator to an underground whiskey distillery staffed by odd, indistinct glowing skeletons, identical in appearance to Conway's new leg. While at the factory, Conway is mistaken for a new hire as a shipping truck driver and coerced into taking a drink of a very expensive whiskey, and is subsequently roped into a job driving trucks for the distillery to pay it off. Act III ends with the ferry arriving.

=== Act IV ===
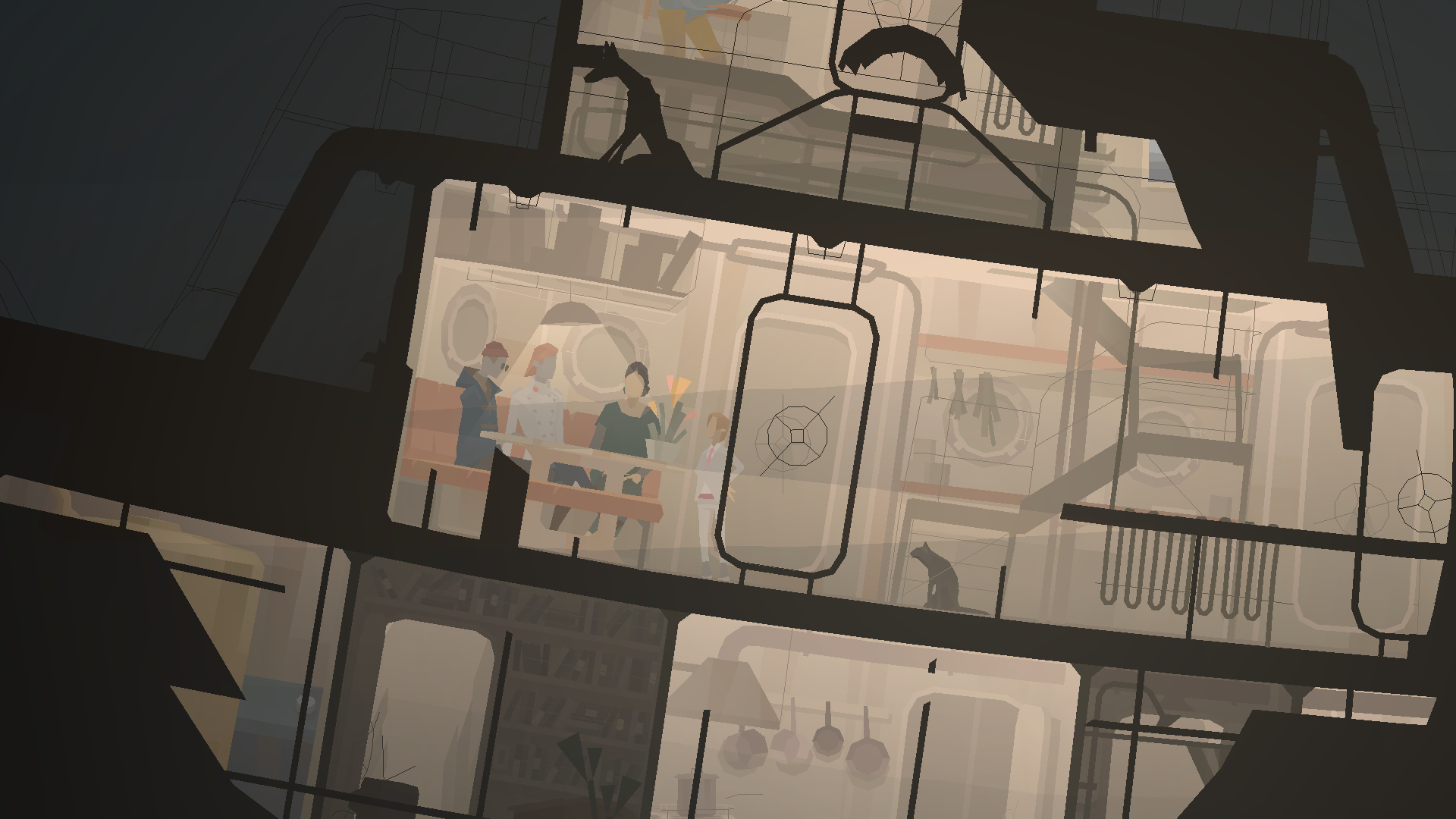
On board the old Mucky Mammoth tugboat, the characters travel across the Echo river.

Act IV takes place on and around The Mucky Mammoth tugboat ferry, as it goes around the underground river known as the Echo. Conway, Shannon, Ezra, Johnny, and Junebug continue downriver on the Echo with boat captain Cate, her assistant Will, and a passenger named Clara who plays the theremin. They make several short stops along the way - at a floating refueling station, a tiki bar called the Rum Colony, a waterside telephone booth, a psychological research facility called the Radvansky Center, and a cypress-covered island rich with edible mushrooms. Cate needs to deliver a package to a telephone exchange located in a flooded train tunnel, but the tugboat cannot pass through the area without disturbing a bat sanctuary, so Conway and Shannon agree to take a dinghy to reach the exchange station. They pass by a monument to the Elkhorn Mine disaster and then through the bat sanctuary. Conway, who has been drinking and whose behavior had become increasingly erratic, sees a boat full of glowing skeletons, similar to those at the whiskey distillery, and remarks that he's been seeing them repeatedly on the river journey. He tells Shannon he wants to take the job at the distillery and pass his delivery truck on to her; she is disturbed by his plan. Shannon delivers the package to Poppy, the lone remaining exchange operator, and when she turns around to re-board the dinghy, she finds that Conway has turned completely into a skeleton, and has boarded a skiff with two other skeletons, departing with them.

Shannon continues down the river alone on the dinghy and rendezvouses with the rest of the Mucky Mammoth passengers and crew at Sam & Ida's, a seafood restaurant. They eat and converse with the proprietors, then travel to a neighborhood of houseboats, where Clara gives a performance on theremin. Their last stop is the Silo of Late Reflections, where Shannon, Clara, Johnny, Junebug, and Ezra all disembark and unload Conway's truck. There is no clear path to get the truck from the Silo up to the surface; nevertheless, Shannon resolves to continue trying to make Conway's delivery to Dogwood Drive.

=== Act V ===
Act V begins after Shannon and her traveling companions have hauled all of the contents of Conway's truck to the top of the Silo of Late Reflections, which turns out to be a well at the center of an effigy mound in a small town. This town is the location of 5 Dogwood Drive – the house stands new and pristine, though the remaining town was washed out by a flash flood that occurred while the characters were underground on Route Zero and the Echo River. The travelers meet and converse with the residents of this town, and learn about its history and landmarks, including a graveyard, a library, a waffle restaurant, a hangar and airstrip, and a public-access television station. Both the travelers and the residents weigh whether they will try to stay and rebuild the community, or leave in hopes of better lives. One of the residents, Ron, digs a grave to bury "The Neighbors", two horses that were fixtures of town life and who died in the flood. An impromptu ceremony is held in honor of the horses; town resident Nikki reads a poem, and Emily sings a song, "I'm Going That Way". The final view is of Shannon and the group having moved the items from Conway's truck into 5 Dogwood Drive, completing his delivery, and gathering in the house.

== Development ==
In the early stages of development the developers were influenced by the works of Gabriel García Márquez, Flannery O'Connor and other Southern Gothic writers, and David Lynch. They also looked at theater scripts for inspiration, which later helped in characterization, dialogue, environment design and treatment of space, lighting and movement. It was developed using the Unity game engine.

The game was originally released for Linux, Windows, and OS X, with console ports for the Nintendo Switch, PlayStation 4, and Xbox One published by Annapurna Interactive under the subtitle of "TV Edition", coinciding with the release of the final act.

== Reception ==
Aggregate review scores
Game	Metacritic
Kentucky Route Zero – Act I	81/100
Kentucky Route Zero – Act II	82/100
Kentucky Route Zero – Act III	91/100
Kentucky Route Zero – Act IV	90/100
Kentucky Route Zero	PC: 86/100; NS: 87/100; PS4: 88/100; XONE: 87/100

Kentucky Route Zero has received positive reviews from critics. GameSpot referred to it as being "beautiful and mysterious enough to grip you," and IGN called it "a damn fine example of what makes the medium of video games so special." PC Gamer stated: "[It is a] powerfully evocative and beautiful subversion of point-and-click rote, but occasionally opaque and disorienting." The A.V. Club noted that "KRZ really is the masterpiece critics have been lauding it as for years" and that "anyone with an interest in storytelling, existential mysteries, and the way art can reflect our poor and hollowed world should play it." The Washington Post called it "one of the most important games of the [2010s]."

It was nominated for the Games For Impact award at The Game Awards 2020 and for the 2021 Nebula Award for Best Game Writing. Kentucky Route Zero: TV Edition was nominated for the Narrative award and won the Original Property award at the 2021 BAFTA Games Awards. During the 24th Annual D.I.C.E. Awards, the Academy of Interactive Arts & Sciences nominated Kentucky Route Zero for Adventure Game of the Year, as well as Outstanding Achievement in Game Direction, in Story, and for an Independent Game.

=== Recognition ===
Kentucky Route Zero was recognized as game of the year in 2013 by Rock Paper Shotgun, in 2014 by Kill Screen and Paste, and in 2020 by Slate and Kotaku, the latter with journalist Ian Walker calling the title "the most important game of the year [or] the most important game of all time." Also in 2020, Paste and Polygon ranked it among their yearly top games, as #3 and #5 respectively.

At the end of the 2010s, Kentucky Route Zero was ranked 3rd best game of the decade by Paste, 4th by Polygon, 5th by Les Inrockuptibles, 7th by Focus Vif, 23rd by GQ, and 50th by GamesRadar+. Additionally, Polygon described Kentucky Route Zero as "the most important game of the decade."

In 2020, Eurogamer had Kentucky Route Zero among its "top 10 games of the generation" as #3. In 2021‚ Rock Paper Shotgun ranked it #15 in its "100 top PC games of all time" list, describing it as "one of the best stories yet told in games." It has since been named among the best video games of all time by Polygon in 2017, GamesTM in 2018, Hyper in 2018, and Slant in 2018 and 2020. Edge has also included the game in its list of the greatest games since 1993.

Kentucky Route Zero was also influential on the industry: Le Monde reported on how the title left its mark on the narrative games of its time, citing Night in the Woods, Bury Me, My Love, No Longer Home, and Mutazione. The writer of the latter, Hannah Nicklin of Die Gute Fabrik, called Kentucky Route Zero a "modern classic" and a "[milestone] in the history of a medium."

Kentucky Route Zero was part of the works exhibited at the Victoria and Albert Museum in the exhibition Videogames: Design/Play/Disrupt curated by Marie Foulston and Kristian Volsing, presented from September 2018 to February 2019 in London. A section of the exhibition focused on the game's development, presenting design documents and reference works used by the authors. The museum also exhibited the painting The Blank Signature by René Magritte side by side with a projection of a scene from Kentucky Route Zero inspired by the artwork. The exhibition was moved to V&A Dundee in Scotland from April 2019 to September 2019.

Kentucky Route Zero was also exhibited at the Lisbon Architecture Triennale in the exhibition Inner Spaces. The exhibition was presented at the Chiado Museum from October 2019 to January 2020.
