= Weyes Blood =

American musician (born 1988)

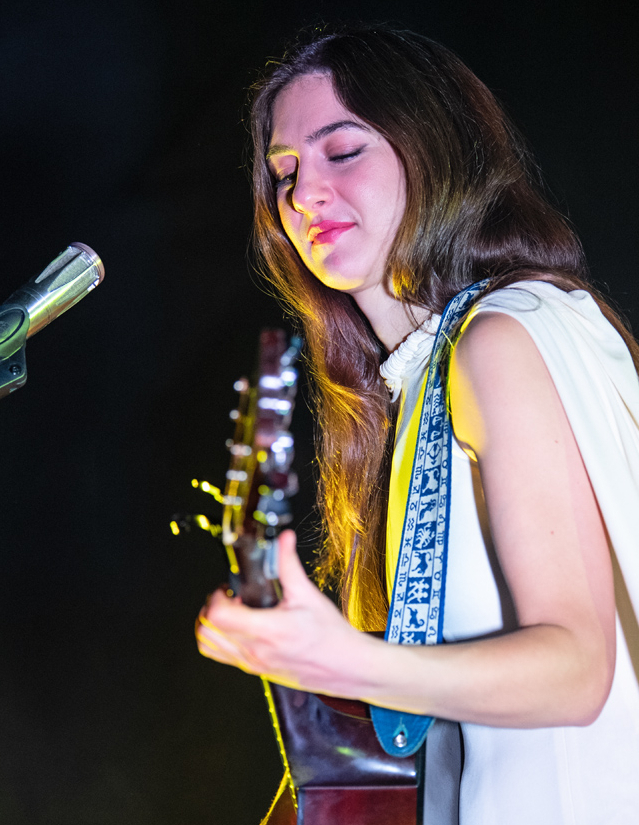
- Mering performing at The Showbox in Seattle, Washington, 2023

Background information
- Also known as: Weyes Bluhd
- Born: Natalie Laura Mering; June 11, 1988 (age 38); Santa Monica, California, U.S.
- Genres: Chamber pop; soft rock; psychedelic folk; noise; experimental rock
- Occupations: Singer; songwriter; musician
- Instruments: Vocals; guitar; bass guitar; keyboards
- Years active: 2003–present
- Labels: Not Not Fun; Mexican Summer; Sub Pop
- Formerly of: Jackie-O Motherfucker; Satanized
- Website: weyesblood.com

Natalie Laura Mering (born June 11, 1988), known professionally as Weyes Blood (formerly Weyes Bluhd; pronounced /waɪzblʌd/, like "wise blood"), is an American singer, songwriter, and musician.

She was primarily raised in Doylestown, Pennsylvania. She has been performing her own material under variations of the name Weyes Blood since 2003. Mering's career began with her early involvement in the underground noise music scene and tenure as a member bassist of the Portland, Oregon-based experimental rock group Jackie-O Motherfucker and singer for the band Satanized.

As Weyes Bluhd, she released several projects that explored softer pop and folk sounds, especially her debut studio record Strange Chalices of Seeing (2007), before adopting the alternate moniker Weyes Blood to release her sophomore release The Outside Room (2011) on micro-label Not Not Fun Records. She then signed a recording contract with independent label Mexican Summer, releasing The Innocents (2014) and Front Row Seat to Earth (2016). She released her next two studio albums, Titanic Rising (2019) and And in the Darkness, Hearts Aglow (2022), via Sub Pop.

== Life and career ==
=== 1988–2002: Early life ===
Natalie Laura Mering was born on June 11, 1988, in Santa Monica, California, into a deeply religious born-again Pentecostal Christian family.

Mering's family moved several times throughout her childhood; she spent her early life in Scotts Valley, California before they settled in Doylestown, Pennsylvania, in 1999, where she attended high school. Both her older brothers and parents are musicians and music played an important part in her upbringing. Her father, Sumner Mering, is a musician and guitarist who was in the Los Angeles new wave band Sumner in the late 1970s.

=== 2003–2015: Career beginnings and The Innocents ===
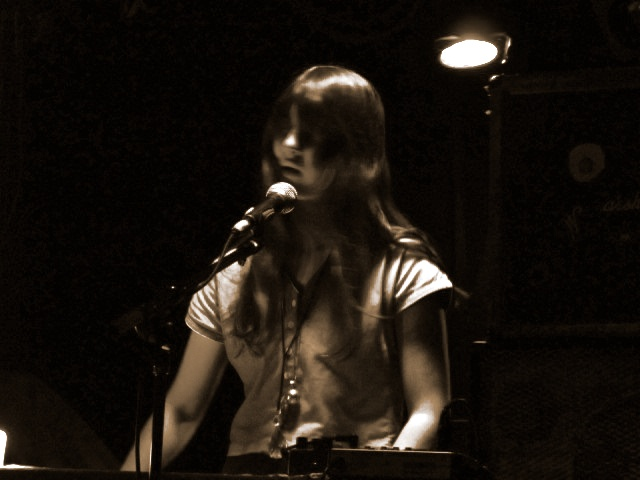
Mering performing in 2010

At the age of 15, Mering began using the moniker Wise Blood (a reference to the 1952 Flannery O'Connor novel) to write songs. She changed to Weyes Bluhd on several self-released records before changing the spelling to Weyes Blood. After finishing high school, Mering relocated to Portland, Oregon to attend Lewis & Clark College, where she majored in music and had a radio show on the campus radio station. However, Mering dropped out after her first year of studies. She subsequently began touring the underground music scene, performing as a bassist in the Portland-based band Jackie-O Motherfucker and playing keyboards and singing with noise rock band Satanized.

In 2011, she released her debut studio album The Outside Room as Weyes Blood and the Dark Juices on Not Not Fun Records. Uncut magazine described the album as "devotional and ethereal, but with an edge", while Beatbots found it "an impressive and ambitious album". Brett Abrahamsen later included the album on his "ten greatest albums of the 2010s" list. Mering released her second studio album in October 2014 called The Innocents, which was released through Mexican Summer. It was recorded in rural Pennsylvania, Mering's apartment and Gary's Electric Studio in Greenpoint, Brooklyn. It included contributions by Jacob Brunner (drums) and James Strong (bass). Mering described the theme of the album as being "about my first real relationship that went really awry." The Innocents received critical acclaim, Stephen M. Deusner of Pitchfork writing that "These finely wrought songs introduce a fascinating and confidently subversive artist and offers a glimpse of the road she's traveling." Following The Innocents, Mering also released a four-song EP titled Cardamom Times on October 9, 2015, which was acclaimed for its atmospheric quality and Mering's vocal performance.

=== 2016–2021: Front Row Seat to Earth and Titanic Rising ===
After the release of these projects, Mering relocated from New York to Los Angeles, California. She commented: "I was in New York alone: no friends, no money, no record deal at the time. Literally I had nothing." In 2016, Mering's profile was raised significantly when she released her critically acclaimed third studio album Front Row Seat to Earth, on Mexican Summer and toured throughout Europe and the States. NPR wrote that the album re-examines "intimacy and idealism in ways that showcase Mering's gift for measuring and mediating heady emotions." Mering stated the songs on the album were largely inspired by the isolation she felt while living in New York.

On February 12, 2019, a new studio album was announced and available to pre-order on her website, along with dates of her upcoming tour. The album Titanic Rising was released by Sub Pop, on April 5, 2019, and received universal critical acclaim. Mering described Titanic Rising as "The Kinks meet WWII or Bob Seger meets Enya." Titanic Rising was described as a record about romantic disappointment, damaged reality, and finding hope.

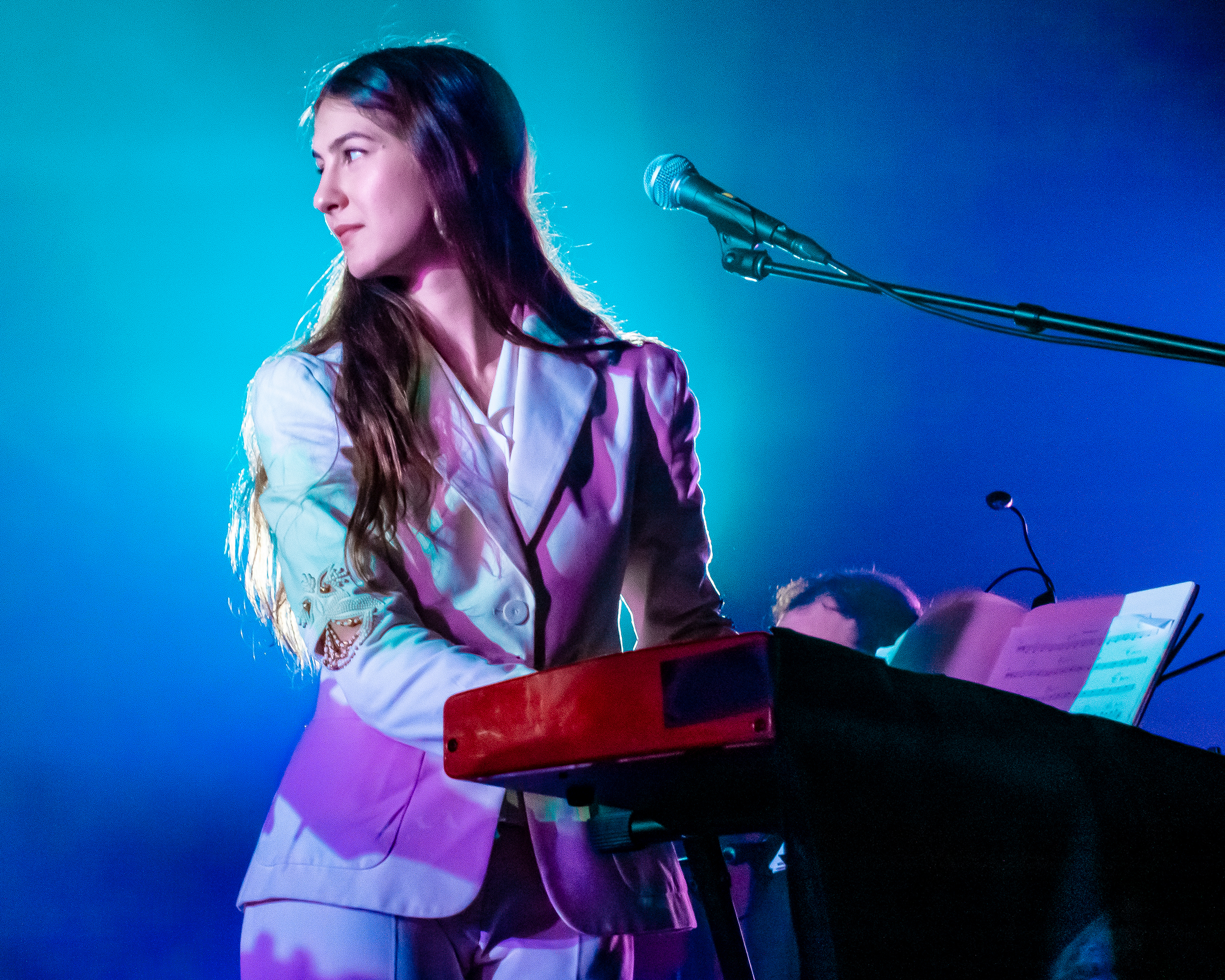
Weyes Blood performing in Los Angeles, 2019

The Titanic Rising album cover art was shot by underwater photographer Brett Stanley. His team, and a set designer, built an underwater teenage bedroom in a pool in Long Beach, California. In a two hour photoshoot session, before the set was destroyed by water, Stanley visually presented a life submerged in water and Mering rising above it. Mering described an adolescent's bedroom as a symbolic "subconscious altar", influenced by western culture. "The bedroom is an archetype. To me it stands for a lot of the silliness of our modern culture where the kind of things that we worship in our sacred spaces are based on media and movies because we don't really have much else in the way of myths, if that makes sense." The bedroom set's walls featured a series of posters—notably of her father, and Lou Reed. Mering was originally inspired by friend and artist Ariana Popedum-Metropolis, who gave her the concept of a bedroom album cover. Mering had researched old childhood bedrooms from the 1990s, and wall collage art. She was also influenced by the band The Magnetic Fields, and their use of a bedroom stage set.

The music video for her song "Movies", starred a Hollywood starlet looking at herself in the mirror, while underwater. "I experience movies, as these dark, psychological manipulations or something. My relationship to them is maybe a little more intense than most people." Later, Mering released a music video for her 2019 hit song "Andromeda" on April 16, 2024, five years after the initial album release of Titanic Rising. The album received high placements on the 2019 year-end and decade-end lists from publications such as Pitchfork, Uproxx, Paste, Uncut, Dazed, The Guardian, and NPR.

On July 16, 2019, Mering had her television debut on Late Night with Seth Meyers, where she performed her single "Everyday" from Titanic Rising. Live performance highlights include sold-out tours in the US and Europe, as well as opening for Kacey Musgraves in the fall of 2019 and singing with Lana Del Rey at the Hollywood Bowl. On October 29, 2020, she helped canvass for the Democratic Socialists of America.

=== 2022–2025: And in the Darkness, Hearts Aglow ===
On September 12, 2022, Mering announced her fifth studio album And in the Darkness, Hearts Aglow and released her first single, "It's Not Just Me, It's Everybody" on the same day. The music video was inspired by Gene Kelly's Jerry the Mouse performance from the 1945 musical film Anchors Aweigh. Mering revealed that And in the Darkness, Hearts Aglow was the second chapter in a trilogy of records that began with Titanic Rising in 2019 and introduced the album as a statement on the current state of the world, and the effects of capitalism, social media, and the rise of technology. "I think there's a hyper-isolation situation going on where technology has created this environment where people are expected to be completely self-sustainable and not interdependent on other people." The album's second single, "Grapevine", followed and was released on October 11, 2022. The song was named after the Californian Ridge Route highway, and was inspired by a personal break–up from a "narcissistic" musician.

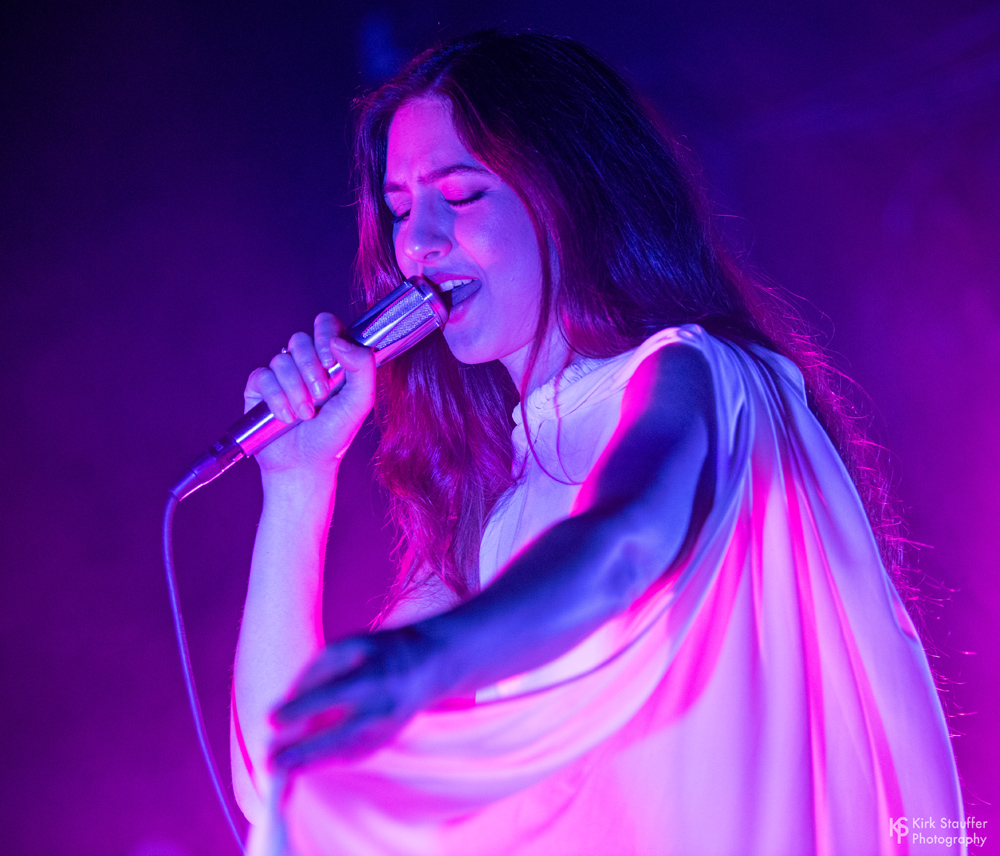
Weyes Blood performing at the Showbox in Seattle, 2023

On November 18, 2022, the album And in the Darkness, Hearts Aglow was released and received critical acclaim, aggregating a weighted average score of 88 on Metacritic based on 24 critic reviews and appearing on numerous year-end lists. The album's cover art was photographed by Neil Krug. Mering described the album as "Blade Runner meets Pride and Prejudice." Musically, she was inspired by the late British-American artist Scott Walker, and his series of 1960s innovative albums—in particular, Scott 3, and Scott 4.

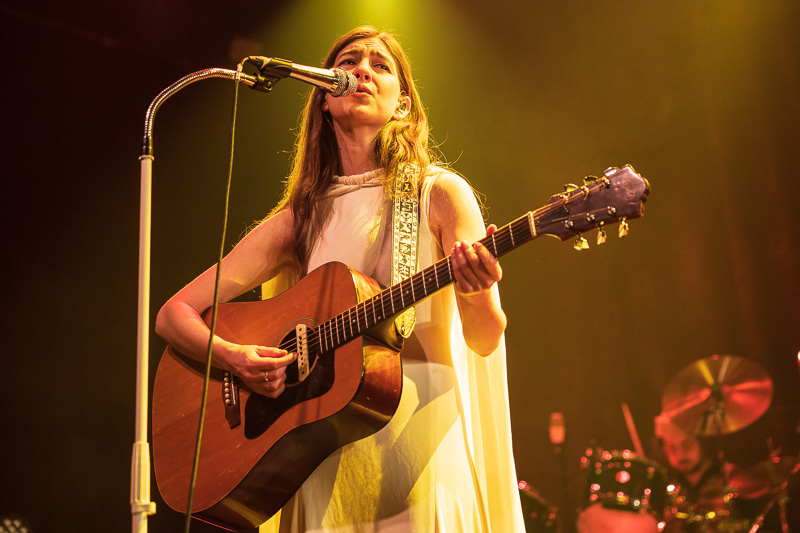
Mering performing at Rockefeller, Oslo, 2023

In 2023, Mering embarked on the In Holy Flux Tour, a promotional tour for the album, where she traveled across North America and Europe. Mering performed at Coachella 2023, on the Park Stage at the 2023 Glastonbury Festival, and at the 2023 Fuji Rock Festival. The music video "God Turn Me Into a Flower" was a featured video on her tour, and was a retelling on the myth of Narcissus. The music video was directed by Adam Curtis. The music video for the song "Hearts Aglow" was directed by Neelam Khan Vela, and showcased as a visual collage of the tour, summarizing key moments.

=== 2026–present: Upcoming 7th album ===
Mering took to Instagram on April 21, 2026, to share a number of pictures of herself working in the studio and teased new music with the caption "If you have been wondering...I HAVE been in the studio... this one's taking an extra minute to cook because it's extra delicious. I hope you're hungry." On September 8, Mering headlined her first concert at Royal Albert Hall alongside the Jules Buckley Orchestra where she debuted two new songs.

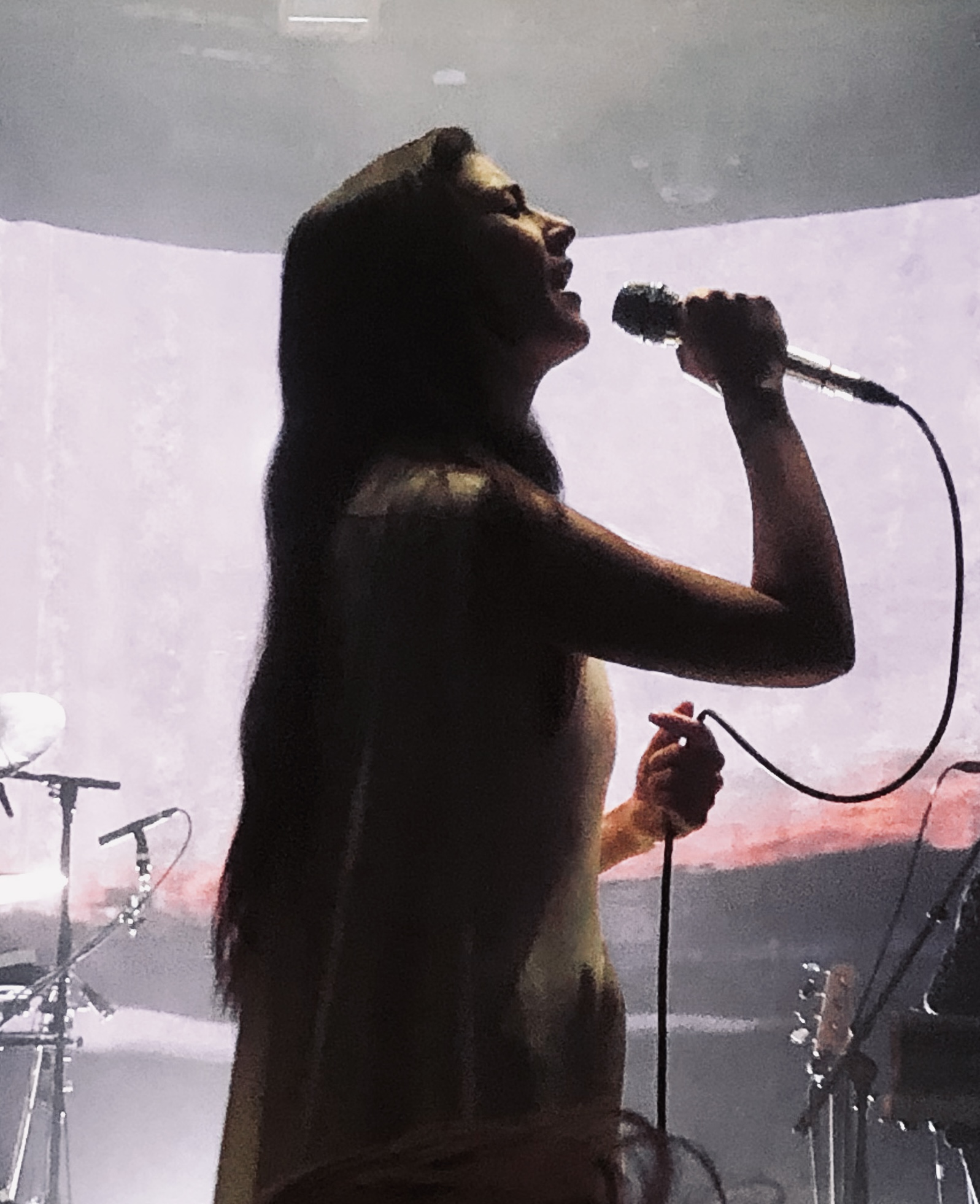
Weyes Blood performing in Stockholm, Sweden on January 30, 2023.

== Collaborations ==
Mering collaborated with Drugdealer for his 2016 album The End of Comedy. She featured on his songs "Suddenly" and "The End of Comedy", appearing among other guest artists on the album. Mering was also heavily involved Tim Heidecker's 2020 concept album Fear of Death, singing on all twelve tracks, co-writing two, and receiving a co-producer credit.

In 2021, Mering and Zella Day released the topical song "Holocene". Day told Rolling Stone, "My hope is that 'Holocene' reminds people that the world is much bigger than ourselves. I've never lived through a world war but I imagine that what we are dealing with is comparable suffering on the global scale. This song poses the question of how we as the individual can move forward as well as how the world is going to begin healing. Time will and always does tell."

Mering received wider attention when she featured, along with Zella Day, on the closing track of Lana Del Rey's 2021 studio album Chemtrails over the Country Club, a cover version of Joni Mitchell's "For Free". Previously, in 2019, they performed the song in concert as an a capella trio. Del Rey has described Day and Mering as, "Some of the most talented singers in L.A., and maybe the world." For Del Rey's album, Mering was involved in the photoshoot by Neil Krug, dressed in an all black western attire.

Mering has toured and collaborated with Caroline Polachek. In 2022, Mering made a guest appearance serving coffee to Polachek in the music video for her song "Welcome to My Island". On February 7, 2024, they released an alternative remix version of Polachek's song "Butterfly Net", from her 2023 album Desire, I Want to Turn Into You. The song appeared on the 'Everasking Edition' of the album.

In 2025, Mering reunited with Drugdealer by realising a new single and music video Real Thing, her first collaboration with the L.A. based artist after six years.

Mering also performed background vocals for the soundtrack of the 2025 comedy-drama film Marty Supreme.

== Musical style and influences ==
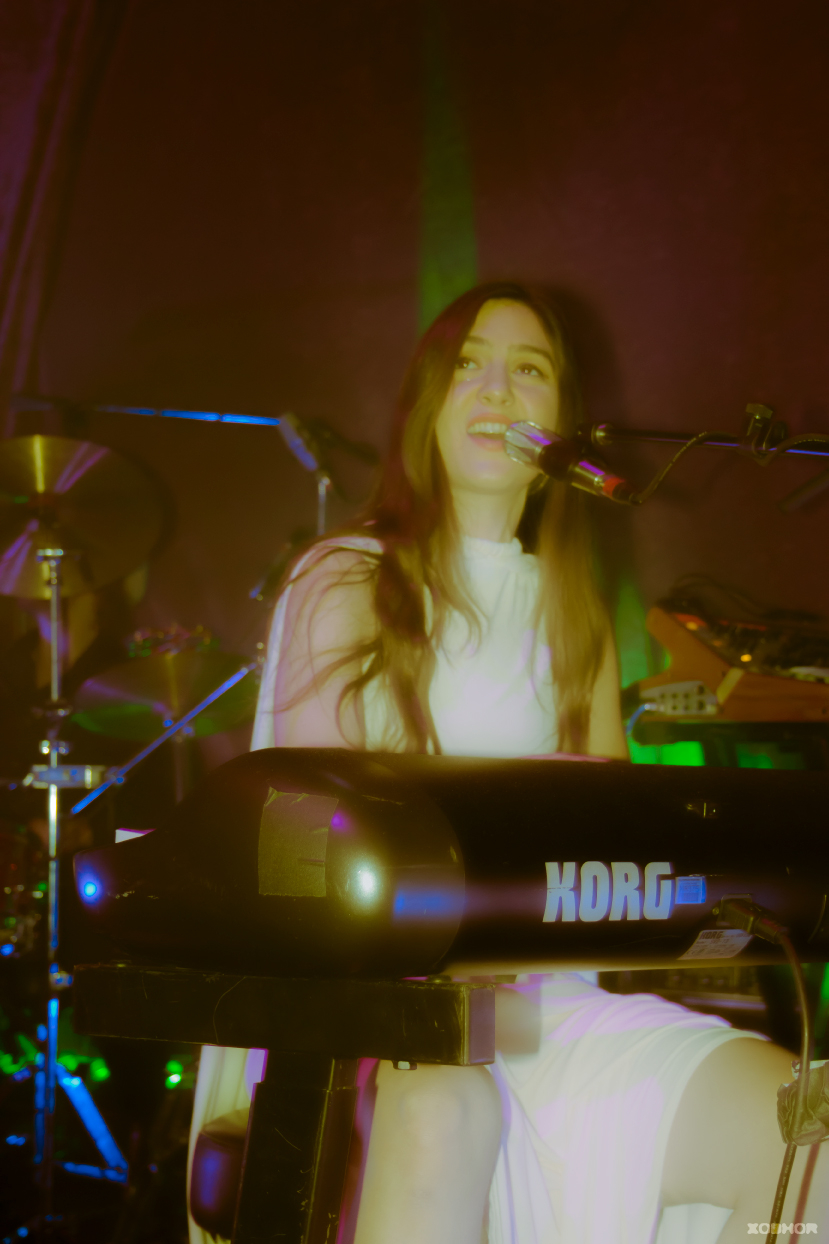
Mering's music has touched on a wide range of topics, including climate change.

Mering's musical style has been labelled as chamber pop, psychedelic folk, soft rock, noise and experimental rock.

Mering has stated that church music, which figured prominently in her upbringing, has been an influence on her song-writing. "Most of the great classical music and early music of our time is written for God in a sacred space," she said. "So sacred music and sacred space music—that was my favorite thing about music. Not so much content-wise. Not so much the theory and concept of God, but just the idea that we've built this gigantic, stone cathedral palace for people to sing in. ... When I record, I think about sacred space and I think about what would be the sound of your soul if there is music coming out of it. It would probably be an echoey, strange chamber."

In a 2019 interview with Nardwuar, Mering revealed that she is also influenced by the Velvet Underground, Wolf Eyes, and experimental artist Inca Ore. Mering states in the same interview, that earlier on in her career while making experimental music, people likened her songs to horror film soundtracks. She began to listen to and be influenced by film soundtracks, such as Jaws (1975) and The Wizard of Oz (1939).

Mering is highly influenced by the late singer-songwriter Harry Nilsson, in both singing style and song-writing. Mering has also been influenced by Joni Mitchell, Nico, and Judee Sill. She holds Mitchell in the highest regard and named Hejira as her favorite album.

In a 2022 interview with the Quietus, Mering listed thirteen albums that are influential to her: Alice Coltrane's Universal Consciousness, Ween's Quebec, Stevie Wonder's Talking Book, XTC's English Settlement, Vangelis's Opéra sauvage, the Roches's Speak, Joni Mitchell's Hejira, Cocteau Twins's Treasure, Syd Barrett's The Madcap Laughs, Robert Wyatt's Rock Bottom, Lou Reed's The Bells, John Cale's Paris 1919, Can's Monster Movie.

== Discography ==
=== Studio albums ===
List of studio albums, with selected information
| Title | Details | Peak chart positions | | | | | | | | | |
| Title | Details | US | US Heat | US Indie | GER | NLD | NZ | SCO | UK | UK Indie | UK Amer. |
|---|---|---|---|---|---|---|---|---|---|---|---|
| Strange Chalices of Seeing | Released: 2007; Label: Self-released; Format: CD-R | — | — | — | — | — | — | — | — | — | — |
| The Outside Room | Released: May 10, 2011; Label: Not Not Fun; Format: LP, cassette, digital download | — | — | — | — | — | — | — | — | — | — |
| The Innocents | Released: October 21, 2014; Label: Mexican Summer; Format: LP, CD, digital download | — | — | — | — | — | — | — | — | — | — |
| Front Row Seat to Earth | Released: October 21, 2016; Label: Mexican Summer; Format: LP, CD, digital download | — | 23 | — | — | — | — | — | — | — (Note: Front Row Seat to Earth did not enter the UK Independent Albums Chart but peaked at number 14 on the UK Independent Album Breakers chart.) | — |
| Titanic Rising | Released: April 5, 2019; Label: Sub Pop; Format: LP, CD, cassette, digital download | — (Note: Titanic Rising did not enter the Billboard 200, but peaked at number 34 on the Top Album Sales chart.) | 3 | 6 | — | — | — | 20 | 68 | 7 | 1 |
| And in the Darkness, Hearts Aglow | Released: November 18, 2022; Label: Sub Pop; Format: LP, CD, cassette, digital download | 111 | 1 | 18 | 68 | 76 | 30 | 14 | 27 | 2 | 2 |
"—" denotes a recording that did not chart or was not released in that territory.

=== Extended plays ===
List of extended plays, with selected information
| Title | Details | Peak chart positions |
| Title | Details | UK Vinyl |
|---|---|---|
| Angels in America / Weyes Blood Split | Released: August 15, 2011; Label: Northern Spy; Format: LP, digital download | — |
| Cardamom Times | Released: October 19, 2015; Label: Mexican Summer; Format: LP, digital download | 3 |
| Myths 002 (alongside Ariel Pink) | Released: January 27, 2017; Label: Mexican Summer; Format: LP, digital download | — |
| Rough Trade Session | Released: October 22, 2019; Label: Sub Pop; Format: LP, digital download | 23 |
"—" denotes a recording that did not chart or was not released in that territory.

=== Soundtrack ===
| Year | Title | Role | Notes |
|---|---|---|---|
| 2022 | Cursed Films | Original score composer | Season 2 |
| 2022 | Minions: The Rise of Gru | "You're No Good" | |
| 2025 | Marty Supreme | Additional vocals | |

=== Singles ===
==== As lead artist ====
List of singles, showing year released and album name
| Title | Year | Peak chart positions | Album |
| Title | Year | US AAA | Album |
|---|---|---|---|
| "Some Winters" | 2014 | — | The Innocents |
| "Cardamom" | 2015 | — | Cardamom Times |
| "Seven Words" | 2016 | — | Front Row Seat to Earth |
| "Do You Need My Love" | 2016 | — | Front Row Seat to Earth |
| "Generation Why" | 2016 | — | Front Row Seat to Earth |
| "Tears on Fire" (with Ariel Pink) | 2017 | — | Myths 002 |
| "Andromeda" | 2019 | — | Titanic Rising |
| "Everyday" | 2019 | — | Titanic Rising |
| "Movies" | 2019 | — | Titanic Rising |
| "It's Not Just Me, It's Everybody" | 2022 | — | And in the Darkness, Hearts Aglow |
| "Grapevine" | 2022 | 32 | And in the Darkness, Hearts Aglow |
| "God Turn Me into a Flower" | 2022 | — | And in the Darkness, Hearts Aglow |
| "Children of the Empire" | 2023 | 38 | And in the Darkness, Hearts Aglow |
"—" denotes a release that did not chart or was not issued in that region.

==== As featured artist ====
List of singles, showing year released and album name
| Title | Year | Album |
|---|---|---|
| "My God" (The Killers featuring Weyes Blood) | 2020 | Imploding the Mirage: Deluxe |
| "Oh How We Drift Away" (Tim Heidecker featuring Weyes Blood) | 2020 | Fear of Death |
| "Holocene" (Zella Day featuring Weyes Blood) | 2021 | Non-album single |
| "Butterfly Net" (Caroline Polachek featuring Weyes Blood) | 2024 | Desire, I Want to Turn Into You: Everasking Edition |
| "Real Thing" (Drugdealer featuring Weyes Blood) | 2025 | Non-album single |

==== Promotional singles ====
List of promotional singles, showing year released and album name
| Title | Year | Album |
|---|---|---|
| "A Certain Kind"/"Everybody's Talkin'" | 2017 | A Certain Kind b/w Everybody's Talkin |
| "Titanic Risen" (Note: This song only appears on the Japanese edition of Titanic Rising.) | 2021 | Titanic Rising |

=== Music videos ===
List of music videos, showing year released and directors
| Title | Year | Director(s) | Ref. |
|---|---|---|---|
| "Candy Boy" | 2010 | Unknown | |
| "Some Winters" | 2014 | Winston H Case | |
| "Bad Magic" | 2015 | Joey Frank | |
| "In the Beginning" | 2015 | Kai Davey-Bellin and Laura-Lynn Petrick | |
| "Seven Words" | 2016 | Charlotte Linden Ercoli Coe | |
| "Do You Need My Love?" | 2016 | Natalie Mering | |
| "Serpent Society" | 2016 | Natalie Mering | |
| "Used to Be" | 2016 | Laura-Lynn Petrick | |
| "Tears on Fire" (with Ariel Pink) | 2017 | Charlotte Linden Ercoli Coe | |
| "Everyday" | 2019 | Natalie Mering | |
| "Movies" | 2019 | Natalie Mering | |
| "Wild Time" | 2020 | Natalie Mering | |
| "It's Not Just Me, It's Everybody" | 2022 | Charlotte Ercoli | |
| "Grapevine" | 2022 | Rick Farin and Claire Farin | |
| "Hearts Aglow" | 2023 | Neelam Khan Vela | |
| "Twin Flame" | 2023 | Ambar Navarro | |
| "God Turn Me into a Flower" | 2023 | Adam Curtis | |
| "A Given Thing" | 2024 | Joey Frank | |
| "Andromeda" | 2024 | Natalie Mering, Ambar Navarro, and Colton Stock | |

=== Guest appearances ===
List of non-single guest appearances, with other performing artists, showing year released and album name
| Title | Year | Other artist(s) | Album |
|---|---|---|---|
| "Jesse's Party" | 2008 | Raw Thrills | Together Again |
| "I Lost Something in the Hills" | 2008 | Raw Thrills | Drugs |
| "Where" | 2011 | Raw Thrills | So Post |
| "One Side Art" | 2013 | Raw Thrills | Essential Thrills |
| "Early Birds of Babylon" | 2012 | Ariel Pink's Haunted Graffiti | Mature Themes |
| "The Chat" | 2015 | Mild High Club | Timeline |
| "Suddenly" | 2017 | Drugdealer | The End of Comedy |
| "The End of Comedy" | 2017 | Drugdealer | The End of Comedy |
| "Sides" | 2017 | Perfume Genius | No Shape |
| "Friend of Lindy Morrison" | 2017 | Kirin J. Callinan | Bravado |
| "Runnin' Outta Luck" | 2017 | Alex Cameron | Forced Witness |
| "Politics of Love" | 2017 | Alex Cameron | Forced Witness |
| "Blessed Be the Meek (Let Me Be)" | 2018 | Raw Thrills | Mondo Combo |
| "God's Favorite Customer" | 2018 | Father John Misty | God's Favorite Customer |
| "Grey Area" | 2018 | Jerry Paper | Like a Baby |
| "Honey" | 2019 | Drugdealer | Raw Honey |
| "Fear of Death" (and entire album) | 2020 | Tim Heidecker | Fear of Death |
| "My God" | 2020 | The Killers | Imploding the Mirage |
| "For Free" (Joni Mitchell cover) | 2021 | Lana Del Rey and Zella Day | Chemtrails over the Country Club |
| "Story of Blood" | 2022 | John Cale | Mercy |
| "Begged" | 2026 | Olivia Rodrigo | You Seem Pretty Sad for a Girl So in Love |

== Tours ==
Headlining

- True Love is Making a Comeback Tour (2019)
- Something to Believe Tour (2019-2020)
- In Holy Flux Tour (2022–2023)

Supporting

- Father John Misty – Pure Comedy Tour (2017)
- Beck and Phoenix – Summer Odyssey Tour (2023)

== Awards and nominations ==
| Year | Organisation | Award | Work | Result | Ref. |
|---|---|---|---|---|---|
| 2020 | Libera Awards | Best Indie Rock Album | Titanic Rising | Won | |
| 2023 | Libera Awards | Best Singer-Songwriter Album | And in the Darkness, Hearts Aglow | Won | |
