= Ben Babbitt =

Los Angeles-based artist and musician

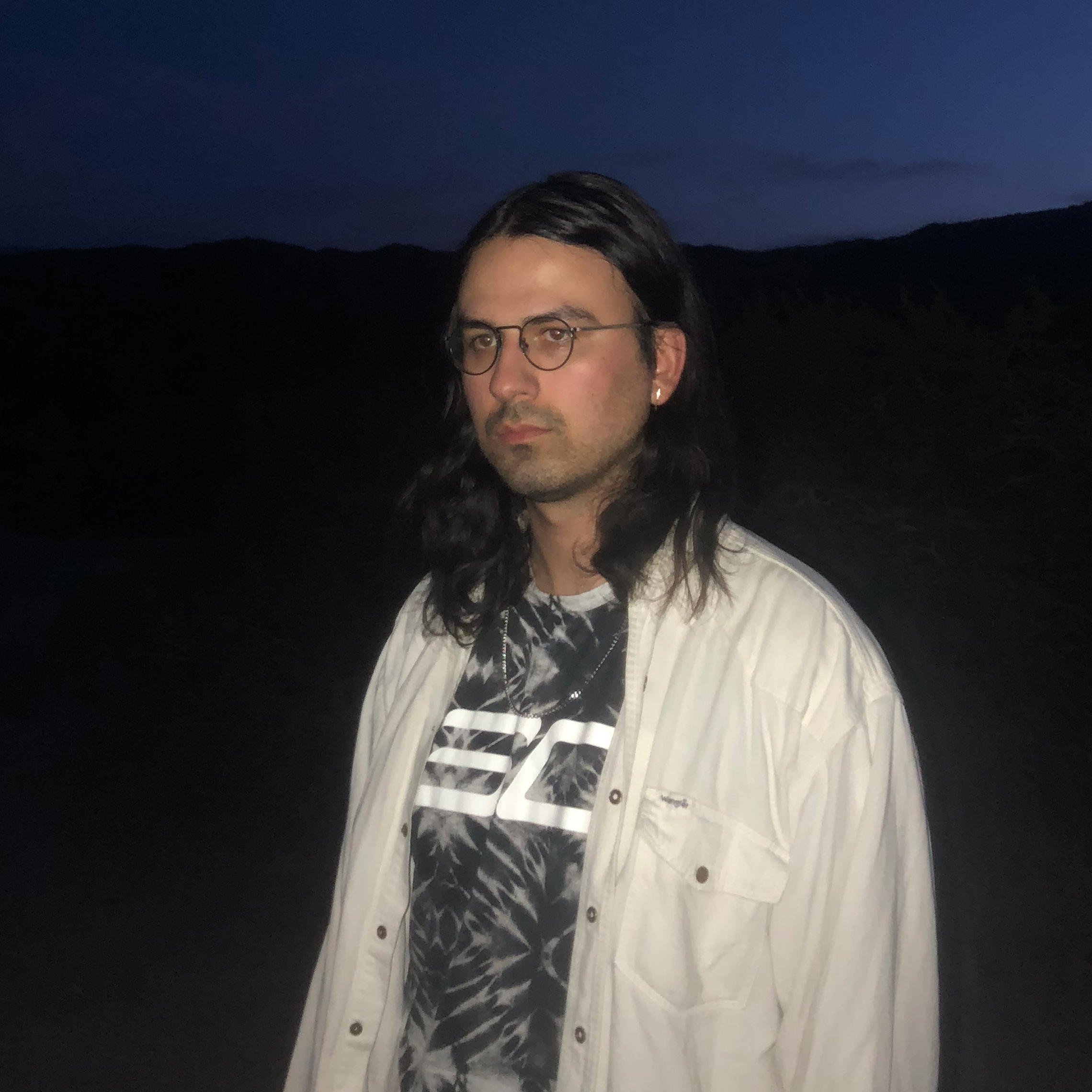
- Babbitt in 2019
- Born: Evanston, Illinois, U.S.
- Education: School of the Art Institute of Chicago
- Known for: Atmospheric music
- Notable work: Kentucky Route Zero
- Musical career
- Genres: Electronic; soundtrack; experimental
- Occupations: Composer; sound designer; musician; record producer

Ben Babbitt is a Los Angeles–based artist and musician for independent films and video games. He is a founding member of the video game development studio Cardboard Computer, where he wrote the soundtrack for Kentucky Route Zero.

== Career ==
Babbitt has been making music since a very young age, and comes from a musical family with both parents playing in orchestras in Chicago.

Since 2011, he has been a member of the band Pillars & Tongues with Mark Trecka and Elizabeth Remis, and contributed to their 2013 album 'End-Dances', numerous small-edition tape releases, in addition to touring extensively throughout the U.S., Canada, and Europe. Babbitt has exhibited work with Cardboard Computer at the V&A Museum in London, the Art Institute of Chicago, the Museum of Moving Image in New York City, and the Museum of Pop Culture in Seattle, as well as the Getty Museum, in Los Angeles, and the Field Museum in Chicago.

In 2019, Babbitt collaborated with Angel Olsen on her album All Mirrors, providing most of its string arrangements, and playing multiple instruments on the album.

== Discography ==
=== Albums ===
- Static Between Stations (2016), as Junebug.
- Wilderness Withdrawal (2018), quadraphonic live performance

=== Soundtracks ===
- Coureur des Bois (2013), video game by Tamas Kemenczy for LA Game Space
- Neighbor (2016), video game by Cardboard Computer, part of the Triennale Game Collection
- Paris Window (2019), feature film by Amanda Kramer
- Kentucky Route Zero (2020), video game by Cardboard Computer
- The African Desperate (2022), feature film by Martine Syms

=== Appearances ===
- End-Dances (2013), album by Pillars & Tongues
- An Index (2017), tape by Pillars & Tongues
- the Anteroom (2018), album by How to Dress Well
- Cross Record (2019), album by Cross Record
- All Mirrors (2019), album by Angel Olsen
- I Hate it Here (2021), tape with Steph Kretowicz & felicita
- And in the Darkness, Hearts Aglow (2022), album by Weyes Blood
