= Titanic Rising =

Studio album by Weyes Blood
- Released: April 5, 2019
- Recorded: 2018–2019
- Genres: Chamber pop; soft rock; baroque pop
- Length: 42:22
- Label: Sub Pop
- Producers: Jonathan Rado; Natalie Mering (Note: Except "Mirror Forever", produced by Rado, Mering and Brian D'Addario.)

Weyes Blood chronology
Front Row Seat to Earth (2016)	Titanic Rising (2019)	And in the Darkness, Hearts Aglow (2022)

Singles from Titanic Rising
- 1. "Andromeda" Released: January 17, 2019; 2. "Everyday" Released: February 12, 2019; 3. "Movies" Released: March 19, 2019

Titanic Rising is the fifth studio album by American singer-songwriter and musician Weyes Blood, released on April 5, 2019, by Sub Pop. Produced by the artist along with Jonathan Rado, it is influenced by 1970s FM radio. Its lyrical themes address romantic pursuits, climate change, and references to the Titanic.

The album was preceded by the release of three singles including "Andromeda", released on January 17, 2019, which was included in various year-end lists. "Everyday" and "Movies" were released as the second and third single, respectively. The album received universal acclaim from music critics, with praise going towards its powerful ambience and vulnerable lyrics. It earned the singer her first appearance on the UK Albums Chart, and additionally charted on the U.S. Top Album Sales chart and reached the top 20 in Scotland.

== Background ==
Weyes Blood's fourth studio album, Front Row Seat to Earth, was released by the independent record label Mexican Summer on October 21, 2016. She wrote the entirety of the album herself and produced it with Chris Cohen.

After Front Row Seat to Earth, Weyes Blood signed with the Sub Pop record label in 2017.

== Development ==
=== Writing ===
Weyes Blood used her history in Christianity as a key concept on Titanic Rising. She considers herself a fallen Christian, which is a recurring theme in the album, specifically on the tracks "A Lot's Gonna Change" and "Mirror Forever". She focused on writing lyrics about income disparity and climate change as she thinks they are fundamental to Western civilization. She was inspired by the 2006 documentary film An Inconvenient Truth, which discusses climate change; she said the film "rocked [her] fucking boat so hard", thinking that things in the world would not be the same due to climate change. She was inspired by singers such as Hoagy Carmichael, Judy Garland, Frank Sinatra, and Enya, the rock band the Kinks, the surrealism movement, and films from the 1990s. She cited Enya's "feminine" music and her use of vocal layers as "[leaking] into [her] music secretly on the side". She was also influenced by pop music from the 1960s; she believes that the chord changes and meaningful lyrics are not present in modern pop music.

Titanic Rising was written in the perspective of writing to a past self. Weyes Blood did this so that she could "reconcile some of the trauma" of growing up believing things in the world would remain stable. She cited the instability of the climate, survivability, and children's quality of life as "[playing] a role in how you cope with reality". She has described the album as "forging [her] own path"; because of the success with her previous album, she was able to have a lot of control over Titanic Rising.

Following the release of Front Row Seat to Earth, Natalie Mering signed with Sub Pop in 2017. Titanic Rising was recorded in 2018 over a three-month period at Sonora Studios in Los Angeles and was produced by Jonathan Rado. The album is named after the RMS Titanic and the 1997 film based on the ship's sinking, which had a profound impact on Mering when she was younger.

== Composition ==
Titanic Rising incorporates with recurring themes of climate change, natural resources depleting, and the difficulty of having a real connection with people.

The album's music pairs inspiration from 1970s FM radio with more expansive sounds, and has been described as soft rock with influences from artists such as Joni Mitchell and the Carpenters, as well as chamber pop and baroque pop.

The opening track "A Lot's Gonna Change", a song that Mering described as setting the overall theme of Titanic Rising, deals with the yearning for a return to the simpler times of childhood, as well as learning how to cope with changes without being bogged down with hopelessness. "Andromeda", inspired by the galaxy and the mythological figure of the same name, deals with finding love in a world of distractions and past disappointments and features a LinnDrum. "Everyday" has an upbeat melody and lyrics about the struggles of online dating. Climate change is also a central theme of the album, with the Titanic used as a metaphor for this.

Mering described the title track, an instrumental, as an interlude between the album's first half, which deals with hope and love, and the second half, which deals with "an existential sub-zone." "Movies" features synth arpeggios in the first half before giving way to strings. Lyrically, the song deals with Mering's disillusionment with movies as a teenager and how she felt they lied to her. "Picture Me Better" is about a friend that committed suicide while Mering was making the album, while the finale track on the album, "Nearer to Thee", is a reference to the alleged final song the band on the RMS Titanic played before the ship sank.

== Visuals and artwork ==
The album cover features Mering submerged in an underwater bedroom. The cover was photographed by Brett Stanley in a Long Beach, California pool. Commenting on the cover's meaning, Mering stated that she thought of water as symbolizing the subconscious, and that a bedroom lives in this subconscious space due to its role as "a safe [..] and imaginative space" that shapes people's beliefs and identities.

== Release ==
Titanic Rising's lead single, "Andromeda", was released on January 17, 2019, as her first original solo release since Front Row Seat to Earth. Titanic Rising, its release date, track list, and artwork was announced alongside the release of its second single, "Everyday", on February 12, 2019. The single was also accompanied by a self-directed music video. She also announced the True Love Is Making a Comeback Tour on the same day, which began on April 1 and ended on June 13; it passed through North America and Europe. On February 17, she performed the album track "Something to Believe" at Midwinter, a Chicago music festival. The album's third and final single, "Movies" was released on March 19, alongside another self-directed music video. On May 20, she announced a second tour, the Something to Believe Tour, which began on August 7 and concluded on October 6, passing through the United States.

On May 27, 2020, the "Wild Time" music video was released. The Japanese bonus track, "Titanic Risen", was released in January 2021 exclusively on Roblox's sinking ship simulator, and on April 4, the track was released on streaming services after the Roblox Titanic room was sunk.

== Critical reception ==
Professional ratings
Aggregate scores
Source	Rating
AnyDecentMusic?	8.4/10
Metacritic	91/100
Review scores
Source	Rating
AllMusic	5/5 stars
The A.V. Club	A−
The Independent	5/5 stars
Mojo	5/5 stars
NME	4/5 stars
The Observer	4/5 stars
Pitchfork	8.5/10
Q	4/5 stars
Rolling Stone	4/5 stars
Uncut	9/10

Titanic Rising received widespread acclaim from contemporary music critics. At Metacritic, which assigns a normalized rating out of 100 to reviews from mainstream critics, the album has an average score of 91 based on 26 reviews, indicating "universal acclaim".

AllMusic praised the record, stating that "she underscores enormously orchestrated pop songs with eerie experimental ambience, imagining a dreamworld where Joni Mitchell's late-'70s output was produced by Brian Eno." Quinn Moreland, writing for Pitchfork, described the album as "a grand, sentimental ode to living and loving in the shadow of doom" and "her most ambitious and complex work yet". Dazed Digital stated that, "pairing a rich, 70s soft-rock palette with rippling undercurrents of dread, it already feels like one of the year's best records, and a poignant document on what it feels like to inhabit this particular moment in time."

Year-end lists
Publication	Accolade	Rank	Ref.
AllMusic	AllMusic Best of 2019	1	
The A.V. Club	The 20 Best Albums of 2019	5	
Consequence of Sound	Top 50 Albums of 2019	26	
Dazed	The 20 Best Albums of 2019	4	
The Guardian	The 50 Best Albums of 2019	10	
NME	The 50 Best Albums of 2019	9	
NPR	The 25 Best Albums of 2019	14	
Paste	The 50 Best Albums of 2019	1	
Pitchfork	The 50 Best Albums of 2019	9	
PopMatters	The 70 Best Albums of 2019	38	
Slant	The 25 Best Albums of 2019	18	
Stereogum	The 50 Best Albums of 2019	17	
Treble Zine	The Top 50 Albums of 2019	11	
Uproxx	The Best Albums of 2019	4	
Vice	The 100 Best Albums of 2019	20	

Decade-end lists
Publication	Accolade	Rank	Ref.
AllMusic	AllMusic Best Albums of the 2010s	—N/a	
Pitchfork	The 200 Best Albums of the 2010s	143	
The A.V. Club	The 50 Best Albums of the 2010s	37	

== Track listing ==
All tracks are written by Natalie Mering (Weyes Blood).

No.	Title	Length
1.	"A Lot's Gonna Change"	4:21
2.	"Andromeda"	4:40
3.	"Everyday"	5:07
4.	"Something to Believe"	4:45
5.	"Titanic Rising"	1:36
6.	"Movies"	5:53
7.	"Mirror Forever"	5:05
8.	"Wild Time"	6:09
9.	"Picture Me Better"	3:41
10.	"Nearer to Thee"	1:05
Total length:		42:22

Titanic Rising – Japanese edition (bonus track)
No.	Title	Length
11.	"Titanic Risen"	4:28
Total length:		46:50

== Personnel ==
Credits adapted from liner notes.

Musicians

- Michael D'Addario (1, 3, 7)
- Brian D'Addario (1, 3, 4, 7, 8)
- Michael Long (1, 3, 4, 7, 8)
- Richard Dodd (1–4, 6–10)
- Leah Katz (1–4, 6–10)
- Daphne Chen (1–4, 6–10)
- Eric Gorfain (1–4, 6–10)
- Drew Erickson (1–4, 6–9)
- Jonathan Rado (2, 5)
- Blake Mills (2, 8)
- Chris Cohen (4, 8)
- Keith Karman (6)
- Walt McClements (9)
- Kenny Gilmore (4, and 8)
- Michael Chadwick (6, 9)

Technical personnel

- Kenny Gilmore – mixing
- Dave Cerminara – engineering
- Sarah Tudzin – additional engineering
- Tristan Rodman – additional engineering
- Drew Erickson – arranger
- Brian D'Addario – arranger (1 and 10)

Artwork

- Brett Stanley – photography, set builds
- Jenny Baumert – assistance
- Ryan Waller – assistance
- Elijah Funk – layout

== Charts ==
Chart performance for Titanic Rising
Chart (2019)	Peak position
Australian Digital Albums (ARIA)	37
Belgian Albums (Ultratop Flanders)	139
French Albums (SNEP)	113
Scottish Albums (Official Charts)	20
UK Albums (Official Charts)	68
US Top Album Sales (Billboard)	34
US Top Alternative Albums (Billboard)	6
US Heatseekers Albums (Billboard)	3

== See also ==
- Titanic in popular culture
- Climate change in music
