= Manila Wrestling Federation =

Professional wrestling promotion in the Philippines

- MWF logo 2023
- Acronym: MWF
- Founded: 2014
- Defunct: 2024
- Style: Professional wrestling
- Headquarters: Quezon City, Philippines
- Founders: Fabio Makisig; Mr. Lucha; Robin Sane; Tarek El Tayech; Veronica Shannon; William Manzano
- Website: manilawrestling.com

Manila Wrestling Federation (MWF) was an independent professional wrestling promotion based in the Philippines. MWF was founded in late 2014, and relaunched in 2018. It shut down on May 25, 2024.

MWF promotes itself as the home of "Aksyonovela" – a portmanteau of the Filipino word for "action" and the suffix of telenovela – representing the mix of athletic wrestling action and timely, relatable storytelling that the promotion presents.

== History ==
MWF's beginnings came on the heels of another Philippine pro wrestling promotion, Philippine Wrestling Revolution (PWR). Some of MWF's founders – like Mike Shannon, Robin Sane, Mr. Lucha, Tarek El Tayech, and William Elvin – had worked with PWR, but internal issues led to their departure from that company in late 2014. They then started laying the foundations of MWF along with co-founder Tala Haliya, recruited wrestlers and talents, and started wrestling training.

MWF informally launched at History Channel's HistoryCon event in August 2016, staging wrestling matches across three days of the convention. MWF wrestlers were joined by wrestlers from Singapore Pro Wrestling (SPW), like The Eurasian Dragon, "The Statement" Andruew Tang, Alexis Lee, and The Thaibarrian.

In April 2017, MWF produced its debut show, MWF Live, at the Makati Square Arena. After 4 more shows, MWF did a relaunch of its product in February 2018 at MWF Open House: Level UP, at the University of the Philippines Diliman.

Starting MWF 1: Kasaysayan, all of MWF's shows are numbered sequentially.

MWF also produces an online weekly wrestling show, Aksyonovela TV, on its YouTube channel. Its first episode aired on October 23, 2019. In November 2019, MWF started to tape episodes in front of a live audience.

On May 25, 2024, on a Facebook post, Manila Wrestling Federation announced its abrupt closure.

On June 27, 2024, one month after the closure of MWF, PUSO Wrestling was on the soft launch featuring most of the MWF wrestlers as its current roster. It is officially launched in August 2024.

== Championships ==
| Championship | Last champion(s) | Reign | Date won | Days held | Notes |
|---|---|---|---|---|---|
| MWF Championship | Jake De Leon | 2 | December 3, 2023 | 1,069+ | Oro Plata Mata defeated MWF All-Stars; thus Fabio Makisig no longer being the champion. JDL Defeated Main Maxx in a Matira Matibay Rules at MWF: Noche Buena |

=== MWF Championship ===
The MWF Championship was established in 2018 and redesigned in 2019. It is now known as the “Jeepney belt”, which contains Filipino themed symbols like perlas "pearls", araw "sun", tambo "reed/bulrush", manok "chicken", pula at bughaw na strap "red and blue strap", and Jeepney main plate.

Key
| No. | Overall reign number |
| Reign | Reign number for the specific champion |
| Days | Number of days held |

| No. | Champion | Championship change | | | Reign statistics | | Notes | Ref. |
| No. | Champion | Date | Event | Location | Reign | Days | Notes | Ref. |
|---|---|---|---|---|---|---|---|---|
| 1 | Robin Sane | December 1, 2018 | MWF Noche Buena | Quezon City | 1 | 237 | Defeated Fabio Makisig to become the inaugural champion. | |
| 2 | Ho Ho Lun | July 27, 2019 | MWF 10: Republika | Manila | 1 | 1,081 | | |
| — | Vacated | July 12, 2022 | n/a | n/a | — | — | The championship was vacated due to inactivity per pandemic. Initially, it wasn't supposed to be vacated as MWF Commissioner Sonny Go declared that Ho Ho Lun was still the champion, and the MWF wrestlers would compete in a series of matches and face Ho Ho Lun in the future. The title was quietly vacated, and the wrestlers who topped the rankings will fight for the MWF Championship. | |
| 3 | Jake de Leon | September 11, 2022 | MWF: Road To Fate 2022 | Quezon City | 1 | 91 | Won the vacant MWF Championship in a 3-Way Elimination match involving Nigel San Jose, and Fabio Makisig. | |
| 4 | Fabio Makisig | December 11, 2022 | MWF: Noche Buena 2022 | Quezon City | 1 | 357 | Defeated Jake De Leon in a Main Event Manila Rules Match to become MWF Champion. | |
| 5 | Jake de Leon | December 3, 2023 | MWF: Noche Buena 2023 | Makati City | 2 | 1,069 | Oro Plata Mata defeated MWF All-Stars; thus Fabio Makisig no longer being the champion. JDL Defeated Main Maxx in a Matira Matibay Rules at MWF: Noche Buena | |
| — | Deactivated | May 25, 2024 | n/a | n/a | — | — | The championship was deactivated due to MWF closing. | |

==== Combined reigns ====
| Rank | Wrestler | No. of reigns | Combined days |
|---|---|---|---|
| 1 | Ho Ho Lun | 1 | 1,081 |
| 2 | Fabio Makisig | 1 | 357 |
| 3 | Jake de Leon | 2 | 265 |
| 4 | Robin Sane | 1 | 237 |

== Roster ==
=== Male wrestlers ===
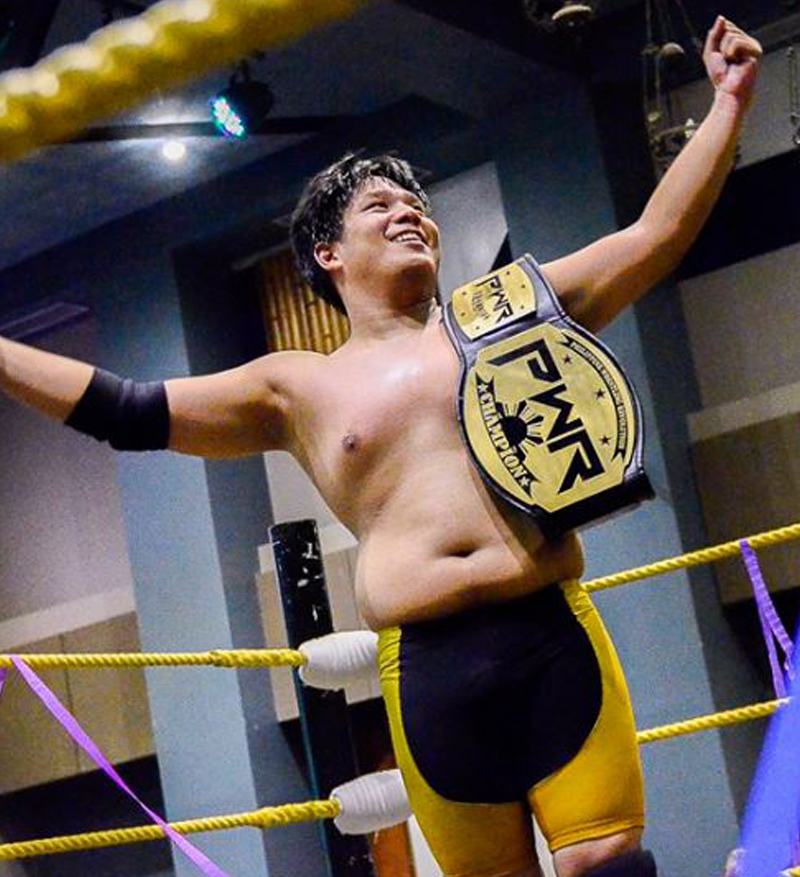
"The Senyorito" Jake de Leon

| Ring Name | Notes |
|---|---|
| Aaron Liwanag | Leader of Bahay ng Liwanag |
| Bienvenido "Bro. Benny" Soriano | Member of Bahay ng Liwanag |
| Black Shirt | MWF Aspirant |
| Blue Shirt | MWF Aspirant Inactive; has not wrestled since March 2023 |
| Serafin Liwanag | Former member of Brgy. Bagsakan (as CJ Serafin). Current member of Bahay ng Liwanag |
| "Godkiller" Dabid Ravena | Member of Oro Plata Mata |
| Danny Zamora | |
| El Katipunero | Member of Super Friends |
| Fabio Makisig | Leader of HSSL |
| Gray Shirt/Diakono | MWF Aspirant Member of Bahay ng Liwanag |
| Isaiah Valencia | Member of Brgy. Bagsakan |
| Jake de Leon | Current MWF Pinoy Wrestling Champion Leader of Oro Plata Mata |
| Joey Rosas | Member of HSSL Winner of Hong Kong-Philippine Alliance Cup |
| Jomar | Former leader of Bahay ng Liwanag. |
| Kanto "Kilabot" Terror | |
| Ken Cifer | World Underground Wrestling - PH Winner of the Chilly Willy Wrestling Cup Tournament 2023 WUW International Tag Team Champion |
| Khayl Sison | Member of HSSL Inactive; has not wrestled since March 2023 |
| Kurt Jimenez | Member of Oro Plata Mata |
| Main Maxx | Former member of Oro Plata Mata |
| Migs Valdez | Inactive; has not wrestled since August 2023 |
| Nigel San Jose | Leader of Brgy. Bagsakan |
| Orange Shirt | MWF Aspirant; later known as Hakai Mateo in PUSO Wrestling |
| Pablo Salvacion | Inactive; has not wrestled since March 2023 |
| Razael | World Underground Wrestling - PH |
| Red Shirt | MWF Aspirant |
| "Danger" Rex Lawin | |
| Robin Sane | World Underground Wrestling - PH |
| Saint John Martin | World Underground Wrestling - PH WUW International Tag Team Champion |

=== Female wrestlers ===
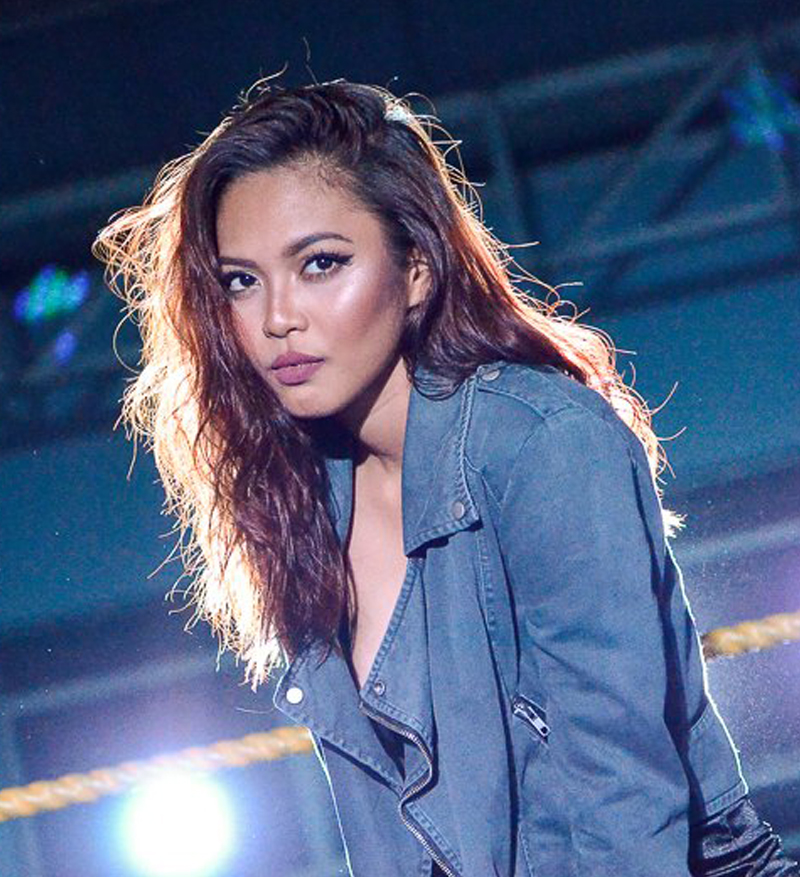
Crystal

| Ring Name | Notes |
|---|---|
| Chelsea Marie | Member of Brgy. Bagsakan |
| Crystal | Inactive; hiatus |
| Jorelle Liwanag | Member of Bahay ng Liwanag |
| Joya | Member of HSSL |
| Patricia Ligaia | MWF's Backstage Chismosa |
| Super P | Member of Super Friends |

=== Other personnel ===
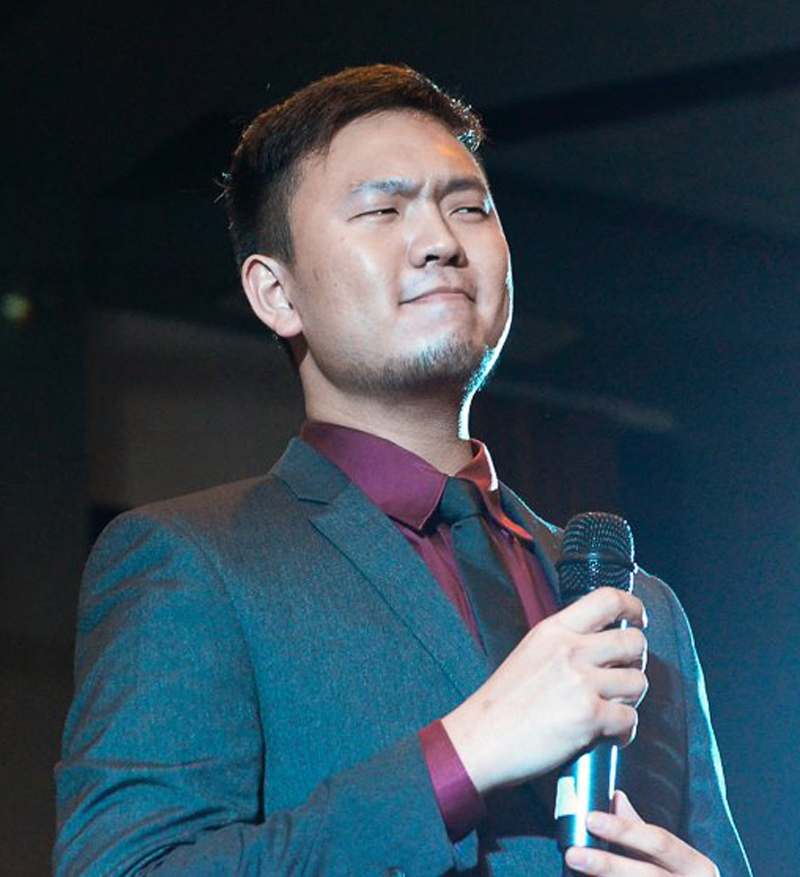
Mr. Sy

| Ring Name | Notes |
|---|---|
| Chuck Lopez | MWF Referee |
| Dante Guinoo | MWF Referee; occasional wrestler "Ang Official na Wrestler" |
| Eduardo Juan | MWF Referee |
| Romeo Moran | MWF Commentator |
| Sig Pecho | MWF Ring Announcer |
| Sonny Go | MWF Commissioner, Commentator, and Ring announcer (Main Event championship matches only) |
| Mr. Sy | Manager of Oro Plata Mata |
| Tarek El Tayech | Senior analyst Manager of Kanto "Kilabot" Terror |
| Veronica Shannon | MWF President |
| William Elvin | Creative Director, occasional commentator |

== MWF Alumni ==
- Aldrin Richards
- ”Classical” Bryan Leo
- Frankie Thurteen
- Gigz Stryker
- Hanzello Shilva
- Jorelle Liwanag
- Ka Dencio
- Ken Warren
- Luchadonna
- Lukas Buhawi
- Mr. Lucha
- Moises Liwanag
- Ninja Ryujin
- Nuke
- PAC RG
- Tala Haliya

== Visiting international wrestlers ==
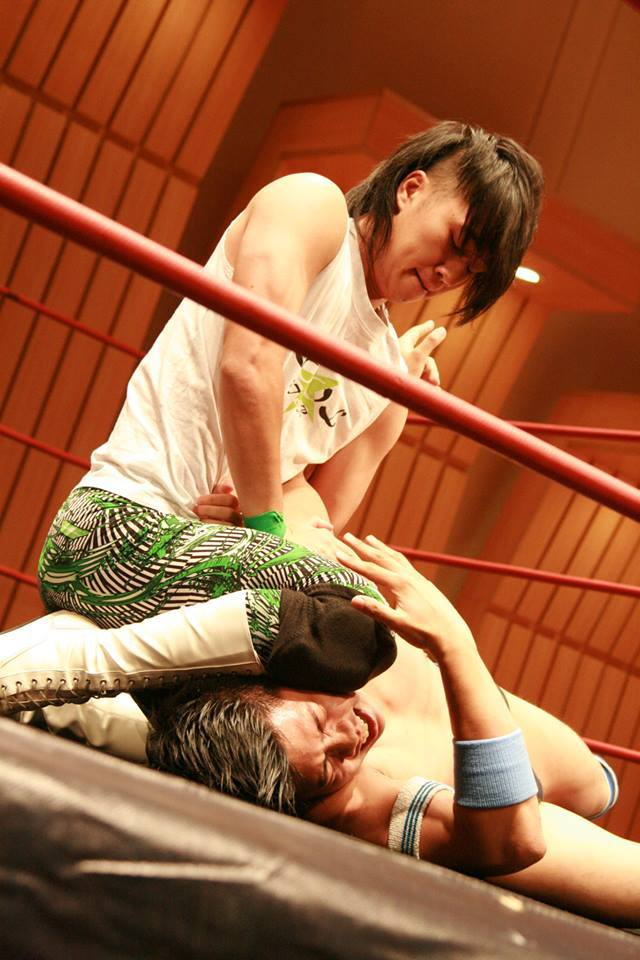
2013 Singapore. Ho Ho Lun against a wrestler called Bit Man, operating an arm bar on his opponent.

- Alexis Lee
- Andruew Tang
- Bitman
- Blackzilla a.k.a. Chilly Willy
- "Beautiful" Charlie Salmon
- Da Butcherman
- The Eurasian Dragon
- Ho Ho Lun
- Jeff Man of The ManBros
- Kevin Man of The ManBros
- Mauler
- Michael Su
- Nor "Phoenix" Diana
- Shaukat
- Sunny Z
- Tajiri
- Thaibarian
- TNT
- Umezawa
- Yappy
