= Tetsuya Naito =

Japanese professional wrestler (born 1982)

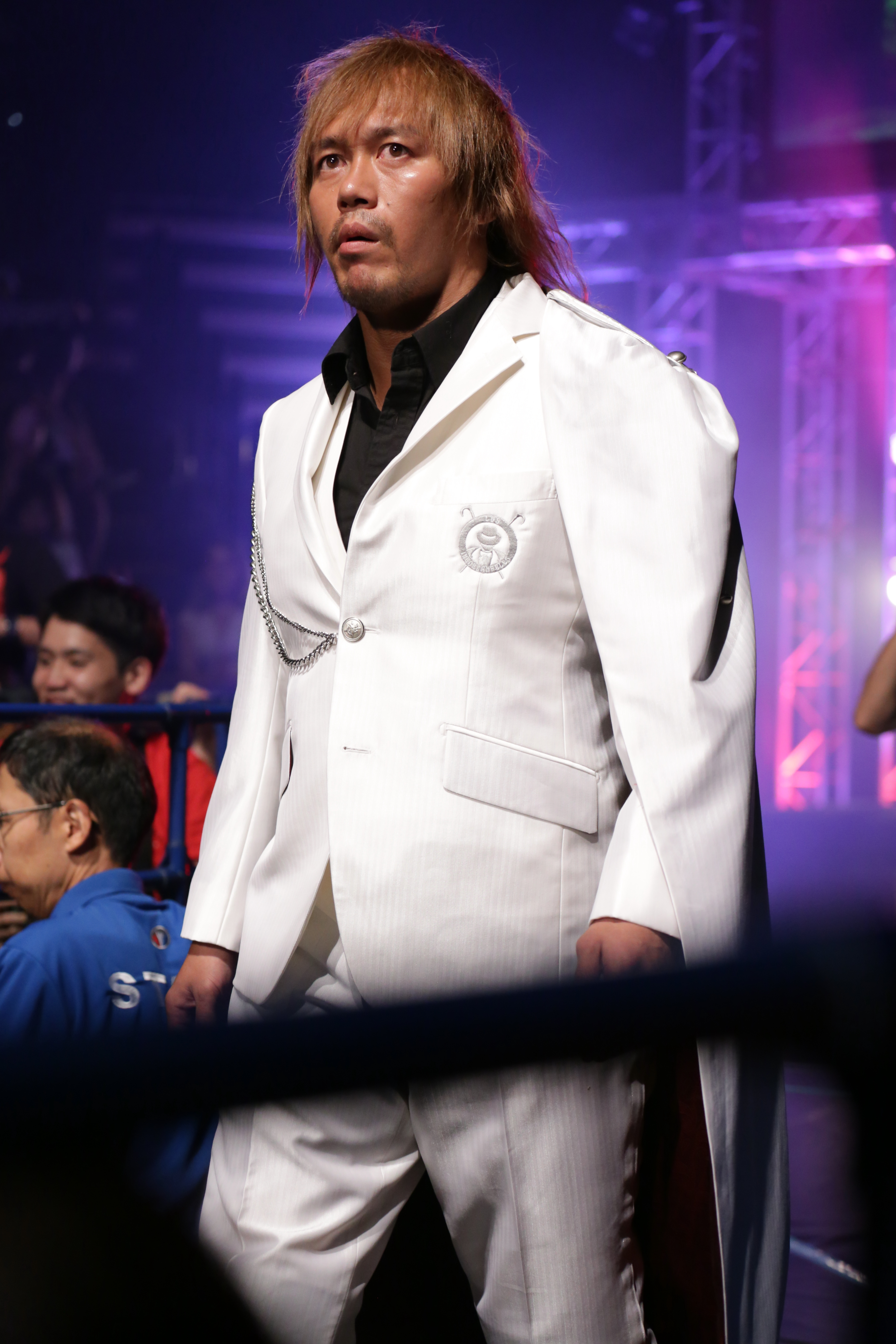
- Naito in 2018

Personal information
- Born: June 22, 1982 (age 44) Adachi, Tokyo, Japan

Professional wrestling career
- Ring name(s): Tetsuya Naito; Naito; Naitoh
- Billed height: 1.80 m (5 ft 11 in)
- Billed weight: 102 kg (225 lb)
- Trained by: Animal Hamaguchi; Takada Dojo; NJPW Dojo; Hiroyoshi Tenzan
- Debut: May 27, 2006

Tetsuya Naito (内藤哲也, Naitō Tetsuya; born June 22, 1982) is a Japanese professional wrestler. He is primarily working for Pro Wrestling Noah as a freelancer, where he is the leader of Los Tranquilos de Japon and the current GHC Heavyweight Champion in his first reign. He is best known for his 21-year run in New Japan Pro-Wrestling (NJPW) from 2004 to 2025.

Naito began training for a professional wrestling career in 2000, initially under Animal Hamaguchi before joining NJPW in 2004, where he underwent further training and progressively rose to main event status. Although NJPW aimed to establish him as a top star by 2014, his clean cut babyface persona caused significant fan backlash, leading to his planned main event match at Wrestle Kingdom, NJPW's biggest event, to be demoted. This, and a stay in the Mexican stable Los Ingobernables through NJPW's partnership with Consejo Mundial de Lucha Libre (CMLL), would lead Naito to reinvent himself as an antihero leading his own stable, Los Ingobernables de Japon. Despite its villainous tendencies, this new gimmick immediately led him to new heights of popularity, and he would win the company's top prize, the IWGP Heavyweight Championship five times, while finally main-eventing Wrestle Kingdom five separate times. He departed NJPW in 2025 and proceed to continue to work as a freelancer on the independent scene and for Pro Wrestling Noah, where formed the spin-off stable Los Tranquilos de Japon.

In NJPW, Naito is also the winner of the 2013, 2017 and 2023 editions of the G1 Climax, NJPW's premier singles tournament, and of the 2016 New Japan Cup. Other accomplishments include being the first person to hold the IWGP Heavyweight and Intercontinental Championships at the same time, a feat he accomplished twice, and being together with partner Yujiro Takahashi as No Limit the first team to have held both the company's heavyweight and junior heavyweight tag titles. He was awarded Tokyo Sports's MVP Award, the publication's highest honor, in 2016, 2017, 2020, and 2023.

== Professional wrestling career ==
=== Training (2000–2004) ===
Naito began training for a professional wrestling career in 2000, initially under Animal Hamaguchi. In 2004 Naito won the "Takeda Dojo Submission" tournament, which landed him a contract with New Japan Pro-Wrestling (NJPW) to train in their dojo.

=== New Japan Pro-Wrestling (2005–2026) ===
==== Young Lion and foreign excursion (2005–2010) ====
After a year in NJPW's Dojo on November 3, 2005, Naito passed a public audition held by NJPW in Korakuen Hall, graduating from the dojo and earning a spot on the promotion's roster. After half a year of further training, Naito wrestled his debut match on May 27, 2006, losing to Takashi Uwano. He picked up his first win on October 29 over Mitsuhide Hirasawa. In 2007, Naito participated in the 2007 Best of the Super Juniors tournament, replacing a wrestler who was unable to compete due to injuries. Tetsuya finished last in Block B, earning four points by defeating Gedo and El Samurai, losing the other four matches in his block.

In February 2008, Naito formed a tag team with fellow rookie Yujiro Takahashi called No Limit. In March, the two went to fifteen-minute time limit draws with former IWGP Junior Heavyweight Tag Team Championship teams such as Koji Kanemoto and Wataru Inoue, and Minoru and Prince Devitt, and Takahashi pinned veteran Super Strong Machine in a trios match. All of this led to a junior tag title challenge for the duo, facing Machine's Legend stablemates Jyushin Thunder Liger and Akira, in which No Limit came up short when Akira pinned Naito.

In May 2008, Naito and Takahashi underwent a five-match series with some of New Japan's top tag teams, dubbed "No Limit Generation Smash", held in the various Zepp clubs across Japan. The teams included Jado and Gedo, Togi Makabe and Toru Yano, Wataru Inoue and Koji Kanemoto, Shinsuke Nakamura and Hirooki Goto, and Yuji Nagata and Manabu Nakanishi. No Limit lost all five matches. A special sixth match in the series took place in Zero1 on May 29, 2008, Naito and Takahashi defeated Zero1's Osamu Namiguchi and Shito Ueda. In July, Naito and Takahashi participated in a single-elimination tournament to decide the new holder of the recently vacated IWGP Junior Heavyweight title. Naito lost to Takahashi in the first round of the tournament. On October 13, 2008, at Destruction '08, Naito and Takahashi defeated Devitt and Minoru to win the IWGP Junior Heavyweight Tag Team Championship. On January 4, 2009, at Wrestle Kingdom III, the Motor City Machine Guns (Alex Shelley and Chris Sabin) defeated them to win the tag team title. Shortly after losing the IWGP Junior Heavyweight Tag Team Championship Naito and Takahashi traveled to North America for a "developmental tour", something often done with young Japanese wrestlers to expose them to other styles of wrestling and help them develop into better wrestlers.

==== No Limit (2010–2011) ====
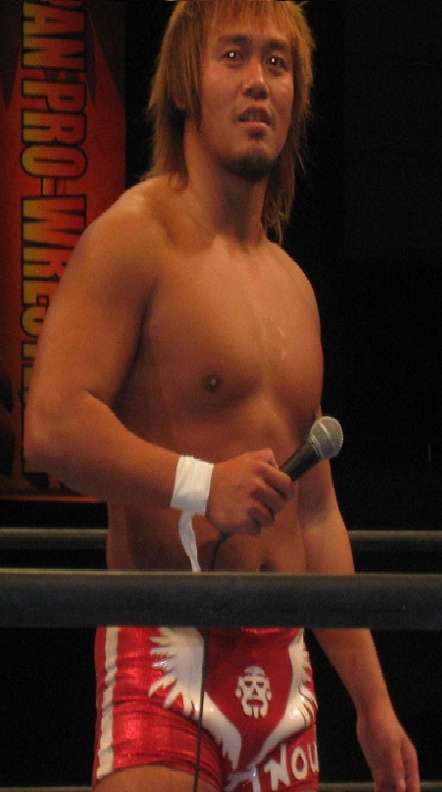
Naito in February 2012

On December 5, 2009, NJPW announced that Naito and Takahashi were returning to Japan as part of their annual January 4 Tokyo Dome Show, Wrestle Kingdom IV. At the event Naito and Takahashi defeated Team 3D (Brother Ray and Brother Devon) and Bad Intentions (Giant Bernard and Karl Anderson) in a three-way hardcore match to win the IWGP Tag Team Championship. No Limit had their first title defense on February 14, 2010, defeating El Texano Jr. and El Terrible to retain the title. On April 4 at New Dimension No Limit joined New Japan's top heel stable Chaos, led by the IWGP Heavyweight Champion Shinsuke Nakamura. On May 3, 2010, at Wrestling Dontaku 2010 Naito and Takahashi lost the IWGP Tag Team Championship to Yuji Nagata and Wataru Inoue of Seigigun in a three-way match, which also included Bad Intentions.

After losing the title, Naito began breaking out on his own, scoring pinfall victories over the reigning IWGP Heavyweight Champion Togi Makabe, IWGP Tag Team Champion Karl Anderson and former IWGP Heavyweight Champion Manabu Nakanishi and wrestling four-time IWGP Heavyweight Champion Hiroshi Tanahashi to a 30-minute time limit draw during the 2010 G1 Climax tournament, while also having another strong showing against Tanahashi in a losing effort at Destruction '10 on October 11. On October 24 No Limit entered the 2010 G1 Tag League. After three wins and two losses, they finished first in their block and advanced to the semifinals. On November 7, after defeating Nakanishi and Strong Man in the semifinals, No Limit was defeated in the finals of the tournament by Nagata and Inoue. On December 11, 2010, No Limit picked up a major win by defeating the TNA World Tag Team Champions, The Motor City Machine Guns, in a non–title match. On January 4, 2011, at Wrestle Kingdom V, Naito unsuccessfully challenged Jeff Hardy for the TNA World Heavyweight Championship. On May 3, No Limit failed in their attempt to regain the IWGP Tag Team Championship from Bad Intentions. After the match, Takahashi walked out on Naito.

In May 2011 Naito took part in New Japan's first tour of the United States, the Invasion Tour 2011. On May 13 in Rahway, New Jersey, he entered the tournament to determine the first ever IWGP Intercontinental Champion, defeating local worker Josh Daniels in his first round match. The following day in New York City, Naito was eliminated from the tournament in the semifinal stage by MVP. Upon their return to Japan, Takahashi turned on Naito on May 26, effectively dissolving No Limit and turning Naito face.

==== Singles success (2011–2015) ====
On June 18 at Dominion 6.18, Takahashi defeated Naito in the first match between the former members of No Limit. On June 28, Naito returned to CMLL for a one-month stint. Upon his return to Japan, Naito faced Takahashi during the first day of the 2011 G1 Climax, with Takahashi once again emerging victorious. Naito then went on to win six out of his eight remaining matches, including picking up big wins over Giant Bernard, Yoshihiro Takayama and IWGP Heavyweight Champion Hiroshi Tanahashi, to win his block and advance to the finals of the 2011 G1 Climax. However, in the end, Naito failed to win the tournament as he was defeated in the finals by Shinsuke Nakamura. On September 19, Naito defeated Takahashi in the third singles match between the two, after which he made an official challenge towards Tanahashi and the IWGP Heavyweight Championship. On October 10 at Destruction '11, Naito failed in his attempt to win the IWGP Heavyweight Championship from Tanahashi.

On January 4, 2012, at Wrestle Kingdom VI, Naito faced All Japan Pro Wrestling's Keiji Muto in a losing effort. From late 2011 to early 2012, Naito was involved in a feud with Nakamura, which built to a singles match on February 12 at The New Beginning, where Naito was victorious and in the process became the number one contender to new IWGP Heavyweight Champion Kazuchika Okada. Naito received his title opportunity on March 4 in the main event of New Japan's 40th anniversary event, but was defeated by Okada. During the next months, Naito began having problems with Tanahashi, after he was chosen over Naito as the next challenger for Okada. In August, Naito took part in the 2012 G1 Climax tournament, during which he picked up a big win over Okada. However, a loss to Hirooki Goto on the final day of the tournament meant that Okada managed to overtake him in the standings, causing him to get eliminated from the tournament. Despite suffering a legitimate knee injury during the tournament, Naito continued wrestling regularly afterwards. On October 8 at King of Pro-Wrestling, Naito was defeated by Yujiro Takahashi, when the referee ended the match due to Takahashi punishing Naito's injured knee. Following the match, Naito was stretchered out of the arena. Naito underwent reconstructive knee surgery on October 16 and was expected to miss eight months of in-ring action.

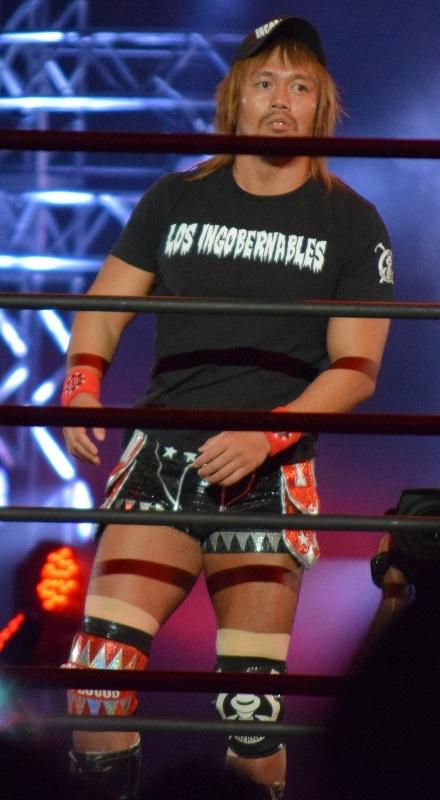
Naito, representing Los Ingobernables in August 2015

On May 3, 2013, Naito made an appearance at New Japan's Wrestling Dontaku 2013 event, announcing that he would be returning to the ring on June 22, while also naming the NEVER Openweight Championship, held by Masato Tanaka, as his goal. On June 22 at Dominion 6.22, Naito defeated Takahashi in his return match. On July 20, Naito failed in his attempt to capture the NEVER Openweight Championship from Tanaka. From August 1 to 11, Naito took part in the 2013 G1 Climax. Finishing with a record of five wins and four losses, Naito clinched the number one spot in his block and advanced to the finals after a win over Karl Anderson on the final day. In the finals, Naito defeated Tanahashi to win the 2013 G1 Climax and earn a shot at the IWGP Heavyweight Championship. Naito, however, announced that he first wanted a rematch with Masato Tanaka for the NEVER Openweight Championship. The following day, Naito was given a contract, which granted him a shot at the IWGP Heavyweight Championship on January 4, 2014, at the Tokyo Dome. On September 29 at Destruction, Naito defeated Masato Tanaka to not only retain the contract, but to also win the NEVER Openweight Championship. On October 14 at King of Pro-Wrestling, Naito successfully defended both the title and the contract against Takahashi. On November 9 at Power Struggle, Naito defeated Masato Tanaka to retain the NEVER Openweight Championship and solidify his spot in the main event of the January 4 Tokyo Dome show. Naito and reigning IWGP Heavyweight Champion Okada faced off on November 23 during the first day of the 2013 World Tag League in a match, where Naito and Mexican wrestler La Sombra were defeated by Okada and Yoshi-Hashi. Naito and La Sombra finished the tournament on December 6 with a record of three wins and three losses, failing to advance from their block. Following a disappointing fan reaction to a confrontation between Naito and Okada, New Japan announced that fans would get to vote whether they or Nakamura and Tanahashi for the IWGP Intercontinental Championship would be the true main event of the Tokyo Dome show. When the results were released on December 9, Naito and Okada had gotten only half the votes Nakamura and Tanahashi had gotten and, as a result, lost their main event spot for New Japan's biggest show of the year. On January 4, 2014, at Wrestle Kingdom 8, Naito failed in his title challenge against Okada. The following day, Naito entered a new feud with Tomohiro Ishii, who announced his intention of becoming the next NEVER Openweight Champion. On February 11 at The New Beginning in Osaka, Naito lost the NEVER Openweight Championship to Ishii in his third title defense.

From July 21 to August 8, Naito took part in the 2014 G1 Climax, where he finished fifth in his block with a record of five wins and five losses. On October 13 at King of Pro-Wrestling, Naito unsuccessfully challenged Okada, whom he had defeated during the G1 Climax, for his IWGP Heavyweight Championship number one contender's contract. The following month, Naito reunited with La Sombra for the 2014 World Tag League. The team finished in the middle of their block with a record of four wins and three losses. In May 2015, Naito took part in the NJPW/Ring of Honor (ROH) co-produced tour of United States and Canada, during which he unsuccessfully challenged Jay Lethal for the ROH World Television Championship at Global Wars '15.

==== Forming Los Ingobernables de Japón and rise to stardom (2015–2019) ====
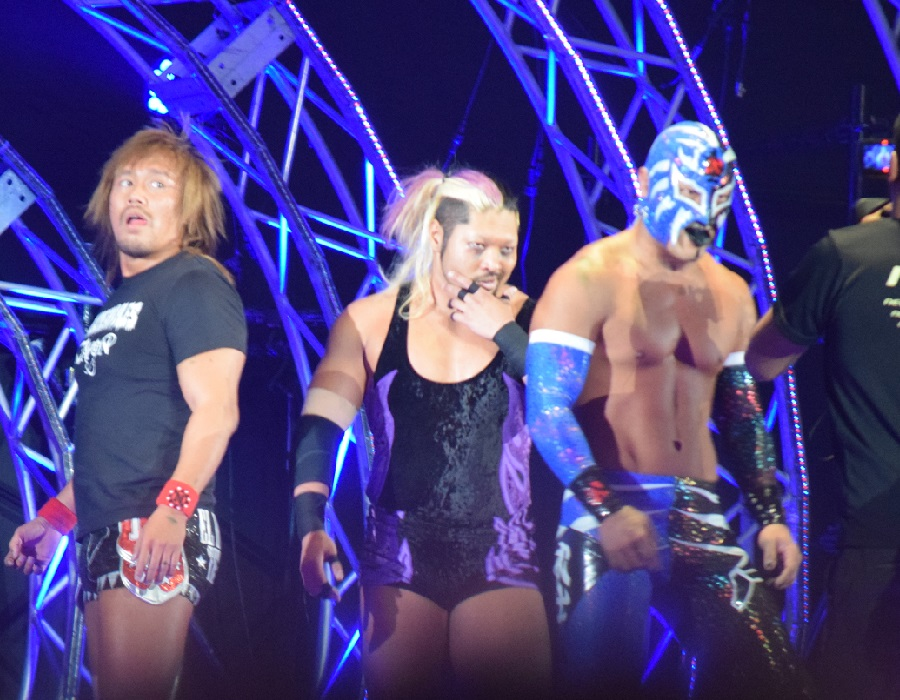
Naito with Los Ingobernables de Japón in February 2016

While the rest of NJPW workers returned to Japan, Naito remained in North America, returning to Mexico and CMLL for a tour, during which he continued teaming with La Sombra as part of his Los Ingobernables stable. His tour culminated with him and La Sombra unsuccessfully challenging Negro Casas and Shocker for the CMLL World Tag Team Championship on June 21. Naito returned to NJPW the following week with a new look and persona, while also announcing that he now represented Los Ingobernables also in NJPW. From July 20 to August 14, Naito took part in the 2015 G1 Climax. Despite big early wins over A.J. Styles and eventual tournament winner Hiroshi Tanahashi, Naito finished third in his block with a record of five wins and four losses and thus failed to advance to the finals. On October 12 at King of Pro-Wrestling, Naito unsuccessfully challenged 2015 G1 Climax winner Tanahashi for his IWGP Heavyweight Championship contract. During the match, the returning Takaaki Watanabe was revealed as Naito's new partner, but his outside interference was stopped by Hirooki Goto and Katsuyori Shibata. Shortly afterwards, Naito and Watanabe, now dubbed "Evil", were joined by Bushi to form the Los Ingobernables de Japón stable. In December, Naito and Evil won their block in the 2015 World Tag League with a record of five wins and one loss, advancing to the finals of the tournament. On December 9, Naito and Evil were defeated in the finals by Togi Makabe and Tomoaki Honma.

On January 4, 2016, at Wrestle Kingdom 10, Naito was defeated by Goto, with whom Los Ingobernables de Japón had been feuding since the previous October. Naito avenged the loss on March 12 by defeating Goto in the finals to win the 2016 New Japan Cup. On April 10 at Invasion Attack 2016, Naito defeated Kazuchika Okada with help from his Los Ingobernables de Japón stablemates Bushi, Evil and the debuting Sanada to win the IWGP Heavyweight Championship for the first time. Naito made his first successful title defense on May 3 at Wrestling Dontaku 2016 against Tomohiro Ishii. On June 19 at Dominion 6.19 in Osaka-jo Hall, Naito lost the IWGP Heavyweight Championship back to Kazuchika Okada. From July 22 to August 13, Naito took part in the 2016 G1 Climax, where he finished second in his block with a record of six wins and three losses. Naito finished tied with block winner Kenny Omega on points, but failed to advance to the finals due to losing to Omega in their head-to-head match on the final day. On September 25 at Destruction in Kobe, Naito defeated Michael Elgin to win the IWGP Intercontinental Championship for the first time. He made his first successful title defense on November 5 at Power Struggle against Jay Lethal. Naito then took part in the 2016 World Tag League, where he and Los Ingobernables member Rush finished with a record of four wins and three losses, failing to advance to the finals due to losing to block winners Tama Tonga and Tanga Loa in their final round-robin match.

On December 14, Tokyo Sports named Naito the 2016 MVP in all of Japanese professional wrestling, marking the first time since 2010 that the award was not won by either Tanahashi or Okada. Naito won the award decidedly in the first round of voting, garnering 18 of 21 votes to beat Okada and Omega. On January 4, 2017, at Wrestle Kingdom 11, Naito successfully defended the IWGP Intercontinental Championship against Tanahashi, which he followed up with another successful title defense against Michael Elgin on February 11 at The New Beginning in Osaka. On April 29 at Wrestling Toyonokuni 2017, Naito retained the IWGP Intercontinental Championship against Juice Robinson, after which he was challenged by Tanahashi. Naito's reign ended on June 11 at Dominion 6.11 in Osaka-jo Hall, where he was defeated by Tanahashi. On July 1 at G1 Special in USA, Naito took part in a tournament to determine the inaugural IWGP United States Heavyweight Champion, but was eliminated in his first round match by Tomohiro Ishii.

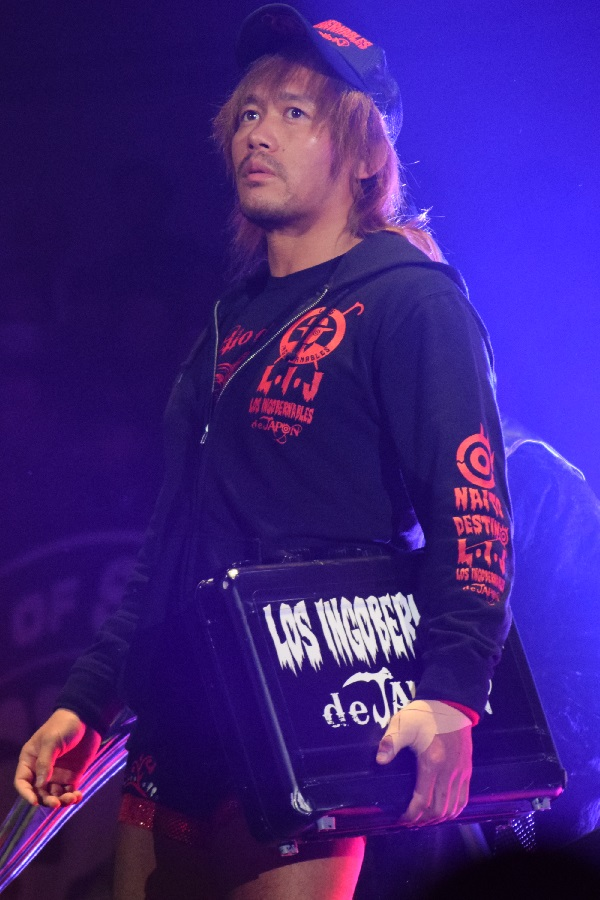
Naito carrying the briefcase containing the Tokyo Dome IWGP Heavyweight Championship challenge rights certificate in November 2017

The following month, Naito won his block in the 2017 G1 Climax with a record of seven wins and two losses, advancing to the finals of the tournament. On August 13, Naito defeated Omega in the finals to win his second G1 Climax. On October 9 at King of Pro-Wrestling, Naito defeated Tomohiro Ishii to ensure his spot in the main event of Wrestle Kingdom 12. On December 14, Naito became the fifth wrestler to win consecutive MVP Awards from Tokyo Sports. On January 4, 2018, Naito was defeated by Okada in the main event of Wrestle Kingdom 12. The following night, at New Year Dash!! 2018, Naito was attacked by Chris Jericho.

On April 29, 2018, at Wrestling Hinokuni, Naito defeated IWGP Intercontinental Champion Minoru Suzuki to win the title for a second time. After a 5-man tag match against Suzuki-gun at Wrestling Dontaku, Naito was again attacked by Jericho, setting up their anticipated match at Dominion. On June 9, 2018, at Dominion 6.9 in Osaka-jo Hall, Jericho defeated Naito to win the IWGP Intercontinental Championship ending Naito's reign at 41 days with 0 successful defenses. The following month, Naito took part in the 2018 G1 Climax, where he finished fourth in his block with a record of six wins and three losses. At Destruction in Beppu, Naito once again defeated Suzuki in a singles match. At Power Struggle, Naito first defeated Zack Sabre Jr., and then saved his stablemate Evil from an ambush by Jericho. Their rematch was set on Wrestle Kingdom 13.

At the event, Naito defeated Jericho to win the IWGP Intercontinental Championship for the third time. At New Year Dash, Suzuki-gun attacked Los Ingobernables de Japón and Taichi challenged Naito to a match for the title. At The New Beginning in Sapporo, Naito retained his title. Naito was announced to take part in 2019 New Japan Cup and faced Kota Ibushi in the first round, but lost. This led to a title match at G1 Supercard, where Naito was defeated by Ibushi. At Dominion 6.9 in Osaka-jo Hall, Naito regained the IWGP Intercontinental Championship from Ibushi.

==== Championship reigns and departure (2019–2025) ====
Naito participated in the 2019 G1 Climax, in which he finished second, with a 5–4 record, losing in the final match of the B block to the man who would go on to win the block, Jay White. Naito's loss to White led to a match between them at Destruction in Kobe, in which Naito lost the IWGP Intercontinental Championship in the night's main event. At Power Struggle, Naito came out to confront Jay White and propose a match between them at Wrestle Kingdom 14 for the IWGP Intercontinental Championship, also expressing his desire to be the first man to hold both the IWGP Intercontinental Championship and the IWGP Heavyweight Championship at the same time. White proceeded to call out both IWGP Heavyweight Champion Kazuchika Okada, and G1 Climax 29 winner Kota Ibushi. During a heated argument; Ibushi, Naito, and White conveyed their wish to be the first "Dual Champion", while Okada said that he only cared about the IWGP Heavyweight Championship. A vote was set up for fans, where they decided for a match for both championships at Wrestle Kingdom 14, which was dubbed the "Double Gold Dash". During the first night of Wrestle Kingdom 14 on January 4, 2020, Naito defeated White to win the Intercontinental Championship, before going on to defeat Okada the following night to win the Heavyweight Championship, becoming the first person to hold both championships simultaneously. After the match, whilst attempting to close out the show with his signature roll-call, Naito was attacked by Kenta. A match between Naito and Kenta was set up for The New Beginning in Osaka where both championships would be defended; Naito emerged as the victor.

On July 11, Naito came down to the ring to celebrate Evil's New Japan Cup win but would instead be attacked by his stablemate. Evil was eventually joined by members of Bullet Club, establishing himself as a heel and defecting from Los Ingobernables de Japón. At Dominion in Osaka-jo Hall on July 12, Naito lost both championships to Evil, ending his reigns at 188 and 189 days respectively. However, Naito would win back both titles at Summer Struggle in Jingu, making him a three-time IWGP Heavyweight Champion and a record six-time IWGP Intercontinental Champion. From September to October, Naito competed in the 2020 G1 Climax in the B Block, but did not win, and finished with 12 points (six wins and three losses). At Power Struggle on November 7, Naito defeated Evil once again to retain the IWGP Heavyweight and Intercontinental Championships. During the first night of Wrestle Kingdom 15 on January 4, 2021, Naito lost the championships to Ibushi, thus ending both his reigns at 128 days and with one title defense. At Castle Attack on February 28, Naito faced Ibushi for the Intercontinental Championship, but was defeated.

On July 11, 2021, at Summer Struggle in Sapporo, Naito teamed up with Los Ingobernables de Japón stablesmate Sanada and defeated Dangerous Tekkers (Taichi and Zack Sabre Jr.) to win the IWGP Tag Team Championship, marking Naito's first tag title reign since No Limit held the title in 2010. However, they lost the titles at Wrestle Grand Slam in Tokyo Dome back to Dangerous Tekkers, ending their reign at just 14 days. Naito returned to singles competition in September, where he competed in the G1 Climax 30 tournament. However, in his opening match against Sabre, which he lost, Naito suffered a knee injury and was forced to forfeit the tournament. Naito returned two months later, to team with Sanada once again in the World Tag League, the team finished with 16 points, but losses to Dangerous Tekkers and Evil and Yujiro Takahashi, who also finished with 16 points, stopped them advancing to the finals. At Wrestle Kingdom 16, L.I.J. lost to United Empire in a six-man tag-team match on Night 1, however Naito defeated Jeff Cobb on Night 2. On Night 3, L.I.J. defeated Pro Wrestling Noah's Kongo (Katsuhiko Nakajima, Manabu Soya, Tadasuke, Alejandro and Kenoh).

Naito was the first challenger for Okada's newly won IWGP World Heavyweight Championship, but was defeated at NJPW New Years Golden Series Naito competed in the New Japan Cup in March, defeating the likes of Cobb and Hiroshi Tanahashi to make it to the semi-finals. In the semi-finals Naito defeated Okada to advance to the finals, where he was defeated by Sabre. Naito received another World Championship match at Wrestling Dontaku, but was once again defeated by Okada. Also Dominion 6.12 in Osaka-jo Hall, Naito was announced to be a part of the G1 Climax 32 tournament in July, where he would compete in the C Block. He finished with 8 points, defeating Sabre on the final block match day to advance to the semi-finals. In the semi-finals, Naito lost to D Block winner Will Ospreay ending his G1 campaign. From November 22 until December 14, Naito and Sanada took part in the 2022 World Tag League finishing the tournament with a record of seven wins and three losses, failing to advance to the finals of the tournament.

On January 4, 2023, Naito teamed with stablemates, Bushi and Sanada, losing to Tanahashi, Shota Umino and Keiji Muto, in Muto's final NJPW match ahead of his upcoming retirement. On the second night of the event on January 21, L.I.J. competed in a series of matches, where L.I.J. members took on members of the Kongo stable of Pro Wrestling Noah. In the show's main event, Naito defeated Kongo's leader Kenoh, winning the L.I.J. vs. Kongo series 3–2 and the NJPW vs. Noah series 5–4. After the match, Naito was approached by Muto, who challenged him to be his final opponent in his retirement match at Keiji Muto Grand Final Pro-Wrestling "Last" Love, which Naito accepted. A month later on February 21 at the event, Naito defeated Muto.

In March, Naito participated in the 2023 New Japan Cup. He defeated El Phantasmo and Chase Owens in his first two matches. After being knocked out in the quarterfinal by Sanada on March 17, he was approached by Taichi, accompanied by the rest of his Just 4 Guys stable, as Sanada left Los Ingobernables de Japón to join the stable, now named Just 5 Guys.

In July, Naito entered the annual G1 Climax tournament, where he was placed into the D Block. Naito finished joint top of his block with 10 points, thus advancing him to the quarterfinal round. In the quarterfinals, Naito defeated Hikuleo to advance in the tournament. In the semi-final round, Naito defeated Will Ospreay. On August 13, Naito won the tournament, defeating Kazuchika Okada in the finals. This was his third G1 Climax victory, and earnt him a future IWGP World Heavyweight Championship match at Wrestle Kingdom 18. The following day, during a press conference, instead of receiving a briefcase containing a contract for a title shot at Wrestle Kingdom, Naito was automatically inserted into the main event at the Tokyo Dome, instead of defending is title shot, a tradition that was broke by Okada the previous year. This led to Naito, questioning the point of wrestling with no stakes, threatening to "lie down in five seconds", while Jeff Cobb rightfully asserted his claim to challenge Naito for his title match. This controversy resulted in Naito sarcastically handmaking a Tokyo Dome 'contract' and a 'briefcase' to put it in, which led to NJPW announcing that Naito would defend his contract at Destruction in Kobe. At the event, Naito successfully defended his IWGP World Heavyweight Championship number one contender's contract against Cobb. The following month at Destruction in Ryōgoku, following a successful title defence against Evil, Naito confronted former teammate and IWGP World Heavyweight Champion, Sanada who was now confirmed to be his Wrestle Kingdom opponent.

On January 4, 2024, at Wrestle Kingdom, Naito defeated Sanada in the main event to win his first IWGP World Heavyweight Championship and end Sanada's record 271-day reign. After a brief interruption by House of Torture being fought off by Sanada, Naito managed to fulfill his childhood dream and closed the show with his signature roll-call, after being cut off by KENTA four years prior, with Sanada requesting a rematch between the two. On night 2 of The New Beginning in Sapporo, Naito retained the title against Sanada in a rematch. At Sakura Genesis, Naito successfully defended his title against 2024 New Japan Cup winner and stablemate Yota Tsuji. After the match, he would be confronted by Jon Moxley, who challenged Naito for Windy City Riot. At Windy City Riot, Naito lost the championship to Moxley, ending his reign at 99 days. At Dominion 6.9 in Osaka-jo Hall, Naito defeated Callum Newman. Later in the show, Naito confronted Moxley and challenged him to a rematch for the IWGP World Heavyweight Championship at Forbidden Door, which Moxley accepted. At Forbidden Door, Naito defeated Moxley to regain the championship. From July 20 and August 12, Naito took part in the 2024 G1 Climax finishing the tournament with a record of five wins and four losses, with a loss to Great-O-Khan on the final day of the tournament caused him to miss advancing to the play-off match of the tournament narrowly. On October 14 at King of Pro-Wrestling, Naito lost the title to G1 Climax winner Zack Sabre Jr., ending his second reign at 106 days.

For the 2024 World Tag League, Naito teamed with fellow L.I.J member Hiromu Takahashi, where they were placed in B-Block. The duo finished at the top of their block with 10 points and went on to defeat Bullet Club War Dogs' Gabe Kidd and Sanada in the grand finals. However, due to the IWGP Tag Team Championships being vacant at the time, Naito and Takahashi decided to face each other at Wrestle Kingdom 19 in a singles match instead. At Wrestle Kingdom 19, Naito defeated Takahashi. The following night at Wrestle Dynasty, Naito and Takahashi failed to win the tag titles in a three-way tag team match, which was won by The Young Bucks. On February 11 at The New Beginning in Osaka, Naito and Takahashi defeated The Young Bucks to win the IWGP Tag Team Championships. On April 4 at Sakura Genesis, they lost the titles to Callum Newman and Jeff Cobb. On April 16, it was announced that Naito would not be renewing his contract and would be leaving NJPW after fulfilling his dates at the Wrestling Dontaku series the next month. Naito's final match as an NJPW talent took place at Wrestling Dontaku: Night 2 on May 4 where he teamed with Bushi, Shingo Takagi, and Hiromu Takahashi to defeat Shota Umino, Tomohiro Ishii and Just 4 Guys' Taichi and Taka Michinoku.

==== One night return (2026) ====
On January 4, 2026 at Wrestle Kingdom 20, Naito made a one night return to NJPW, where he bid farewell to Tanahashi after the latter's retirement match.

=== Total Nonstop Action Wrestling (2009) ===
No Limit worked mainly for Total Nonstop Action Wrestling (TNA), while also making an appearance for both Team 3D's wrestling academy and Jersey All Pro Wrestling, although Naito was not able to wrestle in JAPW due to an injury and was replaced by the team's TNA ally Sheik Abdul Bashir. Naito and Takahashi worked for TNA approximately two months, receiving another unsuccessful shot at the IWGP Junior Heavyweight Tag Team Championship. No Limit's final appearance for TNA was a handicap match on the May 14, 2009 episode of Impact! against Kevin Nash, which the team lost.

=== Consejo Mundial de Lucha Libre (2009–2010) ===
No Limit made their debut for Consejo Mundial de Lucha Libre (CMLL) in Mexico City, Mexico, on May 29, 2009, teaming with Dos Caras Jr. to defeat Héctor Garza, La Sombra and Volador Jr. No Limit were presented as "Anti-Mexican" heels ("bad guys") and soon began teaming with Okumura under the team name La Ola Amarilla (Spanish for "The Yellow Wave"), in matches against Mexicans.

On July 10, 2009, No Limit teamed with Black Warrior to defeat the team of Héctor Garza, Toscano and El Sagrado, After the match Black Warrior made a challenge on behalf of Takahashi (as he does not speak Spanish) for a "hair vs. hair" match with Garza. This led to all men being involved in a 15-man steel cage Luchas de Apuestas match at Infierno en el Ring that Naito won by pinning Toscano, forcing him to have his hair shaved off. Following the match No Limit's focus was on Black Warrior, who had turned on them during the cage match. When Jyushin Thunder Liger toured Mexico in September, 2009 he joined the "Anti-Mexico" faction, teaming with No Limit and Okumura to defeat Team Mexico (Último Guerrero, Atlantis, Black Warrior and Héctor Garza) at the CMLL 76th Anniversary Show on September 18, 2009. The storyline feud between No Limit and Black Warrior reached its conclusion on October 16, 2009 as Black Warrior faced Takahashi in a Lucha de Apuesta, hair vs. hair match that Takahashi won two falls to one, forcing Black Warrior to have his hair shaved off after the match.

After the storyline with Black Warrior ended, No Limit began working with the team of El Texano Jr. and El Terrible in a feud that led to a Lucha de Apuesta hair vs. hair match between the two teams that was the main event of CMLL's Sin Salida show on December 4, 2009. After being successful throughout the summer and fall No Limit finally lost to Texano Jr. and Terrible at Sin Salida and were both shaved completely bald after the match per Lucha Libre traditions.

While Takahashi decided not to return to CMLL, Naito stated that he would like to work in Mexico between NJPW tours. Naito teamed up with Okumura and was expected to team up with Taichi, a NJPW rookie who would travel to Mexico to gain experience.

=== All Elite Wrestling (2023–2024) ===
On the June 24, 2023 episode of AEW Collision, Naito made his debut for All Elite Wrestling (AEW), after being revealed as Darby Allin and Sting's mystery partner at Forbidden Door against Le Suzuki Gods (Chris Jericho, Sammy Guevara and Minoru Suzuki). At the event, Naito won the match for his team, scoring the pin on Suzuki, following assistance from Sting. Afterwards, Jericho attempted a post-match beatdown on Naito, referencing their recurring feud from 2018, but backed off once Sting made the save.

On the June 26, 2024 episode of AEW Dynamite, Naito returned to AEW, where he brawled with Jon Moxley ahead of their match at Forbidden Door.

=== Independent circuit (2025–present) ===
On July 25, 2025, Naito and Bushi made their first post-NJPW appearance at Revolution Pro Wrestling (RevPro)'s event Summer Sizzler as Los Tranquilos de Japon, where they defeated Kieron Lacey and Mark Trew. On September 29 at RevPros event Coventry, Naito recruited Angel Reyes into LTJ. On November 28, Naito made an appearance in Singapore Pro Wrestling, where he defeated Da Butcherman and "The Statement" Andruew Tang to win the SPW Southeast Asian Championship. In March 2026, Naito competed in the 2026 16 Carat Gold Tournament tournament for Westside Xtreme Wrestling (wXw), defeating Dieter Schwartz in the first round but lost to eventual winner Ahura in the quarterfinals.

=== Pro Wrestling Noah (2026–present) ===
On January 1, 2026 at Pro Wrestling Noah's Noah The New Year 2026, Los Tranquilos de Japon defeated Maruken (Kenoh and Naomichi Marufuji) to win the GHC Tag Team Championship. On February 6, Naito introduced RYUSEI as the newest member of LTJ. At Noah Spring Mayhem on May 2, Naito competed in his first singles match in Japan since leaving NJPW, losing to Ozawa. On June 25 at Legacy Rise 2026: Night 2, Naito and Bushi lost their titles to Passionate Ratel's (Manabu Soya and Yuki Iino), ending their reign at 175 days and three successful defenses. On August 9, Naito defeated Shane Haste to win the GHC Heavyweight Championship for the first time.

== Other media ==
- Naito, along with fellow NJPW wrestlers Hiroshi Tanahashi, Hiroyoshi Tenzan, Kazuchika Okada, Satoshi Kojima and Toru Yano, appears as a member of the gang Justis in the 2016 video game Yakuza 6.
- Naito appears in the anime Tiger Mask W.
- Naito appears in the Japanese manga HIGHER AND HIGHER! Shinnichi Gakuen, which is based on his pro-wrestling career.

== Personal life ==
Naito is a fan of the Hiroshima Toyo Carp baseball team and has often wrestled in red, their main color, while their fans have been known to sing his theme song as a chant for the team. A native of Tokyo, he originally supported his hometown Yomiuri Giants baseball team, but switched teams in the 1990s after Tatsunori Hara's retirement. In 2017, he collaborated on a shirt with Hiroshima Toyo Carp.

Naito's signature taunt since 2009, which consists of him widening his eyes with his thumbs and index fingers, is known as "Abre los Ojos" ("Open Your Eyes"). Its name is in Spanish because he came up with it during his stint in Mexico, where local fans racially abused him for his Asian eyes. The taunt has since been used by baseball player Shinnosuke Ogasawara and singer Yuki Kashiwagi, among others.

== Championships and accomplishments ==
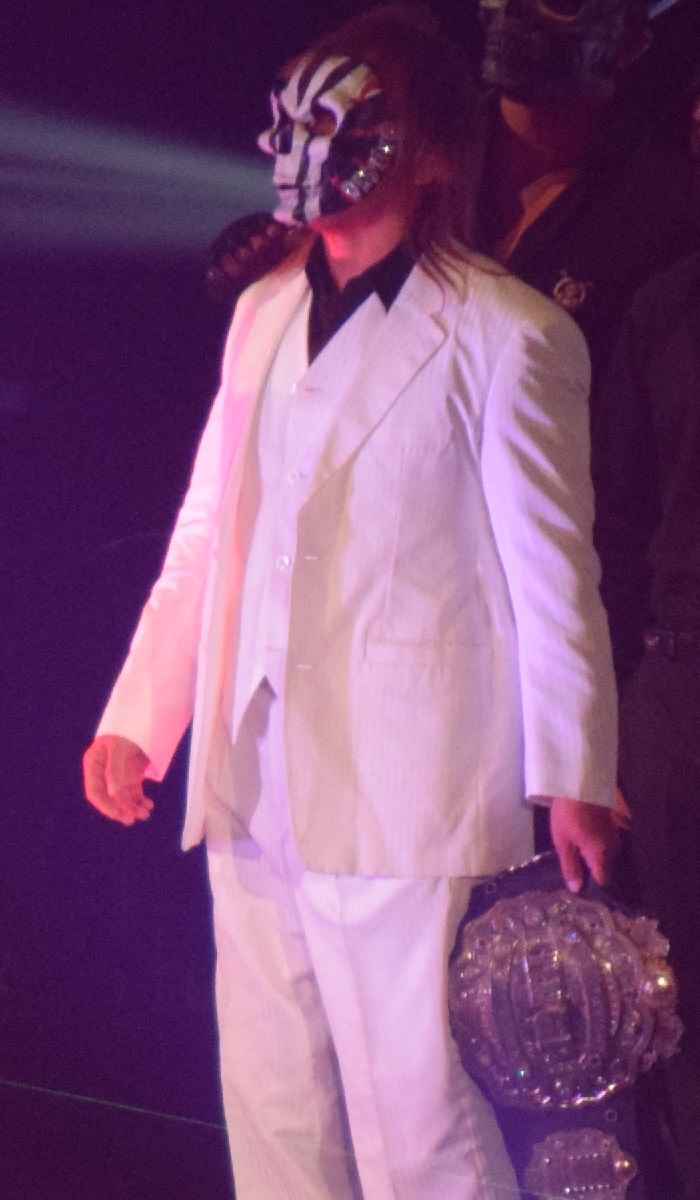
Naito as IWGP Heavyweight Champion, a title he won 5 times.

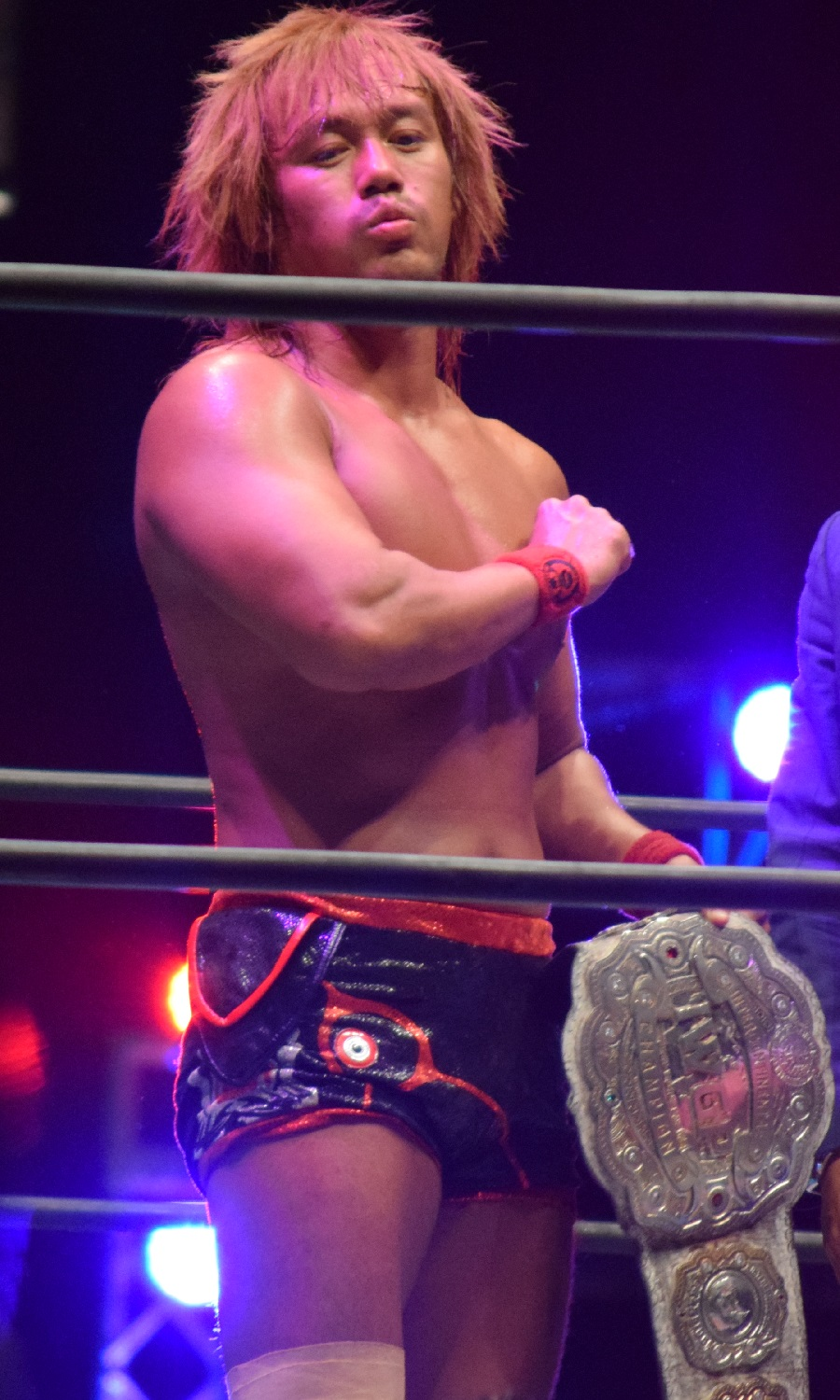
Naito as IWGP Intercontinental Champion, being the record holder of most reigns with 8.

- New Japan Pro-Wrestling
  - IWGP Heavyweight Championship (Note: The title was named the IWGP Heavyweight Championship during Naito's first three reigns & IWGP World Heavyweight Championship during his fourth and fifth reign.) (5 times)
  - IWGP Intercontinental Championship (8 times) (Note: With the reactivation of the IWGP Heavyweight Championship and the restored and combined histories of both it, the World Heavyweight, and the Intercontinental titles, all former IWGP World Heavyweight Champions are retroactively recognized as having been an IWGP Intercontinental Champion.)
  - NEVER Openweight Championship (1 time)
  - IWGP Tag Team Championship (3 times) – with Yujiro Takahashi (1), Sanada (1) and Hiromu Takahashi (1)
  - IWGP Junior Heavyweight Tag Team Championship (1 time) – with Yujiro Takahashi
  - G1 Climax (2013, 2017, 2023)
  - New Japan Cup (2016)
  - First NJPW Triple Crown Champion
  - World Tag League (2024) – with Hiromu Takahashi
  - New Japan Pro-Wrestling Best Bout (2016) vs. Kenny Omega on August 13
  - New Japan Pro-Wrestling MVP (2016)
- Nikkan Sports
  - MVP Award (2016)
  - Match of the Year Award (2016) vs. Kenny Omega on August 13
- Pro Wrestling Illustrated
  - Ranked No. 5 of the top 500 singles wrestlers in the PWI 500 in 2020 and 2024
- Pro Wrestling Noah
  - GHC Heavyweight Championship (1 time, current)
  - GHC Tag Team Championship (1 time) – with Bushi
- Sports Illustrated
  - Ranked No. 4 of the top 10 wrestlers in 2020
- Singapore Pro Wrestling
  - SPW Southeast Asian Championship (1 time, current)
- Tokyo Sports
  - Best Bout Award (2020) vs. Kazuchika Okada on January 5 at Wrestle Kingdom 14
  - MVP Award (2016, 2017, 2020, 2023)
  - Technique Award (2018)
- Wrestling Observer Newsletter
  - Most Charismatic (2017, 2018)
  - Best Gimmick (2017) – Los Ingobernables de Japón
  - Japan MVP (2020)
  - Wrestling Observer Newsletter Hall of Fame (2022)

=== Luchas de Apuestas record ===
Winner (wager)	Loser (wager)	Location	Event	Date	Notes
Naito (hair)	Toscano (hair)	Mexico City, Mexico	Infierno en el Ring (2009)	July 31, 2009	(Note: This was a 15-man steel cage elimination match, also including Yujiro, Shocker, Héctor Garza, Negro Casas, Black Warrior, El Terrible, El Texano, Jr., Shigeo Okumura, Blue Panther, Máximo, Ray Mendoza Jr., Heavy Metal and Mictlán.)
El Texano Jr. and El Terrible (hair)	No Limit (Yujiro and Naito) (hair)	Mexico City, Mexico	Sin Salida	December 4, 2009	
