= Singapore Pro Wrestling =

Pro wrestling promotion in Singapore

- Acronym: SPW
- Founded: 2012
- Headquarters: 126 Joo Seng Road, #02-01 Goldpine Industrial Building, 368355, Singapore
- Founder(s): Andruew Tang; Vadim Koryagin
- Website: https://www.spw.com.sg/

Singapore Pro Wrestling, commonly shortened to SPW, is a professional wrestling promotion based in Singapore. It was the first modern professional wrestling promotion in Southeast Asia, and was founded by Andruew Tang (known as "The Statement" Andruew Tang in SPW), the first Singaporean professional wrestler, and Vadim Koryagin, in February 2012. The promotion also has a wrestling school, in which Andruew Tang is the head coach, and SPW wrestlers, Aiden Rex, Dr. Gore, Alexis Lee and Da Butcherman work as assistant coaches. SPW is best known for producing Dante Chen (known as "Trexxus" during his time in SPW), the first wrestler from Southeast Asia to sign with WWE, making his debut on WWE NXT, on 22 September 2021.

== History ==
=== Early years (2011–2014) ===
In 2011, Andruew Tang, an aspiring Singaporean professional wrestler, would attend a talk by Vadim Koryagin, a Russian businessman and owner of Independent Wrestling Federation (IWF), a Russia-based promotion, established in 2002. Together the two would form the nation's first pro wrestling promotion, Singapore Pro Wrestling in February 2012. They would begin to train the first generation of Singaporean professional wrestlers, including Tang, who would become "The Statement" Andruew Tang, Singapore's first professional wrestler and Kaiser Trexxus, who would become the first Singaporean in the WWE, through Vadim's coaching and expertise. SPW faced difficulties in the beginning, with many people doubting the promotion, and believing that Singaporeans "were too small". In the beginning some of their wrestlers would appear in IWF shows, but later on they would host live shows in Singapore, beginning to gain an audience. SPW would develop more regular talent, including Dr. Gore and The Eurasian Dragon, and eventually Tang and Trexxus would become trainers, after honing their talents. In 2014, SPW would grow to a size that they were able to host international talent including Johnny Gargano and Sonjay Dutt.

=== Growth and expansion (2015–2019) ===
A major turning point for SPW, was when they hosted a show a day before the 2015 WWE Live Event at the Singapore Indoor Stadium, which sold out completely. SPW would inaugurate their first title, the Southeast Asian Championship in 2015, with their first champion being "The Statement" Andruew Tang. SPW would host foreign talent, including IWF wrestler, Lokomotiv and DDT wrestler, Masa Takanashi, who would help the promotion grow, each winning the Southeast Asian championship. In the next year SPW would add three more titles to the promotion, the Queen of Asia, Tag Team and Singapore championships. In 2017, Rene Dupree would debut in SPW, facing Tang. Later that year, NXT UK Champion, at that time, Pete Dunne would debut in the company and face Tang in a singles match. SPW would continue to grow, developing local talent such as Alexis Lee (who would be called for a WWE tryout along with The Statement and Kaiser Trexxus), bodybuilder and the 2016 Mr. Singapore, Danie "Destroyer" Dharma, Da Butcherman, Big T, BGJ and Aiden Rex, who would all win various championships in the SPW promotion. In 2018, SPW would host its first all female event, titled Ladies Night. The main event of this show would feature Riho facing Makoto, which would become SPWs most viewed match ever. In 2019, globally-known AEW wrestler, Kenny Omega, would also debut in the promotion, participating in a 3 on 3 tag match. Tajiri would make his SPW debut in 2019, defeating Tang. SPW would grow to have over 10,000 subscribers on YouTube, and over 10,000 followers on Instagram and Facebook combined.

=== Covid-19 and return (2020–present) ===
SPW hosted its last show of 2020, No Guts No Glory, in February, featuring then NXT UK Women's Champion, Meiko Satomura and Dash Chisako in the main event. During the COVID-19 pandemic, SPW produced two seasons of an in-house show, called SPW Prove: Alive and Kicking and SPW Prove: It's A Slamdemic. During the first season of Prove, The Statement would retire Kaiser Trexxus from the promotion, who would leave to WWE NXT and debut as Dante Chen. Their second season was cut short as restrictions were lifted and SPW returned to a live show format, with their first private live show back on 15 April 2022, SPW: Sembawang Showdown, a private event for migrant workers of Singapore. SPW hosted their first public live show, SPW: Homecoming on 27 May 2022, that sold out in a few days. In July, SPW had their second public event of the year, SPW: Battlefront. In September, SPW would announce its partnership with Nothing But Cheese Burger to introduce the promotions 5th title, The NBCB Championship, a 24/7 championship. In November 2022, SPW hosted its 10th anniversary show, featuring the return of Riho, Tajiri, Masa Takanashi, HoHo Lun and the debut of Chris Brookes and Mei Suruga, SPW X: Astronomical Anniversary.

== Roster ==
Ring name	Real name	Notes
Aiden Rex	Unknown	
Alexis Lee	Lee Xin Yi	
BGJ	Unknown	
Black Arrow	Kamalraj	
Bryson Blade	Unknown	
Carl Hella	Joel Sam Thomas	General Manager
CBK	Unknown	
CK Vin	Alvin Ho	
Da Butcherman	Danial Alias	
Darren 'Yam Seng' Chua	Darren Chua	Ring Announcer
Destroyer Dharma	Danie Dharma	Inactive
Dr. Gore	Caleb Tan	
Emman	Unknown	
Kentona	Unknown	
Kyle "The Trickster" Black	Keeran Broysten	Inactive
"Mad Kat" Karina	Unknown	
Ma$on	Unknown	SPW Hardcore Champion
Mighty Mighty	Mohammed Taufik	
Ms. Selina	Unknown	SPW Queen of Asia Champion
Mr. Frois	Unknown	Ring Announcer
Ray	Ray Lim	
Referee Pritish	Unknown	Referee
Referee Sodiq	Unknown	Referee
Riky Malek	Unknown	Inactive
Riz	Riz	
RJ	Unknown	Inactive
Ryan Shen	Unknown	
Tok Bomoh Mekong	Unknown	
"The Statement" Andruew Tang	Andruew Tang You Liang	Co-founder / Promoter, SPW Southeast Asian Tag Team Champion

=== Notable alumni/guests ===
- Anton Deryabin
- Baliyan Akki
- Ben-K
- Carlo Cannon
- Chris Brookes
- Cima
- Craven
- Crystal
- Dante Chen
- Dash Chisako
- El Lindaman
- Emman Azman
- Emi Sakura
- Harashima
- Hiroyo Matsumoto
- Ho Ho Lun
- Indi Hartwell
- Issei Onitsuka
- Jake de Leon
- Jason Lee
- Jibzy
- Joaquin Wilde
- Johnny Gargano
- Kalisto
- Kaz Hayashi
- Kasey
- Kelly Kimberly Cheong
- Kenny Omega
- Lokomotiv
- Lacey Lane
- Lio Rush
- Makoto
- Mark Davis
- Masa Takanashi
- Matt Cross
- Meiko Satomura
- Mei Suruga
- Michael Nakazawa
- Miyu Yamashita
- Mizuki
- Monomoth
- Nor 'Phoenix' Diana
- Pete Dunne
- Reika Saiki
- Rene Dupree
- Riho
- Saki Akai
- Shaukat
- Shazza McKenzie
- Shivam
- Shun Skywalker
- Sonjay Dutt
- Sultan Singh
- Susumu Yokosuka
- Tajiri
- T-Hawk
- Trent Seven
- Wolfgang
- Yoshi Tatsu
- Yuki Kamifuku
- Yukio Sakaguchi
- Yoshiki Inamura
- Zeda Zhang

== Progression of champions ==
=== SPW Southeast Asian Championship ===
SPW Southeast Asian Championship

Details
- Promotion: Singapore Pro Wrestling
- Date established: Oct 23, 2015
- Current champion: Tetsuya Naito
- Date won: Nov 28, 2025
Statistics
- First champion: "The Statement" Andruew Tang
- Most reigns: "The Statement" Andruew Tang (5 reigns)
- Longest reign: "The Statement" Andruew Tang (826 days)
- Shortest reign: Shaukat (22 days)
- Oldest champion: Tetsuya Naito (43 years, 159 days)
- Youngest champion: Kaiser Trexxus (21 years, 7 days)
- Heaviest champion: Lokomotiv (115 kg)
- Lightest champion: Aiden Rex (64 kg)

The SPW Southeast Asian Championship is the regional championship, and the primary and most prestigious title of the Singapore Pro Wrestling promotion. There have been a total of 12 reigns shared between 8 different champions. The current champion is Tetsuya Naito, who won the title for the first time on 28 November 2025. Tang was also the inaugural champion, and is the only wrestler to have held the title more than once. Tang has the record for having the record for the longest reign at 826 days and the most reigns at 5.

Key
No.	Overall reign number
Reign	Reign number for the specific champion
Days	Number of days held
<1	Reign lasted less than a day
+	Current reign is changing daily

No.	Champion	Championship change			Reign statistics		Notes	Ref.
No.	Champion	Date	Event	Location	Reign	Days	Notes	Ref.
1	"The Statement" Andruew Tang	23 October 2015	SPW Prove 5	Singapore	1	140	Tang defeated The Arsenal Afii in the inaugural SEA championship bout.	
2	Masa Takanashi	11 March 2016	SPW Wrestling City Asia	Federation Of Chinese Clan Associations, Singapore	1	71	Takanashi is the first Japanese wrestler to ever hold this title.	
3	"The Statement" Andruew Tang	21 May 2016	SPW Wrestling City Asia	Kuala Lumpur, Malaysia	2	251	This was a three-way match also involving Cima.	
4	Kaiser Trexxus	27 January 2017	SPW Unchained In Changi	Park Avenue Convention Center, Changi, Singapore	1	378	Trexxus is the youngest wrestler to ever win this title.	
5	Lokomotiv	9 February 2018	SPW Repentless	Federation of Chinese Clan Associations, Singapore	1	462	This was a chair match.	
6	"The Statement" Andruew Tang	17 May 2019	SPW Atonement	Federation of Chinese Clan Associations, Singapore	3	246	This was a four-way match also involving Jake de Leon and Trexxus.	
7	Shaukat	18 January 2020	MYPW Wrestle Nation	Spacerubix, Kuala Lumpur, Malaysia	1	22	This was a Winner-take-all match where Shaukat's MYPW World-To-Regional Title was also on the line. On 9 February, Shaukat was forced to relinquish his title due to a concussion.	
8	"The Statement" Andruew Tang	21 February 2020	SPW No Guts No Glory	The Pavillion, Singapore	4	826	This match was against JY Eagle for the newly vacant SEA championship. Tang's reign is the longest in the history of this title. However, his reign was elongated due to the COVID-19 pandemic.	
9	Aiden Rex	27 May 2022	SPW Homecoming	Federation of Chinese Clan Associations, Singapore	1	721	This match happened at the first public live show after the Covid-19 pandemic, concluding a storyline that was teased in early 2020, and naturally delayed due to the coronavirus.	
10	"The Statement" Andruew Tang	17 May 2024	SPW Ignition	Futsing Association Building, Singapore	5	175		
11	Da Butcherman	8 November 2024	SPW Crowning Glory	Foochow Building, Singapore	1	385		
12	Tetsuya Naito	28 November 2025	SPW Tranquillo	Foochow Building, Singapore	1	355+		

=== SPW Singapore Championship ===
SPW Singapore Championship

Details
- Promotion: Singapore Pro Wrestling
- Date established: Oct 28, 2016
- Current champion: Carlo Cannon
- Date won: 3 July 2026
Statistics
- First champion: The Eurasian Dragon
- Most reigns: Black Arrow (2 reigns)
- Longest reign: Da Butcherman (1098 days)
- Shortest reign: The Eurasian Dragon (43 days)
- Oldest champion: Destroyer Dharma (33 years, 0 days)
- Youngest champion: Da Butcherman (24 years, 314 days)
- Heaviest champion: Da Butcherman (110 kg)
- Lightest champion: Aiden Rex (64 kg)

The SPW Singapore Championship is the national championship and the secondary title of the Singapore Pro Wrestling promotion. There have been a total of twelve reigns. The current champion is Carlo Cannon, who won the title for the first time on 3 July 2026. The inaugural champion was the Eurasian Dragon who won the belt in 2016. Da Butcherman holds the record for the longest reigning Singapore Champion at 1098 days. Black Arrow holds the record for most reigns at 2.

Key
No.	Overall reign number
Reign	Reign number for the specific champion
Days	Number of days held
<1	Reign lasted less than a day
+	Current reign is changing daily

No.	Champion	Championship change			Reign statistics		Notes	Ref.
No.	Champion	Date	Event	Location	Reign	Days	Notes	Ref.
1	The Eurasian Dragon	28 October 2016	SPW Wrestling City - Tropical Storm	Singapore	1	43	This was a three-way match involving Power Warrior and Dr. Gore to decide the inaugural Singapore Champion.	
2	Power Warrior	10 December 2016	SPW Wrestle The Odds II	Singapore	1	314	This was a three-way match involving Eurasian Dragon and Shaukat, Warrior pinned Shaukat to win the match.	
3	Aiden Rex	20 October 2017	SPW Wrestling City Asia - RELOAD	Singapore	1	574	This was a three-way match involving Power Warrior and the Eurasian Dragon.	
4	Arsenal Affi	17 May 2019	SPW Atonement	Federation of Chinese Clan Associations, Singapore	1	68	On the day of SPW Vs. OWE: Oriental Storm, it was revealed that Arsenal Affi had to relinquish the title due to personal reasons.	
5	Destroyer Dharma	25 July 2019	SPW Vs. OWE: Oriental Storm	Federation of Chinese Clan Associations, Singapore	1	121	Destroyer Dharma defeated Aiden Rex and Da Butcherman in a three way match. Dharma won the title on his 33rd birthday.	
6	Da Butcherman	23 November 2019	SPW Into The Mist	The Pavillion, Singapore	1	1,098	Da Butcherman's reign is the longest in the history of this title and any of the titles in the SPW promotion. However, his reign was elongated due to the COVID-19 pandemic.	
7	Black Arrow	25 November 2022	SPW X: Astronomical Anniversary Day 2	Foochow Building, Singapore	1	266	This was a three-way match also involving Big T.	
8	Shivam	18 August 2023	SPW Valour	Foochow Building, Singapore	1	154	This was a three-way match also involving Monomoth.	
9	Black Arrow	19 January 2024	SPW Champions Never Yield 2	Foochow Building, Singapore	2	294	Black Arrow defeated Shivam to become the only person to ever hold the Singapore championship twice.	
10	CK Vin	8 November 2024	SPW Crowning Glory	Foochow Building, Singapore	1	518	CK Vin cashed in his number one contendership contract, pinning Black Arrow during his four-way match with Carlo Cannon, Dr. Gore and Ho Ho Lun.	
11	Dr. Gore	10 April 2026	SPW King's Landing	Foochow Building, Singapore	1	84		
12	Carlo Cannon	3 July 2026	SPW Reckoning	Foochow Building, Singapore	1	138+	Carlo Cannon defeated Dr. Gore via knockout, making history as the first-ever knockout victory in SPW and Southeast Asia.	

=== SPW Queen of Asia Championship ===
SPW Queen of Asia Championship

Details
- Promotion: Singapore Pro Wrestling
- Date established: 2017
- Current champion: Ms. Selina
- Date won: 3 July 2026
Statistics
- First champion: Kasey
- Longest reign: Riho (1,491 days)
- Shortest reign: Jibzy (69 days)
- Oldest champion: Alexis Lee (27 years, 123 days)
- Youngest champion: Kasey (20 years, 222 days)
- Heaviest champion: Jibzy (51 kg)
- Lightest champion: Riho (45 kg)

The SPW Queen of Asia Championship is the women's title of the Singapore Pro Wrestling promotion. The current champion is Ms. Selina who won the championship on the 3rd of July 2026. Kasey was the first champion and Riho holds the record for longest reign at 1307 days.

Key
No.	Overall reign number
Reign	Reign number for the specific champion
Days	Number of days held
<1	Reign lasted less than a day
+	Current reign is changing daily

No.	Champion	Championship change			Reign statistics		Notes	Ref.
No.	Champion	Date	Event	Location	Reign	Days	Notes	Ref.
1	Kasey	9 December 2017	SPW Wrestle The Odds III	Toa Payoh, Singapore	1	252	Defeated Alexis Lee and Crystal in a three-way match to become the inaugural champion.	
2	Jibzy	18 August 2018	WrestlingCity.Asia : One Night in Bangkok	Bangkok, Thailand	1	69	This was a four-way match, also involving Alexis Lee and Emi Sakura.	
3	Riho	26 October 2018	SPW Triple Thrill Extra: Unfinished Business - SPW Vs. Land's End	Singapore	1	1,491	After Riho won the title she would successfully defend it multiple times. However, in late 2019, she signed with All Elite Wrestling (AEW) where she would become their inaugural women's champion. Due to this, Riho was unable to defend the SPW Queen of Asia Championship until November of 2022, where she would lose to Alexis Lee.	
4	Alexis Lee	25 November 2022	SPW X: Astronomical Anniversary Day 2	Foochow Building, Singapore	1	364	This was a three-way match, also involving Mei Suruga.	
5	Yuki Kamifuku	24 November 2023	SPW Viva La Lucha	Foochow Building, Singapore	1	553		
6	Alexis Lee	30 May 2025	SPW Mayhem	Foochow Building, Singapore	2	399		
7	Ms. Selina	3 July 2026	SPW Reckoning	Foochow Building, Singapore	1	138+		

=== SPW Southeast Asian Tag Team Championships ===
SPW Southeast Asian Tag Team Championships

Details
- Promotion: Singapore Pro Wrestling
- Date established: 2014
- Current champion: Real Global Threat
- Date won: 10 April 2026
Statistics
- First champion: Onslaught
- Most reigns: Bad Company & The Horrors (2 reigns)
- Longest reign: Alexis Lee & Nyc (485 days)
- Shortest reign: Bad Company (30 days)

The SPW Southeast Asian Tag Team Championship are the tag team titles of the Singapore Pro Wrestling promotion. The title is currently held by Real Global Threat which consists of "The Statement" Andruew Tang, Shivam, Emman Azman, Jake de Leon and Chris Brookes. Onslaught, the duo of Andruew Tang and Trexxus were the first champions, and the duo of Alexis Lee and Nyc are the longest reigning champions at 485 days. This title has been vacated on three separate occasions.

Key
No.	Overall reign number
Reign	Reign number for the specific champion
Days	Number of days held
<1	Reign lasted less than a day
+	Current reign is changing daily

No.	Champion	Championship change			Reign statistics		Notes	Ref.
No.	Champion	Date	Event	Location	Reign	Days	Notes	Ref.
1	Onslaught (Kaiser Trexxus & "The Statement" Andruew Tang)	6 December 2014	SPW Breakthrough 2014	Bukit Gombak Sports Hall, Singapore	1	155	Onslaught defeated Affi & MK to win the inaugural titles. The titles were relinquished on the 10 of May 2015 due to Trexxus's national service commitments.	
2	Bad Company (Golem Thai & P-Nutz)	28 September 2016	GATOH MOVE PRO WRESTLING THAILAND "4 YEARS ANNIVERSARY"	Pridi Banomyoong Institute Auditorium, Bangkok, Thailand	1	30	Bad Company defeated HK All Stars (Ho Ho Lun & Jason Lee) to win the vacant titles.	
3	Mighty Arrow (Black Arrow & Mighty Mighty)	28 October 2016	SPW Wrestling City: Tropical Storm	Singapore	1	92		
4	Bad Company (Golem Thai & P-Nutz)	28 January 2017	SPW Unchained In Changi	Changi, Singapore	2	315	Bad Company became the first team to win the titles twice.	
5	Affi & MK	9 December 2017	SPW Wrestle The Odds III	Toa Payoh, Singapore	1	62		
6	Mighty Dragon (The Eurasian Dragon & Mighty Mighty)	9 February 2018	SPW Repentless	Singapore	1	259	Mighty Mighty became the first and only wrestler to win these titles twice, with two different partners.	
7	GM Carl Hella & Power Warrior	26 October 2018	SPW Triple Thrill Extra: Unfinished Business - SPW Vs. Land's End	Singapore	1	203		
8	The Horrors (Da Butcherman & Dr. Gore)	17 May 2019	SPW Atonement	Singapore, Singapore	1	69	On the 25th of July, 2019, The Horrors relinquished the titles due to Dr. Gore suffering a knee injury.	
9	Alexis Lee & Nyc	9 June 2021	SPW Prove Alive and Kicking	Singapore	1	485	Lee & Nyc defeated Axel Sun & BGJ to win the vacant titles. Their reign is the longest in the history of this title. However, their reign was elongated due to the COVID-19 pandemic. Due to Nyc sustaining an injury, this title was vacated on the 7th of October, 2022.	
10	Calamari Drunken Kings (Masa Takanashi & Chris Brookes)	24 November 2022	SPW X: Astronomical Anniversary Day 1	Foochow Building, Singapore	1	421	CDK defeated The Horrors to win the vacant tag team championships	
11	The Horrors (Da Butcherman & Dr. Gore)	19 January 2024	SPW Champions Never Yield 2	Foochow Building, Singapore	2	302	The title match was originally CDK vs The Horrors but Chris Brookes was replaced by Harashima due to surgery.	
12	The Juicy Boyz (Miles Karu & The Wonderboy)	16 November 2024	MYPW Champion's Quest	KuAsh Theatre TTDI, Kuala Lumpur, Malaysia	1	195		
13	Jack 'N' Cheese (BGJ & CBK)	30 May 2025	SPW Mayhem	Foochow Building, Singapore	1	315		
14	Real Global Threat("The Statement" Andruew Tang, Emman Azman)	10 April 2026	SPW King's Landing	Foochow Building, Singapore	1	222+	Real Global Threat will defend the title under the Freebird Rule	

=== SPW Hardcore Championship ===
SPW Hardcore Championship

Details
- Promotion: Singapore Pro Wrestling
- Date established: October 7, 2022
- Current champion: Ma$on
- Date won: 10 April 2026
Statistics
- First champion: Destroyer Dharma
- Most reigns: Destroyer Dharma (3 reigns)
- Longest reign: Big T & Bryson Blade (350 days)
- Shortest reign: Several people (<1 day)
- Oldest champion: Destroyer Dharma (36 years old)
- Youngest champion: Bryson Blade (21 years old)

The SPW Hardcore Championship, formerly known as SPW NBCB Championship and SPW 24/7 Championship, is the Hardcore title of the Singapore Pro Wrestling promotion and the title must be defended under no disqualification rules. Ma$on is the current Hardcore Champion. Destroyer Dharma holds the record for most reigns at 3, and Big T and Bryson Blade holds the record for longest reign.

Key
No.	Overall reign number
Reign	Reign number for the specific champion
Days	Number of days held
<1	Reign lasted less than a day
+	Current reign is changing daily

No.	Champion	Championship change			Reign statistics		Notes	Ref.
No.	Champion	Date	Event	Location	Reign	Days	Notes	Ref.
1	Destroyer Dharma	7 October 2022	SPW: Cream of the Crop	SFCCA, Singapore	1	48		
2	Kelly Kimberly	24 November 2022	SPW X: Astronomical Anniversary Day 1	Foochow Building, Singapore	1	<1		
3	Destroyer Dharma	24 November 2022	SPW X: Astronomical Anniversary Day 1	Foochow Building, Singapore	2	1		
4	Meta	25 November 2022	SPW X: Astronomical Anniversary Day 2	Foochow Building, Singapore	1	<1		
5	BGJ	25 November 2022	SPW X: Astronomical Anniversary Day 2	Foochow Building, Singapore	1	<1		
6	Destroyer Dharma	25 November 2022	SPW X: Astronomical Anniversary Day 2	Foochow Building, Singapore	3	266		
7	Big T	18 August 2023	SPW Valour	Foochow Building, Singapore	1	98	This was a six-way match also involving CBK, CK Vin, John Day and Meta.	
8	Mr Frois	24 November 2023	SPW Viva La Lucha	Foochow Building, Singapore	1	<1	Mr Frois pinned Big T moments after the Battle Royale match.	
9	Darren	24 November 2023	SPW Viva La Lucha	Foochow Building, Singapore	1	<1		
10	Big T	24 November 2023	SPW Viva La Lucha	Foochow Building, Singapore	2	350		
11	Referee Ryan	8 November 2024	SPW Crowning Glory	Foochow Building, Singapore	1	<1	This was a seven-man battle royale that also involved Viral, Riz, Sayn RH, Kyle Black and Emman.	
12	Bryson Blade	8 November 2024	SPW Crowning Glory	Foochow Building, Singapore	1	350	Blade pinned Ryan moments after the match.	
13	Ryan Shen	24 October 2025	SPW Hardcore Island 3	Foochow Building, Singapore	2	168	Ryan Shen was formerly known as Referee Ryan.	
14	Ma$on	10 April 2026	SPW King's Landing	Foochow Building, Singapore	1	222+	This was in a five-way match also involving Ray, Tok Bomoh Mekong and Riz	

== See also ==
- List of professional wrestling promotions
- List of Singaporean male professional wrestlers
- List of Singaporean female professional wrestlers
