= Ho Ho Lun =

Hong Kong professional wrestler

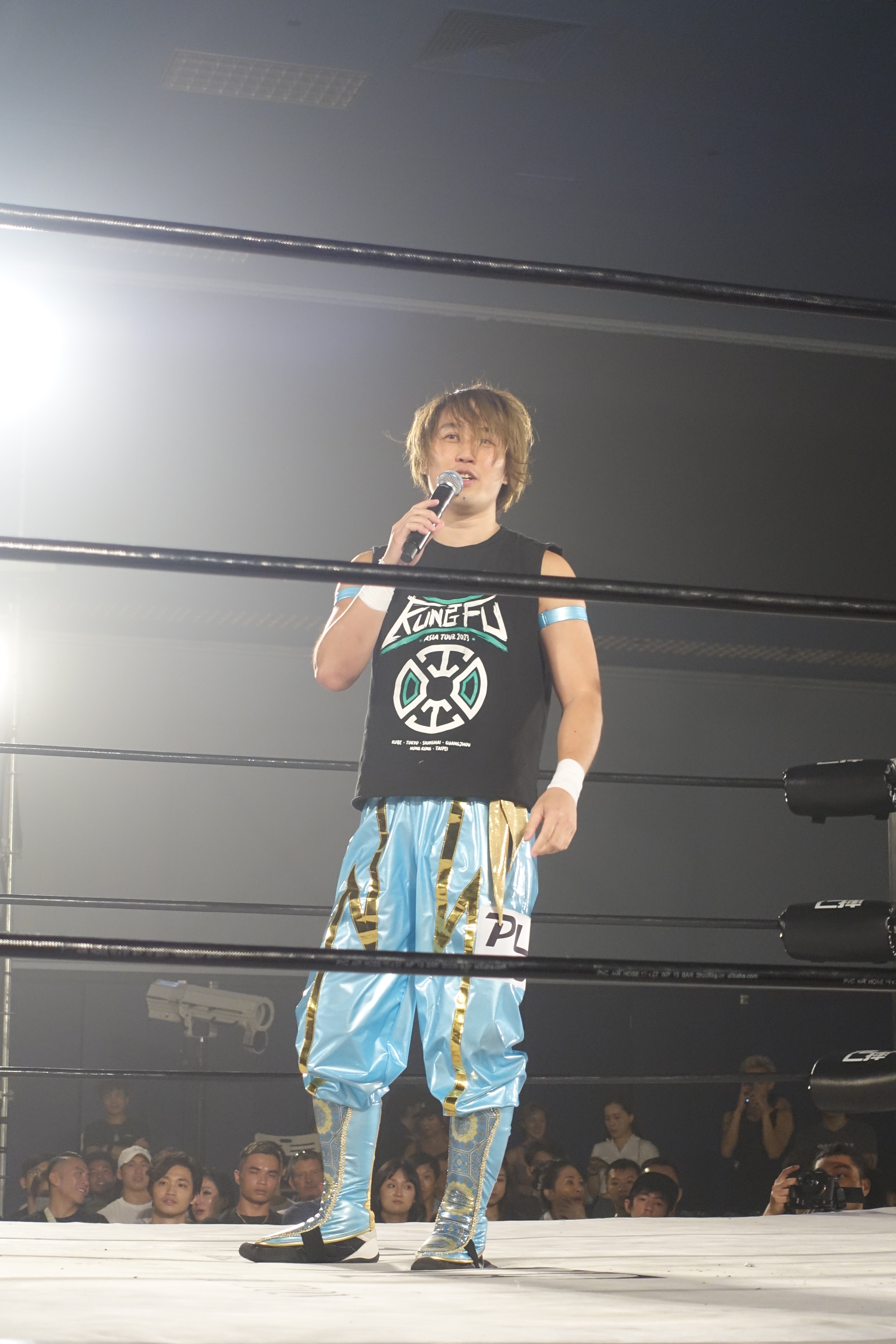
- Ho Ho Lun in September 2023

Personal information
- Born: Wong Yuk Lun; July 19, 1987 (age 39) British Hong Kong

Professional wrestling career
- Ring name(s): HoHo Lun; Ho Ho Lun
- Billed height: 5 ft 7 in (1.70 m)
- Billed weight: 155 lb (70 kg)
- Billed from: Tai Po, Hong Kong
- Trained by: David Sharp; The Slam
- Debut: June 6, 2009

Wong Yuk Lun (born July 19, 1987), better known by his ring name Ho Ho Lun (Hoholun, 何顥麟), is a Hong Kong professional wrestler. He is signed to Dragongate. He is best known for his time with WWE, where he competed in their Cruiserweight Classic tournament and in their developmental territory NXT. He is the founder of the Hong Kong Pro-Wrestling Federation, Hong Kong's first professional wrestling promotion. Ho has also competed in various independent promotions in Japan, mainland China, Taiwan, Singapore, and Europe.

== Professional wrestling career ==
=== Early career (2009) ===
After being influenced by the stars of the World Wrestling Federation and New Japan Pro-Wrestling, Lun decided to pursue a career as a professional wrestler, but was unable to do it in Hong Kong as there were no professional wrestling schools or promotions. He travelled to Guangzhou, China to begin his professional wrestling journey at the China Wrestling Entertainment (CWE) promotion.

=== Hong Kong Pro-Wrestling Federation (HKWF) (2009–2023) ===
After travelling back and forth from Guangzhou to Hong Kong every week for two years, Ho decided to open a wrestling gym of his own in his homeland of Hong Kong. He founded Hong Kong Pro-Wrestling Federation and launched its gym in Shatin, Hong Kong, where he and other Hong Kong wrestlers had been training. Notable wrestlers from the gym include Jason Lee, Ladybeard, and Bit Man. The group had their first show on June 6, 2009, this event served as a starting point for the sport of professional wrestling in Hong Kong. In 2012, Lun challenged Jason Lee for the AWGC Junior Heavyweight Championship but fell short. In 2015, he formed a new stable call Outer Space with fellow Hong Kong wrestlers Jeff Man, Kevin Man, Ham Sap Chan and Beijing wrestler Gao Yuan. On 26 June 2016, a few days after he debut for the WWE Cruiserweight Classic, he defeated Jason Lee to become Hong Kong's AWGC Jr Heavyweight Champion. On December 31, 2016, he defeated M.A. in Dongguan, China for his first championship defense. However, on January 8, 2017, he failed on his second defense of his championship in Hong Kong and was defeated by Dai Ten Z. In 2022, Lun officially stepped down from his positions as lead producer and promoter of HKWF. He subsequently departed the company entirely, handing over all remaining duties to a new generation of leadership to focus on his wrestling career and other professional ventures

=== Asian independent circuit (2010–present) ===
Ho Ho Lun's first match outside Hong Kong took place for Taiwan Wrestling Taipei (TWT) at an event held in Taiwan in 2010. Since 2010, Lun has wrestled for many other companies in Taiwan including Impact Wrestling Love (IWL) and New Taiwan Wrestling (NTW). Lun has challenged for the NTW Tag Team Championship on multiple occasions. In 2014 and 2015, Ho Ho Lun toured in Chongqing, China for Crazy League Pro Wrestling. He is also a regular roster member of mainland China based wrestling companies China Wrestling Entertainment (CWE) and Middle Kingdom Wrestling (MKW). In August 2017, he worked with a casino complex in Macau and established Macau Wrestling Association (MWA). Alongside a number of Hong Kong wrestlers, the MWA also had a team of Mexican wrestlers. He wrestled in shows everyday until the MWA decided to fold up in January 2018. On 17 March 2018, he defeated Sam Gradwell, Buffa and Gao Yuan in a 4-way match to become the first ever Guangzhou-based wrestling promotion King of Pro Wrestling (KOPW) Champion. In the same year, he start wrestling for Manila Wrestling Federation in the Philippines where he become a regular roster. On 27 July 2019, he defeated Robin Sane to become MWF Champion. Ho Ho Lun wrestled for Singaporean promotion, Ring of Rebirth, teaming with Big T, however losing to the duo of Erfie and DJ Kal, in August 2022.

=== European independent circuit (2010–2013, 2015, 2019, 2024) ===
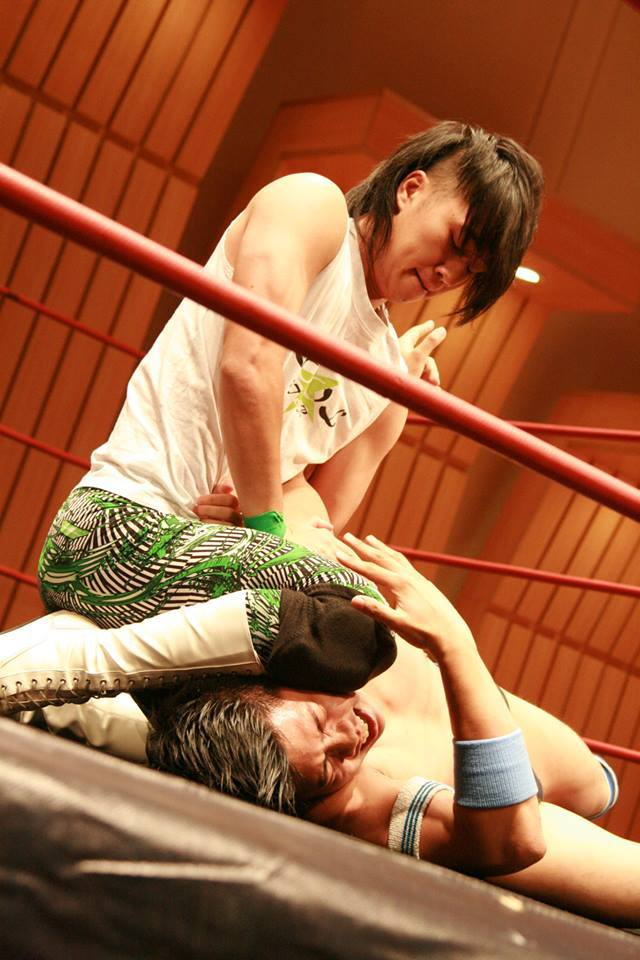
Ho Ho Lun applying an armbar.

Ho Ho Lun first traveled to the United Kingdom in 2010, training with the 4 Front Wrestling promotion. In 2011, he traveled to the UK for a second time, this time staying in the nation for six months. During his 2011 tour in the UK, Lun wrestled for 4FW, Triple X Wrestling (TXW), Pro Wrestling Live (PWL) and other independent promotions. The most notable match of his 2011 tour was a BWE Championship match in Essex. In 2013, Ho Ho Lun return to the UK again and wrestled in a various promotions, including Attack Pro Wrestling, Wu-Tech Wrestling and Fight Club Pro. During his 2013 European trip, Lun also wrestled in Spain and Portugal. In 2015, Lun returned to Europe for a short two week tour, wrestling in Portugal and in England for Pro Wrestling Pride where he would challenge for the PWP Catch Division Championship in a fatal-4-way. In Summer 2019, he returned to the UK for a short tour of two months where he wrestled for a number of promotions including Southside Pro Wrestling, NORTH Pro Wrestling and Futureshock Pro Wrestling.

In January 2024, Lun returned to the United Kingdom to compete for British Kingdom Wrestling, formerly known as 4FW, the promotion where he originally began his wrestling training. During this stint, he competed in four matches, securing victories over Jay Joshua, Saint, and Curt Atlas. His undefeated run on the tour ended when he fell short in a match against Eddie Ryan. This return highlighted his continued activity in the European circuit alongside his primary commitments in Asia.

=== Chinese promotions (2012-present) ===
Across more than a decade of competition in Mainland China, Ho Ho Lun has been one of the region’s most active and influential international wrestlers, appearing for major promotions including Middle Kingdom Wrestling (MKW), China Wrestling Entertainment (CWE), King of Pro Wrestling (KOPW), and multiple independent circuits. Lun’s China tenure features several championship achievements, beginning with his victory in 2018, when he defeated Sam Gradwell to win the KOPW Championship, marking one of the earliest internationally‑recognized title wins in the Mainland scene. He later continued his prominence in MKW, culminating in his MKW World Championship win on 18 May 2025, defeating The Slam in a featured main event. Beyond title matches, Lun wrestled extensively in China during its formative years, appearing in showcase bouts that helped establish China’s first modern wrestling circuit, and took part in MKW and KOPW cross‑border cards that blended Chinese and international talent. Through championship success, international showcase matches, and continuous activity across multiple promotions, Lun has become recognized as a central bridge between Chinese wrestling and the broader Asian scene, contributing significantly to the development and visibility of professional wrestling in China.

=== Japanese promotions (2012–2018) ===
Ho Ho Lun's first match at a Japanese wrestling event occurred in 2012, when he participated in the Pro Wrestling Zero1 (Zero1) Tenkaichi Jr Tournament. Lun was eliminated in the first round by Irish wrestler Sean Guinness. Lun returned to Zero1 in 2014, where he wrestled primarily on the promotion's events held in North-Eastern Japan. During his 2014 Japanese tour, Lun would also wrestle for longtime Japanese independent group Michinoku Pro Wrestling. In 2016, Lun returned to Japan for the first time in two years, wrestling in Yokohama for Land's End Pro Wrestling.

=== Singapore Pro Wrestling (2013–present) ===
Ho Ho Lun debuted in Singapore Pro Wrestling in early 2013, taking part in some of SPW's first public events where he defeated The Eurasian Dragon in his first match and lost to "The Statement" Andruew Tang in his second match. Lun returned to SPW in March 2014 where he was defeated by Trexxus at SPW Prove 2. In February 2015 at SPW Prove 3, Lun and Bitman attempted to win the SPW SEA Tag Team Championships, but lost to defending champions Onslaught, Tang and Trexxus. In May at Prove 4, Lun lost his AWGC Junior Heavyweight Championship to Andruew Tang. Lun returned to SPW in December, teaming with Jason Lee to defeat GST, the team of Dave Vindictus and Greg Glorious. In March 2016, Lun would team with the Man Brothers to defeat Eurasian Dragon, Black Arrow and Mighty Mighty. In May, Lun teamed with Bitman, Jason Lee and King Michael to represent Team HKWF defeating Team Singapore which consisted of Dragon, Arrow, Mighty and Aerial Sniper Nick. After a 1.5 year absence, Lun returned to SPW to compete in a three-way tag team match. Lun teamed with Dai Tin Z, ultimately losing to Team Technique. In June 2018, Lun successfully defended his KOPW Championship against Power Warrior. After signing with Dragon Gate and due to the COVID-19 pandemic, Lun would be absent from SPW for over three years. Lun made his return to SPW in November 2022 at SPW X: Astronomical Anniversary. On Day 1, Lun attempted to win the SPW SEA Championship, ultimately losing to champion Aiden Rex. On Day 2, Chris Brookes issued an open challenge which was met by Lun. The match was based around a bet, dubbed the "20 Dollar Match", as the winner got money to buy two pints. Lun would lose the match to Brookes. Lun later appeared again on 30 May 2025 at SPW Mayhem, teaming with Emman Azman in a Dragon Gate Rules Tag Team Match against Real Global Threat (Shivam & The Statement), further highlighting his ongoing relationship with the promotion and his role as a recurring international representative.

=== WWE (2016–2017) ===
Ho Ho Lun was a participant in the 2016 WWE Cruiserweight Classic tournament. The tournament began on June 23 with Lun defeating Ariya Daivari in his first round match. On July 14, Lun was eliminated from the tournament by Noam Dar.

On October 2, Lun was announced for NXT's 2016 Dusty Rhodes Tag Team Classic, teaming with Tian Bing. Lun and Bing were eliminated from the tournament by Johnny Gargano and Tommaso Ciampa. On November 2, Lun was announced as a roster member for the cruiserweight-centric 205 Live show.

Lun made an appearance on the March 8, 2017, episode of NXT, in a losing effort against Andrade "Cien" Almas. On the June 28 episode of NXT, Lun was defeated by The Velveteen Dream, which would be his final appearance for WWE. On August 3, WWE announced that Lun had requested and was granted his release from his WWE contract, to care for his ailing mother.

=== Development of Professional Wrestling in Macau (2017–2019) ===
In 2017, Lun expanded his promotional efforts into Macau, collaborating with Rosco Entertainment to establish a consistent professional wrestling presence in the region. Operating out of the Golden Dragon Hotel, he served as both a producer and an active competitor for the Macau Wrestling Association (MWA), where he oversaw the production of daily wrestling events. These daily shows ran until early 2018 and featured a diverse roster of athletes, including wrestlers from Hong Kong and Mexico.

Lun reached a significant milestone in the Macau market in 2018 by partnering with Cai Liangcan, an Olympic gold medalist and a prominent figure in the local martial arts community. Together, they produced Extreme Wrestling Entertainment (EWE), a major event held at the Broadway Macau. On January 22, 2019, the production achieved considerable commercial success, drawing a live audience of over 3,000 spectators and attracting more than one million viewers through digital live streaming. In the event's main event, Lun teamed with Cai Liangcan to defeat the team led by Japanese veteran and former World Heavyweight Champion Ryoji Sai.

=== Dragon Gate (2018–present) ===
Ho Ho Lun first participation with Dragon Gate Pro Wrestling was in 2018 where Dragon Gate ran their first ever Hong Kong event. He was a regular roster for their Hong Kong tour. In October 2019, he toured for Dragon Gate Japan for the first time. He wrestled for opening matches in most of the shows. Starting from August 2020, along with Jae Church, Ho Ho Lun become part of the English commentator team for Dragon Gate Network. On 16 December 2020, Ho Ho Lun defeated Punch Tominaga to score his first single match victory in Dragon Gate.

Lun has remained a consistent presence on the Dragon Gate roster, frequently competing for the promotion's championships. On October 16, 2022, he teamed with Jacky "Funky" Kamei and Super Shenlong under the M3K stable banner to challenge for the Open the Triangle Gate Championship, though the team was unsuccessful in securing the titles. Lun later transitioned into singles title contention, and on May 17, 2024, he challenged Hyo for the Open the Brave Gate Championship. Despite a competitive performance, Lun was unable to defeat Hyo for the title.

Lun deepened his commitment to Dragon Gate Pro Wrestling in Japan, taking on a multi-faceted role within the organization. Leveraging his extensive experience in the international wrestling scene, he was appointed as the head of overseas relations for the promotion. In this capacity, he serves as the primary liaison for international talent and manages global partnerships, playing a key role in expanding the promotion's reach outside of Japan. Additionally, Lun became a central figure for the Dragon Gate Network, the company’s official streaming service, where he serves as a lead commentator for the English-language broadcasts.

=== All Elite Wrestling (2021) ===
Ho Ho Lun made his All Elite Wrestling debut on 28 December 2021 on an episode of AEW Dark where he would lose a singles match to Sammy Guevara.

== Championships and accomplishments ==
- Hong Kong Pro Wrestling Federation
  - AWGC Junior Heavyweight Championship (1 time)
- King of Pro-Wrestling
  - KOPW Championship (1 time)
  - KOPW Title Tournament (2018)
- Middle Kingdom Wrestling
  - MKW World Championship (1 time, current)
- Manila Wrestling Federation
  - MWF Championship (1 time)
- Pro Wrestling Illustrated
  - PWI ranked him #409 of the top 500 singles wrestlers in the PWI 500 in 2017

PWI ranked him 468 of the top 500 singles wrestler in the PWI500 in 2025
