= Dante Chen =

Singaporean professional wrestler (born 1996)

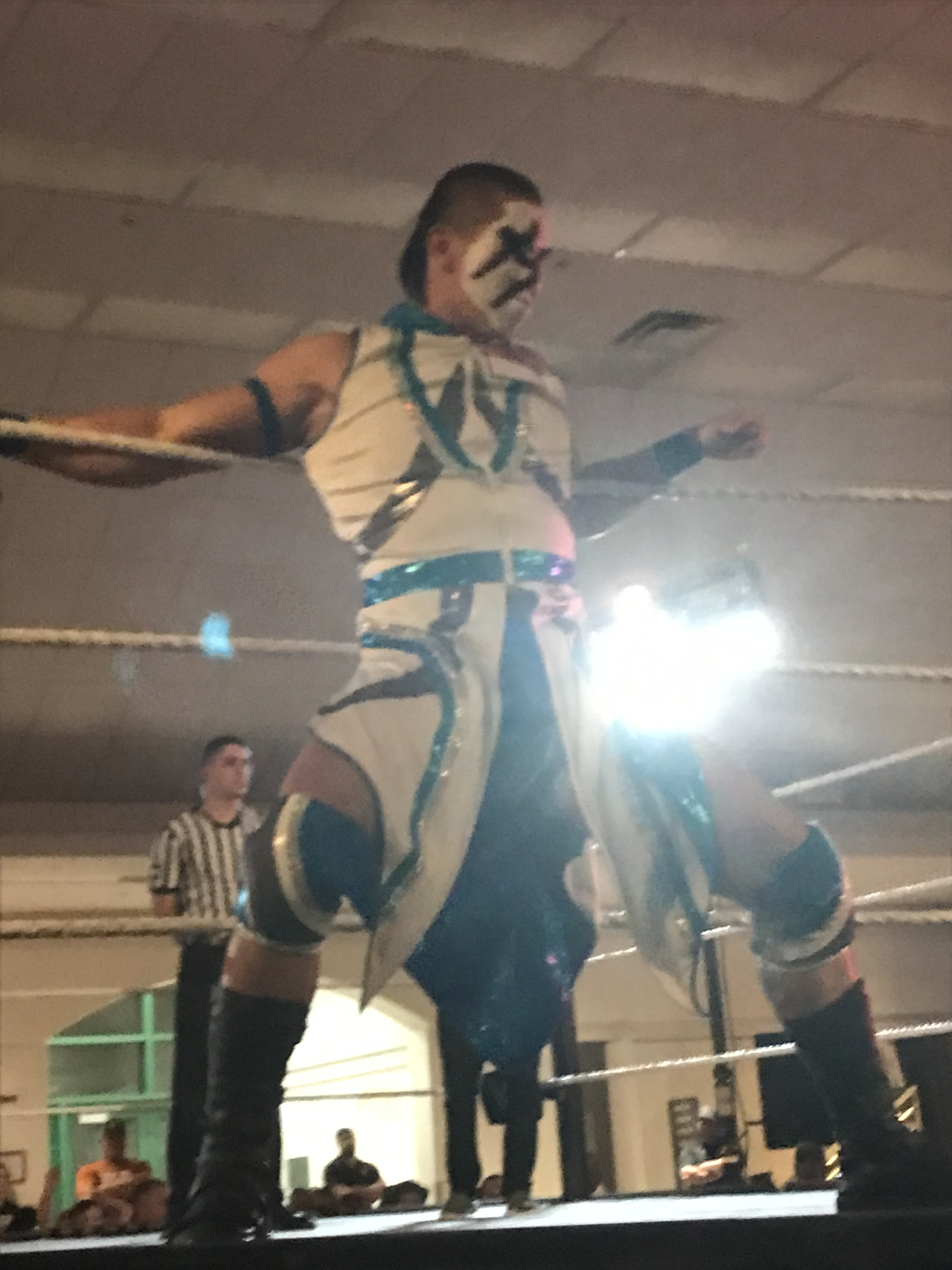
- Chen in 2024

Personal information
- Born: Sean Tan Li Hao; January 20, 1996 (age 30) Singapore
- Education: Republic Polytechnic; ITE College West

Professional wrestling career
- Ring name(s): Dante Chen; Kaiser Trexxus; Trexxus
- Billed height: 6 ft 0 in (183 cm)
- Billed weight: 215 lb (98 kg)
- Billed from: Singapore
- Trained by: Vadim Koryagin; Andruew Tang; WWE Performance Center
- Debut: February 2013
- Military service
- Allegiance: Singapore
- Branch: Singapore Army
- Service years: 2015–2017

Sean Tan Li Hao (born January 20, 1996) is a Singaporean professional wrestler. He is best known for being the first Singaporean and Southeast Asian wrestler signed to the WWE, where he performed under the ring name Dante Chen.

== Early life ==
Sean Tan Li Hao was born in Singapore on January 20, 1996. Tan grew up in Woodlands. As a child, his elder brother introduced him to WWE video games, sparking his interest in professional wrestling. Tan attended Assumption English School for secondary education and later earned a certificate in Business at ITE College West. From 2015 to 2017, Tan served in the Singapore Army. After completing his military service, he earned a diploma in Health Management and Promotion from Republic Polytechnic in 2020.

== Professional wrestling career ==
=== Singapore Pro Wrestling (2013–2021) ===
==== Early career and Onslaught (2013–2016) ====
Tan joined Singapore Pro Wrestling (SPW) in January 2013, as a trainee after running into SPW founder Andruew Tang at a gym. Tan trained under SPW founders Tang and Vadim Koryagin, debuting as Trexxus on 31 January at SPW New Year Rumble against Sebastian Turini after just 4 weeks of training. This set the national record for the fastest debut, which stood for over 9 years until Varun Khanna broke it in 2022. His parents were initially unsupportive, believing wrestling was too violent, they eventually came around after seeing his dedication and passion.

In 2014, Trexxus teamed with Tang to form Onslaught. The duo won the inaugural SPW Tag Team Championship by defeating MK & Affi at SPW: Breakthrough. Onslaught defended their title against Bit Man and Ho Ho Lun at SPW Prove 3. However, on 10 May 2015, they relinquished the championships due to Trexxus's national service commitments. The duo were joined by Destroyer Dharma, who become an ally of Trexxus.

==== SPW Southeast Asian Champion (2017–2018) ====
In January 2017, Trexxus defeated his former tag partner Tang at SPW Unchained In Changi to become the youngest SPW Southeast Asian Champion at 21. In 2017, Trexxus retained his SPW Championship by defeating Jason Lee in March, Masahiro Takanashi in October, and EK Baki in December. In February 2018, Trexxus faced Lokomotiv, but was disqualified after striking him with the title belt. GM Carl Hella restarted the match as a chairs match, where Lokomotiv defeated Trexxus to win the SEA Championship.

==== Championship pursuits and final feuds (2018–2021) ====
In 2018, Trexxus teamed with Tang and Aiden Rex to defeat the trio of Pete Dunne, Wolfgang and Mark Davis in a 3 on 3 match. In his final years in SPW, he chased the SPW SEA Championship many times, participating in rivalries with Aiden Rex and The Statement. At SPW Atonement, Trexxus attempted to reclaim the SEA Championship in a four-way match against Jake de Leon, Lokomotiv, and Tang, but Tang won. In 2019, Trexxus teamed with Tang and Da Butcherman to face Cima, Shaolin Monk, and Kenny Omega, but later that year, he and Butcherman lost to Tang in a three-way SEA title match. In February 2020, Trexxus faced Aiden Rex in his final live SPW match. At SPW Prove: Alive & Kicking #1, Dharma turned on Onslaught, teaming with Aiden Rex to defeat Tang and Trexxus. Trexxus's final SPW match came behind closed doors due to the COVID-19 pandemic. In May 2021, he lost a Title vs. Career match to The Statement, ending his nearly nine-year run in SPW.

=== WWE (2021–2026) ===
In 2019, Tan was invited for a WWE tryout in Shanghai alongside Andruew Tang and Alexis Lee. He was recruited immediately after the tryout.

Tan debuted on September 22, 2021 on the NXT brand under the ring name Dante Chen, winning his first match against Trey Baxter on NXT 2.0. Dante Chen debuted on the 205 Live brand on October 1, 2021, defeating Malik Blade. On March 13, 2023, Chen made his debut on Main Event, where Cedric Alexander defeated him. In April, Chen formed an alliance with Boa but they only had one match as a tag team before Boa was released the following year in May, ending the alliance. On February 16, 2024 episode of SmackDown, Chen made his main roster debut where he lost to Bron Breakker in a squash match. On the July 16 episode of NXT, Chen competed in his first championship match against NXT Champion Ethan Page but failed to win the title.

On the June 25, 2025 episode of Evolve, Evolve Prime Minister Stevie Turner announced that Chen has signed with the Evolve brand. On the July 23 episode of Evolve, Chen lost to Edris Enofé in his first match in Evolve. On the March 18, 2026 episode of Evolve, Chen lost to Kam Hendrix in what would be his final match for WWE. Chen was released on April 24, ending his five-year tenure with the promotion.

=== Total Nonstop Action Wrestling (2024) ===
On the August 8, 2024 episode of TNA Impact!, Tan made his Total Nonstop Action Wrestling (TNA) debut as Dante Chen as part of WWE's partnership with TNA. He participated in the Ultimate X qualifying match which was won by The Rascalz's Zachary Wentz which also involved KC Navarro.

=== Pro Wrestling Noah (2026) ===
On August 11, 2026, Pro Wrestling Noah announced Tan's participation in the 2026 N-1 Victory tournament under the ring name Chen, taking on Takashi Sugiura, Kazuyuki Fujita and Shane Haste.

== Personal life ==
Tan's favorite wrestler is Shawn Michaels. Tan has also said that he enjoys the work of The Miz and wishes to have a match with him.

Tan lived in Singapore for 25 years until 2021, when he relocated to Orlando, Florida after being signed by WWE.

Tan's father, Patrick Tan died on 8 November 2021.

== Championships and accomplishments ==
- Pro Wrestling Illustrated
  - Ranked No. 377 of the top 500 singles wrestlers in the PWI 500 in 2024
- Singapore Pro Wrestling
  - SPW Southeast Asian Championship (2 times, current)
  - SPW Southeast Asian Tag Team Championships (1 time) – with Andruew Tang
