= Danie Dharma =

Singaporean professional wrestler

- Born: Danie Dharma; July 25, 1986 (age 40); Singapore
- Occupations: Bodybuilder; Professional wrestler
- Professional wrestling career
- Ring name: Destroyer Dharma
- Billed height: 5 ft 7 in (171 cm)
- Billed weight: 220 lb (100 kg)
- Billed from: Singapore
- Military service
- Allegiance: Singapore
- Branch: Republic of Singapore Navy
- Service years: 2006–2016
- Rank: Staff Sergeant

Danie Dharma (born July 25, 1986) is a Singaporean bodybuilder and professional wrestler. He was the winner of several beauty pageants such as the 2016 Mr. Singapore and 2017 Mr. Singapore Classic. He was also the 2017 Asian Championship Classic Physique winner and the 2023 NPC Worldwide Singapore Men's Bodybuilding winner. Dharma also performs under the ring name Destroyer Dharma at Singapore Pro Wrestling (SPW) and was a one time SPW Singapore Champion and three times SPW Nothing But Cheeseburgers (NBCB) Championship.

== Early life ==
Danie Dharma was born in Singapore on July 25, 1986. He was bullied as a child, due to his small size and stature, and the fact that he was an ethnic minority, being the only Indian Singaporean in a majority Chinese Singaporean environment. To prevent being bullied, Dharma took up bodybuilding in 2001.

== Bodybuilding career ==
From 2005 to 2010, Dharma won various local bodybuilding competitions. During 2012 to 2016, Dharma won four Singapore National Bodybuilding Championships. In 2016, Dharma would win the title of Mr. Singapore. Dharma won the inaugural Mr. Singapore Classic competition in 2017. During 2017, Dharma won the Asian Championship Classic Physique.

In 2018, Dharma was a finalist of the Singapore Men's Health Cover Guy contest. He would also win the World Regional Championships Classic Physique Class B Category.

In 2023, Dharma would make a return to bodybuilding after a long hiatus due to him pursuing his professional wrestling career and COVID-19. He competed in the NPC Worldwide Singapore Showdown in February 2023, where he was crowned light heavyweight and overall winner in men's bodybuilding.

== Professional wrestling career ==
=== Singapore Pro Wrestling (2016-present) ===
Dharma made his debut in 2016, to aid Andruew Tang, in his match against Cima. Later that year, Dharma made his in-ring debut under the ring name, Destroyer Dharma, where he beat Rowdy Ranga. Dharma would go on to be the "muscle" for the faction Onslaught, which previously consisted of Tang and Dante Chen (Trexxus). In 2018, Dharma wrestled in a charity event for Singapore's migrant workers. In July 2019, Dharma was attacked by Da Butcherman, at a local gym, in a publicity stunt. During July, Dharma defeated Aiden Rex and Butcherman in a three-way match to win the SPW Singapore Championship, becoming its 5th champion.

In November 2019, Dharma participated in a three-way match against Black Arrow, and Butcherman, where he would lose the Singapore Championship to Butcherman. His feud continued as he lost to Butcherman, for the second time, in a no-disqualification match. At SPW Prove: Alive & Kicking #1, Dharma would turn on Onslaught, teaming with Aiden Rex to defeat Tang and Trexxus. In July 2022, Dharma would team with BGJ to defeat CIMA and Issei Onitsuka. In October, Dharma would win the NBCB Battle Royal to become the inaugural SPW NBCB Champion. At SPW X: Astronomical Anniversary Day 1, Dharma would lose the NBCB belt to Kelly Kimberly. He would pin her after the match to win back his championship. On Day 2, Dharma would lose his title to Meta. Later that night, Dharma would defeat BGJ to win the NBCB Championship for the third time.

== Personal life ==
From 2006 to 2016, Dharma served in the Republic of Singapore Navy as a Weapon Control Specialist attaining the rank of Staff Sergeant. Dharma is also a personal trainer.

== Championships and accomplishments ==
=== Bodybuilding ===
- Muscle Storm 2006 below 70 kg category Champion
- Muscle Explosion I 2007 below 21years old Champion
- Muscle Explosion II 2009 below 70 kg Champion
- Muscle Explosion III 2010 Junior above 70 kg Champion
- Muscle Explosion III 2010 Classic above 170 cm Champion
- Singapore National Bodybuilding Championships 2012 below 75 kg Champion
- Singapore National Bodybuilding Championships 2012 Classic above 165 cm Champion
- Singapore National Bodybuilding Championships 2015 Men's open below 80 kg Champion
- Singapore National Bodybuilding Championships 2016 Men's open below 85 kg Champion
- Mr. Singapore 2016
- Mr. Singapore Classic 2017
- Asian Championship Classic Physique 2017
- World Regional Championships Classic Physique Class B Category 2018
- NPC Worldwide Singapore Men's Bodybuilding Light Heavyweight 2023 Winner
- NPC Worldwide Singapore Men's Bodybuilding 2023 Overall Winner

=== Professional Wrestling ===
- Singapore Pro Wrestling
  - SPW Singapore Championship (1 time)
  - SPW NBCB Championship (3 times)
