= Andruew Tang =

Singaporean professional wrestler

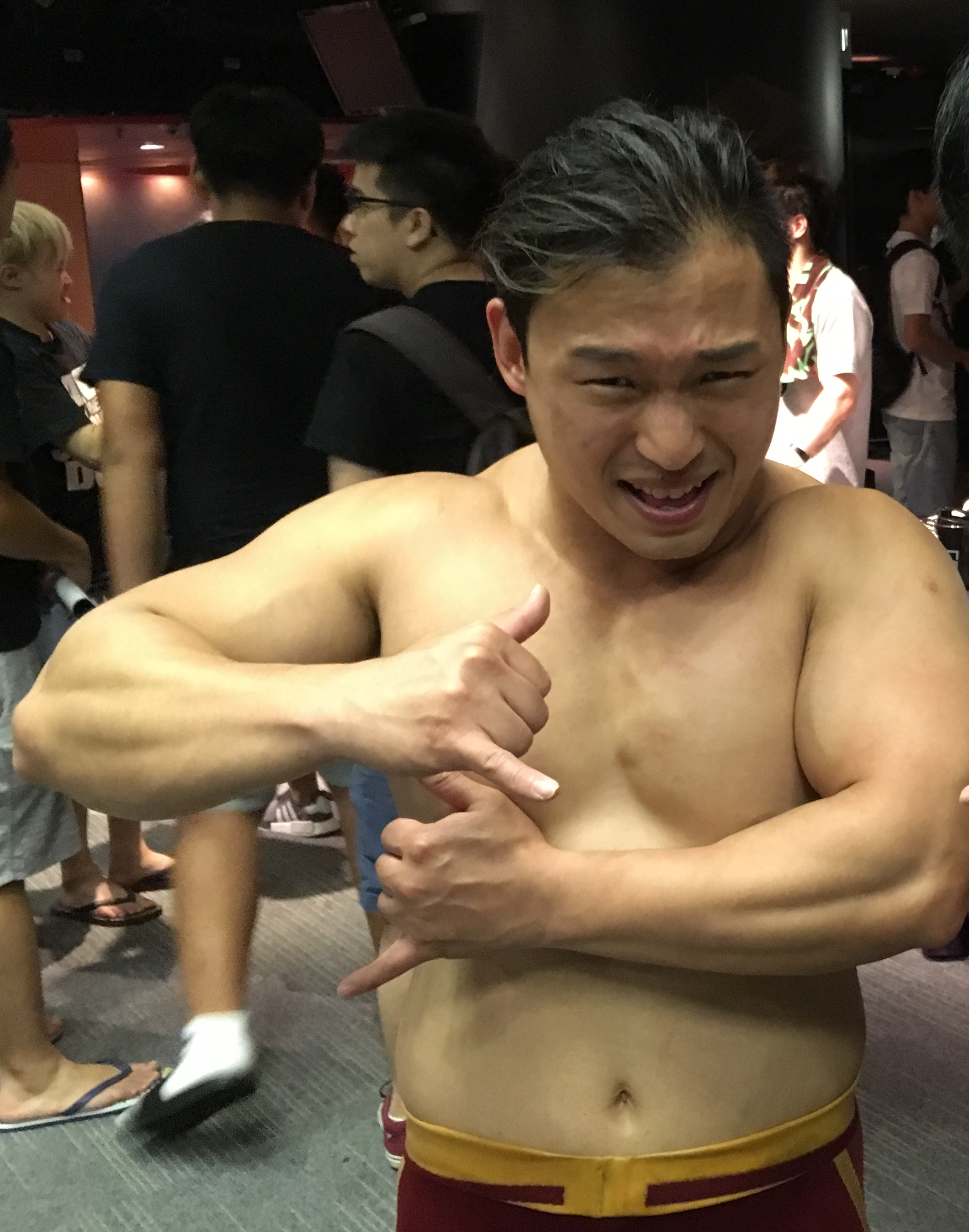
- Andruew Tang in July 2017
- Born: Andruew Tang You Liang; 28 February 1989 (age 37); Singapore
- Occupations: Professional wrestler; Professional wrestling promoter; Professional wrestling coach
- Professional wrestling career
- Ring name: "The Statement" Andruew Tang Andruew Tang The Statement
- Billed height: 5 ft 4 in (162 cm)
- Billed weight: 165 lb (75 kg)
- Billed from: Singapore

Andruew Tang You Liang (born 28 February 1989) is a Singaporean professional wrestler. He is the co-founder and head coach of Singapore Pro Wrestling, where he also performs as a wrestler under the ring name "The Statement" Andruew Tang. He is the first Singaporean professional wrestler. Tang is a record five-time and SPW Southeast Asian Champion and is also the championship's longest reigning with a record of 862 days in his fourth reign. Tang frequents the Japanese wrestling scene, and has primarily performed for Gatoh Move Pro Wrestling while also appearing on multiple promotions including NJPW, Dragon Gate and Gleat.

== Early life ==
Tang was born in Singapore on 28 February 1989. At the age of 12, Tang watched pro wrestling for the first time and fell in love with it. Tang would decide that he wanted to become a professional wrestler, however he struggled as professional wrestling was nonexistent in Singapore. Tang would serve in the Singapore Armed Forces, where he would be selected for Officer Cadet School.

== Professional wrestling career ==
=== Singapore Pro Wrestling ===
==== Early career and Onslaught (2012–2015) ====
In 2011, Tang, an aspiring professional wrestler, attended a talk by Vadim Koryagin, a Russian businessman and owner of Independent Wrestling Federation (IWF), a Russia-based promotion. Together the two would form the nation's first pro wrestling promotion, Singapore Pro Wrestling in February 2012. They would begin to train the first generation of Singaporean professional wrestlers, including Tang, who would become "The Statement" Andruew Tang, Singapore's first professional wrestler along with, Kaiser Trexxus, Alexis Lee, Dr. Gore and The Eurasian Dragon.

Tang debuted on 4 October 2012, losing to Steve Ultra. In 2014 Tang teamed with Trexxus forming a tag team known as Onslaught. The duo would win the inaugural SPW Tag Team Championship, defeating MK & Affi at SPW: Breakthrough. Tang defeated Bitman in December 2014, winning the AWGC Junior Heavyweight Championship. Onslaught would defend their title against Bit Man and Ho Ho Lun at SPW Prove 3. On 10 May 2015, Onslaught was forced to relinquish their tag team championships due to Trexxus's national service commitments.

==== Championship reigns (2015–2020) ====
Tang was the inaugural SPW Southeast Asian Champion, after beating Arsenal Affi in a match in October. Tang would lose his AWGC title to Jason Lee in December. Tang would hold the title until March 2016, where he would lose to Masa Takanashi. In May 2016, Tang would defeat CIMA and Takanashi to win back his title, becoming the first two-time SEA champion. Eventually, Tang would become the head coach of SPW, while Koryagin would focus more towards the business side. Onslaught would be joined by Destroyer Dharma, who become an ally of Tang.

In 2017, tensions would rise with his tag team partner, Trexxus. The two faced each other in January, and Tang lost his SEA title to Trexxus at SPW Unchained In Changi. Following this, Tang would begin teaming with only Dharma to represent Onslaught. In October 2017, Tang lost to then NXT UK Champion Pete Dunne in the main event. After the match, Dunne stated that he would return for a rematch Tang defeated Rene Dupree at SPW Relentless. Dunne returned to SPW in 2018 to face Tang, however appearing with Wolfgang and Mark Davis. The trio would be defeated by Andruew Tang, Kaiser Trexxus and Aiden Rex in a 3 on 3 match.

In 2019, Tang was invited as one of three Singaporean wrestlers, alongside Kaiser Trexxus and Alexis Lee, to take part in a WWE tryout. Only Trexxus was selected after the tryouts. In May, Tang would win the SEA title for the third time, defeating Lokomotiv, Jake De Leon and Trexxus, at SPW Atonement. Tang would lose to T-Hawk in July. Later that year he would take part in a 6-man tag team match alongside Trexxus, and Da Butcherman where they would face Cima, Shaolin Monk and world-renowned wrestler, Kenny Omega at SPW Klash of Kings.

In November, Tang lost to Tajiri in a singles match. Tang held the belt until eventually losing to Shaukat in January 2020, in a winner-take-all match where Shaukat's MYPW World-To-Regional Title was also on the line.

==== Longest reigning SEA champion (2020-present) ====
After Shaukat was forced to relinquish his title due to a concussion, Tang would win the title for a fourth time in February 2020, defeating JY Eagle, holding it ever since. At SPW Prove: Alive & Kicking #1, Dharma would turn on Onslaught, teaming with Aiden Rex to defeat Tang and Trexxus.

In May 2021, Tang defeated Kaiser Trexxus, retiring him from SPW, and Trexxus would later debut on WWE NXT under the ring name Dante Chen. Later that month, Tang would become the longest reigning SEA champion of all time, beating Lokomotiv's record of 462 days. In May 2022, Tang would later lose the belt to Aiden Rex, at SPW: Homecoming, after a record-breaking 862 day reign. In July, Tang unsuccessfully attempted to win the G-Rex Championship, losing to El Lindaman at SPW Battlefront. In November 2022, Tang competed at SPW X, the promotion's 10th anniversary, where he teamed with Mei Suruga, losing to Riho and Tajiri. On Day 2 of the event, Tang unsuccessfully attempted to reclaim his SEA title in a four-way match against Rex, Tajiri and Takanashi. In January 2023, Tang defeated Shivam in Thailand to win the AWGC Junior Heavyweight Championship for the second time in his career. In September 2023, Tang became the first Singaporeans along with Aiden Rex, to be included in the PWI 500. In November 2023, Tang faced former WWE wrestler Samuray Del Sol in the main event of SPW Viva La Lucha. In May 2024, with aid from the Midnight Bastards, Tang defeated Aiden Rex to win the SPW SEA Championship for the fifth time in his career. Tang lost the title to Da Butcherman in November.

=== New Japan Pro Wrestling (2015) ===
Tang made his New Japan Pro Wrestling debut on 20 June 2015, where he defeated Michael Nakazawa, retaining his AWGC Junior Heavyweight Championship at Day 1 of NJPW Wrestling World in Singapore. He is the first and only Singaporean to wrestle for NJPW.

=== Gatoh Move Pro Wrestling (2017–2019, 2022–present) ===
Tang made his Gatoh Move Pro Wrestling debut on 13 February 2017 losing to EK Baki. Later that year, Tang would lose a 3-man tag match to Dick Togo, Juken and Masahiro Takanashi. Tang returned to Gatoh Move in May 2018, losing two tag matches, teaming with Nyc and Chon Shiryu. In March 2019, Tang would lose two more tag matches, teaming with Emi Sakura, Takanashi and Baki. Due to COVID-19, Tang would be absent from Gatoh Move until November 2022 when he made his ChocoPro debut on #287, teaming with Da Butcherman and Dr. Gore, however, losing to Shivam, Takanashi and Chris Brookes. Tang returned on ChocoPro #304, teaming with Miya Yotsuba, losing to the duo of Takanashi and Mochi Natsumi. On ChocoPro #307, Tang teamed with Shivam to defeat Takanashi and Baliyan Akki. The team of Tang and Mei Suruga lost to Emi Sakura and Hagane Shinnou on #308, and on #309 Tang would compete in Emi Sakura's farewell royal rumble, losing.

=== Japanese promotions (2019, 2023–present) ===
Tang teamed with Kyu Mogami, losing a tag match in his Kaientai Dojo debut. In early 2023, Tang wrestled two matches for Dragon Gate in their collaborative event with Ring of Rebirth, defeating Big Boss Shimizu and DJ Kal in separate singles matches. In March 2023, Tang left Singapore to train under Tajiri and wrestle in Japan. He wrestled multiple matches for Kyushu Pro Wrestling, defeating Aiden Rex and Batten Blabla in a three-way match and teaming with Tajiri and Genkai to win a 3-man tag match. On 8 April, Tang made his Michinoku Pro Wrestling debut, losing a 3-man tag match. Later that month, Tang made his GLEAT debut, teaming with Quiet Storm but ultimately losing to Action Jackson and Hartley Jackson. Tang returned to Kyushu in May, competing in various singles and tag matches.

== Acting career ==
Tang has acted in various web series' including The Straits Times's Backend Show and Viddsee's Scene City. Tang made his cinema debut in Jack Neo's 2022 film, Ah Girls Go Army Again, as a martial arts instructor named Sergeant Hulk Tan.

== Personal life ==
To make ends meet as he began to train as a pro wrestler, Tang had a full-time marketing position at Bishan GYMMBOXX. Aside from wrestling, Tang also works as a trainer for F45 Training.

Tang's dream wrestling match is against Rey Mysterio, but he also wishes to partake in a singles match against Kenny Omega.

=== Legal issues ===
In 2019, Tang was charged with four counts of cheating and sentenced to two weeks of jail in September 2021, after being found guilty of leading banks, OCBC and Maybank, to believe that he was the ultimate beneficial owners of three various firms in order to open accounts for these firms, when in reality he was a resident nominee director, abetting his SPW co-founder, the true beneficial owner, Vadim Koryagin, who himself would be sentenced to four weeks in jail. In April 2022, Tang and the others involved in the case appealed against their conviction and sentences, however, it was denied. Two Singaporean women, Phee Sim Gek and Seet Mei Siah were also involved in the scheme and thereby jailed for five days in 2020.

== Filmography ==
Film
Year	Title	Role	Notes
2022	Ah Girls Go Army	Sergeant Hulk Tan	

Web
Year	Title	Role	Notes
2019	The Backend Show	Himself	Episode: Is Pro Wrestling Fake?
2021	Scene City	Himself	Episode: Dainta

== Championships and accomplishments ==
- Hong Kong Pro Wrestling Federation
  - AWGC Junior Heavyweight Championship (2 times)
- Pro Wrestling Illustrated
  - Ranked No. 491 of the top 500 singles wrestlers in the PWI 500 in 2023
- Singapore Pro Wrestling
  - SPW Southeast Asian Championship (5 times)
  - SPW Southeast Asian Tag Team Championships (1 time) – with Kaiser Trexxus
