= Nor 'Phoenix' Diana =

Malaysian professional wrestler

Personal information
- Born: Syaradeeba Khamarulzaman; 13 December 1999 (age 26) Kuala Lumpur, Malaysia

Professional wrestling career
- Ring name(s): Nor 'Phoenix' Diana; Nor Diana; Phoenix
- Billed from: Kuala Lumpur, Malaysia
- Trained by: Shaukat
- Debut: 13 February 2016

Syaradeeba Khamarulzaman (born 13 December 1999) is a Malaysian professional wrestler better known by her ring name Nor 'Phoenix' Diana and is the world's first hijab-wearing professional wrestler.

== Professional wrestling career ==
Diana first started training with Shaukat in 2015 at Malaysia Pro Wrestling (MYPW). In 2016, MYPW would have its first public showcase where Diana competed in the company's first ever women's match, losing to Scarlet Lyd. On 8 December 2018, Diana competed in a 'Pride vs Mask' match which she lost and had to unmask herself revealing her hijab. She stated to Forbes that “when I took off my mask I had mixed feelings ... I felt sad because the mask was part of Phoenix, but I also felt a bit of relief because now I can show my face, and the fans can see the real Phoenix.” On 6 July 2019, Diana competed in a five-way match for the MYPW Wrestlecon Championship, where she defeated four men (including her trainer Shaukat) to become the first female champion. Her victory attracted worldwide attention after a retweet by Mustafa Ali of a news article about her victory. On 24 November at Philippine Wrestling Revolution, Diana lost the championship to Crystal.

On 11 January 2020, Diana made her Pro-Wrestling: EVE debut defeating Zoe Lucas. On 11 December 2022, Diana beat Steph De Lander to become the inaugural APAC Women's Champion. On 14 October 2023, Diana lost the championship against Crystal and then won it again in a 'no disaqualification' match on the same day. On 5 May 2025, Diana competed in Tokyo Joshi Pro-Wrestling (TJPW) and faced Raku for the SETUP All Asia Women's Championship which she lost. On 30 August, Diana defeated Zayda Steel to become the number one contender to the WWE Women's ID Championship. On 15 November at House Of Glory Superclash, Diana lost her APAC Women's Championship to Mercedes Moné after holding the title for 763 days. A month later, it was reported that Diana is set for a tryout with WWE at the WWE Performance Center.

== Filmography ==
| Year | Title | Role | Notes |
|---|---|---|---|
| 2022 | Gila Gusti | Herself | |

== Championships and accomplishments ==
- APAC Wrestling
  - APAC Women's Championship (2 times)
- Malaysia Pro Wrestling
  - MYPW Wrestlecon Championship (1 time)

== Awards & nominations ==
| Year | Award | Category | Nominated work | Result | Ref |
|---|---|---|---|---|---|
| 2020 | Forbes | Forbes 30 Under 30 | | Placed | |
| 2025 | Elle Style Awards (Malaysia) | Best Athlete | 0 | Won | |
