= Da Butcherman =

Singaporean professional wrestler

- Born: Danial Alias; 13 January 1995 (age 31); Singapore
- Occupation: Professional wrestler
- Professional wrestling career
- Ring name: Da Butcherman The Butcher Bellum Roy
- Billed height: 5 ft 6 in (169 cm)
- Billed weight: 243 lb (110 kg)
- Billed from: Singapore

Danial Alias (born 13 January 1995) is a Singaporean professional wrestler where he performs under the ring name Da Butcherman at Singapore Pro Wrestling (SPW). He is the former one-times SPW Southeast Asia Champion as well as currently SPW Tag Team Champion. He is also the longest reigning SPW Singapore Champion of all time.

== Professional wrestling career ==
=== Singapore Pro Wrestling (2014–present) ===
Alias began training at Singapore Pro Wrestling in 2014. Alias, under the ring name, The Butcher Bellum Roy, debuted in SPW on 28 October 2016, with a malevolent persona, depicting himself as a cannibal. Da Butcherman would team up with Zero and Dr. Gore, to create a tag-team known as The Horrors. Zero would eventually part from The Horrors. The duo of Dr. Gore and the newly renamed, Da Butcherman would win the SPW Tag Team Championships in May 2019, defeating GM Carl Hella and Power Warrior in just 1 minutes and 48 seconds, the fastest victory in Singapore history. The Horrors would hold this record for over 3 years until it was beaten in 2022 by Varun Khanna. During that year, he took part in a 6-man tag team match alongside Trexxus, and "The Statement" Andruew Tang, where they would face and ultimately lose to Cima, Shaolin Monk and world-renowned wrestler, Kenny Omega.

In July 2019, Butcherman would attack the SPW Singapore Champion, Destroyer Dharma, and begin his quest to win the title. In November 2019, Da Butcherman participated in a three way match against Black Arrow, and Dharma, where he would finally win the Singapore Championship. His feud continued into the new decade, as he defeated Destroyer Dharma, for the second time, in a no-disqualification match. After Dr. Gore suffered a major injury, Butcherman would find a new ally, in CK Vin. He has held the championship ever since, and in June 2021, he would beat Aiden Rex's record of 574 days as champion, to become the longest reigning SPW Singapore Champion of all time, holding it for over 800 days. At SPW: Homecoming, in May 2022, Butcherman would defeat Dharma again, with the help of CK Vin. However, CK would betray him after the match, attacking him with a chair. He would clash with CK at SPW: Battlefront in July, and win, in a brutal last man standing match. After 1098 days, Butcherman would lose his Singapore Championship to Black Arrow in a three-way match with Big T at SPW X: Astronomical Anniversary Day 2.

In January 2024, Da Butcherman and Dr. Gore would win the SPW SEA Tag Team Champions for the second time, defeating Calamari Drunken Kings. In November 2024, Butcherman defeated The Statement to win the SPW Southeast Championship for the first time, becoming the first person to win the primary, secondary and tag team championships in SPW.

== Filmography ==
Web
| Year | Title | Role | Notes |
|---|---|---|---|
| 2019 | The Backend Show | Himself | Episode: Is Pro Wrestling Fake? |
| 2021 | Scene City | Himself | Episode: Dainta |

== Championships and accomplishments ==
- Singapore Pro Wrestling
  - SPW Southeast Asian Championship (1 time)
  - SPW Singapore Championship (1 time)
  - SPW Southeast Asian Tag Team Championship (2 times) – with Dr. Gore
- Vietnam Pro Wrestling
  - VPW Openweight Championship (1 time, current)
  - VPW The Rumble (2026)
