= Shaukat (wrestler) =

Malaysian professional wrestler

Personal information
- Born: Ayez Shaukat-Fonseka Farid; July 19, 1988 (age 37)

Professional wrestling career
- Ring name: Shaukat
- Billed height: 5 ft 7 in (170 cm)
- Billed weight: 180 lb (82 kg)

Ayez Shaukat-Fonseka Farid (born July 19, 1988) is a Malaysian professional wrestler and actor who performs under his shortened name, Shaukat. He is best known for being Malaysia's most successful professional wrestler.

== Professional wrestling career ==
In 2013, Shaukat, a then stunt-actor won a contest to have a lunch with WWE Hall of Famer, Booker T. He inspired Shaukat to start professional wrestling in Malaysia. Shaukat would then found a wrestling promotion and school unofficially named Persekutuan Gusti Malaysia (PGM) in 2014, which later was re-branded to Malaysia Pro Wrestling (MYPW) in 2016. In 2016, MYPW would have its first public showcase. In 2020, Shaukat would part ways with MYPW to start a new promotion called APAC Wrestling. In 2022, Shaukat would appear on Reality of Wrestling. He would wrestle two matches for Reality of Wrestling, defeating Johnathan Vegas and Tommy Bolton. As of late 2022, Shaukat continues to wrestle, training 30 students.

== Championships and accomplishments ==
- Hong Kong Pro Wrestling Federation
  - AWGC Junior Heavyweight Title (1 time)
- Malaysia Pro Wrestling
  - MYPW World-To-Regional Championship
- Singapore Pro Wrestling
  - SPW Southeast Asian Championship (1 time)
- Southern Territory Wrestling
  - STW Ambition Global Championship (1 time)
