= List of Philippine Wrestling Revolution event results =

This is a list of results in events produced by Philippine Wrestling Revolution (PWR), an independent professional wrestling promotion in the Philippines.

PWR was founded in 2013 by a group of Filipinos who want to start their own wrestling company. Its first official show, Renaissance, took place in September 2014. Many of PWR's events have been staged in Makati venues, but it has since been held in Manila, Mandaluyong, Parañaque, Pasig, and Quezon City.

It has also booked house shows in Quezon province, in Batanes, and the Asia Pop Comic Convention in 2016 and 2017.

== Renaissance (2014) ==
Renaissance (2014)
- Promotion: Philippine Wrestling Revolution
- Date: September 27, 2014
- City: Makati, Philippines
- Venue: Makati Square Arena

Event chronology
← Previous; First	Next → Terminus (2014)

Renaissance chronology
← Previous; First	Next → Renaissance (2015)

Renaissance was PWR's inaugural event, held at the Makati Square Arena in Makati on September 27, 2014.

No.	Results	Stipulations
1	Mayhem Brannigan defeated Robin Sane	Singles match
2	Ken Warren defeated Chris Panzer	Singles match
3	Mike Vargas defeated Main Maxx	Singles match
4	Kanto Terror defeated THE Nelson Borman Jr. and Epitaph	Three-way "Kanto Kaos Klassic" open challenge
5	Bombay Suarez defeated The Apocalypse	No Holds Barred match
6	"Classical" Bryan Leo (w/ Scarlett) defeated "The Senyorito" Jake de Leon	Singles match

== Terminus (2014) ==
Terminus (2014)
- Promotion: Philippine Wrestling Revolution
- Date: December 13, 2014
- City: Makati, Philippines
- Venue: Makati Square Arena

Event chronology
← Previous; Renaissance (2014)	Next → Vendetta (2015)

Terminus chronology
← Previous; First	Next → Terminus (2015)

This card was aired by TV5 in March 2015.

No.	Results	Stipulations
1	Chris Panzer defeated "The Social Media Sinister" Ken Warren	Singles match
2	Main Maxx defeated Kanto Terror and Mark D. Manalo	Handicap match
3	Bombay Suarez vs. "Classical" Bryan Leo (w/ Scarlett) ended in a no contest	Singles match
4	Mayhem Brannigan defeated The Apocalypse	Falls Count Anywhere match
5	"The Senyorito" Jake de Leon defeated John Sebastian	PWR Bootcamp open challenge
6	Bombay Suarez and "The Senyorito" Jake de Leon defeated "Classical" Bryan Leo (w/ Scarlett) and Main Maxx	Tag team match

== Vendetta (2015) ==
Vendetta (2015)
- Promotion: Philippine Wrestling Revolution
- Date: February 21, 2015
- City: Makati, Philippines
- Venue: Makati Square Arena

Event chronology
← Previous; Terminus (2014)	Next → Wrevolution X (2015)

Vendetta chronology
← Previous; First	Next → Vendetta (2016)

The first Vendetta event featured two matches that determined the competitors for the inaugural PWR Championship at Wrevolution X.

No.	Results	Stipulations
1	Bombay Suarez defeated "The Social Media Sinister" Ken Warren	Singles match, with the winner competing for the inaugural PWR Championship at Wrevolution X
2	Ralph Imabayashi defeated John Sebastian	Singles match
3	Mayhem Brannigan and The Apocalypse defeated "Classical" Bryan Leo and Main Maxx	Tag team "All Out War" match
4	Kanto Terror and Mark D. Manalo defeated Dual Shock (SANDATA and Peter Versoza)	Tag team match
5	Fighters 4 Hire (Joey Bax and Miguel Rosales) defeated Dual Shock (SANDATA and Peter Versoza)	Tag team match
6	"The Senyorito" Jake de Leon defeated Chris Panzer	Singles match, with the winner competing for the inaugural PWR Championship at Wrevolution X

== Wrevolution X (2015) ==
Wrevolution X (2015)
- Promotion: Philippine Wrestling Revolution
- Date: May 23, 2015
- City: Makati, Philippines
- Venue: Makati Square Arena

Event chronology
← Previous; Vendetta (2015)	Next → PWR Live

Vendetta chronology
← Previous; First	Next → Wrevolution X (2016)

Wrevolution X is PWR's annual flagship event happening every May. The inaugural PWR Champion was crowned during this event.

No.	Results	Stipulations
1	"Classical" Bryan Leo defeated Mayhem Brannigan	Iron Man match for a future shot at the PWR Championship Plus, Brannigan cannot face Leo in a rematch for one year. Had Leo lost, his stable The Royal Flush would have been forced to disband.
2	John Sebastian defeated Ralph Imabayashi	Singles match
3	The Apocalypse defeated Main Maxx	Last Man Standing match
4	Chris Panzer defeated "The Social Media Sinister" Ken Warren	Submission match
5	Beer Promdi (Kanto Terror and Mark D. Manalo) defeated Fighters 4 Hire (Joey Bax and Miguel Rosales) and Dual Shock (SANDATA and Peter Versoza)	Three-way elimination tag team match
6	"The Senyorito" Jake de Leon defeated Bombay Suarez	Singles match for the PWR Championship
7	"Classical" Bryan Leo defeated "The Senyorito" Jake de Leon (c)	Singles match for the PWR Championship Leo cashed in the title opportunity he won earlier in the night.
(c) / – the champion(s) heading into the match

== PWR Live ==
PWR Live
- Promotion: Philippine Wrestling Revolution
- Date: August 15, 2015
- City: Makati, Philippines
- Venue: Makati Square Arena

Event chronology
← Previous; Wrevolution X (2015)	Next → Renaissance (2015)

PWR Live chronology
← Previous; First	Next → PWR Live 2

PWR Live events take place between major PWR events. This first edition featured the start of a tournament for the inaugural Philippine Hybrid X (PHX) Championship, which will be crowned at next month's Renaissance.

Videos of the matches from this event were posted by Rappler the following day.

During the pre-show, Kanto Terror hosted a drinking contest, with 2 people from the audience as his challengers; he lost.

No.	Results	Stipulations
1^{P}	Vintendo defeated Jimmy Orellana	Singles match
2	John Sebastian defeated Bombay Suarez	Singles match
3	Mayhem Brannigan defeated Miguel Rosales via referee stoppage	PHX Championship tournament qualifying match
4	Chris Panzer defeated SANDATA	PHX Championship tournament qualifying match
5	The Apocalypse defeated Mark D. Manalo via referee stoppage	Singles match
6	Ralph Imabayashi defeated Peter Versoza	PHX Championship tournament qualifying match
7	Ken Warren defeated Joey Bax	PHX Championship tournament qualifying match
8	"Classical" Bryan Leo (c) defeated "The Senyorito" Jake de Leon via KO	Singles match for the PWR Championship
(c) / – the champion(s) heading into the match; P / – the match was broadcast on the pre-show

== Renaissance (2015) ==
Renaissance (2015)
- Promotion: Philippine Wrestling Revolution
- Date: September 26, 2015
- City: Makati, Philippines
- Venue: Makati Square Arena

Event chronology
← Previous; PWR Live	Next → PWR Live 2

Renaissance chronology
← Previous; Renaissance (2014)	Next → Renaissance (2016)

The PHX Championship tournament culminated during this event. This would be the last PWR show held at the Makati Square Arena.

Before the main event, comedian Stanley Chi hosted a Suplado Show in-ring segment, with Kanto Terror, then Mark D. Manalo and PWR General Manager Mr. Sy.

No.	Results	Stipulations
1^{P}	"The Machine" Mavericc Knight defeated Vintendo	Singles match
2^{P}	Mark D. Manalo defeated Jimmy Orellana	Singles match
3	Fighters 4 Hire (Joey Bax and Miguel Rosales) defeated Dual Shock (Peter Versoza and SANDATA)	2-out-of-3 falls tag team match
4	Mayhem Brannigan defeated Chris Panzer	PHX Championship tournament semi-final match Both men were attacked by Fighters 4 Hire afterwards. Brannigan wasn't able to advance to the final.
5	John Sebastian defeated Bombay Suarez	No Holds Barred match
6	"The Social Media Sinister" Ken Warren defeated Ralph Imabayashi	Tournament final for the PHX Championship
7	"Classical" Bryan Leo (c) defeated "The Senyorito" Jake de Leon and The Apocalypse	Three-way match for the PWR Championship
(c) / – the champion(s) heading into the match; P / – the match was broadcast on the pre-show

== PWR Live 2 ==
PWR Live 2
- Promotion: Philippine Wrestling Revolution
- Date: November 28, 2015
- City: Makati, Philippines
- Venue: iAcademy Auditorium

Event chronology
← Previous; Renaissance (2015)	Next → Terminus (2015)

PWR Live chronology
← Previous; PWR Live	Next → PWR Live: Road to Vendetta

This is the first PWR show at the iAcademy Auditorium.

The show started with Rederick Mahaba hosting a Mahabang Usapan in-ring segment, with The Royal Flush as guests.

No.	Results	Stipulations
1^{P}	"The Machine" Mavericc Knight defeated Lynch	Singles match
2^{P}	Fighters 4 Hire (Joey Bax and Miguel Rosales) defeated Los Trabajadores (Trabajador Uno and Trabajador Dos)	Tag team match
3	Main Maxx (w/ The Royal Flush) defeated Rederick Mahaba	Singles match Had Mahaba won, he would have scored a date with Scarlett.
4	The Apocalypse defeated Vintendo	Singles match
5	James "Idol" Martinez defeated "The Senyorito" Jake de Leon	Singles match
6	Ralph Imabayashi defeated John Sebastian	Singles match to determine #1 contender to the PWR Championship
7	"The Social Media Minister" Ken Warren (c) defeated Chris Panzer	Singles match for the PHX Championship
8	Peter Versoza defeated SANDATA	Singles match
9	"Classical" Bryan Leo (c) defeated Mark D. Manalo	Singles match for the PWR Championship
(c) / – the champion(s) heading into the match; P / – the match was broadcast on the pre-show

== Terminus (2015) ==
Terminus (2015)
- Promotion: Philippine Wrestling Revolution
- Date: December 19, 2015
- City: Makati, Philippines
- Venue: iAcademy Auditorium

Event chronology
← Previous; PWR Live 2	Next → PWR Live: Road to Vendetta

Terminus chronology
← Previous; Terminus (2014)	Next → Last

The Path of Gold trophy was first awarded at this event. Its holder earns the right to challenge either the PWR champion or the PHX champion at any time within the next 12 months. It would later become a regular fixture in Terminus events.

During the pre-show, comedian Stanley Chi hosted a Suplado Show in-ring segment, with Mr. Sy and The Network as guests.

No.	Results	Stipulations
1^{P}	"The Machine" Mavericc Knight defeated Los Trabajadores (Trabajador Uno and Trabajador Dos)	Handicap match
2	Jake de Leon and Bombay Suarez defeated The Royal Flush (Main Maxx and John Sebastian)	Tag team match
3	SANDATA vs. Peter Versoza ended in a no contest	Singles match
4	The Apocalypse defeated Mark D. Manalo	"All Out War" hair versus mask match
5	"The Senyorito" Jake de Leon won by last eliminating Peter Versoza	8-man Path of Gold elimination match
6	Chris Panzer defeated Miguel Rosales	Singles match to determine the #1 contender to the MyPW South East Asian Championship in Malaysia
7	Ralph Imabayashi defeated "Classical" Bryan Leo (c)	Singles match for the PWR Championship
(c) / – the champion(s) heading into the match; P / – the match was broadcast on the pre-show

Path of Gold match - Order of entry and elimination

Entry #	Wrestler	Exit #	Eliminated by
1	John Sebastian	5	Suarez
2	Main Maxx	4	eliminated due to injury
3	Jake de Leon	-	WINNER
4	Rederick Mahaba	2	Martinez
5	Peter Versoza	7	De Leon
6	Bombay Suarez	6	Versoza
7	SANDATA	1	Maxx, Sebastian
8	James "Idol" Martinez	3	De Leon

== PWR Live: Road to Vendetta ==
PWR Live: Road to Vendetta
- Promotion: Philippine Wrestling Revolution
- Date: January 30, 2016
- City: Makati, Philippines
- Venue: iAcademy Auditorium

Event chronology
← Previous; Terminus (2015)	Next → Vendetta (2016)

PWR Live chronology
← Previous; PWR Live 2	Next → PWR Live: Manila Madness

No.	Results	Stipulations
1^{P}	The Network (James "Idol" Martinez and Chino Guinto) defeated Los Trabajadores (Trabajador Uno and Trabajador Dos)	Tag team match
2	"Classical" Bryan Leo defeated Rederick Mahaba	Singles match
3	PHX Champion Ken Warren defeated Vintendo	Singles match
4	Chris Panzer defeated Joey Bax	Singles match
5	The Royal Flush (Main Maxx and John Sebastian) defeated "The Senyorito" Jake de Leon and Mark D. Manalo	Tag team match
6	Bombay Suarez defeated Peter Versoza	Singles match
7	Ralph Imabayashi (c) defeated The Apocalypse	Singles match for the PWR Championship
(c) / – the champion(s) heading into the match; P / – the match was broadcast on the pre-show

== Vendetta (2016) ==
Vendetta (2016)
- Promotion: Philippine Wrestling Revolution
- Date: February 20, 2016
- City: Makati, Philippines
- Venue: iAcademy Auditorium

Event chronology
← Previous; PWR Live: Road to Vendetta	Next → PWR Live: Manila Madness

Vendetta chronology
← Previous; Vendetta (2015)	Next → Vendetta (2017)

The event featured the first-ever intergender match in PWR history, with Peter Versoza taking on Crystal.

No.	Results	Stipulations
1^{P}	Yohann Ollores defeated Trabajador Dos	Singles match
2^{P}	Vintendo defeated Chino Guinto	Singles match
3	"The Senyorito" Jake de Leon defeated Main Maxx	Singles match, with De Leon's Path of Gold trophy on the line
4	PHX Champion Ken Warren defeated MyPW Extreme Division Champion Bombay Suarez	"Champion versus Champion" match
5	John Sebastian defeated Mark D. Manalo	Singles match
6	James "Idol" Martinez defeated Rederick Mahaba	Singles match
7	Peter Versoza defeated Crystal	Intergender singles match
8	SANDATA defeated Joey Bax via submission	Singles match
9	"Classical" Bryan Leo defeated Ralph Imabayashi (c)	Singles match for the PWR Championship
(c) / – the champion(s) heading into the match; P / – the match was broadcast on the pre-show

== PWR Live: Manila Madness ==
PWR Live: Manila Madness
- Promotion: Philippine Wrestling Revolution
- Date: March 5, 2016
- City: Manila, Philippines
- Venue: Tanduay Covered Court

Event chronology
← Previous; Vendetta (2016)	Next → PWR Live: The Road to Wrevolution X

PWR Live chronology
← Previous; PWR Live: Road to Vendetta	Next → PWR Live: The Road to Wrevolution X

This was PWR's first event in the city of Manila.

No.	Results	Stipulations
1	Rederick Mahaba defeated Chino Guinto	Singles match
2	Beer Promdi (Kanto Terror and Mark D. Manalo) defeated Los Trabajadores (Trabajador Uno and Trabajador Dos)	Tag team match
3	SANDATA defeated The Apocalypse via count-out	Singles match
4	The Royal Flush ("Classical" Bryan Leo and Main Maxx) defeated Jake de Leon and Ralph Imabayashi	Tag team match
5	Bombay Suarez defeated Ken Warren (c) and Chris Panzer	Three-way match for the PHX Championship
(c) / – the champion(s) heading into the match

== PWR Live: The Road to Wrevolution X ==
PWR Live: The Road to Wrevolution X
- Promotion: Philippine Wrestling Revolution
- Date: April 23, 2016
- City: Parañaque, Philippines
- Venue: Barangay BF Homes Multi-Purpose Gym

Event chronology
← Previous; PWR Live: Manila Madness	Next → Wrevolution X (2016)

PWR Live chronology
← Previous; PWR Live: Manila Madness	Next → PWR Live: The ShawDown

This was PWR's first event in Parañaque.

No.	Results	Stipulations
1	Rederick Mahaba defeated Yohann Ollores	Singles match
2	Chino Guinto defeated SANDATA	Singles match
3	Joex Bax defeated Mark D. Manalo	Singles match
4	The Network (James "Idol" Martinez and Bruno Bernardo) defeated Los Trabajadores (Trabajador Uno and Trabajador Dos)	Tag team match
5	Main Maxx defeated Bombay Suarez (c) and Ken Warren	Three-way match for the PHX Championship
6	The Apocalypse defeated Vintendo via submission	Singles match
7	The Royal Flush (PWR Champion "Classical" Bryan Leo, John Sebastian and Main Maxx) defeated Jake de Leon, Ralph Imabayashi and Chris Panzer	Six-man tag team match
(c) / – the champion(s) heading into the match

== Wrevolution X (2016) ==
Wrevolution X (2016)
- Promotion: Philippine Wrestling Revolution
- Date: May 28, 2016
- City: Makati, Philippines
- Venue: iAcademy Auditorium

Event chronology
← Previous; PWR Live: The Road to Wrevolution X	Next → PWR Live: The ShawDown

Wrevolution X chronology
← Previous; Wrevolution X (2015)	Next → Wrevolution X (2017)

"The Senyorito" Jake de Leon cashed in his Path of Gold Trophy for a shot at the PWR Championship at this event.

No.	Results	Stipulations
1^{P}	Delirium (Dan Ericson and Dax Xaviera) defeated Mike Madrigal and Keivan Skull	Tag team match
2^{P}	The Network (Mavericc Knight and Bruno Bernardo) defeated Ramon Bautista (w/ Stanley Chi) and random audience member	Tag team match
3^{P}	The Network (Mavericc Knight and Bruno Bernardo) defeated Los Trabajadores (Trabajador Uno and Trabajador Dos)	Tag team match
4	Rederick Mahaba defeated James "Idol" Martinez via submission	"No Countout" match Had Mahaba lost, he would have been forced to join The Network. The match was restarted by Mr. Sy when the original singles bout ended via countout.
5	Miguel Rosales (w/ Joey Bax) defeated Ken Warren	Singles match
6	Chino Guinto won by last eliminating Crystal	8-person gauntlet match to determine the #1 contender to the PHX Championship
7	Main Maxx (c) defeated Chino Guinto	Singles match for the PHX Championship
8	The Apocalypse defeated Kanto Terror (w/ Mark D. Manalo)	All Out War match
9	Peter Versoza defeated Bombay Suarez	First Blood match
10	John Sebastian (w/ KC Montero) defeated Chris Panzer (w/ Mr. Sy)	Singles match As a result, Mr. Sy was fired as PWR General Manager. Had Sebastian lost, Montero would have been forced to give up his hosting duties at the G.O.A.T. television show.
11	"The Senyorito" Jake de Leon defeated "Classical" Bryan Leo (c) and Ralph Imabayashi	Three-way match for the PWR Championship
(c) / – the champion(s) heading into the match; P / – the match was broadcast on the pre-show

PHX Gauntlet Match - Order of entry and elimination

1. Yohann Ollores defeated Vintendo
2. Mark D. Manalo defeated Yohann Ollores
3. Joey Bax defeated Mark D. Manalo
4. SANDATA defeated Joey Bax via submission
5. SANDATA defeated Trabajador Uno
6. Chino Guinto defeated SANDATA
7. Chino Guinto defeated Crystal

== PWR Live: The ShawDown ==
PWR Live: The ShawDown
- Promotion: Philippine Wrestling Revolution
- Date: July 30, 2016
- City: Mandaluyong, Philippines
- Venue: 500 Shaw Events Pavilion

Event chronology
← Previous; Wrevolution X (2016)	Next → Renaissance (2016)

PWR Live chronology
← Previous; PWR Live: The Road to Wrevolution X	Next → PWR Live: Suplex Sunday

This was PWR's first event in Mandaluyong.

During the show, Rederick Mahaba hosted a Mahabang Usapan in-ring segment, with PWR Champion Jake de Leon, Ralph Imabayashi, John Sebastian, PHX Champion Main Maxx, and Peter Versoza as guests.

Crystal and Scarlett were scheduled to have a contract signing for a match at Renaissance, but Scarlett announced her retirement from wrestling days before PWR Live.

No.	Results	Stipulations
1^{P}	The Network (James "Idol" Martinez, Chino Guinto and Bruno Bernardo) defeated Vintendo and Delirium (Dax Xaviera and Dan Ericson)	Six-man tag team match
2	Yohann Ollores (w/ Logan Ollores) defeated Mark D. Manalo (w/ Kanto Terror)	Singles match
3	Rederick Mahaba defeated Ken Warren via count-out	Singles match
4	Joey Bax defeated Mike Madrigal	Singles match
5	Vlad Sinnsyk defeated Ralph Imabayashi	Singles match
6	SANDATA vs. "Classical" Bryan Leo ended in a no contest	Singles match Leo did not show up at the event. Chino Guinto confronted SANDATA instead.
7	Martivo defeated Trabajador Tres	Singles match
8	John Sebastian defeated The Apocalypse and Chris Panzer	Three-way match to determine the #1 contender to the PWR Championship Apocalypse was added to the match by the PWR Board of Directors.
9	PWR Champion Jake de Leon defeated PHX Champion Main Maxx via DQ	"Champion versus Champion" singles match
P / – the match was broadcast on the pre-show

== Renaissance (2016) ==
Renaissance (2016)
- Promotion: Philippine Wrestling Revolution
- Date: October 8, 2016
- City: Pasig
- Venue: Bayanihan Center

Event chronology
← Previous; PWR Live: The ShawDown	Next → PWR Live: Suplex Sunday

Renaissance chronology
← Previous; Renaissance (2015)	Next → Renaissance (2017)

This was PWR's first event in Pasig.

No.	Results	Stipulations
1^{P}	Vlad Sinnsyk defeated Trabajador Tres	Singles match
2^{P}	Vlad Sinnsyk defeated Vintendo	Singles match
3^{P}	Mike Madrigal defeated Robynn	Intergender singles match
4	James "Idol" Martinez defeated Ralph Imabayashi via countout	Singles match
5	Peter Versoza defeated Rederick Mahaba	Singles match
6	Fighters 4 Hire (Joey Bax and Miguel Rosales) defeated Delirium (Dax Xaviera and Dan Ericson)	Tag team match
7	The Apocalypse defeated Chris Panzer	"All Out War" match
8	The YOLO Twins (Yohann and Logan Ollores) defeated Beer Promdi (Kanto Terror and Mark D. Manalo)	Tag team match
9	SANDATA defeated Chino Guinto	Singles match to determine the #1 contender to the PHX Championship
10	Main Maxx (c) defeated Crystal	Intergender singles match for the PHX Championship
11	"The Senyorito" Jake de Leon (c) defeated John Sebastian	Singles match for the PWR Championship
(c) / – the champion(s) heading into the match; P / – the match was broadcast on the pre-show

== PWR Live: Suplex Sunday ==
PWR Live: Suplex Sunday
- Promotion: Philippine Wrestling Revolution
- Date: November 13, 2016
- City: Pasig
- Venue: Bayanihan Center

Event chronology
← Previous; Renaissance (2016)	Next → PWR Live: Bagong Yugto

PWR Live chronology
← Previous; PWR Live: The ShawDown	Next → PWR Live: Bagong Yugto

During the event, The Network leader James "Idol" Martinez delivered a "State of the Network Address".

No.	Results	Stipulations
1^{P}	Kanto Terror defeated Trabajador Maximo	Singles match
2^{P}	The Apocalypse defeated Dax Xaviera (w/ Dan Ericson)	Singles match
3	Punk Dolls (Martivo and Robynn) defeated The YOLO Twins (Yohann and Logan Ollores)	Intergender tag team match
4	Ralph Imabayashi and Rederick Mahaba defeated James "Idol" Martinez and Alexander Belmonte III	Tag team match
5	Vintendo defeated Keivan Skull	Singles match
6	Main Maxx (c) defeated SANDATA	Singles match for the PHX Championship
7	Crystal defeated Peter Versoza	Intergender singles match
8	Fighters 4 Hire (Joey Bax and Miguel Rosales) vs. Mike Madrigal and Vlad Sinnsyk ended in a double count-out	Tag team match
9	Chris Panzer defeated Chino Guinto	Singles match
10	John Sebastian defeated "The Senyorito" Jake de Leon (c)	Bacolod Bullrope match for the PWR Championship
(c) / – the champion(s) heading into the match; P / – the match was broadcast on the pre-show

== PWR Live: Bagong Yugto ==
PWR Live: Bagong Yugto
- Promotion: Philippine Wrestling Revolution
- Date: January 29, 2017
- City: Quezon City, Philippines
- Venue: Venue 142 Events Place

Event chronology
← Previous; PWR Live: Suplex Sunday	Next → Path of Gold (2017)

PWR Live chronology
← Previous; PWR Live: Suplex Sunday	Next → PWR Live: Mainit

This was PWR's first show in Quezon City.

PWR was supposed to hold its annual Terminus show in December 2016, but had to cancel it because of "directional developments" within the company.

No.	Results	Stipulations
1^{P}	Bombay Suarez defeated Dax Xaviera	Singles match
2	Mike Madrigal and Vlad Sinnsyk defeated Punk Dolls (Martivo and Robynn)	Intergender tag team match
3	Alexander Belmonte III (w/ James Martinez and Chino Guinto) defeated Rederick Mahaba (w/ Ralph Imabayashi)	Singles match
4	Chris Panzer defeated Ken Warren	Singles match
5	Chino Guinto (w/ James Martinez and Alexander Belmonte III) defeated Ralph Imabayashi (w/ Rederick Mahaba)	Singles match
6	Peter Versoza defeated Main Maxx (c)	Singles match for the PHX Championship
7	Crystal defeated James "Idol" Martinez	Intergender singles match
8	The Apocalypse defeated SANDATA	Singles match
9	The YOLO Twins (Yohann and Logan Ollores) defeated Fighters 4 Hire (Joey Bax and Miguel Rosales)	Tag team match
10	John Sebastian (c) vs "The Senyorito" Jake de Leon ended in a no contest	Singles match for the PWR Championship
(c) / – the champion(s) heading into the match; P / – the match was broadcast on the pre-show

== Path of Gold (2017) ==
Path of Gold (2017)
- Promotion: Philippine Wrestling Revolution
- Date: February 26, 2017
- City: Pasig
- Venue: Bayanihan Center

Event chronology
← Previous; PWR Live: Bagong Yugto	Next → PWR Live: Mainit

Path of Gold chronology
← Previous; First	Next → Path of Gold (2018)

Making his first appearance for PWR, former NWA Canadian Junior Heavyweight Champion Billy Suede competed at the pre-show.

No.	Results	Stipulations
1^{P}	Evan Carleaux defeated McKata	Singles match
2^{P}	"Beautiful" Billy Suede defeated Blackzilla	Singles match
3	Dax Xaviera defeated Dan Ericson	Singles match
4	Peter Versoza (c) defeated Main Maxx	Singles match for the PHX Championship
5	John Sebastian (c) defeated "The Senyorito" Jake de Leon and The Apocalypse	Three-way All Out War match for the PWR Championship
6	Chris Panzer won by last eliminating Ralph Imabayashi	21-person Path of Gold match
(c) / – the champion(s) heading into the match; P / – the match was broadcast on the pre-show

Path of Gold match - Order of entry and elimination

Entry #	Wrestler	Exit #	Eliminated by
1	SANDATA	6	Madrigal, Sinnsyk
2	Chino Guinto	19	Panzer
3	Mike Madrigal	7	Rosales
4	Joey Bax	2	Madrigal
5	Logan Ollores	8	Mahaba
6	Kanto Terror	1	L. Ollores, Y. Ollores
7	Yohann Ollores	9	Imabayashi
8	Ralph Imabayashi	20	Panzer
9	Chris Panzer	-	WINNER
10	Vlad Sinnsyk	12	De Leon
11	Martivo	15	Guinto
12	Ken Warren	17	Panzer, Imabayashi
13	Dax Xaviera	5	Martinez, Guinto
14	Crystal	3	Robynn
15	Robynn	4	Martinez
16	James "Idol" Martinez	14	Guinto
17	Main Maxx	13	Warren
18	Jake de Leon	18	Guinto
19	Rederick Mahaba	10	Warren
20	Miguel Rosales	11	Sinnsyk
21	Bombay Suarez	16	Guinto

== PWR Live: Mainit ==
PWR Live: Mainit
- Promotion: Philippine Wrestling Revolution
- Date: March 19, 2017
- City: Pasig
- Venue: Bayanihan Center

Event chronology
← Previous; Path of Gold (2017)	Next → Wrevolution X (2017)

PWR Live chronology
← Previous; PWR Live: Bagong Yugto	Next → PWR Live: Resbak

A tournament to crown the inaugural PWR Tag Team Champions kicked off at this event. The winners in each of the 3 qualifying matches will face off at Wrevolution X.

No.	Results	Stipulations
1^{P}	Evan Carleaux defeated Bolt	Singles match
2^{P}	Crystal defeated Trian dela Torre	PWR Bootcamp Challenge match
3	Mike Madrigal and Vlad Sinnsyk defeated Delirium (Dan Ericson and Dax Xaviera)	PWR Tag Team Championship tournament qualifying match
4	"Beautiful" Billy Suede defeated McKata via submission	Singles match
5	Fighters 4 Hire (Joey Bax and Miguel Rosales) defeated The Network (James "Idol" Martinez and Alexander Belmonte III)	PWR Tag Team Championship tournament qualifying match
6	Peter Versoza (c) defeated The Apocalypse	Singles match for the PHX Championship
7	Chris Panzer defeated Jake de Leon	Singles match
8	SANDATA defeated Ralph Imabayashi via submission	Singles match to determine #1 contender to the PHX Championship
9	The YOLO Twins (Yohann and Logan Ollores) defeated Punk Dolls (Robynn and Martivo)	PWR Tag Team Championship tournament qualifying match
10	John Sebastian (c) vs. Main Maxx ended in a no contest	Singles match for the PWR Championship
(c) / – the champion(s) heading into the match; P / – the match was broadcast on the pre-show

== Wrevolution X (2017) ==
Wrevolution X (2017)
- Promotion: Philippine Wrestling Revolution
- Date: April 30, 2017
- City: Pasig
- Venue: Bayanihan Center

Event chronology
← Previous; PWR Live: Mainit	Next → PWR Live: Resbak

Wrevolution X chronology
← Previous; Wrevolution X (2016)	Next → Wrevolution X (2018)

The inaugural PWR Tag Team Champions were crowned at this event.

Chris Panzer also cashed in his Path of Gold Trophy for a shot at the PWR Championship.

No.	Results	Stipulations
1^{P}	Bolt defeated Nina	Intergender singles match
2^{P}	Alexander Belmonte III defeated McKata	Singles match
3^{P}	Delirium (Dax Xaviera and Dan Ericson) defeated Evan Carleaux and Trian dela Torre	Tag team match
4	The Apocalypse defeated Rederick Mahaba	All Out War match
5	Chino Guinto vs. Ralph Imabayashi ended in a no contest	Singles match to determine #1 contender to the PHX Championship
6	James "Idol" Martinez defeated Martivo	Singles match
7	Ken Warren defeated Bombay Suarez	Singles match
8	The YOLO Twins (Yohann and Logan Ollores) defeated Fighters 4 Hire (Joey Bax and Miguel Rosales) and Deadly Sinns (Mike Madrigal and Vlad Sinnsyk)	Three-way tournament final for the inaugural PWR Tag Team Championship
9	Chino Guinto defeated Peter Versoza (c), Ralph Imabayashi, and SANDATA	Four-way match for the PHX Championship
10	Jake de Leon defeated "Beautiful" Billy Suede	Singles match
11	Robynn defeated Crystal	Singles match
12	Chris Panzer defeated John Sebastian (c)	Singles match for the PWR Championship
(c) / – the champion(s) heading into the match; P / – the match was broadcast on the pre-show

== PWR Live: Resbak ==
PWR Live: Resbak
- Promotion: Philippine Wrestling Revolution
- Date: May 28, 2017
- City: Makati, Philippines
- Venue: Foton Showroom

Event chronology
← Previous; Wrevolution X (2017)	Next → Renaissance (2017)

PWR Live chronology
← Previous; PWR Live: Mainit	Next → PWR Live: Bakbakan sa Bayanihan

International wrestler Koto Hiro from Japan made his first appearance for PWR at this event.

No.	Results	Stipulations
1^{P}	Zayden Trudeau defeated Vintendo	Singles match
2^{P}	SANDATA defeated Kh3ndrick	Singles match
3	The YOLO Twins (Yohann and Logan Ollores) (c) defeated Punk Dolls (Martivo and Robynn)	Tag team match for the PWR Tag Team Championship
4	Koto Hiro defeated Ken Warren	Singles match
5	The Network (James "Idol" Martinez and Alexander Belmonte III) defeated Delirium (Dax Xaviera and Dan Ericson)	Tag team match
6	Chino Guinto (c) defeated Peter Versoza	Singles match for the PHX Championship
7	Fighters 4 Hire (Joey Bax and Miguel Rosales) defeated Deadly Sinns (Mike Madrigal and Vlad Sinnsyk)	Tag team All Out War match
8	Trian dela Torre defeated The Apocalypse	Singles match
9	Crystal defeated Bolt	Intergender singles match
10	Ralph Imabayashi (w/ Rederick Mahaba) defeated Jake de Leon	Singles match
11	Chris Panzer (c) defeated John Sebastian	2-out-of-3 falls match for the PWR Championship
(c) / – the champion(s) heading into the match; P / – the match was broadcast on the pre-show

== Renaissance (2017) ==
Renaissance (2017)
- Promotion: Philippine Wrestling Revolution
- Date: June 25, 2017
- City: Quezon City, Philippines
- Venue: Playland, Fisher Mall

Event chronology
← Previous; PWR Live: Resbak	Next → PWR Live: Bakbakan sa Bayanihan

Renaissance chronology
← Previous; Renaissance (2016)	Next → Renaissance (2018)

Rederick Mahaba hosted a Mahabang Usapan in-ring segment, with Ralph Imabayashi as guest. Mr. Sy, Evan Carleaux and Main Maxx served as the commentary team.

No.	Results	Stipulations
1^{P}	Dax Xaviera and Bolt defeated The KakaiBros (Kh3Ndrick and Mh4rckie)	Tag team match
2^{P}	McKata defeated Vintendo	Singles match
3	Rederick Mahaba (w/ Ralph Imabayashi) defeated Zayden Trudeau via submission	Singles match
4	The Deadly Sinns (Mike Madrigal and Vlad Sinnsyk) defeated Punk Dolls (Robynn and Martivo)	Tag team match
5	John Sebastian defeated Brad Cruz	Singles match
6	Ken Warren and PWR Tag Team Champions The YOLO Twins (Yohann and Logan Ollores) defeated The Network (James "Idol" Martinez, Alexander Belmonte III, and PHX Champion Chino Guinto)	Six-man tag team match
7	Miguel Rosales defeated Peter Versoza	Singles match
8	Trian dela Torre defeated The Apocalypse via DQ	Singles match
9	"Beautiful" Billy Suede defeated SANDATA	Singles match to determine #1 contender to the PWR Championship
10	Chris Panzer (c) defeated Ralph Imabayashi and Jake de Leon	Three-way match for the PWR Championship
(c) / – the champion(s) heading into the match; P / – the match was broadcast on the pre-show

== PWR Live: Bakbakan sa Bayanihan ==
PWR Live: Bakbakan sa Bayanihan
- Promotion: Philippine Wrestling Revolution
- Date: July 23, 2017
- City: Pasig
- Venue: Bayanihan Center

Event chronology
← Previous; Renaissance (2017)	Next → PWR Live: Sugod!

PWR Live chronology
← Previous; PWR Live: Resbak	Next → PWR Live: Sugod!

Chino Guinto relinquished the PHX Championship at this event due to a knee injury, which would take him out of in-ring action for 8 to 10 months.

Also, after The Apocalypse's victory in the All Out War Match, the PWR Board awarded him with the PWR All Out War Championship in recognition of his success in All Out War matches.

No.	Results	Stipulations
1^{P}	Brad Cruz defeated Trabajador Quatro	Singles match
2^{P}	Bolt defeated Vintendo via DQ	Singles match
3	The Apocalypse defeated Trian dela Torre	All Out War Match
4	Punk Dolls (Martivo and Robynn) defeated The KakaiBros (Kh3Ndrick and Mh4rckie)	Tag team match
5	Vlad Sinnsyk defeated SANDATA	Singles match
6	The YOLO Twins (Yohann and Logan Ollores) (c) defeated The Network (James "Idol" Martinez and Alexander Belmonte III)	Tag team match for the PWR Tag Team Championship
7	Dax Xaviera defeated Ken Warren	Singles match
8	Peter Versoza and John Sebastian vs. Fighters 4 Hire (Joey Bax and Miguel Rosales) ended in a no contest	Tag team match
9	Ralph Imabayashi defeated Jake de Leon	"Matira Matibay" match
10	"Beautiful" Billy Suede defeated Chris Panzer (c)	Singles match for the PWR Championship
(c) / – the champion(s) heading into the match; P / – the match was broadcast on the pre-show

== PWR Live: Sugod! ==
PWR Live: Sugod!
- Promotion: Philippine Wrestling Revolution
- Date: September 3, 2017
- City: Makati, Philippines
- Venue: Power Mac Center Spotlight

Event chronology
← Previous; PWR Live: Bakbakan sa Bayanihan	Next → PWR Live: Oktoberplex

PWR Live chronology
← Previous; PWR Live: Bakbakan sa Bayanihan	Next → PWR Live: Oktoberplex

This was PWR's first show at the Power Mac Center Spotlight in Makati.

In the opening segment, John Sebastian revealed that he became a co-owner of PWR after buying 50% of the company. He then challenged Mr. Sy to a 5-on-5 elimination match at Vendetta. If Mr. Sy's team loses, he would be fired as PWR General Manager.

No.	Results	Stipulations
1^{P}	The Revo-Ranger defeated Trabajador Quatro	Singles match
2^{P}	McKata defeated Vintendo	Singles match
3	Rederick Mahaba (w/ Ralph Imabayashi) defeated Dax Xaviera	Singles match
4	All Out War Champion The Apocalypse defeated Brad Cruz	Non-title singles match
5	Bolt defeated Zayden Trudeau	Singles match
6	Jake de Leon defeated Vlad Sinnsyk	Singles match
7	Peter Versoza defeated Joey Bax	Singles match
8	TDTxECX (Evan Carleaux and Trian dela Torre) defeated The YOLO Twins (Yohann and Logan Ollores), Punk Dolls (Robynn and Martivo), and The KakaiBros (Kh3ndrick and Mh4rckie)	Fatal four-way tag team match to determine #1 contenders to the PWR Tag Team Championship
9	Mike Madrigal (c) defeated SANDATA	Singles match for the PHX Championship
10	Chris Panzer defeated "Beautiful" Billy Suede (c) and Ralph Imabayashi (w/ Rederick Mahaba)	Triple threat match for the PWR Championship
(c) / – the champion(s) heading into the match; P / – the match was broadcast on the pre-show

== PWR Live: Oktoberplex ==
PWR Live: Oktoberplex
- Promotion: Philippine Wrestling Revolution
- Date: October 3, 2017
- City: Makati, Philippines
- Venue: Power Mac Center Spotlight

Event chronology
← Previous; PWR Live: Sugod!	Next → Vendetta (2017)

PWR Live chronology
← Previous; PWR Live: Sugod!	Next → PWR Live: Kingdom Come

The event featured a "rap battle" between Vintendo and McKata at the pre-show.

No.	Results	Stipulations
1^{P}	Kapitan PWR defeated Trabajador Quatro	Singles match
2	All Out War Champion The Apocalypse defeated The Revo-Ranger	Non-title singles match
3	SANDATA defeated Mh4rckie (w/ Kh3ndrick)	Singles match
4	Dax Xaviera defeated Peter Versoza	Singles match
5	Vlad Sinnsyk defeated Brad Cruz	Singles match
6	Zayden Trudeau defeated "Beautiful" Billy Suede	Singles match
7	The YOLO Twins (Yohann and Logan Ollores) defeated Punk Dolls (Robynn and Martivo)	Tag team match
8	Ralph Imabayashi and Rederick Mahaba defeated Fighters 4 Hire (Miguel Rosales and Joey Bax)	Tag team match
9	Bolt defeated PHX Champion Mike Madrigal	Non-title singles match
10	The Network (James "Idol" Martinez and Alexander Belmonte III) (c) defeated TDTxECX (Trian dela Torre and Evan Carleaux)	Tag team match for the PWR Tag Team Championship
11	Chris Panzer (c) defeated John Sebastian	Lumberjack match for the PWR Championship
(c) / – the champion(s) heading into the match; P / – the match was broadcast on the pre-show

== Vendetta (2017) ==
Vendetta (2017)
- Promotion: Philippine Wrestling Revolution
- Date: November 5, 2017
- City: Makati, Philippines
- Venue: Power Mac Center Spotlight

Event chronology
← Previous; PWR Live: Oktoberplex	Next → PWR Live: Kingdom Come

Vendetta chronology
← Previous; Vendetta (2016)	Next → Vendetta (2018)

No.	Results	Stipulations
1^{P}	Brad Cruz defeated Trabajador Tres	Singles match
2^{P}	Trabajador Quatro defeated Kapitan PWR	Singles match
3	The Network (James "Idol" Martinez and Alexander Belmonte III) (c) defeated TDTxECX (Trian dela Torre and Evan Carleaux) and Kakaibros (Kh3ndrick and Mh4rckie)	Triple threat tag team match for the PWR Tag Team Championship
4	Martivo defeated Crystal	Intergender match
5	The YOLO Twins (Yohann and Logan Ollores) (w/ Ken Warren) defeated The Regime (Tengu and Dr. Hertz)	Tag team match
6	Vlad Sinnsyk defeated The Apocalypse (c)	All Out War Match for the All Out War Championship
7	Mike Madrigal (c) defeated Bolt and Zayden Trudeau	Triple threat match for the PHX Championship
8	Vintendo defeated McKata	Singles match
9	Team Sebastian (John Sebastian, Jake de Leon, Peter Versoza, Ralph Imabayashi, and Rederick Mahaba) defeated Team Sy (PWR Champion Chris Panzer, Dax Xaviera, Joey Bax, Miguel Rosales, and SANDATA)	"Ubusan ng Lahi" match; as a result, John Sebastian seizes control of PWR, and Mr. Sy is fired as PWR General Manager
(c) / – the champion(s) heading into the match; P / – the match was broadcast on the pre-show

"Ubusan ng Lahi" match - Order of elimination

1. Joey Bax is eliminated by Jake de Leon via submission
2. Peter Versoza, by SANDATA
3. SANDATA, by Rederick Mahaba
4. Rederick Mahaba, by Chris Panzer
5. Chris Panzer, by Ralph Imabayashi
6. Dax Xaviera, by John Sebastian
7. John Sebastian, by Miguel Rosales
8. Jake de Leon, by Miguel Rosales
9. Miguel Rosales, by Ralph Imabayashi

Last man standing: Ralph Imabayashi

== PWR Live: Kingdom Come ==
PWR Live: Kingdom Come
- Promotion: Philippine Wrestling Revolution
- Date: January 21, 2018
- City: Makati, Philippines
- Venue: Power Mac Center Spotlight

Event chronology
← Previous; Vendetta (2017)	Next → PWR Live: Holding Hands While Wrestling

PWR Live chronology
← Previous; PWR Live: Oktoberplex	Next → PWR Live: Holding Hands While Wrestling

The show started with a Mahabang Usapan segment featuring Team Sebastian.

It also featured the start of a four-team tournament to determine who will be the next challengers to the PWR Tag Team Championship. Meanwhile, PHX Champion Mike Madrigal issued an open challenge for his title.

No.	Results	Stipulations
1^{P}	The Revo-Ranger defeated Trabajador Tres	Singles match
2^{P}	Quatro defeated Vintendo	Singles match
3	Bolt and Zayden Trudeau defeated Kakaibros (Kh3ndrick and Mh4rckie)	Semi-final tournament tag team match to determine the #1 contenders to the PWR Tag Team Championship
4	Robynn vs. Crystal ended in a double countout	Singles match
5	Mike Madrigal (c) defeated Ken Warren	Singles match for the PHX Championship
6	Jake de Leon defeated Brad Cruz	Singles match
7	Miguel Rosales defeated John Sebastian	Singles match. Sebastian competed under No Disqualification rules. Had Rosales lost, he would have been fired from PWR.
8	TDTxECX (Trian dela Torre and Evan Carleaux) defeated SANDATA and Dax Xaviera	Semi-final tournament tag team match to determine the #1 contenders to the PWR Tag Team Championship
9	Peter Versoza defeated Martivo	Singles match
10	The Network (James "Idol" Martinez and Alexander Belmonte III) (c) defeated The YOLO Twins (Yohann and Logan Ollores)	2-out-of-3 falls tag team match for the PWR Tag Team Championship
11	The Apocalypse defeated McKata	Singles match
12	Ralph Imabayashi defeated Chris Panzer (c)	Singles match for the PWR Championship; Rederick Mahaba served as guest referee
(c) / – the champion(s) heading into the match; P / – the match was broadcast on the pre-show

== PWR Live: Holding Hands While Wrestling ==
PWR Live: Holding Hands While Wrestling
- Promotion: Philippine Wrestling Revolution
- Date: February 11, 2018
- City: Quezon City, Philippines
- Venue: Venue 142 Events Place

Event chronology
← Previous; Vendetta (2017)	Next → Path of Gold (2018)

PWR Live chronology
← Previous; PWR Live: Kingdom Come	Next → PWR Live: Trapik

The show started with a "Championship Celebration of Love and Respect" by Rederick Mahaba for the new PWR Champion, Ralph Imabayashi. It was interrupted by Miguel Rosales.

Before the match between The Network and the team of McKata and Brad Cruz, John Sebastian officiated a rap battle between James "Idol" Martinez and McKata, which Martinez won.

At the end of the tournament to determine the #1 contenders to the PWR Tag Team Championship, John Sebastian and Crystal inserted themselves into the title match at Path of Gold, making it a triple threat match.

No.	Results	Stipulations
1^{P}	John Sebastian defeated Kapitan PWR	Singles match; had Kapitan PWR won, he would have been the new PWR General Manager
2^{P}	Quatro and Trabajador Maximo defeated Kakaibros (Kh3ndrick and Mh4rckie)	Tag team match
3	SANDATA defeated Jake de Leon	Singles match
4	Bolt and Zayden Trudeau defeated TDTxECX (Trian dela Torre and Evan Carleaux)	Tournament final tag team match to determine the #1 contenders to the PWR Tag Team Championship
5	Vintendo defeated Martivo	Singles match
6	Crystal defeated Robynn	All Out War Match
7	PHX Champion Mike Madrigal, All Out War Champion Vlad Sinnsyk, and The Apocalypse defeated Ken Warren and The YOLO Twins (Yohann and Logan Ollores)	Six-man tag team match
8	PWR Tag Team Champions The Network (James "Idol" Martinez and Alexander Belmonte III) defeated McKata and Brad Cruz	Non-title tag team match
9	The Revo-Ranger defeated Peter Versoza	Singles match
10	Miguel Rosales defeated PWR Champion Ralph Imabayashi and Rederick Mahaba	Handicap match
P / – the match was broadcast on the pre-show

== Path of Gold (2018) ==
Path of Gold (2018)
- Promotion: Philippine Wrestling Revolution
- Date: March 11, 2018
- City: Makati, Philippines
- Venue: Power Mac Center Spotlight

Event chronology
← Previous; PWR Live: Holding Hands While Wrestling	Next → PWR Live: Trapik

Path of Gold chronology
← Previous; Path of Gold (2017)	Next → Path of Gold (2019)

After the first match on the main card, Rederick Mahaba took to the mic in an in-ring segment to announce that he would enter #2 at the Path of Gold match.

No.	Results	Stipulations
1^{P}	The Revo-Ranger and Spudster defeated The Trabajadores	Tag team match; Spudster was the mascot of show sponsor Potato Corner
2^{P}	Quatro defeated Kapitan PWR	Singles match for a spot in the Path of Gold match
3	Dax Xaviera defeated Jake de Leon	Singles match
4	Mike Madrigal (c) defeated Main Maxx	Singles match for the PHX Championship
5	Vlad Sinnsyk (c) defeated The Apocalypse	All Out War Match for the All Out War Championship
6	John Sebastian and Crystal defeated The Network (Alexander Belmonte III) (c) and Zayden Trudeau and Bolt	Triple threat match for the PWR Tag Team Championship; James "Idol" Martinez was missing during the title defense
7	Ralph Imabayashi (c) defeated Chris Panzer	Singles match for the PWR Championship
8	Ralph Imabayashi (c) defeated Bombay Suarez	Singles match for the PWR Championship
9	Ken Warren won by last eliminating Jake de Leon	20-person Path of Gold match
(c) / – the champion(s) heading into the match; P / – the match was broadcast on the pre-show

Path of Gold match - Order of entry and elimination

Entry #	Wrestler	Exit #	Eliminated by
1	Miguel Rosales	18	De Leon
2	Rederick Mahaba	1	Rosales
3	Mh4rckie	5	Rosales, Quatro, Trudeau, Versoza, SANDATA, Martivo, Carleaux, L. Ollores, Warren
4	Quatro	17	De Leon
5	Zayden Trudeau	12	Versoza
6	Peter Versoza	13	Martivo, Robynn
7	SANDATA	9	De Leon
8	Alexander Belmonte III	2	Versoza
9	Martivo	16	Warren
10	Kh3ndrick	4	Warren
11	Evan Carleaux	10	Evander
12	Logan Ollores	6	Warren
13	Ken Warren	-	WINNER
14	Trian dela Torre	3	L. Ollores
15	Yohann Ollores	7	Warren
16	Jake de Leon	19	Warren
17	Dax Xaviera	8	SANDATA
18	Jan Evander, Pw.D.	14	Quatro
19	The Revo-Ranger	11	Versoza
20	Robynn	15	De Leon

== PWR Live: Trapik ==
PWR Live: Trapik
- Promotion: Philippine Wrestling Revolution
- Date: April 22, 2018
- City: Mandaluyong, Philippines
- Venue: 500 Shaw Zentrum Events Pavilion

Event chronology
← Previous; Path of Gold (2018)	Next → Wrevolution X (2018)

PWR Live chronology
← Previous; PWR Live: Holding Hands While Wrestling	Next → PWR Live: Re5peto

No.	Results	Stipulations
1^{P}	Brad Cruz defeated Kapitan PWR	Singles match
2^{P}	Quatro defeated McKata	Singles match
3	John Sebastian and Crystal (c) defeated The Network (James "Lodi" Martinez and Alexander Belmonte III)	Tag team match for the PWR Tag Team Championships
4	KakaiBros (Mh4rckie and Kh3Ndrick) vs. Main Maxx and The Apocalypse (w/ Mr. Sy) ended in a no contest	Tag team match
5	Punk Dolls (Robynn and Martivo) defeated Zayden Trudeau & Bolt	Tag team match; losers must disband
6	Peter Versoza defeated Revo Ranger	Singles match; James Martinez came out as an official to help Peter Versoza win
7	Jake De Leon defeated SANDATA and Dax Xaviera	Triple threat match
8	The YOLO Twins (Yohann and Logan Ollores) defeated Trian Dela Torre and Evan Carleaux	Tag team match
9	Vlad Sinnsyk (c) vs. Vintendo ended in a no contest	All Out War match for the All Out War Championship; Peter Versoza, James Martinez, AB3, and Revo Ranger interrupted the match
10	Miguel Rosales, Ken Warren, and Chris Panzer defeated Rederick Mahaba, PHX Champion Mike Madrigal, and PWR Champion Ralph Imabayashi	Six-man tag team match
(c) / – the champion(s) heading into the match; P / – the match was broadcast on the pre-show

== Wrevolution X (2018) ==
Wrevolution X (2018)
- Promotion: Philippine Wrestling Revolution
- Date: May 20, 2018
- City: Makati, Philippines
- Venue: iAcademy Auditorium

Event chronology
← Previous; PWR Live: Trapik	Next → PWR Live: Re5peto

Wrevolution X chronology
← Previous; Wrevolution X (2017)	Next → Wrevolution X (2019)

Ken Warren cashed in his Path of Gold Trophy for a shot at the PHX Championship.

Robin Sane of Manila Wrestling Federation also competed in this event.

No.	Results	Stipulations
1^{P}	McKata (w/ Brad Cruz) defeated Kapitan PWR	Singles match
2^{P}	Quatro defeated Trabajador Supremo	Singles match
3	John Sebastian and Crystal (c) defeated Punk Dolls (Martivo and Robynn)	Tag team match for the PWR Tag Team Championship
4	SANDATA defeated Dax Xaviera via TKO	Singles match
5	The Kakaibros (Kh3ndrick and Mh4rckie) defeated Main Maxx and The Apocalypse (w/ Mr. Sy)	Tornado tag team match
6	Alexander Belmonte III defeated Vlad Sinnsyk (c), Peter Versoza, The Revo-Ranger, James "Lodi" Martinez, and Vintendo	Six-man All Out War match for the All Out War Championship
7	The Naughty Boys (Trian dela Torre, Evan Carleaux, and Kapitan Tutan) defeated The YOLO Twins (Yohann and Logan Ollores) and Robin Sane	Six-man tag team match
8	Chris Panzer defeated Rederick Mahaba	Singles match
9	Zayden Trudeau defeated Jake de Leon	Singles match
10	Ken Warren defeated Mike Madrigal (c)	Singles match for the PHX Championship
11	Ralph Imabayashi (c) defeated Miguel Rosales	Title vs Career match for the PWR Championship; as a result, Rosales was forced to leave PWR
(c) / – the champion(s) heading into the match; P / – the match was broadcast on the pre-show

== PWR Live: Re5peto ==
PWR Live: Re5peto
- Promotion: Philippine Wrestling Revolution
- Date: June 24, 2018
- City: Mandaluyong, Philippines
- Venue: 500 Shaw Zentrum Events Pavilion

Event chronology
← Previous; Wrevolution X (2018)	Next → PWR Live: Way of the Champion

PWR Live chronology
← Previous; PWR Live: Trapik	Next → PWR Live: Way of the Champion

At this show, a No. 1 contender's tournament began to determine the next challenger to the PWR Championship.

No.	Results	Stipulations
1^{P}	Rederick Mahaba defeated The Ninjas (Ninja 1 and Ninja 2)	Handicap match
2^{P}	Rederick Mahaba defeated Samoan Papa	Singles match
3	The Apocalypse defeated PWR Tag Team Champion John Sebastian	Tournament qualifying match to determine the #1 contender to the PWR Championship
4	Main Maxx (w/ Mr. Sy) defeated PWR Tag Team Champion Crystal	Tournament qualifying match to determine the #1 contender to the PWR Championship
5	The Naughty Boys (Evan Carleaux and Trian dela Torre) defeated The Kakaibros (Kh3ndrick and Mh4rkie), Punk Dolls (Martivo and Robynn), Brad Cruz and Makata, Logan Ollores and The Revo-Ranger, and GrabCamus and Kapitan Tutan	6-team battle royal to determine the #1 contender to the PWR Tag Team Championship
6	Jake de Leon defeated All Out War Champion Alexander Belmonte III	Tournament qualifying match to determine the #1 contender to the PWR Championship
7	Dax Xaviera, Quatro, and SANDATA defeated Bolt, Jan Evander, and Vintendo	Six-man tag team match
8	Chris Panzer defeated Vlad Sinnsyk	Tournament qualifying match to determine the #1 contender to the PWR Championship
9	Ralph Imabayashi (c) defeated Zayden Trudeau via submission	Singles match for the PWR Championship
(c) / – the champion(s) heading into the match; P / – the match was broadcast on the pre-show

== PWR Live: Way of the Champion ==
PWR Live: Way of the Champion
- Promotion: Philippine Wrestling Revolution
- Date: July 22, 2018
- City: Makati, Philippines
- Venue: Power Mac Center Spotlight

Event chronology
← Previous; PWR Live: Re5peto	Next → Renaissance (2018)

PWR Live chronology
← Previous; PWR Live: Re5peto	Next → PWR Live: Homefront

During the show, Evan Carleaux hosted the Carleaux Sheaux segment, with guests PWR Tag Team Champions John Sebastian and Crystal.

Also, international wrestler Koto Hiro fought Ralph Imabayashi with the PWR Championship on the line at the main event.

No.	Results	Stipulations
1^{P}	Brad Cruz vs. McKata ended in a no contest	Singles match
2^{P}	Super Vintendo (w/ Jan Evander) defeated The Revo-Ranger	Singles match
3	Jake de Leon defeated Chris Panzer	Tournament semi-final match to determine the #1 contender to the PWR Championship
4	Mike Madrigal and McKata defeated The Kakaibros (Kh3ndrick and Mh4rckie)	Tag team match
5	Dax Xaviera vs. Quatro vs. SANDATA ended in a no contest	Three-way match to determine the #1 contender to the PHX Championship
6	Main Maxx (w/ Mr. Sy) defeated The Apocalypse	Tournament semi-final match to determine the #1 contender to the PWR Championship
7	Main Maxx (w/ Mr. Sy) defeated Jake de Leon	Tournament final to become the #1 contender to the PWR Championship
8	John Sebastian and Crystal (c) defeated The Naughty Boys (GrabCamus and Kapitan Tutan)	Tag team match for the PWR Tag Team Championship
9	The Naughty Boys (Evan Carleaux and Trian dela Torre) defeated The YOLO Twins (Johann and Logan Ollores)	Tag team match to determine the #1 contender to the PWR Tag Team Championship
10	Alexander Belmonte III (c) defeated Martivo	All Out War Match for the All Out War Championship
11	Ken Warren (c) defeated Rederick Mahaba	Singles match for the PHX Championship
12	Ralph Imabayashi (c) defeated Koto Hiro (w/ Nina)	Singles match for the PWR Championship
(c) / – the champion(s) heading into the match; P / – the match was broadcast on the pre-show

== Renaissance (2018) ==
Renaissance (2018)
- Promotion: Philippine Wrestling Revolution
- Date: August 26, 2018
- City: Makati, Philippines
- Venue: Power Mac Center Spotlight

Event chronology
← Previous; PWR Live: Way of the Champion	Next → PWR Live: Homefront

Renaissance chronology
← Previous; Renaissance (2017)	Next → Renaissance (2019)

No.	Results	Stipulations
1^{P}	The Apocalypse defeated Kapitan PWR	Singles match
2^{P}	Brad Cruz vs. McKata ended in a no contest	Singles match
3	The Kakaibros (Kh3ndrick and Mh4rckie) defeated The YOLO Twins (Johann and Logan Ollores) and Deadly Sinns (Mike Madrigal and Vlad Sinnsyk)	Three-way tag team match
4	Martivo defeated Chris Panzer	Singles match
5	Bolt and The Revo-Ranger defeated Super Vintendo and Jan Evander	Tag team match; this was originally a handicap match before Bolt announced Revo-Ranger as his tag partner
6	Alexander Belmonte III (c) defeated Dax Xaviera, Quatro, and SANDATA	Four-way All Out War Match for the All Out War Championship
7	The Naughty Boys (Evan Carleaux and Trian dela Torre) defeated John Sebastian and Crystal (c)	Tag team match for the PWR Tag Team Championship
8	Jake de Leon defeated Ken Warren (c)	Singles match for the PHX Championship
9	Mainstream Mahaba defeated Zayden Trudeau and Koto Hiro	Three-way match
10	Ralph Imabayashi (c) defeated Main Maxx	Singles match for the PWR Championship
(c) / – the champion(s) heading into the match; P / – the match was broadcast on the pre-show

== PWR Live: Homefront ==
PWR Live: Homefront
- Promotion: Philippine Wrestling Revolution
- Date: September 23, 2018
- City: Makati, Philippines
- Venue: Power Mac Center Spotlight

Event chronology
← Previous; Renaissance (2018)	Next → PWR Live: Shake, Rassle & Roll

PWR Live chronology
← Previous; PWR Live: Way of the Champion	Next → PWR Live: Shake, Rassle & Roll

International wrestlers The Ladykiller (from Singapore) and Tengu (from the United Kingdom), as well as Robin Sane from Manila Wrestling Federation competed in this event.

No.	Results	Stipulations
1^{P}	Bolt, The Revo-Ranger, and Brad Cruz defeated McKata, Samoan Papa, and Ninja 1	Six-man tag team match
2	John Sebastian defeated Robin Sane	Singles match for control of PWR; had Sane won, he would have taken Sebastian's 50% stake in PWR
3	Dax Xaviera defeated Main Maxx (w/ Mr. Sy)	Singles match
4	The YOLO Twins (Yohann and Logan Ollores) defeated The Naughty Boys (GrabCamus and Kapitan Tutan)	Tag team match
5	Ken Warren defeated Crystal	Singles match for a shot at the PHX Championship
6	Mike Madrigal defeated Vlad Sinnsyk via TKO	Singles match
7	The Naughty Boys (Evan Carleaux and Trian dela Torre) (c) defeated The Kakaibros (Kh3ndrick and Mh4rckie)	Tag team match for the PWR Tag Team Championship
8	Alexander Belmonte III (c) defeated Mainstream Mahaba	All Out War Match for the All Out War Championship
9	Martivo defeated SANDATA	Singles match
10	Ralph Imabayashi (w/ Mainstream Mahaba) (c) defeated Quatro	Singles match for the PWR Championship
11	Chris Panzer defeated The Ladykiller	Singles match
12	Jake de Leon (c) defeated Tengu via submission	Singles match for the PHX Championship
(c) / – the champion(s) heading into the match; P / – the match was broadcast on the pre-show

== PWR Live: Shake, Rassle & Roll ==
PWR Live: Shake, Rassle & Roll
- Promotion: Philippine Wrestling Revolution
- Date: October 21, 2018
- City: Mandaluyong, Philippines
- Venue: 500 Shaw Zentrum Events Pavilion

Event chronology
← Previous; PWR Live: Homefront	Next → Vendetta (2018)

PWR Live chronology
← Previous; PWR Live: Homefront	Next → PWR Live: New Year's Wrestle-ution

A scheduled match between Bolt and Dax Xaviera did not officially take place, because Xaviera attacked Bolt before the bell rang.

Malaysian wrestler Emman the Kid also competed at this event.

No.	Results	Stipulations
1^{P}	Brad Cruz defeated Samoan Papa	Singles match
2	The Naughty Boys (Evan Carleaux and Trian dela Torre) (c) defeated The Endgame (Super Vintendo and Jan Evander)	Singles match for the PWR Tag Team Championship
3	Martivo defeated John Sebastian	Singles match
4	The YOLO Twins (Yohann and Logan Ollores) defeated Kh3ndrick	Handicap match
5	Jake de Leon (c) vs. Chris Panzer vs. Ken Warren ended in a no contest	Three-way match for the PHX Championship
6	Alexander Belmonte III (c) defeated The Apocalypse	All Out War Match for the All Out War Championship
7	Vlad Sinnsyk defeated Artie 2.0 (w/ Mainstream Mahaba)	Singles match
8	Quatro defeated Emman the Kid	Singles match
9	MSG (Main Maxx and SANDATA) defeated The Naughty Boys (GrabCamus and Kapitan Tutan) via submission	Tag team match
10	Mike Madrigal defeated Ralph Imabayashi (w/ Mainstream Mahaba) (c) via DQ	Singles match for the PWR Championship; Imabayashi retained his title
(c) / – the champion(s) heading into the match; P / – the match was broadcast on the pre-show

== Vendetta (2018) ==
Vendetta (2018)
- Promotion: Philippine Wrestling Revolution
- Date: November 25, 2018
- City: Makati, Philippines
- Venue: Power Mac Center Spotlight

Event chronology
← Previous; Vendetta (2017)	Next → Vendetta (2019)

Vendetta chronology
← Previous; PWR Live: Shake, Rassle & Roll	Next → PWR Live: New Year's Wrestle-ution

International wrestlers Dr. Gore and "The Statement" Andruew Tang (from Singapore) and Aysha (from Australia) competed at this event.

No.	Results	Stipulations
1^{P}	Kapitan Tutan (w/ GrabCamus) defeated Artie 2.0	Singles match
2^{P}	Brad Cruz defeated McKata	Singles match
3	John Sebastian defeated Jake de Leon (c), "The Statement" Andruew Tang, Chris Panzer, Crystal, and Ken Warren	Six-way Survival elimination match for the PHX Championship
4	Martivo defeated Aysha	Intergender match
5	Bolt, Joey Bax, and The Revo-Ranger defeated The Endgame(Super Vintendø, Jan Evander, and The Apocalypse)	Six-man tag team match
6	The YOLO Twins (Yohann and Logan Ollores) defeated The Kakaibros (Kh3ndrick and Mh4rckie)	"Edi Sa Puso Mo" street fight match
7	Dax Xaviera defeated Alexander Belmonte III (c)	All Out War match for the All Out War Championship
8	The Naughty Boys (Evan Carleaux and Trian dela Torre)(w/ Jhemherlynn) (c) defeated MSG (Main Maxx and SANDATA) (w/ Mr. Sy)	Tag team match for the PWR Tag Team Championship
9	Quatro defeated Dr. Gore	Singles match
10	Ralph Imabayashi (c) defeated Mainstream Mahaba, Mike Madrigal, and Vlad Sinnsyk	Four-way match for the PWR Championship
(c) / – the champion(s) heading into the match; P / – the match was broadcast on the pre-show

== PWR Live: New Year's Wrestle-ution ==
PWR Live: New Year's Wrestle-ution
- Promotion: Philippine Wrestling Revolution
- Date: January 27, 2019
- City: Makati, Philippines
- Venue: Power Mac Center Spotlight

Event chronology
← Previous; Vendetta (2018)	Next → PWR Live: Nice!

PWR Live chronology
← Previous; PWR Live: Shake, Rassle & Roll	Next → PWR Live: Nice!

International wrestler "El Guapo" Carlos Zamora competed at the pre-show.

No.	Results	Stipulations
1^{P}	Jaye Sera defeated Jhemherlynn	Singles match
2^{P}	"El Guapo" Carlos Zamora defeated Kapitan PWR	Singles match
3	Vlad Sinnsyk defeated Super Vintendo	Singles match
4	Quatro defeated Mike Madrigal via submission	Singles match
5	Punk Dolls (Martivo and Robynn) defeated The Kakaibros (Kh3ndrick and Mh4rckie) and MSG (Main Maxx and SANDATA) (w/ Mr. Sy)	Three-way tag team tournament semi-finals match to determine #1 contender to the PWR Tag Team Championship
6	Crystal defeated Chris Panzer	Intergender match
7	Dax Xaviera (c) defeated Alexander Belmonte III	All Out War match for the All Out War Championship
8	Ken Warren defeated Jan Evander	Singles match
9	The YOLO Twins (Yohann and Logan Ollores) defeated The Naughty Boys (GrabCamus and Kapitan Tutan) and Bolt and The Revo-Ranger	Three-way tag team tournament semi-finals match to determine #1 contender to the PWR Tag Team Championship
10	Jake de Leon defeated John Sebastian (c) via DQ	Singles match for the PHX Championship; Sebastian retained his title
11	The Naughty Boys (Evan Carleaux and Trian dela Torre) defeated PWR Champion Ralph Imabayashi and Cali Nueva via submission	Tag team match for the PWR Tag Team Championship
(c) / – the champion(s) heading into the match; P / – the match was broadcast on the pre-show

== PWR Live: Nice! ==
PWR Live: Nice!
- Promotion: Philippine Wrestling Revolution
- Date: February 17, 2019
- City: Makati, Philippines
- Venue: Power Mac Center Spotlight

Event chronology
← Previous; PWR Live: New Year's Wrestle-ution	Next → Path of Gold (2019)

PWR Live chronology
← Previous; PWR Live: New Year's Wrestle-ution	Next → PWR Live: Destino

No.	Results	Stipulations
1^{P}	The Revo-Ranger defeated GrabCamus	Singles match
2^{P}	"El Guapo" Carlos Zamora defeated Kapitan Tutan	Singles match
3	Super Vintendo defeated Alexander Belmonte III	Singles match
4	MSG (Main Maxx and SANDATA) defeated The Kakaibros (Kh3ndrick and Mh4rckie)	Tag team match
5	Jaye Sera and Cali Nueva defeated Trian dela Torre and Jhemherlynn	Mixed tag team match
6	Mike Madrigal defeated Quatro	Singles match; as a result, Quatro enters #1 in the Path of Gold Match at Path of Gold (2019).
7	John Sebastian (c) defeated Chris Panzer (w/ Mr. Sy)	Singles match for the PHX Championship
8	Ken Warren defeated Chino Guinto and Jan Evander	Three-way match for a shot at the PHX Championship
9	Dax Xaviera (c) defeated Joey Bax	Singles match for the All Out War Championship
10	The YOLO Twins (Yohann and Logan Ollores) defeated Punk Dolls (Martivo and Robynn)	Tournament final to become the #1 contenders to the PWR Tag Team Championship
11	Vlad Sinnsyk defeated Jake de Leon	Singles match
12	Ralph Imabayashi (c) defeated Evan Carleaux	Singles match for the PWR Championship
(c) / – the champion(s) heading into the match; P / – the match was broadcast on the pre-show

== Path of Gold (2019) ==
Path of Gold (2019)
- Promotion: Philippine Wrestling Revolution
- Date: , 2019
- City: Makati, Philippines
- Venue: Power Mac Center Spotlight

Event chronology
← Previous; PWR Live: Nice!	Next → PWR Live: Destino

PWR Live chronology
← Previous; Path of Gold (2018)	Next → Path of Gold (2020)

Multiple international wrestlers competed at this event: "Dynomite Soul" Eric Walker (from USA) and Masa Takanashi, DJ Nira, and Emi Sakura (all from Japan).

No.	Results	Stipulations
1^{P}	Jhemherlhynn defeated Jaye Sera via submission	Singles match
2^{P}	Cali Nueva defeated Kapitan Tutan	Singles match
3	The YOLO Twins (Yohann and Logan Ollores) defeated The Naughty Boys (Evan Carleaux and Trian dela Torre) (w/ The Kakaibros) (c)	Tag team match for the PWR Tag Team Championship
4	Chris Panzer defeated "Dynomite Soul" Eric Walker	Path of Gold qualifying match
5	Jake de Leon and Vlad Sinnsyk defeated Masa Takanashi and DJ Nira	Tag team match
6	Dax Xaviera (c) defeated Robynn	All Out War match for the All Out War Championship
7	John Sebastian (c) defeated Ken Warren	Singles match for the PHX Championship
8	Emi Sakura defeated Crystal	Singles match
9	Ralph Imabayashi (c) defeated Rederick Mahaba via TKO	Singles match for the PWR Championship
10	Quatro won by last eliminating Mike Madrigal	20-person Path of Gold match
(c) / – the champion(s) heading into the match; P / – the match was broadcast on the pre-show

Path of Gold match - Order of entry and elimination

Entry #	Wrestler	Exit #	Eliminated by
1	Quatro	-	WINNER
2	Jan Evander	15	Guinto
3	Alexander Belmonte III	12	Evander, Super Vintendo
4	Kh3ndrick	7	Quatro
5	Evan Carleaux	6	Mh4rckie
6	The Revo-Ranger	9	Evander, Super Vintendo
7	Chino Guinto	17	Madrigal
8	Main Maxx	4	Mh4rckie
9	Chris Panzer	1	Main Maxx, SANDATA
10	SANDATA	3	Kh3ndrick
11	Ken Warren	2	Main Maxx, SANDATA
12	Mh4rckie	8	Quatro
13	Vlad Sinnsyk	18	Quatro
14	Trian dela Torre	5	Kh3ndrick
15	Martivo	16	Madrigal
16	Joey Bax	10	Evander, Super Vintendo
17	Super Vintendo	14	Guinto
18	Brad Cruz	11	Evander, Super Vintendo
19	Mike Madrigal	19	Quatro
20	James "Idol" Martinez	13	Evander

== Event posters ==
Vendetta (2015)

Wrevolution X (2015)
