= Jake de Leon =

Filipino professional wrestler (born 1992)

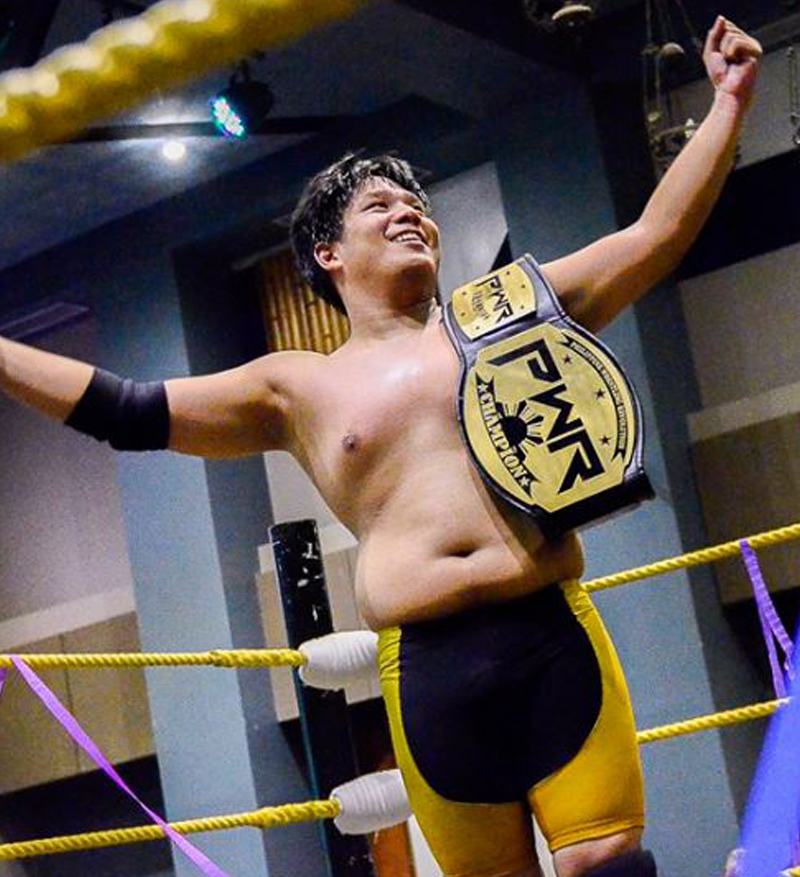
- Jake De Leon at Wrevolution X in 2016

Personal information
- Born: Mark Gabriel G. Javellana; June 18, 1992 (age 34) Bacolod, Philippines.

Professional wrestling career
- Billed height: 5 ft 6 in (168 cm)
- Billed weight: 190 lb (86 kg)
- Billed from: Hacienda de Leon, Bacolod, Negros Occidental
- Trained by: Bombay Suarez, Billy Suede, Kai Katana, So Sai King, Chilly Willy
- Debut: September 27, 2014

Mark Gabriel G. Javellana, better known by his ring name "The Senyorito" Jake de Leon, is a Filipino professional wrestler most commonly known for his time with Philippine Wrestling Revolution. He is the current SETUP Thailand 24/7 Champion and DEXCON World Champion.

== Early life ==
Mark Gabriel G. Javellana is a native of Bacolod, Negros Occidental and is a real-life son of a haciendero (landlord). Javellana studied high school in University of St. La Salle–Integrated School.

== Professional wrestling career ==
=== Philippine Wrestling Revolution (2014–2020) ===
==== PWR Champion and various storylines (2014–2017) ====
Javellana is one of the founders of the Philippine Wrestling Revolution and performs under the ring name Jake de Leon. De Leon, using his real-life status as a son of a landlord and a Bacolod native, would incorporate this into his character's gimmick. In February 2015, De Leon won the right to fight for the PWR Championship by defeating Chris Panzer at Vendetta 2015. On May 23, 2015, at Wrevolution X, De Leon then defeated Bombay Suarez to become the inaugural PWR Champion. However, later that same night, "Classical" Bryan Leo would use the opportunity that Mr. Sy gave him earlier in the show after defeating Mayhem Brannigan for a future shot at the PWR Championship, and subsequently defeated De Leon, becoming the new champion.

De Leon won the inaugural Path of Gold Tournament at PWR: Terminus for the right to face then PWR Champion Ralph Imabayashi, who was defeated by "Classical" Bryan Leo. The scheduled match would then turn into a triple threat match for the PWR Championship at Wrevolution X 2016. De Leon would regain the PWR Championship when he defeated Leo and Imabayashi at Wrevolution X. In August 2016, PWR held its first ever house show with Asia Pop Comic Convention in which Jake successfully defended his title in three matches throughout the course of the three-day event. De Leon would lose the title to John Sebastian in the first ever Bacolod Bullrope Match in November at PWR Live: Suplex Sunday. De Leon would fail to regain the title in a subsequent rematch in January the following year at PWR Live: Bagong Yugto.

At Wrevolution X 2017, De Leon would face-off against recently debuting "Beautiful" Billy Suede, in response to Suede's demand for "real competition" in PWR following a quick victory over McKata at PWR Live: Mainit. De Leon would go on to defeat Suede in a highly regarded "Match of the Year" contender in the Philippines. At Renaissance, De Leon would face Ralph Imabayashi and defending PWR Champion Chris Panzer in a Triple Threat match, but failed to win the title when De Leon had the Inasal Lock on Imabayashi, allowing Panzer to hit both men with the Eagle Splash and retain the title. Following their losses, De Leon and Imabayashi would continue to be embroiled in a feud, culminating with a "Matira Matibay" (last man standing) match at PWR Live: Bakbakan sa Bayanihan, which saw De Leon lose to Imabayashi. De Leon was one of the participants in the PHX Championship Tournament held during the 2017 Asia Pop Comic Con, where he was eliminated in the first round by Vlad Sinnsyk. A rematch was made between the two a week later at PWR Live: Sugod! During the final moments of the match, De Leon wiggled out of a Muscle Buster then rolled up Sinnsyk for the win. Sinnsyk, upset with the result, continued assaulting De Leon, ending with the former hitting De Leon with a Muscle Buster on the ring apron. It was later reported that De Leon had suffered a herniated disc from the attack by Sinnsyk.

==== Alliance with John Sebastian and Various Feuds (2017–2018) ====
De Leon would make his return two months later at Vendetta as a heel, revealing himself to be John Sebastian's fifth man in a bid to wrestle control of the company from General Manager Sy in an "Ubusan ng Lahi" (5-on-5 elimination) match. During the match De Leon eliminated Joey Bax with the Inasal Lock but was in turn eliminated by Miguel Rosales. Imbayashi, however, sealed the win for team Sebastian.

The start of 2018 saw De Leon face Brad Cruz in a winning effort via submission during PWR Live: Kingdome Come. Later during the event he would attack SANDATA and Dax Xaviera, who were fresh from defeat in their first round match for the Tag Team #1 Contender's Tournament. De Leon would be scheduled to face SANDATA at PWR Live: Holding Hands While Wrestling. SANDATA won the match after interference from Xaviera. De Leon then faced Xaviera at the Path of Gold event before entering the namesake tournament. De Leon would dominate the bout against Xaviera until SANDATA came out to interfere in the match. De Leon, however, would take advantage of a slight miscommunication between Xaviera and SANDATA, but would still come up short, with Xaviera catching him with a surprise pin for the victory. Later in the namesake tournament, De Leon entered as the 16th entry. During the match, De Leon eliminated SANDATA before he and Ken Warren became the last two survivors, with the latter winning the tournament. De Leon would face SANDATA and Xaviera in a triple threat match at PWR Live: Trapik. During the match, De Leon delivered a double Alipin Drop on SANDATA and Xaviera, and later won the match via submission after placing Xaviera in a new form of Inasal Lock. After the match, Jake declared that he is ready to take on new challengers, and dared anyone who wants to be "on his level" to face him at Wrevolution X. Zayden Trudeau would answer his challenge, setting up the match between the two for Wrevolution X. De Leon lost to Trudeau via pinfall.

==== Championship Pursuits and PHX Champion (2018–2019) ====
Jake once again set his sights on the PWR Championship, taking part in a #1 Contender's Tournament for the said title. He faced the reigning All Out War Champion Alexander Belmonte III in the first round of the tournament at PWR Live: Respeto (stylized RE5PETO), winning via pinfall to advance to the second round. The second round of the tournament was contested at PWR Live: Way of the Champion, in which Jake faced Chris Panzer in a winning effort to advance to the finals facing either Main Maxx or The Apocalypse. Later on in the show, Main Maxx defeated The Apocalypse to face De Leon in the finals. After the match, PWR General Manager John Sebastian announced that the finals will commence immediately after the Maxx-Apocalypse match, which saw Maxx go on to defeat De Leon, earning himself an opportunity for the PWR Championship at Renaissance the following month. On the same show, following a successful title defense over Rederick Mahaba, PHX Champion Ken Warren issued an open challenge for his title at Renaissance, which De Leon promptly answered. De Leon would then beat Warren to become the PHX Champion. De Leon became the first person to have held the PHX Champion and the PWR Championship on separate occasions. He is also the third man after John Sebastian and Alexander Belmonte III to hold two different PWR Championship Titles. Moments after the match, a cryptic video revealed that London Luncha League's Tengu shall face De Leon for the title in PWR: Homefront.

Jake was able to defend his title against Tengu. After a show of respect between the two, Tengu attacked Jake post-match. Ken Warren made the save and attempted to hit Jake with the title but Chris Panzer stopped him. Both men received a superkick from Jake. Jake defended the title against Warren and Panzer in PWR: Shaker, Rassle and Roll. The match ended in a no-contest after Crystal interrupted the match by attacking all participants with a kendo stick. Jake then defended the title in PWR: Vendetta in a Six Pack Elimination Challenge against Warren, Panzer, Crystal, Sebastian and Andreuw "The Statement" Tang. He was last eliminated by eventual winner John Sebastian. Jake faced Sebastian on PWR: Wrestle-lution for a chance to reclaim the title. During the match, Sebastian delivered a low-blow, causing Jake to win via disqualification. However, the title remained with Sebastian since championships can only be won by pin-fall or submission. Jake faced and lost to Panzer in a house show during Mata Expo 2019. On PWR: Nice, Jake faced Sinnsyk in a grudge match where he lost via pinfall. The two would then face Masa Takanashi & DJ Nira of DDT Wrestling in a tag team match during PWR: Path of Gold in which they won.

Jake was scheduled to face Mike Madrigal in PWR: Destino but the latter refused. Jake would then team up with Bolt to face Sandata and Main Maxx of the Mr. Sy Group. During the match, the top turnbuckle gave out when Jake attempted one of his patented reversals. Later, a video interrupted the match showing Madrigal beating Jake's former trainer, Bombay Suarez. The distraction allowed SG to pick up a major win against a former PWR Champion. Jake then faced Madrigal on PWR: Wrevolution X with the stipulation that if he loses, he leaves PWR. He beat Madrigal via technical knockout. In PWR: Championship Spirit, Jake faced Shaukat of Malaysia pro Wrestling in a winning effort. In PWR: Beautiful, Jake partnered with Ken Warren in a tag match against SPW Southeast Asia Champion Andruew Tang and former champion Trexxus of Singapore Pro Wrestling. Jake previously fought the two for the SPW Southeast Asia Championship in Singapore. Jake and Warren won the match. Jake faced former WWE Cruiserweight champion, T. J. Perkins in PWR: Homecoming. Jake caught TJP with the Inasal Lock but TJP countered and turned it into a pinfall win.

==== Final storylines and departure (2020) ====
During PWR: Love at First Fight, Jake, Ken Warren faced Jhemherlhynn and Cali Nueva in a tag team match. Jhemherlhynn and Nueva won the match after Quatro made an entrance distracting Jake and Warren.

In July 2020, Jake along with ten other wrestlers and staff filed a joint resignation citing bullying and toxic company culture. Their departure notably coincided with the suspension of several wrestlers, including fellow departee Chris Panzer, after allegations of sexual harassment in the local wrestling community surfaced in the wake of the #SpeakingOut and #MeToo movements.

=== Manila Wrestling Federation (since 2022) ===
In the second season MWF Aksyonovela TV premiere, Jake De Leon made his comeback alongside his #PWOGs tag team partner Ken Warren. In MWF Road To Fate 2022, Jake De Leon won his first MWF Championship, becoming the third man to hold the title after defeating Fabio Makisig and Nigel San Jose in a 3-Way Elimination Match.

=== Appearances in other wrestling promotions ===
==== Asia Wrestling Entertainment (2017) ====
Jake and John Sebastian competed against Dennis Hui and Nyc Lee in a tag team match in Asia Wrestling Entertainment: Adventus last December 17, 2017 in Kuala Lumpur, Malaysia.

==== Singapore Pro Wrestling (2018–2019) ====
In June 2018, Jake participated in a tag match in Singapore Pro Wrestling: Triple Thrill Series Part 3: SPW Vs. The World where he partnered with Manila Wrestling Federation's Robin Sane losing against The Horrors. On February 22, 2019, Jake faced Andreuw "The Statement" Tang and Trexxus in a three-way match at SPW: Boiling Point for the South East Asian Championship which ended in a no-contest. Jake faced Tang, Trexxus, Ivan Markov in a fatal four-way match in SPW: Atonement in which Tang won.

==== Manila Wrestling Federation (2018) ====
In September 2018, Jake made a special appearance in Manila Wrestling Federation: Road to Fate. While delivering his speech, Mr. Lucha interrupted and berated Jake. The two had a brief brawl until Mr. Lucha delivered a low blow that disarmed Jake. Later, Mr. Lucha's won his match against the Eurasian Dragon, in which Jake returned to the ring and delivered a Senyorito Kick and an Alipin Drop to Mr. Lucha. The show came to a close with Jake and the Eurasian Dragon standing tall over Mr. Lucha. On October 28, 2018, Jake and Mr. Lucha finally faced each other in an official match. Billed as Philippine Wrestling Revolution VS Manila Wrestling Federation, Jake, Sebastian and Chris Panzer faced Mr. Lucha, Robin Sane and Ninja Ryujin in a 6-man tag match in MWF: Todos Los Wrestling in which PWR won. To settle their rivalry, Jake faced Mr. Lucha on MWF: Noche Buena in which the latter won. The two then earned each other's respect.

==== Asia Pro-Wrestling Summit (2018) ====
Jake and Sebastian participated in a three-way tag team match in 2018 Sawasdee Cup Asia Pro-Wrestling Summit on October 23, 2018.

== Personal life ==
Outside his ring persona, Javellana works in the field of Digital Marketing.

Javellana along with Ken Warren and Crystal joined a WWE try-out held in China in July 2020.

== Championships and accomplishments ==
- PUSO Wrestling
  - Pusong Pinoy Championship (1 time)
- DXCN Pro Wrestling
  - DXCN World Championship (1 time, inaugural, current)
- Manila Wrestling Federation
  - MWF Championship (2 times)
- Philippine Wrestling Revolution
  - PWR Championship (2 times, inaugural)
  - PHX Championship (1 time)
  - Path of Gold (2015)
- SETUP Thailand Pro Wrestling
  - SETUP Thailand 24/7 Championship (6 times)
  - IWA Japan-SETUP Thailand World Tag Team Championship (1 time)- with (Andruew Tang, Chris Brookes, Emman Azman, and Shivam) (Note: Jake De Leon defended the championship with either Andruew Tang, Chris Brookes, Emman Azman, or Shivam under the Freebird Rule.)

=== Luchas de Apuestas record ===
Winner (wager)	Loser (wager)	Location	Event	Date	Notes
Jake De Leon, John Sebastian, Ralph Imabayashi, Rederick Mahaba & Peter Versoza (Control of PWR)	Chris Panzer, SANDATA, Joey Bax, Miguel Rosales & Dax Xaviera (Control of PWR)	Power Mac Center Spotlight, Makati	PWR: Vendetta	November 5, 2017	As a consequence, John Sebastian takes control of PWR
