= Philippine Wrestling Revolution =

Professional wrestling promotion in the Philippines

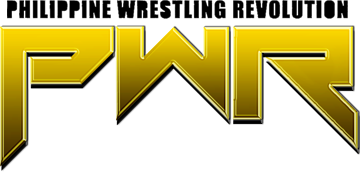
- Acronym: PWR
- Founded: December 22, 2013
- Defunct: September 14, 2022
- Style: Professional wrestling
- Owner(s): Red Ollero (President) Lynch Imbat (Vice President) Timothy Ng (Executive Director)

Philippine Wrestling Revolution (PWR) was an independent professional wrestling promotion based in the Philippines. PWR was founded in December 2013, and closed on September 14, 2022.

== History ==
Professional wrestling in the Philippines started in 1989 through the short-lived show called "Pinoy Wrestling". It aired on national television via PTV-4, with character actor Johnny Revilla as host and ringside reporter comedian Jimmy Fabregas. Its roster consisted of locally trained wrestlers such as Joe Pogi, King Cobra, Macho Franco, Caloy Bakal, and Max Buwaya. There were also tag teams such as The Smoky Mountain Brothers, The Bakal Boys, and Dr. Q's henchmen The Brusko Brothers, Kamikaze Kid and Roboto. Women wrestlers like Aerobica and Pinay Wonder and midgets such as The Mikrobyos and The Tureritos were also featured. Other wrestlers include Juan Duwag, Waway The Wild Man, Turko Turero, Pinoy Ranger, Sultan Bato, Iggy Igorot, Lawin and Zorro. The show was discontinued in the early part of 1990.

In 2012, the idea of forming PWR was born in a Facebook group. Wrestling fans from different parts of the country linked up and were added to the group to establish a wrestling company, discuss fantasy bookings, and conceptualize characters and gimmicks. This came about despite pro wrestling not being as popular in the Philippines since the end of the WWF Attitude Era in the late 1990s and early 2000s as well as the exposure of kayfabe. The upstart promotion got an assist from veteran American pro wrestler Joe E. Legend, who helped them in the preparations.

Sometime between late 2013 and early 2014, the group was contacted by a Japanese promoter Ankei Tamashiro doing a show in the Philippines for WNC-Reina, where two of the main attractions were former WWE and ECW superstar Tajiri and half-Filipina triple crown champion Shuri Kondo. The Japanese promoter's representative in Manila found PWR's Facebook page and asked the group to assist them in setting up and promoting the show in the country. These events further encouraged the group to pursue the idea of setting up the first-ever wrestling promotion in the country.

The pioneer batch of aspiring professional wrestlers were officially trained by an American pro wrestler Josh Bauserman, whom they met in Manila during the early stages of planning. The founders credit Bauserman for teaching them everything about pro wrestling, from in-ring maneuvers to backstage activities.

In recent years, PWR has expanded its reach, with international wrestlers such as Billy Suede and Koto Hiro performing for circuit while its own roster of wrestlers participates in inter-promotional matches abroad.

In 2017, WWE officials were in attendance during PWR Live: Bagong Yugto solidifying PWR's presence in the international community.

=== Impact of the COVID-19 pandemic ===
Like many sports promotions affected by the COVID-19 pandemic, PWR cancelled their planned live events for the rest of 2020, for the safety of their performers, staff, and crew, as well as that of the "Revo-Nation" (PWR's nickname for its fans and audience). As of March 2021, it has yet to hold a live event due to ongoing restrictions on public gatherings in the Philippines to prevent the spread of COVID-19.

On March 12, 2020, PWR announced that the Path of Gold event, originally scheduled for March 22, will not push through. Their performance at the intermission of that year's Rakrakan Festival (which was itself rescheduled to April, from February, and later cancelled) eventually did not take place as well. PWR's flagship event Wrevolution X was likewise cancelled. PWR President Red Ollero, in an episode of the promotion's "Wrestle From Home" Facebook show, said that Wrevolution X was supposed to be held on May 31, 2020.

In a separate interview in an episode of the Wrestling-Wrestling Podcast, Ollero said that he had considered holding shows without a crowd in an undisclosed location, but that hasn't really come to fruition yet due to the country's quarantine protocols.

PWR also originally planned in 2020 a sequel to the PWR Special: Homecoming event. Ollero revealed in the October 5 pilot episode of PWR's Philippine Wrestling Podcast that "Homecoming 2" was supposed to happen at the SM SkyDome.

While it wasn't able to hold live events yet, PWR sought to continue connecting with their fans online through the "Wrestle From Home" Facebook show from March to June 2020 and the Philippine Wrestling Podcast from October to December 2020. PWR also made available the PWR Special: Homecoming (2019) event for streaming through the virtual events space Stream from May 31 to July 31, 2020.

== Events ==
The promotion held its inaugural event called Renaissance on September 27, 2014, at the Makati Cinema Square Arena, Makati.

PWR then held subsequent events to complete its calendar: Terminus, Vendetta, Path of Gold, and Wrevolution X, which is considered to be PWR's WrestleMania equivalent.

On August 15, 2015, PWR held an event called PWR Live, still at the Makati Cinema Square Arena. Multiple events named PWR Live have been staged since.

To date, 2 PWR shows have been aired on television (on tape delay) via TV5: Terminus (2014) and PWR Live (August 2015)

On February 5, 2016, PWR held a house show at the LBD Sports Arena in Candelaria, Quezon, its first outside Metro Manila.

=== List of events ===
==== 2014 ====
Event	Date	Venue	Location	Main event
Renaissance	September 27, 2014	Makati Square Arena	Makati	"The Senyorito" Jake de Leon vs. "Classical" Bryan Leo
Terminus	December 13, 2014	Makati Square Arena	Makati	Bombay Suarez and Jake de Leon vs. Bryan Leo and Main Maxx

==== 2015 ====
Event	Date	Venue	Location	Main event
Vendetta	February 21, 2015	Makati Square Arena	Makati	Jake de Leon vs. Chris Panzer
Wrevolution X	May 23, 2015	Makati Square Arena	Makati	Jake de Leon vs. Bombay Suarez for the inaugural PWR Championship Jake de Leon (c) vs Bryan Leo (Bryan Leo cashes in his title opportunity as promised by Mr. Sy)
PWR Live	August 15, 2015	Makati Square Arena	Makati	Bryan Leo (c) vs Jake de Leon for the PWR Championship
Renaissance	September 26, 2015	Makati Square Arena	Makati	Bryan Leo (c) vs. Jake de Leon vs. The Apocalypse for the PWR Championship
PWR Live	November 28, 2015	iAcademy Auditorium	Makati	"Classical" Bryan Leo (c) vs. Mark D. Manalo for the PWR Championship
Terminus	December 19, 2015	iAcademy Auditorium	Makati	Bryan Leo (c) vs. Ralph Imabayashi for the PWR Championship

==== 2016 ====
Event	Date	Venue	Location	Main event
PWR Live: Road to Vendetta	January 31, 2016	iAcademy Auditorium	Makati	Ralph Imabayashi (c) vs. The Apocalypse in an open challenge for the PWR Championship
PWR on Tour: Quezon Invasion (house show)	February 5, 2016	LDB Sports Arena	Candelaria, Quezon	Ralph Imabayashi (c) vs. Peter Versoza in an open challenge for the PWR Championship
Vendetta	February 20, 2016	iAcademy Auditorium	Makati	Ralph Imabayashi (c) vs. Bryan Leo for the PWR Championship
PWR Live: Manila Madness	March 5, 2016	Tanduay Covered Court	Manila	Ken Warren (c) vs Bombay Suarez vs Chris Panzer for the PHX Championship
PWR Live: Road to Wrevolution X	April 23, 2016	BF Homes Covered Court	Parañaque	The Royal Flush vs Jake de Leon, Ralph Imabayashi and Chris Panzer
Wrevolution X	May 28, 2016	iAcademy Auditorium	Makati	Bryan Leo (c) vs Jake de Leon vs Ralph Imabayashi for the PWR Championship
PWR on Tour: Batanes Beatdown (house show)	June 24, 2016		Batanes	Jake de Leon (c) vs Bryan Leo vs The Apocalypse for the PWR Championship
PWR Live: The ShawDown	July 30, 2016	500 Shaw Zentrum Events Pavilion	Mandaluyong	Jake de Leon vs Main Maxx in a non-title PWR Champion vs PHX Champion challenge
PWR at Asia Pop Comic Con 2016 (house show)	August 26–28, 2016	SMX Convention Center	Pasay	Day 1: Jake de Leon (c) vs Ralph Imabayashi for the PWR Championship Day 2: Jake de Leon (c) vs Ken Warren for the PWR Championship Day 3: Jake de Leon (c) vs The Apocalypse for the PWR Championship
Renaissance	October 8, 2016	Bayanihan Center	Pasig	Jake de Leon (c) vs John Sebastian for the PWR Championship
PWR Live: Suplex Sunday	November 13, 2016	Bayanihan Center	Pasig	Jake de Leon (c) vs John Sebastian in a Bacolod Bullrope Match for the PWR Championship

==== 2017 ====
Event	Date	Venue	Location	Main event
PWR Live: Bagong Yugto	January 29, 2017	Venue 142 Events Place	Quezon City	John Sebastian (c) vs Jake de Leon for the PWR Championship
Path of Gold	February 26, 2017	Bayanihan Center	Pasig	20-person Path of Gold Match. Winner gets to challenge either the PWR or PHX Champion.
PWR Live: Mainit	March 19, 2017	Bayanihan Center	Pasig	John Sebastian (c) vs Main Maxx for the PWR Championship
Wrevolution X	April 30, 2017	Bayanihan Center	Pasig	John Sebastian (c) vs Chris Panzer for the PWR Championship
PWR Live: Resbak	May 28, 2017	Foton Showroom	Makati	Chris Panzer (c) vs John Sebastian in a 2 out of 3 Falls Match for the PWR Championship
PWR Unfather's Day show (house show)	June 18, 2017	Eastwood Mall	Quezon City	Chris Panzer (c) vs Billy Suede for the PWR Championship
Renaissance	June 25, 2017	Playland, Fisher Mall	Quezon City	Chris Panzer (c) vs Ralph Imabayashi vs Jake De Leon in a Triple Threat Match for the PWR Championship
PWR Live: Bakbakan sa Bayanihan	July 23, 2017	Bayanihan Center	Pasig	Chris Panzer (c) vs Billy Suede for the PWR Championship
PWR at Asia Pop Comic Con 2017 (house show)	August 25–27, 2017	SMX Convention Center	Pasay	Day 1: Billy Suede (c) vs Chris Panzer for the PWR Championship Day 2: The YOLO Twins (c) vs The Network for the PWR Tag Team Championship Day 3: PHX Championship tournament final
PWR Live: Sugod!	September 3, 2017	Power Mac Center Spotlight	Makati	Billy Suede (c) vs Chris Panzer vs Ralph Imabayashi in a Triple Threat Match for the PWR Championship
PWR Live: Oktoberplex	October 8, 2017	Power Mac Center Spotlight	Makati	Chris Panzer (c) vs John Sebastian in a Lumberjack Match for the PWR Championship
Vendetta	November 5, 2017	Power Mac Center Spotlight	Makati	Ubusan ng Lahi: Team Sy vs. Team Sebastian for control of PWR

==== 2018 ====
Event	Date	Venue	Location	Main event
PWR Live: Kingdom Come	January 21, 2018	Power Mac Center Spotlight	Makati	Chris Panzer (c) vs. Ralph Imabayashi for the PWR Championship
PWR Live: Holding Hands While Wrestling	February 11, 2018	Venue 142 Events Place	Quezon City	Rederick Mahaba and PWR Champion Ralph Imabayashi vs. Miguel Rosales in a Handicap Match
Path of Gold	March 11, 2018	Power Mac Center Spotlight	Makati	20-person Path of Gold Match. Winner gets to face any champion in PWR.
PWR Live: Trapik	April 22, 2018	500 Shaw Events Pavilion	Mandaluyong	Miguel Rosales, Chris Panzer and Ken Warren vs. Ralph Imabayashi, Rederick Mahaba and Mike Madrigal in a 6-Man tag team match
Wrevolution X	May 20, 2018	iAcademy Auditorium	Makati	Ralph Imabayashi (c) vs. Miguel Rosales in a Title vs. Career Match for the PWR Championship: Had Rosales lose, he is forced to be retired.
PWR Live: Re5peto	June 24, 2018	500 Shaw Events Pavilion	Mandaluyong	Ken Warren (c) vs. Mike Madrigal in a Three Stages of Death Match for the PHX Championship.
PWR Live: Way Of The Champion	July 22, 2018	Power Mac Center Spotlight	Makati	Ralph Imabayashi (c) vs. Koto Hiro w/ Nina for the PWR Championship.
Renaissance	August 26, 2018	Power Mac Center Spotlight	Makati	Ralph Imabayashi (c) vs. Main Maxx w/ Mr. Sy for the PWR Championship.
PWR Live: Homefront	September 23, 2018	Power Mac Center Spotlight	Makati	Jake De Leon (c) vs. Tengu for the PHX Championship.
PWR Live: Shake, Rassle & Roll	October 21, 2018	500 Shaw Events Pavilion	Mandaluyong	Ralph Imabayashi (c) vs. Mike Madrigal for the PWR Championship.
Vendetta	November 25, 2018	Power Mac Center Spotlight	Makati	Ralph Imabayashi (c) vs. Mike Madrigal vs. Mainstream Mahaba vs. Vlad Sinnsyk in a Fatal-4 Way match for the PWR Championship.

==== 2019 ====
Event	Date	Venue	Location	Main event
PWR Live: New Year's Wrestle-ution	January 27, 2019	Power Mac Center Spotlight	Makati	The Naughty Boys (c) vs. Ralph Imabayashi and Cali Nueva for the PWR Tag Team Championships.
PWR Live: Nice!	February 17, 2019	Power Mac Center Spotlight	Makati	Ralph Imabayashi (c) vs. Evan Carleaux for the PWR Championship
Path of Gold	March 17, 2019	Power Mac Center Spotlight	Makati	20-person Path of Gold Match. Winner gets to face any champion in PWR.
PWR Live: Destino	April 28, 2019	Power Mac Center Spotlight	Makati	PWR Champion Ralph Imabayashi, PWR Tag Team Champions The YOLO Twins, and The Kakaibros vs. Quatro, Trian Dela Torre, Evan Carleaux, Kapitan Tutan and Jhemherlhynn
Wrevolution X	May 26, 2019	Power Mac Center Spotlight	Makati	Ralph Imabayashi (c) vs. Quatro for the PWR Championship in a 2 out of 3 falls match
PWR Live: Pak Ganern	June 30, 2019	Power Mac Center Spotlight	Makati	Quatro (c) vs. Ralph Imabayashi in a Matira Matibay match for the PWR Championship
PWR Live: Championship Spirit	July 28, 2019	Power Mac Center Spotlight	Makati	Riho (c) vs. Jibzy vs. Crystal vs. Jaye Sera in a Fatal-4 Way match for the Queen of Asia Championship
Renaissance	August 25, 2019	Power Mac Center Spotlight	Makati	Quatro (c) vs. Andrew Carter for the PWR Championship
PWR Live: Beautiful	September 22, 2019	500 Shaw Events Pavilion	Mandaluyong	Quatro (c) vs. Chris Panzer for the PWR Championship
PWR Special: Homecoming	October 12, 2019	ABS-CBN Vertis Tent	Quezon City	TJP vs. Jake de Leon
Vendetta	November 24, 2019	Power Mac Center Spotlight	Makati	Team Philippines vs Team Malaysia in an Ubusan ng Lahi match

==== 2020 ====
Event	Date	Venue	Location	Main event
Mabuhay ang Wrestling	January 26, 2020	Power Mac Center Spotlight	Makati	Chris Panzer (c) vs. Quatro vs. Ken Warren in a triple threat match for the PWR Championship
Wrestle For Taal (house show)	February 5, 2020	Power Mac Center Spotlight	Makati	Crystal (c) vs. Jake De Leon for the MYPW Wrestlecon Championship
Love at First Fight	February 23, 2020	Power Mac Center Spotlight	Makati	Chris Panzer (c) vs. Robbie Eagles for the PWR Championship

== Championships and accomplishments ==
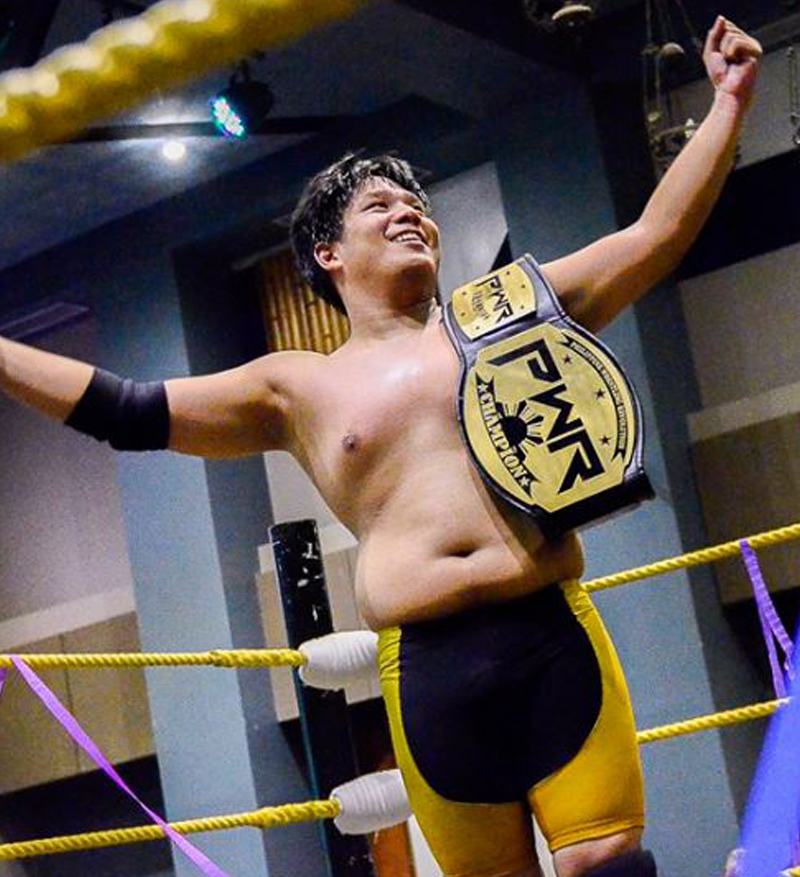
"The Senyorito" Jake de Leon

Championship	Final champion(s)	Reign	Date won	Days held	Notes
PWR Championship	Vacant	-	July 31, 2020	-	The title was declared vacant after Chris Panzer announced his departure from PWR.
PHX Championship	Vlad Sinnsyk	1	November 24, 2019	1025	Defeated Chino Guinto in an open challenge at Vendetta
PWR Tag Team Championship	Vacant	-	July 31, 2020	-	The title was declared vacant after MSG (Main Maxx and SANDATA) announced their departure from PWR.
All Out War Championship	Jan Evander	1	November 24, 2019	1025	Defeated Martivo at Vendetta

=== PWR Championship ===
In May 2017, the PWR Championship was established to be called as "Kampeon ng Pilipinas"

Key
No.	Overall reign number
Reign	Reign number for the specific champion
Days	Number of days held

No.	Champion	Championship change			Reign statistics		Notes	Ref.
No.	Champion	Date	Event	Location	Reign	Days	Notes	Ref.
1	Jake de Leon	May 23, 2015	Wrevolution X	Makati	1	<1	Defeated Bombay Suarez to become the inaugural champion.	
2	Bryan Leo	May 23, 2015	Wrevolution X	Makati	1	210	Used the opportunity that Mr. Sy gave to Bryan Leo on the same night, after defeating Mayhem Brannigan.	
3	Ralph Imabayashi	December 19, 2015	Terminus	Makati	1	63		
4	Bryan Leo	February 20, 2016	Vendetta	Makati	2	98		
5	Jake de Leon	May 28, 2016	Wrevolution X	Makati	2	169	This was a triple threat match also including Ralph Imabayashi.	
6	John Sebastian	November 13, 2016	PWR Live: Suplex Sunday	Pasig	1	168	Defeated Jake de Leon in a Bacolod Bullrope Match.	
7	Chris Panzer	April 30, 2017	Wrevolution X	Pasig	1	84		
8	Billy Suede	July 23, 2017	PWR Live: Bakbakan sa Bayanihan	Pasig	1	42		
9	Chris Panzer	September 3, 2017	PWR Live: Sugod!	Makati	2	140	Defeated Billy Suede and Ralph Imabayashi in a 3-Way Match	
10	Ralph Imabayashi	January 21, 2018	PWR Live: Kingdom Come	Makati	2	490	Rederick Mahaba served as special guest referee.	
11	Quatro	May 26, 2019	Wrevolution X	Makati	1	139	Defeated Ralph Imabayashi in a 2 out of 3 Falls Match	
12	Chris Panzer	October 12, 2019	PWR Special: Homecoming	Quezon City	3	293	Defeated Quatro and Jeff Cobb in a 3-Way Match.	
—	Vacated	July 31, 2020	n/a	n/a	—	—	The title was declared vacant after Chris Panzer announced his departure from PWR.	
—	Deactivated	September 14, 2022	n/a	n/a	—	—	PWR closed on September 14, 2022, and rebranded as Filipino Pro Wrestling (FPW).	

==== Combined reigns ====
Rank	Wrestler	No. of reigns	Combined days
1	Ralph Imabayashi	2	553
2	Chris Panzer	3	517
3	Bryan Leo	2	308
4	Jake de Leon	2	169
5	John Sebastian	1	168
6	Quatro	1	139
7	Billy Suede	1	42

=== Philippine Excellence (PHX) Championship ===
The title had been known as the Philippine Hybrid X Championship until June 2018.

Key
No.	Overall reign number
Reign	Reign number for the specific champion
Days	Number of days held

No.	Champion	Championship change			Reign statistics		Notes	Ref.
No.	Champion	Date	Event	Location	Reign	Days	Notes	Ref.
1	Ken Warren	September 26, 2015	Renaissance	Makati	1	161	Defeated Ralph Imabayashi in the tournament final to become the inaugural champion.	
2	Bombay Suarez	March 5, 2016	PWR Live: Manila Madness	Manila	1	49	Defeated Chris Panzer and Ken Warren in a three-way match.	
3	Main Maxx	April 23, 2016	PWR Live: Road to Wrevolution X	Parañaque	1	281	Defeated Bombay Suarez and Ken Warren in a three-way match.	
4	Peter Versoza	January 29, 2017	PWR Live: Bagong Yugto	Pasig	1	91		
5	Chino Guinto	April 30, 2017	Wrevolution X	Pasig	1	84	Defeated Peter Versoza, Ralph Imabayashi and SANDATA in a Fatal Four-way Match.	
—	Vacated	July 23, 2017	PWR Live: Bakbakan sa Bayanihan	Pasig	—	—	Chino Guinto vacated the championship due to a knee injury.	
6	Mike Madrigal	August 27, 2017	PWR at APCC 2017, Day 3	Pasig	1	266	Defeated SANDATA and Dax Xaviera in a triple threat tournament final.	
7	Ken Warren	May 20, 2018	Wrevolution X	Makati	2	98	Title renamed the Philippine Excellence Championship at PWR Live: Re5peto on June 24, 2018.	
8	Jake de Leon	August 26, 2018	Renaissance	Makati	1	91		
9	John Sebastian	November 25, 2018	Vendetta	Makati	1	182	Defeated Jake De Leon, Ken Warren, Chris Panzer, Crystal and Andrew Tang in a Six Pack Challenge.	
10	Chino Guinto	May 26, 2019	Wrevolution X	Makati	2	182	Defeated John Sebastian and Vlad Sinnsyk in a Three-Way Match.	
11	Vlad Sinnsyk	November 24, 2019	Vendetta	Makati	1	1,025	Defeated Chino Guinto in a PHX Open Challenge via referee stoppage after multiple Muscle Busters.	
—	Deactivated	September 14, 2022	n/a	n/a	—	—	PWR closed on September 14, 2022, and rebranded as Filipino Pro Wrestling (FPW).	

==== Combined reigns ====
As of May 13, 2026.

†	Indicates the current champion

Rank	Wrestler	No. of reigns	Combined days
1	Vlad Sinnsyk	1	1,025
2	Main Maxx	1	281
3	Chino Guinto	2	266
3	Mike Madrigal	1	266
5	Ken Warren	2	259
6	John Sebastian	1	182
7	Jake de Leon	1	91
7	Peter Versoza	1	91
9	Bombay Suarez	1	49

=== PWR Tag Team Championship ===
Key
No.	Overall reign number
Reign	Reign number for the specific team—reign numbers for the individuals are in parentheses, if different
Days	Number of days held

No.	Champion	Championship change			Reign statistics		Notes	Ref.
No.	Champion	Date	Event	Location	Reign	Days	Notes	Ref.
1	The YOLO Twins (Yohann Ollores and Logan Ollores)	April 30, 2017	Wrevolution X	Pasig	1	118	Defeated Deadly Sinns and Fighters 4 Hire to become the inaugural champion.	
2	The Network (James "Idol" Martinez and Alexander Belmonte III)	August 26, 2017	PWR at APCC 2017, Day 2	Pasay	1	197		
3	John Sebastian and Crystal	March 11, 2018	Path of Gold	Makati	1	168	Defeated Alexander Belmonte III and Zayden Trudeau & Bolt in a triple threat match. Belmonte defended the belt alone.	
4	The Naughty Boys (Evan Carleaux and Trian Dela Torre)	August 26, 2018	Renaissance	Makati	1	203		
5	The YOLO Twins (Yohann Ollores and Logan Ollores)	March 17, 2019	Path of Gold	Makati	2	70		
6	The KaKaiBr0s (Mh4rckie and Kh3ndrick)	May 26, 2019	Wrevolution X	Makati	1	245	Defeated The YOLO Twins and The Naughty Boys in a triple threat match.	
7	MSG (Main Maxx and SANDATA)	January 26, 2020	Mabuhay ang Wrestling	Makati	1	187	Mr. Sy served as special guest referee.	
—	Vacated	July 31, 2020	n/a	n/a	—	—	The title was declared vacant after MSG (Main Maxx, SANDATA, Chris Panzer and manager Mr. Sy) announced their departure from PWR.	
—	Deactivated	September 14, 2022	n/a	n/a	—	—	PWR closed on September 14, 2022, and rebranded as Filipino Pro Wrestling (FPW).	

==== Combined reigns ====
Rank	Tag Team	No. of reigns	Combined days
1	KaKaiBr0s (Mh4rckie & Kh3ndrick)	1	245
2	The Naughty Boys (Evan Carleaux & Trian Dela Torre)	1	203
3	The Network (James "Idol" Martinez & Alexander Belmonte III)	1	197
4	The YOLO Twins (Yohann Ollores & Logan Ollores)	2	188
5	MSG (Main Maxx & SANDATA)	1	187
6	John Sebastian & Crystal	1	168

=== All Out War Championship ===
All defenses of the All Out War Championship are done under All Out War Match rules. Similar to the WWE Hardcore Championship.

Key
No.	Overall reign number
Reign	Reign number for the specific champion
Days	Number of days held

No.	Champion	Championship change			Reign statistics		Notes	Ref.
No.	Champion	Date	Event	Location	Reign	Days	Notes	Ref.
1	The Apocalypse	July 23, 2017	PWR Live: Bakbakan sa Bayanihan	Pasig	1	105	Awarded the title after winning another All Out War Match.	
2	Vlad Sinnsyk	November 5, 2017	Vendetta	Makati	1	196		
3	Alexander Belmonte III	May 20, 2018	Wrevolution X	Makati	1	189	Defeated Vlad Sinnsyk, Vintendo, James "Idol" Martinez, Peter Versoza and Revo-Ranger in a 6-Man All Out War Match.	
4	Dax Xaviera	November 25, 2018	Vendetta	Makati	1	154		
5	Martivo	April 28, 2019	PWR Live: Destino	Makati	1	210	During this reign, the belt was called the "All Out WARla" Championship.	
6	Jan Evander	November 24, 2019	Vendetta	Makati	1	1,025		
—	Deactivated	September 14, 2022	n/a	n/a	—	—	PWR closed on September 14, 2022, and rebranded as Filipino Pro Wrestling (FPW).	

==== Combined reigns ====
Rank	Wrestler	No. of reigns	Combined days
1	Jan Evander, PwD	1	1,025
2	Martivo	1	210
3	Vlad Sinnsyk	1	196
4	Alexander Belmonte III	1	189
5	Dax Xaviera	1	154
6	The Apocalypse	1	105

=== Path of Gold ===
Winners	Date won	Event	Last eliminated	Champion Challenged	Event of Cash-in	Result
Jake De Leon	December 19, 2015	Terminus (2015)	Peter Versoza	PWR Champion Ralph Imabayashi	Wrevolution X (2016)	De Leon won
Chris Panzer	February 26, 2017	Path of Gold (2017)	Ralph Imabayashi	PWR Champion John Sebastian	Wrevolution X (2017)	Panzer won
Ken Warren	March 11, 2018	Path of Gold (2018)	Jake De Leon	PHX Champion Mike Madrigal	Wrevolution X (2018)	Warren won
Quatro	March 17, 2019	Path of Gold (2019)	Mike Madrigal	PWR Champion Ralph Imabayashi	Wrevolution X (2019)	Quatro won
N/A	N/A	Path of Gold (2020)	N/A	N/A	N/A	Event cancelled

== Roster ==
=== Male wrestlers ===
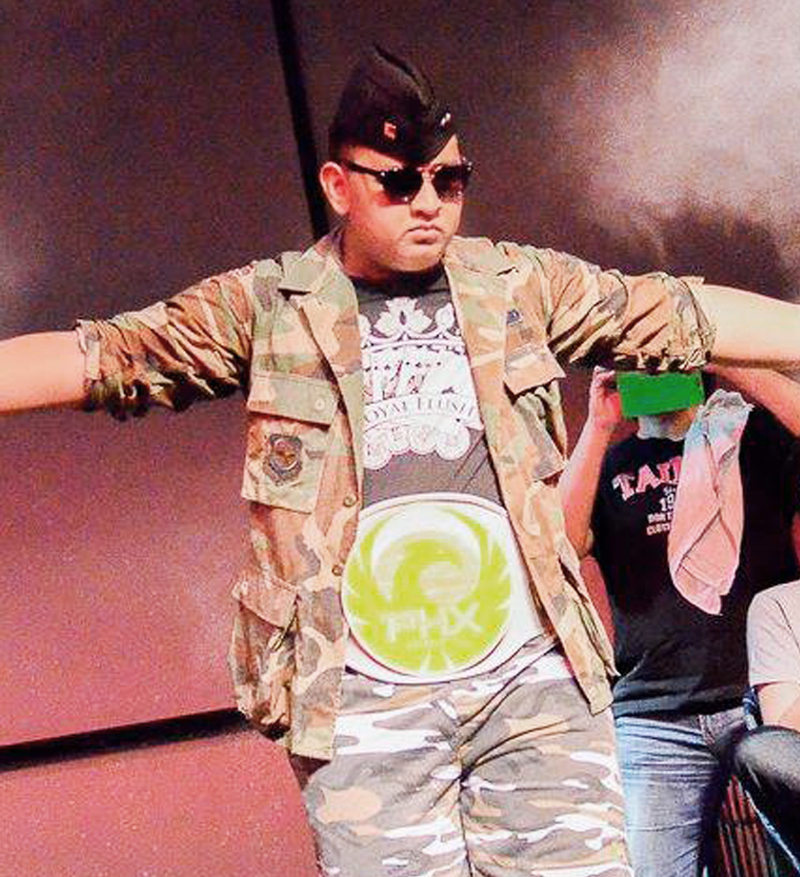
"The Perfect 10" Main Maxx

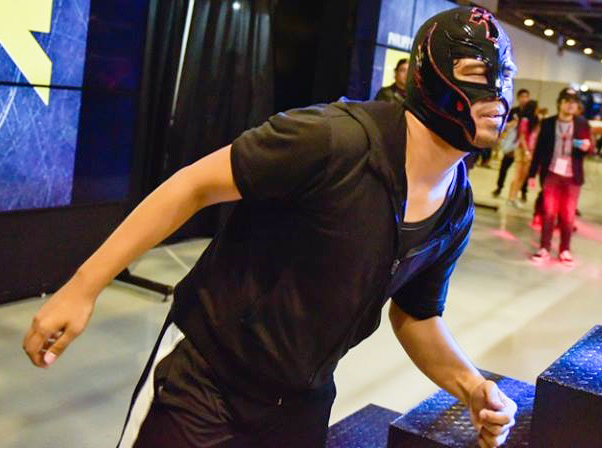
Trabajador Maximo

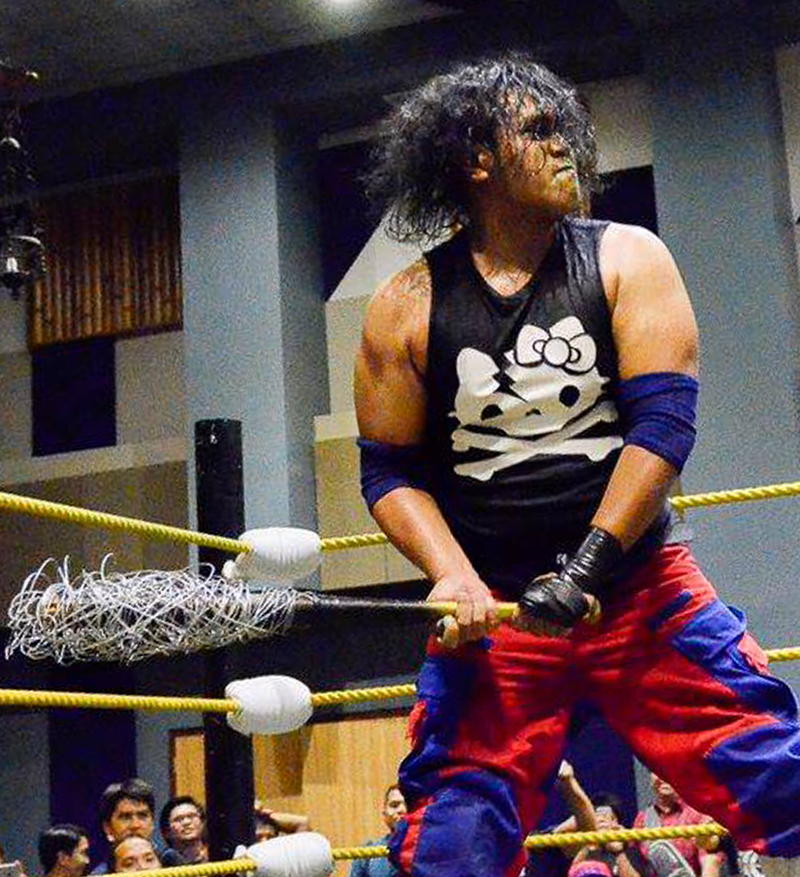
Bombay Suarez

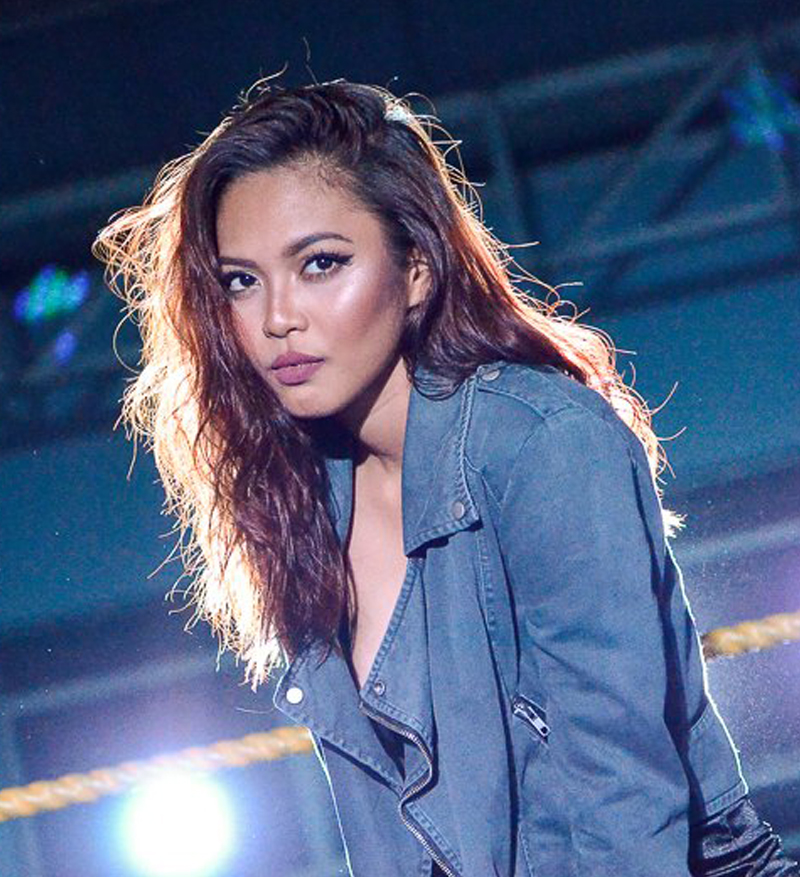
Crystal

Ring Name	Notes
Alexander Belmonte III	"The Warlord", formerly "Mr. Financially Stable"; member of The Endgame;
The Apocalypse	
Bolt	"The Animazing Fighter"
Bombay Suarez	"The Bitch Killer"; former head trainer;
Brad Cruz	"The Manila Bae"
Cali Nueva	"The Renaissance Man"; member of The Naughty Boys
Chino Guinto	"The Golden Boy", member of The Network
Dax Xaviera	"Ang May-Ari ng Pinakamalupit na Slingblade sa Pilipinas"; tag team with Gatilyo
Evan Carleaux	"The Future of PWR", member of The Naughty Boys
Gatilyo	"Ang Armas ng Karahasan"
GrabCamus	"Mr. Ubusan ng Lahi", member of The Naughty Boys
IMABAYASHI	"The Wrestler of Shinjuku"; one-half of MTNH
James "Idol" Martinez	"Playtime"; Leader of The Network
Jan Evander, Pw.D.	"The Pro-Wrestling Doctor", Leader of The Endgame, PWR All Out War Champion
Kapitan Juan Tutan	Suspended for the next eight (8) PWR Events as of July 2020
Kapitan PWR
Kh3ndrick	"Pfeymusz.0ne", "D biq dawq", one-half of The KaKaiBr0s
Logan Ollores	One-half of The YOLO Twins
Martivo	"The Man-Doll"; one-half of The Punk Dolls
Mh4rkie	"PitmaL0rd", one-half of The KaKaiBr0s
Mike Madrigal	"The Walking Death"
Quatro	"The Lightbringer", formerly "Trabajador Quatro"
Rederick Mahaba	"The King of Schlong Style"; one-half of MTNH
Revo Ranger	
Sam Baltazar	Baguio City Bad Boy; member of The Network
SUPER Vintendø	"The Final Boss", member of The Endgame
Trian Dela Torre	Self-proclaimed "Midget Wrestling Federation Champion", Leader of The Naughty Boys
Vlad Sinnsyk	"The Hand of Judgment", PHX Champion
Yohann Ollores	One-half of The YOLO Twins
Zayden Trudeau	"The Canadian Dragon"

=== Female wrestlers ===
Ring Name	Notes
Boyet	Yet to Debut
Crystal	First woman to ever compete in an official PWR match.
Jaye Sera	
Jhemherlhynn	"Ang Star ng PWR", member of The Naughty Boys
Nina	
Robynn	First woman to wrestle for the PWR Tag Team Championship

=== Other personnel ===
Name	Notes
Red Ollero	PWR President
Lynch Imbat	PWR Vice President
Tim Ng	PWR Executive Director
Brian Lumanog	RIng Announcer; PWR Aftershock Host
Pasas Castro	PWR Aftershock Host
Pocholo Estrada	Occasional Ring Announcer; PWR General Manager
Matt Roxas	Senior Referee
Paulo Agudelo	Referee
Ben Vitacion	Referee (inactive)
Romeo Moran	Referee
Rommel Garcia	Referee
Jayce Chua	Referee
Joey Bax	Referee
Leynard Quizon	Referee
Matt del Rosario	Media
Maow del Rosario	Media
Chai Abundo	Media
Gabs Marty	Head Young Boy

== Alumni ==
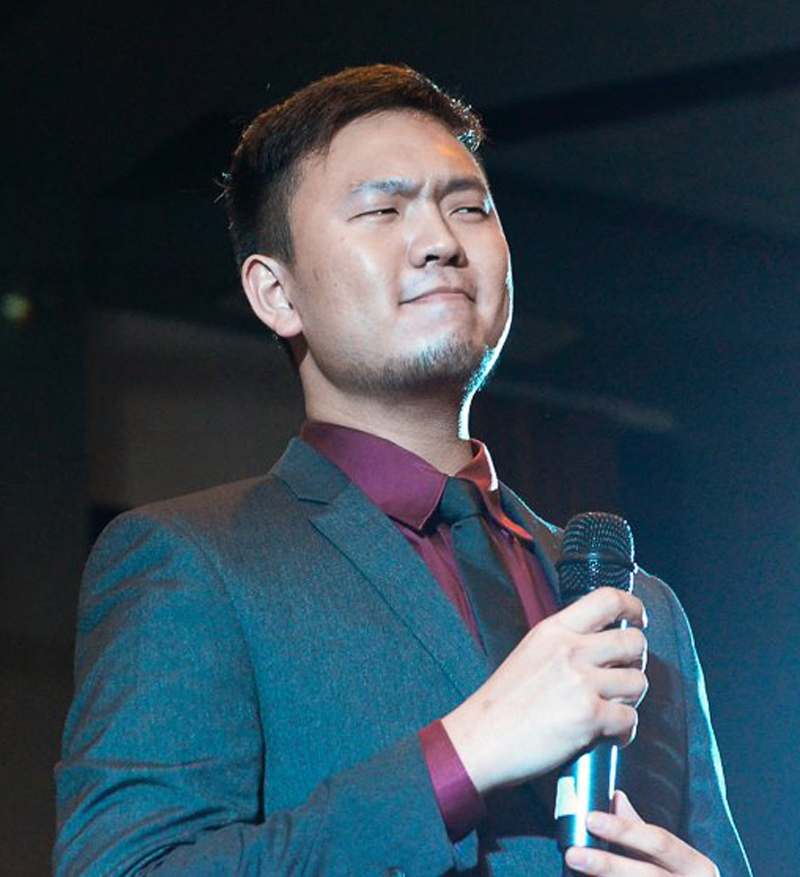
Mr. Sy

- Barry Navarro
- "Beautiful" Billy Suede
- Blackzilla
- "Big Bank” Bruno Bernardo
- ”Classical” Bryan Leo
- Chris Panzer
- The Council of Trabajadores (Uno, Dos, Tres, Maximo & Supremo)
- Dan Ericson
- Draven Sloane
- Epitaph
- "Mr. Philippine Wrestling" Jake De Leon
- John Sebastian
- Kanto Terror
- Keivan Skull
- Ken Warren
- Lucas Hunter
- Main Maxx
- Mayhem Brannigan
- Mark D. Manalo
- McKata
- Miguel Rosales
- Mike Shannon
- Mike Vargas
- Mr. Sy
- Mr. William Melvin
- "The Machine" Mavericc Knight
- THE Nelson Borman Jr.
- Peter Versoza
- Robin Sane
- Samoan Papa
- SANDATA
- Scarlett

== Visiting international wrestlers ==
Name	Notes
Alexis Lee	Appeared in 2019
Andreuw Tang	Appeared in 2018; returned in 2019
Andrew Carter	Member of The Foundation, appeared in 2019
Aysha	Appeared in 2018
”Beautiful“ Billy Suede	6th PWR Champion, appeared in 2017, returned in 2019
Blackzilla	Appeared in 2017
“El Guapo” Carlos Zamora	Appeared in 2019
Chris Target	Member of The Foundation, appeared in 2019
Desi Derata	Appeared in 2019
DJ Nira	Appeared in 2019
Dr. Gore	Appeared in 2018
Dr. Hertz	Member of The Regime, appeared in 2017
Draven Sloane	Appeared in 2014
Emi Sakura	Appeared in 2019
Emman “The Kid” Noorazman	Appeared in 2018
Eric Walker	Appeared in 2019
Jeff Cobb	Appeared in 2019
Jibzy	Appeared in 2019
Julio Garcia	Member of The Foundation, appeared in 2019
Killah	Member of The Foundation, appeared in 2019
Koto Hiro	Appeared in 2017-2018
The Ladykiller	Appeared in 2018
Marco Garcia	Member of The Foundation, appeared in 2019
Masa Takanashi	Appeared in 2019
Nor 'Phoenix' Diana	Appeared in 2019
Robbie Eagles	Appeared in 2020
Riho	Appeared in 2019
Shaukat	Appeared in 2019
T-Hawk	Appeared in 2019
TJP (TJ Perkins)	Former WWE Cruiserweight Champion, winner of the 2016 Cruiserweight Classic, appeared in 2019
Tengu	Member of The Regime, appeared in 2017-2018
Trexxus	Appeared in 2019

== PWR Boot Camp ==
The promotion has posted various campaigns on most social media platforms for pro-wrestling training on both males and females ages 18 and above for their scheduled boot camp.
