= Asia Pop Comic Convention =

Annual comic book fan convention in Metro Manila, Philippines

Coordinates: 32°42′22.60″N 117°09′42.63″W

AsiaPOP Comic Convention
- AsiaPOP Comic Convention logo
- Status: Inactive
- Genre: Multigenre
- Venue: SMX Convention Center (main); Metro Manila (various)
- Location: Metro Manila
- Country: Philippines
- Inaugurated: September 2015
- Most recent: July 2018
- Organizer: Universal Events & Entertainment
- Website: asiapopcomicon.com/manila/

AsiaPOP Comic Convention, also known as AsiaPOP Comicon, or simply APCC, was an annual comic book fan convention held in Metro Manila, Philippines. APCC featured international brands in the fields of comics, toys, animation, film, television and music within the pop culture phenomena, later including a larger range of pop culture and entertainment elements across virtually all genres, such as video games, books and sports. APCC was the largest pop culture convention in the Philippines during its run.

APCC was organized by Universal Events & Entertainment, a subsidiary of the Al Ahli Holding Group. The inaugural Asia Pop Comic Convention was held from September 17 to 20 at the World Trade Center Metro Manila in Pasay, with subsequent events held between 2016 to 2018. Universal Events & Entertainment later cancelled the 2019 convention due to various factors involving management and scheduling, and has not held an event in the country since.

== Events ==
APCC featured a large floor-space for exhibitors. These include media companies such as movie studios and TV networks, as well as comic-book dealers and collectibles merchants. Also included are autograph areas like the Walk of Fame where invited guest can sign autographs and sell or do free sketches. There are areas for sales of merchandises from clothing, toys, gadgets and other souvenirs. Creative Circle (used to be known as Artists' Alley) is for budding or independent artist and talents to sell their works to the public and also serve as a platform to showcase their talents to potential companies. APCC also offers panels, seminars and workshops with comic book professionals. Meet and greet panels are also available for different celebrity guests.

Since its inauguration, Cosplay Authority Global Challenge, or CAGE conducts cosplay competitions. There are also musical performances conducted by various artists. Different stage shows are also conducted ranging from local workshops, conferences, concerts and even wrestling shows. There are previews of upcoming feature films, and portfolio review sessions with top comic book and video game companies. In 2016, Marvel introduced its own panel, Hall M. In the same year, eSports have been introduced to the event. The following year Netflix hosted its own panel which evolved into Hall N. Disney followed suit introducing Hall D in 2018.

== History ==
=== 2015 ===
The inaugural Asia Pop Comic Convention was held from September 17 to 20 at the World Trade Center Metro Manila in Pasay with various big names cosplayers, artists and other entertainers both local and international were featured. Paul Bettany, who portrays the Vision in the Marvel Cinematic Universe, showcased a Civil War Panel to promote the next installment in the Marvel Cinematic Universe. Nathalie Emmanuel who plays Missandei of Game of Thrones also made an appearance. Colton Haynes, who plays Roy Harper in the series Arrow, also appeared. Jeremy Shada, the voice actor of Finn the Human in Adventure Time, was also present with a performance with his band Make Out Monday. The convention also hosted the inaugural Cosplay Authority Global Challenge (CAGE).

Also present were local comic book artists such as Steven Segovia, Mark Torres, Mico Suayan, and Carlo Pagulayan whose work span several renowned comic book companies, such as Dark Horse, Marvel, and DC. Renowned cosplayers such as Riddle (Riki LeCotey), Alodia Gosiengfiao, and Vampy Bit Me (Linda Le) were part of the festivities. Other attendees were Pop culture industry icons such as YouTube personalities Octopimp and Commander Holly (Holly Conrad), props and costume designer Bill Doran, and several others. Over 29,000 attendees were reported.

=== 2016 ===
The 2016 convention was held from August 26 through 28 at the SMX Convention Center in Pasay. English actor Nicholas Hoult who is known for portraying a young Beast in the X-Men and Nux in the critically acclaimed film Mad Max: Fury Road appeared as one of the celebrity guests. Actress Millie Bobby Brown, who is known for her roles as Eleven in Stranger Things and young Alice in Once Upon a Time, also attended the convention.

Actresses Holland Roden and Hayley Atwell initially confirmed their attendance in the convention, but later dropped out due to scheduling conflicts. Both of them were replaced by Australian actress Claire Holt, best known for her role in The Vampire Diaries and The Originals. English actor Joe Dempsie, known for his roles of Chris Miles on the teen comedy-drama series Skins and Gendry on Game of Thrones, attended the convention.

Marvel Comics writer C. B. Cebulski hosted Hall M, which showcased never before seen footage for the upcoming Luke Cage television series and the next installment in the MCU Doctor Strange. The Philippine Wrestling Revolution held full shows. The Philippine eSports Organization (PeSO) hosted eSports competitions as part of APCC. The second edition of CAGE returned.

APCC Manila 2016 was also attended by various guests personalities and global cosplayers such as: J-Rock singer Hiroshi Kitadani from the anime music supergroup JAM Project, comic book illustrators Mike Zeck, Ken Lashley, Billy Tan, and Jason Palmer, as well as global cosplayers, Ani Mia, Lindze Merritt, Riki LeCotey, and Yugana Senshi Uon. They are joined by artist Simone Legno of tokidoki and representing Filipino artistry were cosplayers Alodia Gosiengfiao and Myrtle Sarrosa; beauty vlogger Say Tioco and artist extraordinaire Whilce Portacio, also known as the creator of Bishop of Uncanny X-Men. Over 40,000 people attended the event.

=== 2017 ===
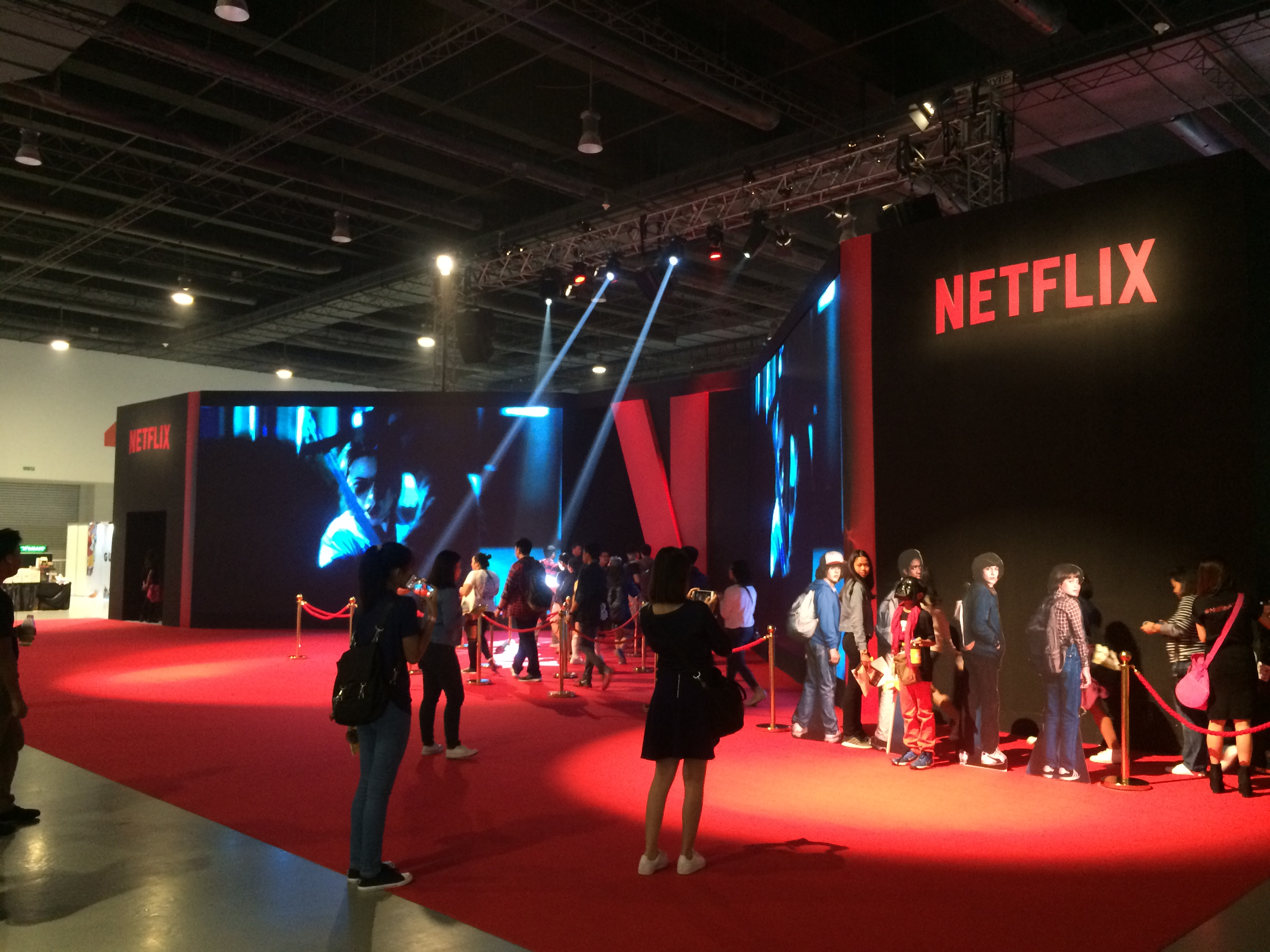
Booth of Netflix during APCC 2017

The 2017 convention took place on August 25 to 27 at SMX Convention Center, Pasay. Marvel once again hosted Hall M which featured never before scenes from upcoming video games, television series and movies such as Thor: Ragnarok and Ant-Man and the Wasp. Netflix brought some of its Stranger Things' cast, namely Joe Keery and Noah Schnapp, who play Steve Harrington and Will Byers, and season two newcomers Dacre Montgomery, who plays Billy and Sadie Sink who plays Max. Ray Fisher who plays Cyborg in the DC Extended Universe, and Tyler Hoechlin, who is known for his roles as Derek Hale in Teen Wolf and Superman in Supergirl were the major celebrity guests. Japanese idol Serena Kozuki, also known as “Live Monster”, was one of the guest entertainers. Voice actor Gaku Space known for his role as Genji of the critically acclaimed Overwatch video game was also present. The Cosplay Authority Global Challenge returned for the a third edition with notable cosplayers namely Alodia Gosiengfiao, Myrtle Sarrosa, Pion Kim, Jinbehindinfinity, Philip Odango, and Haiden Hazard serving as judges.

Various comic and graphic artists such as Carl Potts, veteran penciler/inker Rodney Ramos, Whilce Portacio and Shoji Kawamori, the renowned creator of the Macross anime franchise also graced the event with their presence. The Philippine Wrestling Revolution conducted house shows for the second time. Toy designers like Tokidoki co-founder Simone Legno; Jason Freeny, whom is known for his anatomical toy sculptures; and Quiccs, an illustrator, toy designer, and graffiti artist known for his love for Japanese robot culture where in attendance. APCC reported over 60,000 attendees.

=== 2018 ===
The fourth installment of APCC was held on July 27–29, 2018 at SMX Convention Center, Pasay, Manila. Celebrity guests include Finn Jones (known for his role as the titular character in Netflix's Iron Fist), Tye Sheridan (who plays the lead in Ready Player One and Cyclops in X-Men: Apocalypse) and Osric Chau (who portrays Kevin Tran on Supernatural) Jessica Henwick was initially announced as one of the guests celebrity but cancelled citing unforeseen circumstances.

Marvel Vice-president of Creative Development Stephen Wacker hosted Hall M which presented clip from an upcoming episode of Cloak and Dagger. Disney Studios introduced Hall D featuring sessions from Disney artist Mark Henn. The hall also featured the internationally renowned furniture designer Kenneth Cobonpue and the unveiling of his works on Star Wars themed furniture collections. The Netflix panel (reintroduced as Hall N) returned which featured special screenings and previews of future releases such as Castlevania and Godzilla: Planet of the Monsters. The showcase also included appearances from Luke Cage (along with Jones) star Mike Colter, showrunner Cheo Hodari Coker, Mustafa Shakir, who plays the villain Bushmaster, and Iron Fist producer Raven Metzner.

Convention regulars, Brian Mur, Stanley Lau, Simone Legno, Alex Sinclaire, Lan Medina, Mike McKone, Phil Noto, and Whilce Portacio made their appearances along with newcomers Artists Amanda Visell and Michelle Valigura. Professional cosplayers, Canvas Cosplay (Philip Odango), Leon Chiro, Vera Chimera and Yugana Senshiuon served as judges for the CAGE. ONE FC Heavyweight Champion Brandon Vera also served as a judge.

The convention was noted for the introduction of the Jollibee Funko Pop.

=== 2019 ===
The fifth installment was supposed to take place on August 2–4, 2019, but was postponed to 2020 citing scheduling conflicts with its partners.

== Locations and dates ==
No.	Dates	Location	Attendance	Major Official Comic-Con Celebrity Guests	Notes
1	Sept 17–20, 2015	World Trade Center Metro Manila, Pasay	29,000	Paul Bettany, Colton Haynes, Nathalie Emmanuel	Inaugural. Jason Momoa initially confirmed his attendance but later dropped out due to scheduling conflicts.
2	Aug 26–28, 2016	SMX Convention Center, Pasay	40,000	Nicholas Hoult, Millie Bobby Brown, Claire Holt, Joe Dempsie	Holland Roden and Hayley Atwell initially confirmed their attendance, but later dropped out due to scheduling conflicts.
3	Aug 25–27, 2017	SMX Convention Center, Pasay	60,000	Ray Fisher, Tyler Hoechlin, Joe Keery, Noah Schnapp, Sadie Sink, Dacre Montgomery	Keery, Schnapp, Sink and Montgomery were the celebrity guests from the Netflix Panel
4	July 27–29, 2018	SMX Convention Center, Pasay	-	Finn Jones, Tye Sheridan, Osric Chau, Mike Colter, Mustafa Shakir	Colter, Shakir and Jones were the celebrity guests from the Netflix Panel. Jessica Henwick initially confirmed her attendance but later dropped citing unforeseen circumstances
