= Kicking Cars =

EP by Make Out Monday
- Released: November 16, 2014
- Recorded: 2014
- Length: 16:50
- Label: Independent
- Producer: Zack Odom; Kenneth Mount

Singles from Kicking Cars
- 1. "Hope Less Romantics" Released: July 14, 2014; 2. "Sirens" Released: November 3, 2014; 3. "Twixter" Released: February 16, 2015

Kicking Cars is the debut extended play by American pop punk band Make Out Monday. It was released on November 16, 2014, through the band's official website and on iTunes. A special edition was then released first at Asia POP Comicon in Manila on September 19, 2015. It was later made available for online purchase at the official website.

== Singles ==
"Hope Less Romantics" was released as the first single from the EP on July 14, 2014. The music video was released on July 21, 2014. "Sirens" was released as a single on November 3, 2014. On November 5, it was accompanied by an acoustic live version of the song and an announcement of the next single and the EP. "Twixter" was released as the next single, with a music video posted on February 16, 2015.

== Track listing ==
All tracks written by Zack Shada, Jeremy Shada, Logan Charles, John Spicer, and Seth Renken. All tracks are produced by Zack Odom and Kenneth Mount.

| No. | Title | Length |
|---|---|---|
| 1. | "Twixter" | 2:52 |
| 2. | "Sirens" | 3:10 |
| 3. | "Hope Less Romantics" | 3:37 |
| 4. | "Tall as Heaven" | 3:36 |
| 5. | "Little Infinity" | 3:35 |
| Total length: | | 16:50 |

Special edition bonus tracks
| No. | Title | Length |
|---|---|---|
| 6. | "American Cinema" | 3:24 |
| 7. | "Jersey" | 3:47 |
| Total length: | | 22:41 |
