= Julie and the Phantoms (soundtrack) =

Julie and the Phantoms: Music from the Netflix Original Series

Soundtrack album by various artists
- Released: September 11, 2020
- Recorded: 2019
- Genre: Pop rock
- Length: 49:11
- Label: Maisie Music Publishing

Singles from Julie and the Phantoms: Music from the Netflix Original Series
- 1. "Edge of Great" Released: August 28, 2020

Julie and the Phantoms: Music from the Netflix Original Series is the soundtrack album of the American musical comedy-drama web television series Julie and the Phantoms. Both soundtrack and series were released on September 10, 2020. The album reached number 1 on both the US and Australian iTunes charts and peaked at number 4 on the US Billboard Soundtrack chart.

== Background ==
Stars Madison Reyes and Charlie Gillespie wrote one track for the show, "Perfect Harmony" alongside the series' vocal producer Alana Da Fonesca.

== Track listing ==
Julie and the Phantoms: Season 1 (From the Netflix Original Series)
No.	Title	Writer(s)	Artist(s) Julie and the Phantoms Cast	Length
1.	"Now or Never"	Tova Litvin, Doug Rockwell	Charlie Gillespie, Owen Patrick Joyner, Jeremy Shada	3:04
2.	"Wake Up"	Anne Preven	Madison Reyes	3:37
3.	"This Band is Back (Reggie's Jam)"	Doug Davis, Anthony Maribella, Susan Paroff, James Petrie, Jodie Shihadeh, Nikki Sorrentino, Ali Theodore	Gillespie, Patrick Joyner, Shada	3:12
4.	"Wow"	Litvin, Rockwell	Savannah Lee May	1:40
5.	"Bright"	David Amber, Erin Bowman	Reyes, Gillespie, Patrick Joyner, Shada	3:10
6.	"Flying Solo"	Jillian Allen, Jolene Belle, Joachim Svare	Reyes, Gillespie, Patrick Joyner, Shada	3:04
7.	"I Got the Music"	Hannah Asres Jones, Jack Kugell, Matt Wong	Reyes and Jadah Marie	3:47
8.	"The Other Side of Hollywood"	Litvin, Rockwell	Cheyenne Jackson	3:20
9.	"All Eyes On Me"	Jones, Kugell, Wong	May	3:42
10.	"Finally Free"	Davis, Maribella, Paroff, Petrie, Shihadeh, Sorrentino, Theodore	Reyes, Gillespie, Patrick Joyner, Shada	3:01
11.	"Perfect Harmony"	Alana Da Fonseca, Gillespie, Reyes	Reyes, Gillespie	3:24
12.	"Edge of Great"	Amber, Andy Love	Reyes, Gillespie, Patrick Joyner, Shada	3:01
13.	"Unsaid Emily"	Michelle Lewis, Dan Petty	Gillespie	3:50
14.	"You Got Nothing to Lose"	Vincent Alfieri, Da Fonesca	Jackson	3:04
15.	"Stand Tall"	Jakub Vanyo	Reyes, Gillespie, Patrick Joyner, Shada	3:33
Total length:				49:11

== Charts ==
Chart performance of Julie and the Phantoms: Music from the Netflix Original Series
Chart (2020)	Peak position
Australian Albums (ARIA)	35
Austrian Albums (Ö3 Austria)	66
Belgian Albums (Ultratop Flanders)	47
Belgian Albums (Ultratop Wallonia)	186
Dutch Albums (Album Top 100)	57
French Albums (SNEP)	182
New Zealand Albums (RMNZ)	36
Swiss Albums (Schweizer Hitparade)	78
UK Album Downloads (Official Charts)	23
UK Soundtrack Albums (Official Charts)	13
US Billboard 200	163
US Soundtrack Albums (Billboard)	4

== Certifications ==
Certifications for Julie and the Phantoms: Music from the Netflix Original Series
Region	Certification	Certified units/sales
United Kingdom (BPI)	Silver	60,000^{‡}
^{‡} Sales+streaming figures based on certification alone.
