= Madison Reyes =

American-Puerto Rican actress and singer

- Born: June 25, 2004 (age 22); Brooklyn, New York, US
- Occupations: Actress, singer
- Years active: 2020–present
- Partner: Shaun Scudder (m. 2026)
- Children: 1

Madison Reyes (born June 25, 2004) is an American actress and singer, who is known for playing the character Julie Molina in the Netflix musical series Julie and the Phantoms (2020), for which she won an MTV Award and received a nomination for a Daytime Emmy Award.

== Life and career ==
Reyes was born to Puerto Rican parents in Brooklyn, New York, where she was raised. She moved to Allentown, Pennsylvania at age 10.

In 2020, she made her on-screen debut as Julie Molina in the Netflix series, Julie and the Phantoms. Scouted by director Kenny Ortega, she was cast at age 16 to portray the main character in the series. Reyes also performs in the series soundtrack, which includes "Perfect Harmony", written and performed with co-star Charlie Gillespie. Reyes and her fellow cast members won an MTV Movie Award for Best Musical Moment. She received a Daytime Emmy Award nomination for Outstanding Younger Performer in a Daytime Fiction Program in 2021.

On July 16, 2021, Reyes released her first song, "Te Amo". Later that year, she paired up with Julie and The Phantoms co-star, Jadah Marie, to make another song called "Main Thing". On June 3, 2022, she released her debut EP, All Kinds of Love.

In 2023, Reyes released another single, "Make It". On May 3rd, 2024, she released her latest single, "Moth".

In July of 2025, Reyes announced her engagement to her partner of two years, Shaun Scudder. In August of that year, she announced that they were expecting their first child. On November 11th, 2025, Reyes gave birth to their son, Maru Reyes Scudder. On September 26, 2026, they officially got married.

== Filmography ==
=== Television ===
Year	Title	Role	Notes
2020	Julie and the Phantoms	Julie Molina	Title role
2022	The Bad Seed Returns	Teenage from the school	TV movie

== Discography ==
=== Extended plays ===
Title	Details
All Kinds of Love	Released: June 3, 2022; Label: Madison Reyes Records; Formats: Digital download, streaming; Track listing: 1. "3"; 2. "Main Thing"; 3. "Te Amo"; 4. "Stars"; 5. "All Kinds of Love"

=== Soundtrack albums ===
Title	Album details	Peak chart positions				
Title	Album details	US Soundtrack	US	UK Soundtrack	Australian Album	NZ Album
Julie and the Phantoms: Music from the Netflix Original Series	Released: September 10, 2020; Label: Maisie Music Publishing; Format: CD, digital download, streaming	4	163	13	35	36

=== Singles ===
Year	Name
2021	"Dreaming of You" (Selena cover)
2021	"Te Amo"
2021	"Main Thing" (with Jadah Marie)
2023	Make It
2024	Moth

== Awards and nominations ==
List of awards and nominations received by Madison Reyes
Year	Association	Category	Nominated work	Result
2021	Tell-Tale TV Awards	Favorite Actress in a Cable or Streaming Comedy Series	Julie and The Phantoms	Won
2021	Golden Tomato Awards	Fan Favorite TV Series 2020	Julie and The Phantoms	Won
2021	MTV Movie & TV Awards	Best Musical Moment (shared with Charlie Gillespie, Owen Joyner and Jeremy Shada)	Julie and The Phantoms	Won
2021	SEC Awards	Best Actress in a Teen Series	Julie and The Phantoms	Nominated
2021	Daytime Emmy Awards	Outstanding Younger Performer in a Daytime Fiction Program	Julie and The Phantoms	Nominated
2021	Imagen Awards	Best Young Actress/Television	Julie and The Phantoms	Won
