= Charlie Gillespie =

Canadian actor and singer (born 1998)

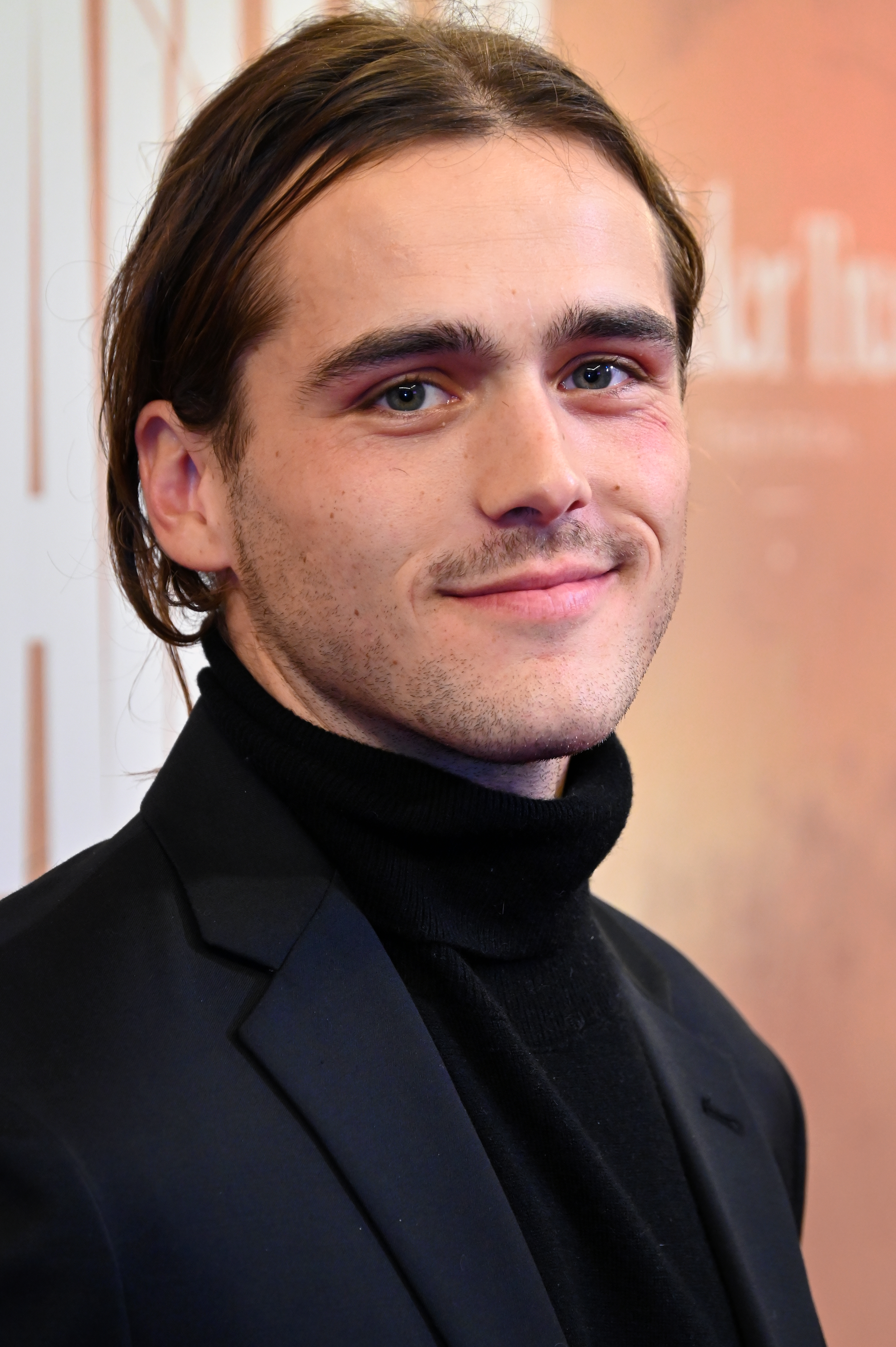
- Gillespie in 2025
- Born: August 26, 1998 (age 28); Moncton, New Brunswick, Canada
- Occupations: Actor, singer
- Years active: 2014–present

Charles Gillespie (born August 26, 1998) is a Canadian actor and singer. He is best known for his role as Luke Patterson in the Netflix series Julie and the Phantoms (2020). In 2027 he will play Troy Barrett in season 2 of the Crave series Heated Rivalry.

== Early life ==
Charles Jeffrey Gillespie was born on August 26, 1998, in Moncton, New Brunswick, Canada. He has three older brothers and a younger sister.

Gillespie began playing music at a young age. He is able to play guitar, bass, trombone, tuba, piano, violin, and saxophone.

== Career ==
In 2014, Gillespie made his film debut in The Outlaw League (Le gang des hors-la-loi). His film and television appearances include Charmed (2018), Degrassi: Next Class (2017), Speed Kills (2018), The Rest of Us (2019), Runt (2020), and Suze (2023).

In 2019, Gillespie was cast in the role of Luke Patterson in the Netflix musical series Julie and the Phantoms, which premiered in 2020. His co-stars included Jeremy Shada, Owen Joyner, and Madison Reyes. With Reyes, he wrote and performed the song "Perfect Harmony".

In 2026, it was announced that Gillespie will join the second season of Crave’s hit show Heated Rivalry as Troy Barrett.

== Filmography ==
=== Film ===
Year	Title	Role	Notes
2014	The Outlaw League (La gang des hors-la-loi)	Tiger	
2018	Speed Kills	Andrew Aronoff	
2019	The Rest of Us	Nathan	
2020	Runt	D-Rat Ronnie	
2021	Love You Anyway	Lucas Parker	
2022	The Class	Jason	
2023	Suze	Gage	
2023	Totally Killer	Teen Blake Hughes	
2023	Deltopia	Jack	
2024	Soul's Road	Chris Carter	
2025	Shattered Ice	Will Mankus	
2025	Splitsville	Jackson	
2025	Sidelined 2: Intercepted	Skyler	
2026	One Night Only	Ezra Strong	
2026	Sidelined 3: End Game	Skyler	
TBA	The Get Back Girl	Alex Boston	

=== Television ===
Year	Title	Role	Notes
2015	Galala	Localhost	Host
2017	Degrassi: Next Class	Oliver	2 episodes
2017	The Next Step	Marcus	Episode: "Oh Brother! Why Art Thou Here?"
2018	2nd Generation	Brody Johnson	6 episodes
2018	Charmed	Brian	2 episodes
2019	Consequénces	Pierre-François Létourneau-Robichaud	6 episodes
2019	I Am the Night	Surfer Hank	Episode: "Pilot"
2020	Julie and the Phantoms	Luke Patterson	Main role
2027	Heated Rivalry †	Troy Barrett	Season 2

== Discography ==
=== Albums ===
Title	Album details	Peak chart positions				
Title	Album details	US Soundtracks	US	UK Soundtracks	Australian Albums	NZ Albums
Julie and the Phantoms: Music from the Netflix Original Series	Released: September 10, 2020; Label: Maisie Music Publishing; Format: CD, digital download, streaming	4	163	13	35	36

== Awards and nominations ==
Year	Association	Category	Nominated work	Result
2017	Joey Awards	Best Leading Actor	2nd Generation	Nominated
2017	Joey Awards	Best Ensemble (with cast)	2nd Generation	Nominated
2021	MTV Movie & TV Awards	Best Musical Moment (shared with Madison Reyes, Owen Joyner and Jeremy Shada)	Julie and the Phantoms	Won
2023	Calgary International Film Festival	Special Jury Citation for Performance, Best Canadian Narrative Film Competition	Suze	Won
