= Megan Charpentier =

Canadian actress (born 2001)

- Born: May 26, 2001 (age 25); New Westminster, British Columbia, Canada
- Occupation: Actress
- Years active: 2004–present

Megan Charpentier (born May 26, 2001) is a Canadian actress, best known for her roles as the Red Queen in Resident Evil: Retribution (2012), as the feral child Victoria in the horror film Mama (2013), Chrystal in Grumpy Cat's Worst Christmas Ever (2014), and for her role as Gretta Keene in It (2017) and the sequel It Chapter Two (2019).

== Early life ==
Charpentier has two younger sisters, Madison and Genea Charpentier. Her parents are Anne and Maurice Charpentier.

== Career ==
Charpentier began her acting career as a three-year-old appearing in a Hasbro commercial after being offered to audition. Charpentier followed this up with more toy commercials, including one for Mattel’s Barbie doll line, and then with several guest appearances and bit parts in TV shows, most notably in Supernatural (2005) as Tess McAnn, a girl who serves as key witness to a case Sam and Dean are investigating. She is often associated with Amanda Seyfried and has played the younger version of the actress' character twice, once in Jennifer's Body (2009) and again in Red Riding Hood (2011). Charpentier appeared in Resident Evil: Retribution (2012) as the Red Queen and in Mama (2013) as Victoria. This started a long-time collaboration with Argentinian filmmaker Andrés Muschietti, and would work with him again in the film It (2017) and its sequel It Chapter Two (2019) as Gretta Keene.

One of Charpentier’s more memorable television roles would be as Chrystal in Grumpy Cat's Worst Christmas Ever (2014), a Holiday special featuring the on-screen debut of internet sensation and meme Grumpy Cat, where the titular cat, pessimistic and cynical, forms an unlikely bond with the optimistic and cheery Chrystal.

She was nominated for Best Newcomer at the UBCP/ACTRA Awards for her role in Mama.

== Filmography ==
=== Film ===
Year	Title	Role	Notes
2009	Jennifer's Body	Young Needy	
2010	Kid's Court	Lawyer Annie	Short Film
2010	Frankie & Alice	Young Paige	
2011	Red Riding Hood	Young Valerie	
2012	Resident Evil: Retribution	Red Queen	
2013	The Old Woman in the Woods	Older Sister	Short Film
2013	Mama	Victoria	
2012	Never Ever	Melanie	Short Film
2014	The Games Maker	Anunciacion	
2014	Rattlesnake	The Little Girl	Short Film
2014	Pinocchio Project	Brittany Anderson	
2017	The Shack	Kate Phillips	
2017	It	Gretta Keene	
2017	The Cannon	Izzy	
2017	The Philosophy of Phil	Molly McGuire	
2018	Violentia	Brittany Anderson	
2019	Phil	Molly	
2019	It Chapter Two	Young Gretta Keene (flashbacks)	

=== Television ===
Year	Series	Role	Notes
2007	Painkiller Jane	Little Girl	Episode: "Thanks for the Memories"
2007	Aliens in America	Young Anita	Episode: "The Metamorphosis"
2008	The Christmas Clause	Anna	TV movie
2009	Storm Seekers	Young Leah	TV movie
2009	The Guard	Ellie Vanderlee	Episode: "He Is Heavy, He's My Brother"
2009	Fringe	Little Girl	Episode: "Earthling"
2010	Life Unexpected	Young Lux Cassidy	Episode: "Storm Weathered"
2010	Hiccups	Little Bus Girl	Episode: "Autograph Hound"
2010	The Haunting Hour: The Series	Julia	2 episodes
2010	Psych	Little Sister	Episode: "Yang 3 in 2D"
2010	A Trace of Danger	Emily Arnold	TV movie
2011	He Loves Me	Emily	TV movie
2012	Supernatural	Tess McAnn	Episode: "Party On, Garth"
2013	Profile for Murder	Amber	TV movie
2014	Motive	Jackie Robinson	Episode: "Deception"
2014	Grumpy Cat's Worst Christmas Ever	Chrystal	TV movie
2015	Signed, Sealed, Delivered: Truth Be Told	Phoebe Amidon	TV movie
2015	Signed, Sealed, Delivered: The Impossible Dream	Phoebe Amidon	TV movie
2016	Operation Christmas	Danielle Roberts	TV movie
2019	See	Fethin	Episode: "Fresh Blood"
2020	Close Up	Abby	TV movie
2023	Creepshow	Dawn	Episode: "George Romero in 3-D!"

== Accolades ==
Year	Award	Category	Work	Result	Ref.
2014	Young Artist Award	Best Leading Young Actress in a Feature Film	Mama	Nominated	
