= Make Out Monday =

American pop punk band

- Origin: Los Angeles, California, United States
- Genres: Pop punk, pop rock
- Years active: 2014–present
- Label: SharpTone Records
- Members: Zack Shada; Seth Renken; Ezra Behrens
- Past members: Logan Charles John Spicer Jeremy Shada
- Website: makeoutmonday.com

Make Out Monday is an American pop punk, pop-folk and pop rock band formed in Los Angeles, California, in 2014. The band consists of Jeremy Shada, Zack Shada, John Spicer and Seth Renken. In November 2014, they self-released an EP, Kicking Cars. It sprouted three singles namely: Hope Less Romantics, Sirens and Twixter. A Special Edition version was then released in September 2015.

== History ==
The band was formed when brothers Zack and Jeremy Shada decided to put together two individual music projects into one. Zack and Jeremy moved to Los Angeles, California early on in their childhood and had been pursuing acts in the entertainment industry since. Formerly in a band with the other Shada brother Josh, Zack had started to play with future drummer Seth Renken and future lead guitarist John Spicer in various music groups. Former rhythm guitarist Logan Charles and Jeremy also had started doing their own music at this time. It was then when Zack and Jeremy had decided to combine both projects and form the band at present. On July 21, 2014, they had officially announced the formation of the band and released a music video for their first single "Hope Less Romantics".

The band had cited that they coined the name "Make Out Monday" as a joke at first. Jeremy stated that they liked the idea of "Something Monday" and said, "I was on my phone Instagramming [sic], and scrolling down there’s a hashtag #makeoutmonday. I thought it was the dumbest thing, so I said, 'Hey Zack, what about Make Out Monday?' Then we started laughing, but then we thought, 'No, that has a nice ring to it and it rolls out the tongue, and it’s like super marketable.'" However, they had found a deeper meaning for the name, stating it's a shorter version for "make it out of Monday" as a reference to people usually hating Mondays.

Because of Jeremy's role in popular cartoon Adventure Time, the band frequent their playing at numerous cons all over the world. Their first show however, was at the House of Blues in San Diego, California last July 2014. Since then they had played shows in various conventions at states all over the United States including the 2014 San Diego Comic-Con and opening for famous band New Politics at the Atlantic City Boardwalk Con in New Jersey. The band had also traveled to Australia for two shows in Adelaide and Brisbane at the Supanova Comic-Con. Recently, they performed for two nights at the World Trade Center in Metro Manila, Philippines for the much awaited phase one of Asia POP Comic Con. Here, they also released the Special Edition of their EP, including two new songs.

The band was also featured in Alex Gaskarth and Jack Barakat (of popular band All Time Low)'s famous podcast Full Frontal.

In a recent interview, the band has stated that they like being independent saying "We're working on a bunch of music. We're working on a full-length album, or maybe an extended EP. We're in no rush to sign." On September 25, 2015, they entered the Panda Studios in San Francisco, California to record some new songs.

The band toured the UK in June 2016 and finished recording their debut album late July.

The band released the music video for another single, "Desirae", in July 2017.

On February 24, 2018, the band released their first full album, Visions of Hollywood. The album consists of 11 songs including "Kissaphobic" and "Bullet for Your Sweetheart".

== Artistry ==
The band cites Fall Out Boy, My Chemical Romance, All Time Low, Pierce the Veil, and Paramore as big musical influences. They have also mentioned Led Zeppelin, Red Hot Chili Peppers, Thirty Seconds to Mars, Blink-182, and The Killers as their inspiration.

== Discography ==
=== Album ===
- Visions of Hollywood (2018)
- All Part of the Experience (2021)

=== EP ===
Title	Details
Kicking Cars	Released: 16 November 2014; 19 September 2015 (special edition); Label: Independent; Formats: CD, digital download
Night Terrors	Released: 23 October 2023; Label: Independent

=== Singles ===
Title	Details
Jersey	Released 23 November 2015; Label: Independent; Formats: digital download
Desirae	Released 31 July 2017; Label: Independent; Formats: music video, digital download
Don't Fall Asleep	Released 2 September 2019; Label: SharpTone Records(independent); Formats: music video, digital download
Blue Romance	Released 13 January 2020; Music Video released 31 December 2019; Label: SharpTone Records (independent); Formats: music video, digital download
Paper Houses	Released 13 January 2020; Music Video released 30 May 2020; Label: SharpTone Records(independent); Formats: music video, digital download
Bad Actress	Released 21 September 2020; Music Video released 24 February 2021; Label: SharpTone Records(independent); Formats: music video, digital download
Your Song (Elizabeth)	Released 11 March 2021; Label: SharpTone Records(independent); Formats: music video, digital download
