= Grumpy Cat's Worst Christmas Ever =

2014 American Christmas film

- DVD cover
- Genre: Comedy
- Written by: Tim Hill; Jeff Morris
- Directed by: Tim Hill
- Starring: Grumpy Cat Aubrey Plaza Megan Charpentier; Daniel Roebuck
- Theme music composer: Paul Leonard-Morgan
- Country of origin: United States
- Original language: English

Production
- Cinematography: Tom Harting
- Editors: Grumpy Cat; Austin Andrews; Greg Ng; Tony Dean Smith; Rafi Spivak
- Running time: 92 minutes

Original release
- Network: Lifetime
- Release: November 29, 2014

Grumpy Cat's Worst Christmas Ever (referred to onscreen as Grumpy Cat's Worst Christmas Ever! The Movie) is a 2014 made-for-television Christmas comedy film directed by Tim Hill, who also co-wrote the screenplay with Jeff Morris. The film stars Internet celebrity cat Tardar Sauce, also known as "Grumpy Cat", and Megan Charpentier as a young girl who befriends and later adopts Grumpy Cat, only to discover that the two can communicate with one another.

The film premiered on Lifetime on November 29, 2014, to generally negative reviews from critics.

== Premise ==
Grumpy Cat is a lonely and grumpy cat living in a mall pet shop that is slated to be closed. She is bitter at being constantly passed over for other animals in the store, but is surprised to find that she can communicate with Crystal, an equally lonely 12-year-old girl who is shocked that Grumpy Cat can "talk". The two are initially at odds, but start to befriend each other, especially after a high-priced Leonberger dog is dognapped from the pet shop for its value.

== Cast ==
- Grumpy Cat as herself
  - Aubrey Plaza as herself and the voice of Grumpy Cat
- Megan Charpentier as Crystal
- Daniel Roebuck as George
- Russell Peters as Santa Claus
- Shauna Johannesen as Tabby
- David Lewis as Marcus Crabtree
- Tyler Johnston as Gill Brockman
- Evan Todd as Zack
- Isaac Haig as Donny
- Jay Brazeau as Roger
- Stephen Stanton as the voice of JoJo the Dog
- Chris Williams as the voice of Lance the Gerbil
- Trevor Lissauer as the voice of Jackie the Jack Russell
- Trevor Devall as the voice of Wilson the Cockatoo

== Production ==
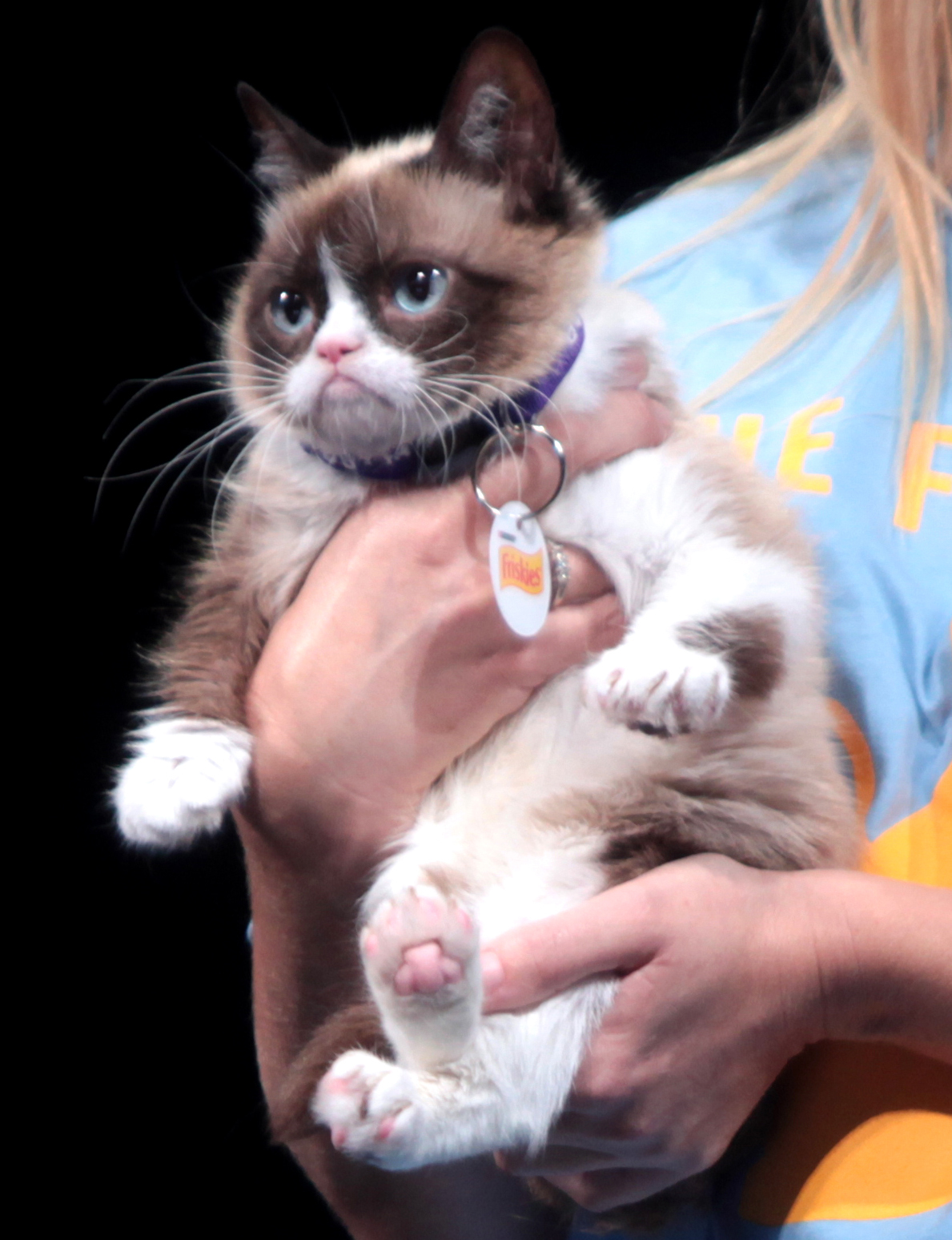
The film was made to showcase Tardar Sauce, better known as Grumpy Cat.

The film was created to showcase Tardar Sauce, the subject of an Internet meme which first appeared in 2012. By the end of 2013, the company which manages Grumpy Cat's image was valued at around $1 million. The company is managed by Ben Lashes, who is credited as an Executive Producer on Grumpy Cat's Worst Christmas Ever. Director and co-writer Tim Hill had previously directed Garfield: A Tail of Two Kitties and Alvin and the Chipmunks.

When Plaza was cast to perform Grumpy Cat's voice, she was initially unfamiliar with it, but learned about the cat before production. The film was shot in its entirety before Plaza recorded her lines. She re-drafted around 90% of her dialogue, explaining,

Once I realized that the cat's mouth wasn't going to move, I just kind of went for it, and thought, 'Well, if it's just going to cut to the cat and I can say my line, then I can just comment on other things, too.' The movie kind of has a Mystery Science Theater 3000 vibe to it, so it's like you're getting Grumpy's commentary throughout the whole thing, but then Grumpy is also starring in the story.

== Reception ==
The film was first broadcast at 8pm EST on November 29, 2014, on the Lifetime channel in the United States. A hashtag on Twitter representing the film, #WorstChristmasEver, trended during the first half of the movie. It was watched by 1.7 million viewers.

The film received mostly negative reviews. On review aggregator Rotten Tomatoes, the film holds an approval rating of 27%, based on 11 reviews, and an average rating of 4.17/10.

The A.V. Club and Entertainment Weekly both panned the film. The A.V. Club called it "the largest turd in [Lifetime's] crap crown of original programming...so unforgiving, so psychologically trying, that the process alone leaves the viewer straining to hear the dialogue over the sound of the soul being crushed wholesale, bone and sinew wrenched apart at the joint."

The Guardian, MySA, and St. Louis Post-Dispatch were more positive in their reviews, with the St. Louis Post-Dispatch commenting that although the film was "terrible" they still enjoyed it overall. The Hollywood Reporter also gave the film a positive review, stating "[t]he Christmas miracle of this movie is that Grumpy Cat's Worst Christmas Ever isn't the worst Christmas movie ever," and praising the writing and Aubrey Plaza's voice acting.

== See also ==
- List of Christmas films
- Santa Claus in film
