= MTV Movie Award for Best Musical Moment =

Category of MTV Movie Awards

- Awarded for: Quality songs
- Country: United States
- Presented by: MTV
- First award: 1992
- Website: mtv.com/ontv/movieawards/

The MTV Movie Award for Best Musical Moment is an award presented to singers/groups for quality songs in films at the MTV Movie Awards, a ceremony established in 1992. Honors in several categories are awarded by MTV at the annual ceremonies, and are chosen by public votes.

The MTV Movie Award for Best Song From a Movie was first given out in 1992 for Bryan Adams' "Everything I Do I Do It For You" from Robin Hood: Prince of Thieves. The award was last given out in 1999, and was replaced with Best Musical Sequence in 2000, but made a return in 2009 and retired again. It returned in 2012 renamed as Best Music and retired again before reappearing as Best Musical Sequence before changing in 2017 to its current name.

Bryan Adams, Bush and Whitney Houston have each won the Best Song honor from two nominations. Eric Clapton had received three nominations, and Boyz II Men, Céline Dion, Madonna, Bruce Springsteen and Sting have each been nominated twice.

== Best Song from a Movie ==
Year	Film	Song	Artist(s)
1992
1992	Robin Hood: Prince of Thieves	"Everything I Do I Do It For You"	Bryan Adams
1992	The Addams Family	"Addams Groove"	MC Hammer
1992	New Jack City	"I Wanna Sex You Up"	Color Me Badd
1992	Rush	"Tears in Heaven"	Eric Clapton
1992	Terminator 2: Judgment Day	"You Could Be Mine"	Guns N' Roses
1993
1993	The Bodyguard	"I Will Always Love You"	Whitney Houston
1993	Boomerang	"End of the Road"	Boyz II Men
1993	Lethal Weapon 3	"It's Probably Me"	Sting and Eric Clapton
1993	Aladdin	"A Whole New World"	Peabo Bryson and Regina Belle
1993	Singles	"Would?"	Alice in Chains
1994
1994	Free Willy	"Will You Be There"	Michael Jackson
1994	The Three Musketeers	"All for Love"	Bryan Adams, Rod Stewart and Sting
1994	Sliver	"Can't Help Falling in Love"	UB40
1994	Benny & Joon	"I'm Gonna Be (500 Miles)"	The Proclaimers
1994	Philadelphia	"Streets of Philadelphia"	Bruce Springsteen
1994	Sleepless in Seattle	"When I Fall in Love"	Céline Dion and Clive Griffin
1995
1995	The Crow	"Big Empty"	Stone Temple Pilots
1995	The Lion King	"Can You Feel the Love Tonight?"	Elton John
1995	Pulp Fiction	"Girl, You'll Be a Woman Soon"	Urge Overkill
1995	With Honors	"I'll Remember"	Madonna
1995	Above the Rim	"Regulate"	Warren G and Nate Dogg
1996
1996	Waiting to Exhale	"Sittin' Up In My Room"	Brandy
1996	Batman Forever	"Kiss From a Rose"	Seal
1996	Batman Forever	"Hold Me, Thrill Me, Kiss Me, Kill Me"	U2
1996	Dangerous Minds	"Gangsta's Paradise"	Coolio
1996	Waiting to Exhale	"Exhale (Shoop Shoop)"	Whitney Houston
1997
1997	Fear	"Machinehead"	Bush
1997	Evita	"Don't Cry for Me Argentina"	Madonna
1997	Phenomenon	"Change the World"	Eric Clapton and Babyface
1997	Romeo + Juliet	"#1 Crush"	Garbage
1998
1998	Men in Black	"Men In Black"	Will Smith
1998	An American Werewolf in Paris	"Mouth"	Bush
1998	A Life Less Ordinary	"Deadweight"	Beck
1998	Soul Food	"A Song for Mama"	Boyz II Men
1998	Titanic	"My Heart Will Go On"	Céline Dion
1999
1999	Armageddon	"I Don't Want To Miss A Thing"	Aerosmith
1999	City of Angels	"Iris"	Goo Goo Dolls
1999	Dr. Dolittle	"Are You That Somebody?"	Aaliyah
1999	Rush Hour	"Can I Get A..."	Jay-Z, Ja Rule and Amil
1999	Varsity Blues	"Nice Guys Finish Last"	Green Day
2009
2009	Hannah Montana: The Movie	"The Climb"	Miley Cyrus
2009	Slumdog Millionaire	"Jai Ho"	A. R. Rahman
2009	Twilight	"Decode"	Paramore
2009	The Wrestler	"The Wrestler"	Bruce Springsteen

== Best Musical Sequence ==
Year	Film	Song	Artist(s)
2000
2000	South Park: Bigger, Longer & Uncut	"Uncle F**ka"	Terrence and Philip (voiced by Matt Stone and Trey Parker)
2000	10 Things I Hate About You	"Can't Take My Eyes Off You"	Heath Ledger
2000	Austin Powers: The Spy Who Shagged Me	"Just the Two of Us"	Mike Myers and Verne Troyer
2000	The Talented Mr. Ripley	"Tu Vuo' Fa L'Americano"	Matt Damon, Jude Law and Rosario Fiorello
2001
2001	Coyote Ugly	"One Way or Another"	Piper Perabo
2001	Almost Famous	"Tiny Dancer"	Patrick Fugit, Kate Hudson, Billy Crudup, Jason Lee and Anna Paquin
2001	High Fidelity	"Let's Get It On"	Jack Black
2001	O Brother, Where Art Thou?	"Man of Constant Sorrow"	George Clooney, Tim Blake Nelson and John Turturro
2001	Road Trip	"I Wanna Rock"	Breckin Meyer, Seann William Scott, Paulo Costanzo and DJ Qualls
2002
2002	Moulin Rouge!	"Elephant Love Medley"	Nicole Kidman and Ewan McGregor
2002	A Knight's Tale	"Golden Years"	Heath Ledger and Shannyn Sossamon
2002	Moulin Rouge!	"Sparkling Diamonds"	Nicole Kidman
2002	Rush Hour 2	"Don't Stop 'Til You Get Enough"	Chris Tucker
2005
2005	Napoleon Dynamite	"Canned Heat"	Jon Heder
2005	13 Going on 30	"Thriller"	Jennifer Garner and Mark Ruffalo
2005	Anchorman: The Legend of Ron Burgundy	"Afternoon Delight"	Will Ferrell, Paul Rudd, Steve Carell, and David Koechner
2005	Harold & Kumar Go to White Castle	"Hold On"	John Cho and Kal Penn

== Best Music ==
Year	Film	Song	Artist(s)
2012
2012	21 Jump Street	"Party Rock Anthem"	LMFAO
2012	Drive	"A Real Hero"	College and Electric Youth
2012	Hanna	"The Devil Is in the Details"	Chemical Brothers
2012	Like Crazy	"IMpossible"	Figurine
2012	Project X	"Pursuit of Happiness (Steve Aoki remix)"	Kid Cudi

== Best Musical Moment ==
Year	Film / Series	Song	Artist(s)
2013
2013	Pitch Perfect	"No Diggity"	Anna Kendrick, Rebel Wilson, Anna Camp, Brittany Snow, Alexis Knapp, Ester Dean, and Hana Mae Lee
2013	Les Misérables	"I Dreamed a Dream"	Anne Hathaway
2013	Magic Mike	"It's Raining Men"	Channing Tatum, Matt Bomer, Joe Manganiello, Kevin Nash, and Adam Rodríguez
2013	The Perks of Being a Wallflower	"Come On Eileen"	Emma Watson, Logan Lerman, and Ezra Miller
2013	Silver Linings Playbook	"Don't You Worry 'bout a Thing / Fell in Love with a Girl"	Jennifer Lawrence and Bradley Cooper
2014
2014	This Is the End	"Everybody (Backstreet's Back)"	Backstreet Boys, Jay Baruchel, Seth Rogen and Craig Robinson
2014	American Hustle	"Live and Let Die"	Jennifer Lawrence
2014	Identity Thief	"I'm Gonna Be (500 Miles)", "Milkshake" and "Barracuda"	Melissa McCarthy
2014	We're the Millers	"Waterfalls"	Will Poulter
2014	The Wolf of Wall Street	"Pretty Thing"	Leonardo DiCaprio
2017
2017	Grease: Live	"You're the One That I Want"	Ensemble
2017	Beauty and the Beast	"Beauty and the Beast"	Ariana Grande and John Legend
2017	The Get Down	"Be That As It May"	Herizen F. Guardiola
2017	La La Land	"City of Stars"	Ryan Gosling and Emma Stone
2017	Moana	"How Far I'll Go"	Auliʻi Cravalho
2017	Trolls	"Can't Stop the Feeling!"	Justin Timberlake
2017	Hairspray Live!	"You Can't Stop the Beat"	Ensemble
2018
2018	Stranger Things	"Every Breath You Take"	Mike (Finn Wolfhard) and Eleven (Millie Bobby Brown) dance
2018	Black-ish	"Freedom"	Cast
2018	Call Me By Your Name	Elio crying through the end credits	
2018	Girls Trip	Dance Battle	
2018	The Greatest Showman	"Rewrite the Stars"	Phillip (Zac Efron) and Anne (Zendaya)
2018	Love, Simon	"I Wanna Dance With Somebody (Who Loves Me)"	Dream sequence (song originally by Whitney Houston)
2018	Riverdale	"A Night We’ll Never Forget"	Cast
2018	This Is Us	"Landslide"	Kate (Chrissy Metz)
2019
2019	A Star Is Born	"Shallow"	Lady Gaga and Bradley Cooper
2019	Bohemian Rhapsody	"Live Aid" Concert	
2019	Captain Marvel	"Just a Girl"	No Doubt
2019	Chilling Adventures of Sabrina	"Masquerade"	Kiernan Shipka, Ross Lynch, Lucy Davis, Jaz Sinclair, Tati Gabrielle, Gavin Leatherwood and Miranda Otto
2019	On My Block	"Look at That Butt"	Dillon Francis
2019	Riverdale	"Seventeen"	Lili Reinhart, Cole Sprouse, Vanessa Morgan and Madelaine Petsch
2019	Spider-Man: Into the Spider-Verse	"Sunflower"	Post Malone and Swae Lee
2019	The Umbrella Academy	"I Think We're Alone Now"	Tiffany
2021
2021	Julie and the Phantoms	"Edge of Great"	Madison Reyes, Charlie Gillespie, Owen Joyner and Jeremy Shada
2021	Black is King	"Brown Skin Girl"	Beyoncé, Saint Jhn and Wizkid featuring Blue Ivy Carter
2021	Bridgerton	"Wildest Dreams"	Duomo (song originally by Taylor Swift)
2021	Cobra Kai	"I Wanna Rock"	Twisted Sister
2021	Love and Monsters	"Stand by Me"	Ben E. King
2021	The Kissing Booth 2	"Lost in the Wild"	Walk the Moon
2021	To All the Boys: Always and Forever	"Beginning, Middle, End"	Leah
2021	WandaVision	"Agatha All Along"	Kathryn Hahn, Robert Lopez, Eric Bradley, Greg Whipple, Jasper Randall and Gerald White
2022
2022	Heartstopper	"Dance with Me"	Beabadoobee
2022	Bridgerton	"Wrecking Ball"	Midnight String Quartet (song originally by Miley Cyrus)
2022	Cinderella	"Million To One"	Camila Cabello
2022	Cobra Kai	"The Moment of Truth"	Carrie Underwood
2022	Emily in Paris	"Dynamite"	Ashley Park (song originally by BTS)
2022	Encanto	"We Don't Talk About Bruno"	Carolina Gaitán, Mauro Castillo, Adassa, Rhenzy Feliz, Diane Guerrero, Stephanie Beatriz and the Encanto Cast
2022	Euphoria	"Holding Out for a Hero"	Bonnie Tyler
2022	Halo	"Original Score"	Sean Callery
2022	High School Musical: The Musical: The Series	"The Rose Song"	Olivia Rodrigo
2022	House of Gucci	"Disco Fever"	
2022	Last Night in Soho	"Downtown"	Anya Taylor-Joy
2022	Peacemaker	"Do Ya Wanna Taste It"	Wig Wam
2022	Tick, Tick... Boom!	"Therapy"	Andrew Garfield and Vanessa Hudgens
2022	Turning Red	"Nobody Like U"	4*TOWN (Finneas, Jordan Fisher, Josh Levi, Grayson Villanueva & Topher Ngo)
2022	West Side Story	"America"	Ariana DeBose, David Alvarez, Ana Isabelle, the Sharks and Shark Girls
2022	Yellowjackets	"This Is How We Do It"	Montell Jordan
2023
2023	Purple Hearts	"Come Back Home"	Sofia Carson
2023	Daisy Jones & The Six	"Look at Us Now (Honeycomb)"	Sam Claflin
2023	Don't Worry Darling	Jack’s Tap Dance	
2023	Elvis	"Trouble"	Austin Butler (song originally by Elvis Presley)
2023	Ginny & Georgia	"I Will Survive" (Bachelorette Party)	Gloria Gaynor
2023	M3GAN	"Titanium"	Jenna Davis
2023	Matilda the Musical	"Revolting Children"	Charlie Hodson-Prior, Meesha Garbett and Children cast
2023	RRR	"Naatu Naatu"	Rahul Sipligunj and Kaala Bhairava
2023	She-Hulk: Attorney at Law	"Body"	Megan Thee Stallion
2023	Saturday Night Live	"Big Boys"	SZA, Keke Palmer, Cecily Strong, Ego Nwodim, and Punkie Johnson
2023	Stranger Things	"Running Up That Hill"	Kate Bush
2023	The Last of Us	"Long Long Time" (Bill & Frank Play Piano)	Linda Ronstadt
2023	The School for Good and Evil	"You Should See Me in a Crown"	Billie Eilish
2023	The Summer I Turned Pretty	"This Love (Taylor’s Version)"	Taylor Swift
2023	Wednesday	"Goo Goo Muck"	The Cramps
2023	Young Royals	"Simon’s Song"	Omar Rudberg
