= The Games Maker =

- Theatrical release poster
- Directed by: Juan Pablo Buscarini
- Written by: Juan Pablo Buscarini; Damon Syson; Lucinda Syson
- Produced by: Pablo Bossi; Juan Pablo Buscarini; Guido De Angelis; Marco De Angelis; Nicola De Angelis; José Ibáñez; Tina Roberts
- Starring: Joseph Fiennes; Tom Cavanagh; Megan Charpentier; Valentina Lodovini; Robert Verlaque; Ed Asner; David Mazouz
- Cinematography: Matías Mesa; Roman Osin
- Edited by: Austin Andrews
- Music by: Keith Power
- Production companies: Buena Vista International; Pampa Films; Sepia Films; Dap Italy; 7GLAB; Orinoco Films; Benteveo Producciones; Telefe
- Distributed by: Buena Vista Pictures Distribution; Walt Disney Studios Motion Pictures
- Release date: 26 June 2014
- Running time: 111 minutes
- Countries: Argentina; Canada; Italy
- Language: English
- Budget: $6 million
- Box office: $5.2 million

The Games Maker (Spanish: El inventor de juegos) is a 2014 Argentine-Canadian family adventure film co-written and directed by Juan Pablo Buscarini and starring Joseph Fiennes, Tom Cavanagh, Megan Charpentier, Valentina Lodovini, Robert Verlaque, Ed Asner, and introducing David Mazouz in his film debut. It tells the story of an aspiring board game inventor who stumbles upon the missing piece of the town's jigsaw puzzle and an encounter with the man who is pursuing him.

The film was met with mixed reviews.

== Plot ==
Young Ivan Drago places first in a mail-in contest for board game inventors, only to be disappointed after receiving the grand prize of a temporary tattoo. However, he soon discovers his tattoo is permanent, prompting his father to reach out to Ivan's long-estranged grandfather Nicholas. Soon after, Ivan's parents are lost in a balloon race, whereupon Ivan is placed in a strict school, where classmates and teachers alike constantly show their dislike for him. Ivan escapes the school to run away to Nicholas in Zyl, the games capital. Once there, Ivan learns that his tattoo matches a missing piece in the town jigsaw puzzle, and is a symbol of Morodian, the man who stole the puzzle piece and is responsible for Zyl's downfall as the greatest game-making town.

Ivan runs off to confront Morodian, who had been tracking Ivan his whole life, and was responsible for the disappearance of Ivan's parents. Morodian puts Ivan to work as his personal games maker, but Ivan escapes with the missing puzzle piece and his parents, who Morodian was keeping hostage. With Morodian vanquished, Ivan replaces the missing puzzle piece, his father is reunited with Ivan's grandfather, and Zyl is restored to its former glory.

== Cast ==
- David Mazouz as Ivan Drago
- Joseph Fiennes as Morodian
- Megan Charpentier as Anunciacion
- Tom Cavanagh as Mr. Drago
- Valentina Lodovini as Mrs. Drago
- Ed Asner as Nicholas Drago
- Robert Verlaque as Principal Possum
- Alejandro Awada as Engineer Gabler
- Vando Villamil as Ramuz
- Maiamar Abrodos as Miss Blum

== Reception ==
The Games Maker received mixed reviews. On review aggregator website Rotten Tomatoes, it has a 40% approval rating based on 5 reviews, and an average rating score of 4.6/10.
