= Owen Joyner =

American actor (born 2000)

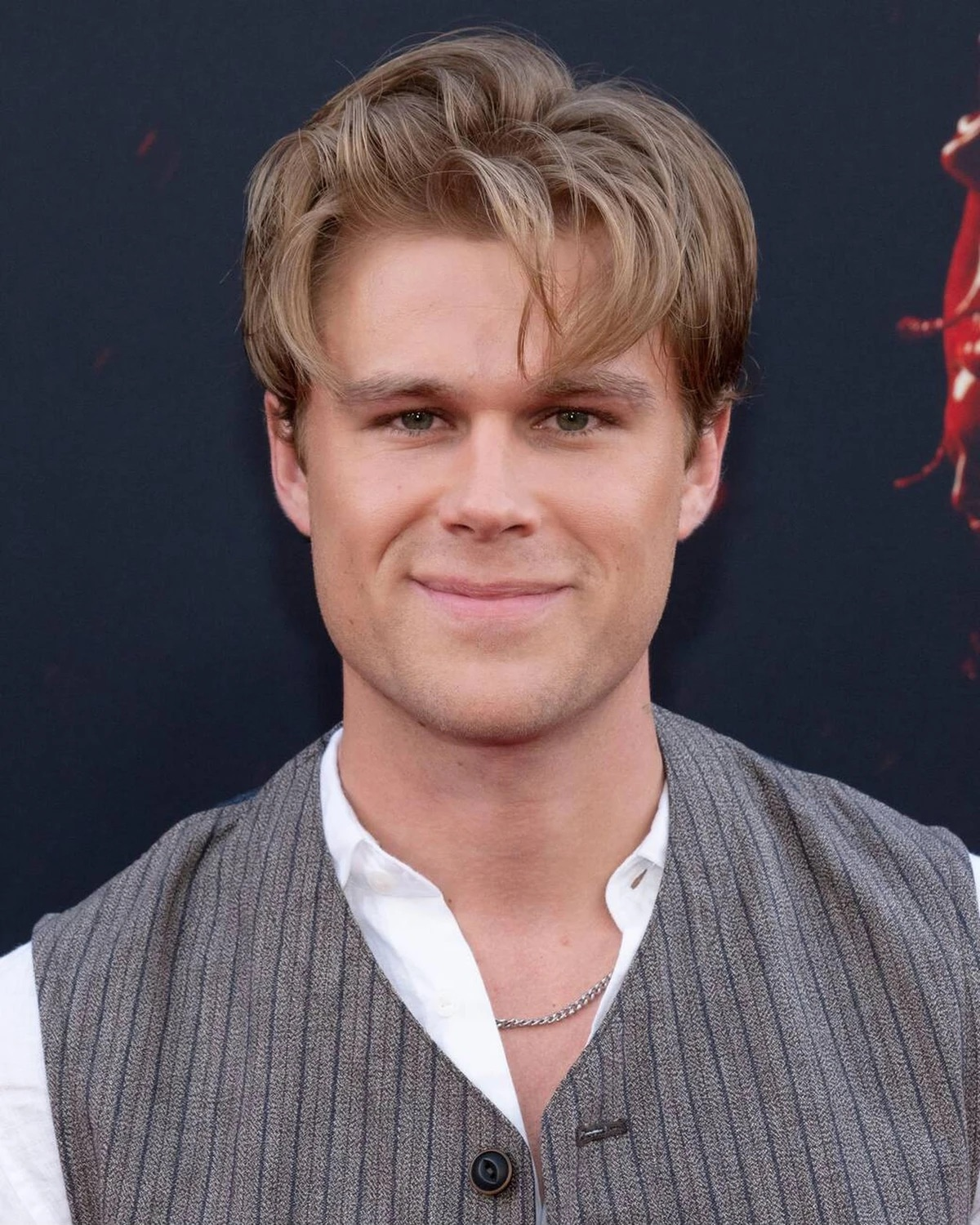
- Born: Owen Patrick Joyner; July 19, 2000 (age 26); Denver, Colorado, U.S.
- Occupation: Actor
- Years active: 2014–present

Owen Patrick Joyner (born July 19, 2000) is an American actor. He is known for playing Christian "Crispo" Powers on the Nickelodeon comedy television series 100 Things to Do Before High School, and for playing Arc on the Nickelodeon series Knight Squad. In 2020, he played the role of Alex in the Netflix series Julie and the Phantoms. He gained further recognition for his role of Bobby Campbell in the 2025 horror film Final Destination Bloodlines.

== Early life ==
Owen Patrick Joyner was born on July 19, 2000, in Denver, Colorado. He spent his early years in Germany and lived there until the age of 4, when he moved to Norman, Oklahoma. He has one older sister and six step-siblings. He is of German descent, and his first language is German.

Joyner started acting at the age of 10 through musical theatre at Sooner Theatre in Norman. He had been in over 20 productions before starting acting on film.

== Filmography ==
=== Film ===
Year	Title	Role	Notes	Ref.
2017	The Veil	Mountain tribe boy		
2025	Final Destination Bloodlines	Bobby Campbell		
TBA	Something Here	Dillon	Post-production	
TBA	The One Before The One	Brian	Post-production	

=== Television ===
Year	Title	Role	Notes	Ref.
2014–2016	100 Things to Do Before High School	Crispo	Main role	
2017	The Thundermans	Heinrich Hiddenville III	Episode: "Save the Past Dance"	
2018–2019	Knight Squad	Arc	Main role	
2019	Henry Danger	Arc	Episode: "Knight & Danger"	
2020	Julie and the Phantoms	Alex Mercer	Main role	
2022	Acapulco	Chad #2	Episode: "Glory Days"	

== Awards ==
Award	Year	Category	Work	Result	Ref.
MTV Movie & TV Awards	2021	Best Musical Moment	"Edge of Great" from Julie and the Phantoms	Won (Note: Shared with Madison Reyes, Charlie Gillespie and Jeremy Shada)	
