= Austin Andrews =

Canadian film editor

Austin Andrews is a Canadian film editor who won an Emmy Award for Outstanding Multiple Camera Editing for a Drama or Daytime Fiction Program at the 48th Daytime Emmy Awards for his work on the television series Julie and the Phantoms.

== Filmography ==
Year	Title	Director	Notes
2012	In Their Skin	Jeremy Power Regimbal	
2013	Hue: A Matter of Colour	Vic Sarin	
2014	The Games Maker	Juan Pablo Buscarini	Nominated—Argentine Academy of Cinematography Arts and Sciences Award for Best Film Editing
2014	The Boy From Geita	Vic Sarin	
2014	Grumpy Cat's Worst Christmas Ever	Tim Hill	co-editor
2015	Perfect High	Vanessa Parise	also associate producer
2016	Keepers of the Magic	Vic Sarin	also co-producer
2017	Drink Slay Love	Vanessa Parise	also associate producer
2018	Summer of '84	RKSS	also VFX supervisor
2018	Anthem of a Teenage Prophet	Robin Hays	also co-producer
2020	Julie and the Phantoms	Kabir Akhtar	Won—48th Daytime Emmy Awards for Outstanding Multiple Camera Editing for a Drama or Daytime Fiction Program
2024	Murder in a Small Town	Various directors	Series editor (seasons 1 and 2)
2025	The Island Between Tides	Austin Andrews Andrew Holmes	also writer/director. Won FilmQuest Cthulu Award for Best Feature Film. Nominated—Leo Awards in ten categories

== Awards and nominations ==
- 2021 48th Daytime Emmy Awards Award for Outstanding Multiple Camera Editing for a Drama or Daytime Fiction Program - Julie and the Phantoms - Winner
- 2017 Leo Awards Award for Best Picture Editing (Feature Length Documentary) - Keepers of the Magic - Nominee
- 2015 Leo Awards Award for Best Picture Editing (Television Movie) - Perfect High - Nominee
- 2014 Argentine Academy of Cinematography Arts and Sciences Award for Best Film Editing - The Games Maker - Nominee
