= Mama (2013 film) =

2013 supernatural horror film by Andy Muschietti

- Theatrical release poster
- Directed by: Andy Muschietti
- Screenplay by: Neil Cross; Andy Muschietti; Barbara Muschietti
- Story by: Andy Muschietti; Barbara Muschietti
- Based on: Mamá by Andy Muschietti
- Produced by: J. Miles Dale; Barbara Muschietti
- Starring: Jessica Chastain; Nikolaj Coster-Waldau
- Cinematography: Antonio Riestra
- Edited by: Michele Conroy
- Music by: Fernando Velázquez
- Production companies: Toma 78; De Milo Productions; Double Dare You
- Distributed by: Entertainment One (Canada); Universal Pictures (Worldwide)
- Release dates: 18 January 2013 (United States and Canada); 8 February 2013 (Spain)
- Running time: 100 minutes
- Countries: Canada; Spain
- Language: English
- Budget: $15 million
- Box office: $148.1 million

Mama is a 2013 English-language supernatural horror film directed and co-written by Andy Muschietti in his directorial debut and based on his 2008 Argentine short film Mamá. A co-production between Spain and Canada, the film stars Jessica Chastain, Nikolaj Coster-Waldau, Megan Charpentier, Isabelle Nélisse, Daniel Kash, and Javier Botet as the title character.

The film follows two young girls abandoned in a forest cabin, fostered by an unknown entity that they fondly call "Mama", which eventually follows them to their new suburban home led by two adults after their uncle retrieves them.

It was produced by J. Miles Dale and co-written by Barbara Muschietti, with Guillermo del Toro serving as executive producer. The film was theatrically released on 18 January 2013, by Universal Pictures. Mama received positive reviews from critics, although its story was criticized, and was a box office success, grossing $148 million against a $15 million budget.

== Plot ==
Distraught after losing his fortune in the 2008 financial crisis, stockbroker Jeffrey Desange murders his colleagues and his estranged wife before kidnapping his young daughters, 3-year-old Victoria and 1-year-old Lily. Driving recklessly on a snowy road, Jeffrey gets into a car crash, breaking Victoria's glasses. Surviving the collision, he takes the children to an abandoned cabin. Planning to kill his daughters and then himself, he prepares to shoot Victoria but is killed by a shadowy figure.

Five years later, a search party sponsored by Jeffrey's identical twin brother Lucas finds the cabin. Inside, they find the girls, 8-year-old Victoria and 6-year-old Lily, alive but feral after years of isolation. They are put in a welfare clinic under Dr. Gerald Dreyfuss. During therapy sessions they refer to "Mama," a mysterious maternal protector figure. The girls are initially hostile to Lucas but Victoria recognizes him after she wears glasses and can see properly. Dr. Dreyfuss offers accommodation for Lucas, his girlfriend Annabel and the two girls, in exchange for access to them during therapy sessions for research.

As the makeshift family settles in their new house, Victoria acclimates quickly to domestic life while Lily retains much of her feral behavior. Lucas is attacked by a mysterious entity and put into a coma, leaving Annabel to care for the girls alone. She makes progress with Victoria but Lily remains hostile. Alarmed by nightmares of a strange woman and Victoria's warning about Mama, Annabel asks Dreyfuss to investigate. Dreyfuss's research brings to light the story of Edith Brennan, a mentally ill asylum patient who died in the 1800s; he recovers a box from a government warehouse containing a baby's remains.

Annabel has a dream revealing Edith's past; when Edith was sent to the asylum, her child was given to nuns. She escaped and took her baby back, stabbing a nun. Fleeing her pursuers, she jumped off a cliff, but before hitting the water below, she and the child hit a large branch. Edith drowned, but the child's corpse snagged on the branch and did not fall with her. Edith hadn't realized her child was caught on the tree. Her troubled ghost, Mama, searched the woods for years until she discovered Victoria and Lily and took them as surrogates.

Lucas regains consciousness after a vision of his dead twin tells him to save his daughters. Victoria's growing closeness to Annabel makes her less willing to play with Mama, unlike Lily. Dreyfuss visits the abandoned asylum and is killed by Mama, who then attacks Annabel and the girls. She also kills their maternal great-aunt Jean and uses her body to spirit the children away. Annabel and Lucas find the children on the same cliff where Mama leaped with her infant.

Annabel, who found Dreyfuss' box of the child's remains, offers them to Mama. Mama recognizes her lost baby and her appearance briefly turns human. However, Lily calls out for Mama, causing her to revert to her monstrous form and attempt to take the girls. Victoria asks to stay with Annabel instead of leaving with Mama. Mama accepts and she and Lily plummet off the cliff. Mama and Lily are briefly shown as spirits happy to be united before hitting the branch and turning into a shower of moths. Annabel and Lucas embrace Victoria, who notices a moth landing on her hand, suggesting that Lily is still with her in spirit.

== Cast ==
- Jessica Chastain as Annabel "Annie"
- Nikolaj Coster-Waldau as Lucas "Luke" Desange and Jeffrey Desange
- Megan Charpentier as Victoria Desange
  - Morgan McGarry as Young Victoria
- Isabelle Nélisse as Lily Desange
  - Maya and Sierra Dawe as Young Lily
- Daniel Kash as Dr. Gerald Dreyfuss
- Javier Botet as Mama
  - Laura Guiteras and Melina Matthews as Mama (voice)
  - Hannah Cheesman as Beautiful Mama and Edith Brennan
- Jane Moffat as Jean Podolski
- David Fox as Burnsie
- Julia Chantrey as Nina
- Elva Mai Hoover as Secretary
- Dominic Cuzzocrea as Ron
- Diane Gordon as Louise

== Production ==
The film began production in Pinewood Toronto Studios on 3 October 2011. Production ended on 9 December 2011. Parts of the film were also shot in Quebec City, Quebec. Although the film was produced in Canada, it is set in Clifton Forge, Virginia. Much of the Mama character was filmed practically. To create the unnaturally jerky movements, Javier Botet was hung from a wire rig and his limbs were tugged at random times. Even heavily CGI-augmented scenes stitched different elements of Botet's performance.

The film was initially scheduled for release in October 2012, but was later rescheduled for January to avoid competing with Paranormal Activity 4. Its success at that later date has, among with other dump months horror films, convinced studios to start opening horror movies year-round.

== Reception ==
=== Critical reception ===
Mama received positive reviews from critics. It holds a 63% approval rating on Rotten Tomatoes based on 166 reviews, with an average rating of 5.90/10. The website's critical consensus states: "If you're into old school scares over cheap gore, you'll be able to get over Mama's confusing script and contrived plot devices." Metacritic gives the film a weighted average score of 57 out of 100, based on 35 critics, indicating "mixed or average reviews". Audiences polled by CinemaScore gave the film an average grade of "B-" on an A+ to F scale.

Richard Roeper, writing for the Chicago Sun-Times, enjoyed the film, giving it three stars out of four and saying, "Movies like Mama are thrill rides. We go to be scared and then laugh, scared and then laugh, scared and then shocked. Of course, there's almost always a little plot left over for a sequel. It's a ride I'd take again." Owen Gleiberman, reviewing for Entertainment Weekly, gave the movie a B and said, "Mama lifts almost every one of its fear-factor visuals from earlier films: the rotting black passageways that spread like mold over the walls (very Ringu meets Repulsion); the fire in her eyes; the crouched figures that skitter and pounce à la the infamous 'spider' outtake from the original Exorcist; the way that Mama, with her arms like smoky-shadowy bent tendrils, evokes both the monster from the Alien films and also, in a funny way, the crumpled-puppet gothic mischievousness of Tim Burton animation. Nothing in the movie is quite original, yet Muschietti, expanding his original short, knows how to stage a rip-off with frightening verve. It helps to have an actress on hand as soulful as Jessica Chastain..."

IGN editor Scott Corulla rated the film 7.3 out of 10 and wrote, "This is a fine first film for director Andrés Muschietti and, despite some missteps and disappointments, very well could be a harbinger of interesting things to come for the helmer." The Huffington Post wrote, "With Del Toro's name up front, expect Mama to be the winter horror film of choice in 2013." The Philadelphia Inquirer called the film an "effectively spooky ghost story", adding, "Mama is full of arty tropes – sepia-toned flashbacks, flickering lights, menacing murmurings. The atmosphere is positively spectral. And it's easy to see why del Toro is a champion: Like his Pan's Labyrinth, there's a fairy-tale aspect (the film even begins with the title card "Once upon a time..."), with children in jeopardy, a witchy monster, and edge-of-the-precipice confrontations." Canyon News wrote, "The scares do indeed come a mile a minute and will unnerve even some of the toughest moviegoers." Mick LaSalle of the Houston Chronicle wrote, "Director Andres Muschietti is cinematically literate – in one example he borrows a flashbulb effect from Hitchcock's Rear Window – and he has visual panache. Much of the movie is surprisingly beautiful."

=== Box office ===
In the United States, the film earned $28,402,310 on its opening weekend, debuting at #1 and playing at 2,647 theaters. It grossed $148.1 million worldwide and is a commercial success. Additionally, Jessica Chastain, for the second time in her career, claimed the top two spots of the box-office with her starring roles in Mama and Zero Dark Thirty.

=== Home media ===
The film was released on DVD and Blu-ray on 7 May 2013, by Universal Studios Home Entertainment. An Ultra HD Blu-ray release was released on 30 September 2025, by Shout! Studios under their Scream Factory imprint. It grossed $12.5 million in home sales.

== Accolades ==
Award	Category	Recipient(s)	Result	Ref.
Saturn Awards	Best Horror Film	Mama	Nominated	
Young Artist Award	Best Leading Young Actress in a Feature Film	Megan Charpentier	Nominated	
Young Artist Award	Best Supporting Young Actress in a Feature Film	Morgan McGarry	Nominated	
Young Artist Award	Best Supporting Young Actress in a Feature Film	Isabelle Nelisse	Nominated	
MTV Movie Award	Best Scared-As-Shit Performance	Jessica Chastain	Nominated	
People's Choice Awards	Favorite Horror Movie	Mama	Nominated	
Golden Trailer Awards	Best Horror	Mama	Won	
Golden Trailer Awards	Best Motion/Title Graphics	Universal Pictures	Nominated	
Golden Trailer Awards	Best Horror Poster	Universal Pictures	Nominated	

== Future ==
In February 2013, it was reported that a sequel was in the works. In January 2016, Universal announced that duo Dennis Widmyer and Kevin Kölsch would rewrite and direct the sequel. Chastain would not return for the sequel.

== See also ==
- List of Canadian films of 2013
- List of Spanish films of 2013
- La Llorona
