= Operation Christmas =

2010 Colombian military campaign

Operation Christmas was a campaign launched by the Colombian military during the Christmas season of 2010 to encourage FARC guerrillas to demobilize. The military selected nine 75-foot trees along paths the insurgents used and decorated them with Christmas lights and a message encouraging them to come home. The operation was deemed a success; 331 guerrillas demobilized while the campaign was active, a 30% increase from the previous year. It was followed by Operation Rivers of Light, where civilians close to the conflict areas as well as friends and relatives of guerrillas were encouraged to send a Christmas letter in floating LED-illuminated balls via rivers used by the insurgents. 180 guerrillas demobilized during the campaign's duration, including one of FARC's main bomb makers. A study on individual demobilization from the FARC, based on information about 19,504 reported deserters between 2002 and 2017, did not find any impact of the Christmas campaigns, including Operation Christmas (2010), Operation Rivers of Light (2011) and Operation Bethlehem (2012), on demobilization rates.

== Background ==
Colombia has been involved in a low-intensity insurgency since 1964 with paramilitary groups and guerrillas, mainly The Revolutionary Armed Forces of Colombia (FARC). Since the early 1980s, the government has been engaged in sporadic peace talks, convincing such groups as the EPL and the EPR to demobilize. In 2002, the government launched the Program of Humanitarian Attention to the Demobilised with a promise to reintegrate former guerrillas by supporting them with education, job training, and psychological support. Colombia's National Ministry of Defence worked with an advertising agency to research the lives of former guerrillas and to understand why they had joined FARC and what the conditions were like in the jungle. Early campaigns began with radio and television advertisements featuring former insurgents appealing to others to turn themselves in. These programs succeeded in convincing many to surrender, but rates eventually slowed when only the more entrenched remained. FARC commanders also began restricting radio access.

Christmas had always been a big time for demobilizations so the campaign's next step was focused on that emotional period. Nine 75-foot trees were selected that were adjacent to paths identified by the military as frequently used by the guerrillas. The Colombian military agreed not to use the campaign as an opportunity to attack insurgents while it was active. The trees were decorated with Christmas lights and a motion sensor that activated them when someone walked nearby. A banner next to them said,

"If Christmas can come to the jungle, you too can come home. Demobilize. At Christmas, everything is possible."

Once the trees were revealed, they attracted international attention. The operation was credited for the demobilization for 331 rebels that year, a 30% increase from the previous year.

== Operation Rivers of Light ==
Following the success of Operation Christmas, Operation Rivers of Lights was developed a year later. Using the Colombian Army Radio Service, people across the country with a friend or relative who was a guerrilla were encouraged to write them a Christmas letter. The letters were encased in floating balls illuminated with a blue LED and sent adrift down rivers that the insurgents were known to use. 180 guerrillas surrendered while the operation was active. Of note was the surrender of 10 insurgents and their commander, a FARC commander and bomb maker. They also brought with them a cache of weapons.
