= Zack Shada =

American actor

- Born: Zachary David Shada; Boise, Idaho, U.S.
- Occupation: Actor
- Years active: 2002–2018 (actor)
- Relatives: Jeremy Shada (brother)
- Musical career
- Genre: Pop rock
- Instruments: Vocals; bass
- Label: SharpTone Records
- Member of: Make Out Monday

External image
- Shada at an event for Space Chimps in 2008

Zachary David Shada is an American actor. He is best known for the Jane Doe movies (2005-2008).

== Life and career ==
Shada was born Zachary David Shada in Boise, Idaho. His brothers are actors Josh and Jeremy Shada.

He appeared as Thin Boy in Charlie's Angels: Full Throttle (2003), and as Nick Davis in the 2005 television film Jane Doe: Vanishing Act and its sequels. He has appeared in two episodes of Lost, three episodes of Wizards of Waverly Place, and voiced Comet in Space Chimps.

Shada voiced the character Pen in the pilot for the Cartoon Network series Adventure Time. His brother Jeremy was later cast in the role, with the character being renamed Finn.

Jeremy and Zack Shada are members of the pop-punk band Make Out Monday.

== Filmography ==
=== Film ===
Year	Title	Role	Notes
2003	Charlie's Angels: Full Throttle	Thin Boy	
2005–2008	Jane Doe	Nick Davis	Television films
2006	Ice Age: The Meltdown	Additional voices	
2006	The Break-Up	Mad Dawg Killa (voice)	
2006	The Ant Bully	Blonde Boy (voice)	
2007	Star and Stella Save the World	Brandon	Television film
2007	Disney Princess Enchanted Tales: Follow Your Dreams	Hakeem (voice)	Direct-to-video
2008	Space Chimps	Comet (voice)	
2010	Space Chimps 2: Zartog Strikes Back	Comet (voice)	
2013	Revenant	Boyd	Short film

=== Television ===
Year	Title	Role	Notes
2002	According to Jim	Young Pierson	Episode: "Father Disfigure"
2003	Mad TV	Crippled Boy	Episode #9.10
2004	The John Henson Project	Bobby Knight	Episode: "Maid in France"
2005	Justice League Unlimited	Young Scott Free (voice)	Episode: "The Ties That Bind"
2006	Lilo & Stitch: The Series	Mikey Blumberg (voice)	Episode: "Lax"
2006	Lost	Young Liam Pace	2 episodes
2007	The Batman	Boy (voice)	Episode: "Ring Toss"
2008	Wizards of Waverly Place	Joey	3 episodes
2008	Random! Cartoons	Pen (voice)	Episode: "Adventure Time"
2009	Grey's Anatomy	Andy Michaelson	2 episodes
2010	Batman: The Brave and the Bold	Aqualad (voice)	Episode: "Sidekicks Assemble!"
2011	Big Time Rush	Aaron	Episode: "Big Time Problems"
2018	Spider-Man	Hippo, additional voices	2 episodes

== Awards and nominations ==
Award	Year	Category	Result	Work
Young Artist Award	2008	Best Performance in a TV Movie, Miniseries or Special - Supporting Young Actor	Won	Jane Doe: Ties That Bind
