= Julie and the Phantoms =

2020 American musical comedy drama streaming television series

- Genre: Musical; Comedy drama
- Created by: Dan Cross and David Hoge
- Based on: Julie e os Fantasmas by Paula Knudsen, Tiago Mello, and Fabio Danesi
- Starring: Madison Reyes; Charlie Gillespie; Owen Patrick Joyner; Jeremy Shada; Jadah Marie; Sacha Carlson; Savannah May
- Music by: David Lawrence
- Country of origin: United States
- Original language: English
- No. of seasons: 1
- No. of episodes: 9

Production
- Executive producers: Kenny Ortega; Dan Cross; David Hoge; Michel Tikhomiroff; Fabio Danesi; George Salinas; Jaime Aymerich
- Producers: Jameson Parker; Thierry Tanguy
- Production locations: Burnaby, British Columbia
- Cinematography: Jon Joffin
- Editors: Don Brochu; Dan Krieger; Austin Andrews
- Running time: 24–38 minutes
- Production companies: Cross Hoge Productions; 5678 Productions; Mixer Films; Crossover Entertainment LLC; Brightlight Pictures

Original release
- Network: Netflix
- Release: September 10, 2020

Julie and the Phantoms is an American musical comedy-drama television series created by Dan Cross and David Hoge that was released via streaming on Netflix on September 10, 2020. It is based on the Brazilian television series Julie e os Fantasmas. In December 2021, the series was cancelled after one season.

== Cast and characters ==
=== Main ===
- Madison Reyes as Julie Molina, a high school musician who is struggling to make music after the death of her mother but accidentally summons the spirits of a deceased band from the year 1995, whom she becomes the lead singer of. Early in the series, she has an unrequited crush on Nick, but later Luke becomes her love interest.
- Charlie Gillespie as Luke Patterson, a singer and the lead guitarist of the Phantoms, who soon becomes Julie's love interest
- Owen Patrick Joyner as Alex Mercer, the Phantoms' drummer, who falls in love with another ghost named Willie
- Jeremy Shada as Reggie Peters, the bass player of the Phantoms
- Jadah Marie as Flynn, Julie's best friend, who eventually finds out about the ghost band who died in 1995
- Sacha Carlson as Nick, Carrie's boyfriend, and Julie's lifelong love interest
- Savannah May as Carrie, Julie's nemesis, and a former friend; the lead singer of Dirty Candy and the daughter of Trevor Wilson

=== Recurring ===
- Cheyenne Jackson as Caleb Covington, a famous ghost who owns the Hollywood Ghost Club
- Carlos Ponce as Ray Molina, Julie and Carlos's father
- Sonny Bustamante as Carlos Molina, Julie's younger brother, who becomes suspicious of the ghost band and becomes a junior ghost hunter
- Alison Araya as Aunt Victoria, Julie's aunt, and Ray's sister-in-law
- Marci T. House as Mrs. Harrison, Julie's music program teacher
- Booboo Stewart as Willie, a fellow ghost who loves to skateboard, and who also becomes Alex's love interest

== Production ==
=== Development ===
On April 9, 2019, Kenny Ortega signed a multi-year overall deal with Netflix, including production of Julie and the Phantoms. Ortega executive produced the series alongside Dan Cross, David Hoge, George Salinas, and Jaime Aymerich. Cross and Hoge also serve as showrunners. In an October 2020 interview with Collider, Ortega discussed the creative vision behind the series and the importance of casting performers who could both act and sing authentically. Production companies involved with the series were slated to consist of Crossover Entertainment and Mixer Entertainment. On August 26, 2020, an official trailer was released and the series was released on September 10, 2020. On December 18, 2021, Netflix cancelled the series after one season. On March 4, 2022, Ortega confirmed that there are no plans for the series to return to Netflix or anywhere else for the time being.

=== Casting ===
On July 21, 2020, upon series premiere date announcement, Madison Reyes, Charlie Gillespie, Jeremy Shada, Owen Patrick Joyner, Jadah Marie, Sacha Carlson, and Savannah May were cast in the starring roles while Booboo Stewart, Cheyenne Jackson, Carlos Ponce, and Sonny Bustamante were cast in recurring roles.

=== Filming ===
Principal photography for the series began on September 17, 2019 and ended on December 14, 2019 in Burnaby, British Columbia. Many scenes were filmed at The Bridge Studios in Burnaby, while exterior shots, including the high school scenes, were filmed at the University of British Columbia campus.

== Music ==
A soundtrack was released on September 10, 2020, alongside the series' debut on the streaming service.

== Episodes ==
No.	Title	Directed by	Written by	Original release date
1	"Wake Up"	Kenny Ortega	Teleplay by : David Hoge & Dan Cross	September 10, 2020
In 1995, the band Sunset Curve performs a soundcheck at the Orpheum in Los Angeles, where they are set to perform later that night. Just before their big show, Luke, Alex, and Reggie leave to eat "street dogs" while their fourth bandmate, Bobby, stays back to flirt with a waitress named Rose. Tragically, the street dogs turn out to be rancid and the three Sunset Curve members die from food poisoning. Twenty-five years later, teenager Julie Molina is kicked out from her school's music program after a year of being emotionally unable to play music due to her mother's death. While cleaning out her mother's studio, Julie finds and plays a Sunset Curve CD and unintentionally summons the three deceased Sunset Curve members as ghosts. Despite her initial fear, Julie allows them to stay and is inspired by them to make music again, playing a song by her mother on the piano. Songs: "Now or Never" – Sunset Curve; "Wake Up" – Julie
2	"Bright"	Kenny Ortega	David Hoge & Dan Cross	September 10, 2020
After Julie performs for the first time in a year, the boys are impressed and think about forming a band with her. Julie and Flynn try to convince the music teacher to let Julie rejoin the music program, but he refuses. At a school rally, encouraged by the boys, Julie performs Luke’s song “Bright” after her archenemy, Carrie and her band, Dirty Candy, performs. During the performance, the boys suddenly appear onstage and play with her, becoming visible to the crowd. When the song ends, they disappear, and everyone assumes they were holograms. Songs: "This Band Is Back (Reggie's Jam)" – Sunset Curve; "Wow" – Dirty Candy; "Bright" – Julie and Sunset Curve
3	"Flying Solo"	Paul Becker	Sean W. Cunningham & Marc Dworkin	September 10, 2020
After the band vanishes, Julie tells everyone they were holograms and is allowed back into the music program. Flynn is upset when Julie keeps lying about the band. The boys decide that forming a band with Julie is their second chance. Julie later tells Flynn the truth about the ghosts, but Flynn doesn’t believe her at first. When Julie performs “Flying Solo,” the band appears, proving to Flynn that they are real. Songs: "Flying Solo" – Julie and Sunset Curve
4	"I Got the Music"	Kenny Ortega	Nora Sullivan	September 10, 2020
The episode opens with Julie and the school singing "I Got the Music", though it is unclear whether it is a dream or not. Willie takes Alex to a closed museum to try and loosen him up. As the boys and Julie collaborate on a new song, Julie tells them about the music of Trevor Wilson which shocks the boys as they discover Trevor is really their former bandmate Bobby, who stole their music and credited it for his own, which has made him rich and famous. Trevor Wilson also is Carrie's father. The boys poof out to haunt Trevor. As part of their revenge against Trevor, the guys ask Willie for help. Willie takes them to the Hollywood Ghost Club to meet Caleb Covington, a ghost with strong powers, and it is revealed that Alex has a crush on Willie. Songs: "I Got the Music" – Julie with the high school students
5	"The Other Side of Hollywood"	Kenny Ortega	David Hoge & Dan Cross	September 10, 2020
Caleb Covington introduces Luke, Alex, and Reggie to the Hollywood Ghost Club. The boys are mesmerized by the elaborate musical production numbers. Meanwhile, Flynn DJs at the high school dance where Julie and the Phantoms are to perform later. However, the phantoms soon lose track of time, and Julie is forced to cancel her gig at the dance as a result. As the boys are leaving the club, realizing how late it is, they are given a mysterious stamp by Caleb. When they arrive at the school, Julie, upset with them, confronts them and quits the band. As Julie leaves, the boys suddenly experience a painful jolt, which Reggie compares to how they died 25 years ago. Songs: "The Other Side of Hollywood" – Caleb Covington with Hollywood Ghost Club orchestra and dancers
6	"Finally Free"	Kristin Hanggi	Sean W. Cunningham & Marc Dworkin	September 10, 2020
At Julie's dance class, the boys' lacrosse team coach forces the team to join it to improve their mobility so they can win a game. Nick, Carrie's boyfriend and Julie's crush, and Julie become dance partners. Luke signs up the band for a local talent contest, hoping to get Julie to rejoin the band following the dance. Julie accuses Luke of being selfish, but Alex and Reggie show Julie he isn't by taking her to Luke's parents' house where Luke visits frequently since his death. Julie has a change of heart and helps the boys practice a new song for their performance. However, Julie's father finds that Julie missed three of her classes and a calculus test when she overslept so he grounds her. Julie disobeys her dad and sneaks out of her bedroom to make their performance. After Julie and the Phantoms perform, a talent scout approaches Julie, but as she introduces herself to the band, Julie's father shows up and orders her home. Songs: "All Eyes on Me" – Dirty Candy; "Finally Free" – Julie and the Phantoms
7	"Edge of Great"	Kabir Akhtar	Nora Sullivan & Leilani Downer	September 10, 2020
After Ray reprimands Julie for sneaking out, Julie manages to convince him to allow her to continue performing with the band. Ray feels guilty about interrupting the meeting of the talent scout and the band, so he agrees to throw a party at their house so the band can perform. Luke flirts with Julie under the guise of discussing what song to perform at the party. Nick interrupts them as he is nervous about their dance performance. As Nick and Julie perform their dance number, Julie imagines it is Luke she is dancing with. Alex catches Willie spying on him and confronts him, but Willie leaves abruptly, leaving Alex confused. Later, Julie and the Phantoms perform, which Ray records and uploads to the Internet. Willie decides to come clean and explain that the boys can cheat Caleb's curse and cross over if they complete their "unfinished business", which the boys quickly put together as performing at the Orpheum. Songs: "Perfect Harmony" – Julie and Luke; "Edge of Great" – Julie and the Phantoms
8	"Unsaid Emily"	Kabir Akhtar	Leah Keith	September 10, 2020
While Alex arrives at the Orpheum, he reminisces about the night he, Luke, and Reggie died. Willie shows up and apologizes to him about introducing them to Caleb. Julie visits Luke's parents to give them a song, which Luke wrote about his mother. Julie hopes that doing so will help Luke. Luke tells Julie that the band has unfinished business that they need to complete before they can cross over or else they will cease to exist. Julie is dismayed at first, but after finding a Sunset Curve T-shirt in her mother's possessions, she realizes the boys are connected to her mother (Rose, the waitress in the first episode, is revealed to be Julie's mother). While Julie is sad she may never see them again, she helps them to come up with a plan to perform at the Orpheum. Songs: "Unsaid Emily" – Sunset Curve
9	"Stand Tall"	Kenny Ortega	David Hoge & Dan Cross	September 10, 2020
Willie helps Julie and the Phantoms become the opening act for Panic! at the Disco at the Orpheum. Caleb kidnaps the boys to the Hollywood Ghost Club and forces them to perform with him, causing Julie to panic when they don’t show up. Julie performs alone until the boys escape and appear onstage one by one to finish the song with her. Afterward, Julie thinks they have crossed over, but they return and reveal the Orpheum was not their unfinished business. Their bond with Julie breaks Caleb’s curse, but later Caleb possesses Nick, setting up a new threat. Songs: "You Got Nothing to Lose" – Caleb; "Stand Tall" – Julie and the Phantoms

== Reception ==
=== Critical response ===
Caroline Framke of Variety wrote, "Sure, their ghost adventures become very silly, very quickly. But who cares! Julie and the Phantoms is just fun and adorable enough for none of that to really matter."

For the series, review aggregator Rotten Tomatoes reported an approval rating of 93% based on 27 reviews, with an average rating of 8.4/10. The website's critics consensus reads, "With catchy tunes and just the right amount of ghost jokes, Julie and the Phantoms is a fun, feel-good show that proves a perfect showcase for newcomer Madison Reyes." Metacritic gave the series a weighted average score of 77 out of 100 based on 7 reviews, indicating "generally favorable reviews".

=== Accolades ===
Year	Award	Category	Nominee(s)	Result	Ref.
2021	Golden Tomato Awards	Fan Favorite TV Series 2020	Julie and The Phantoms	Won	
2021	MTV Movie & TV Awards	Best Musical Moment	Madison Reyes, Charlie Gillespie, Owen Joyner and Jeremy Shada (Song: "Edge of Great")	Won	
2021	Daytime Emmy Awards	Outstanding Original Song	Hannah Asres Jones, Jack Kugell and Matt Wong (Song: "I Got the Music")	Nominated	
2021	Daytime Emmy Awards	Outstanding Original Song	Litvin and Rockwell (Song: "The Other Side of Hollywood")	Nominated	
2021	Daytime Emmy Awards	Outstanding Original Song	Michelle Lewis and Dan Petty (Song: "Unsaid Emily")	Won	
2021	Daytime Emmy Awards	Outstanding Casting for a Drama or Daytime Fiction Program	Natalie Hart and Jason La Padura	Nominated	
2021	Daytime Emmy Awards	Outstanding Costume Design/Styling for a Drama or Daytime Fiction Program	Soyon An and Eilidh McAllister	Won	
2021	Daytime Emmy Awards	Outstanding Multiple Camera Editing for a Drama or Daytime Fiction Program	Don Brochu, Dan Krieger, Austin Andrews	Won	
2021	Daytime Emmy Awards	Outstanding Hairstyling for a Drama or Daytime Fiction Program	Katalin Lippay, Tammy Bailey, Paula Demille and Frances Smith	Nominated	
2021	Daytime Emmy Awards	Outstanding Makeup for a Drama or Daytime Fiction Program	Tracy George, Francesca Cervellin and Trudy Parisien	Nominated	
2021	Daytime Emmy Awards	Outstanding Sound Mixing and Editing	Don Brochu, Dan Krieger, Austin Andrews, Sandra Portman, Karla Melendez, Hugh Wielenga, Laurie Melhus	Nominated	
2021	Daytime Emmy Awards	Outstanding Writing Team for a Daytime Fiction Program	Dan Cross and David Hoge	Nominated	
2021	Daytime Emmy Awards	Outstanding Younger Performer in a Daytime Fiction Program	Madison Reyes	Nominated	
2021	Daytime Emmy Awards	Outstanding Performance by a Supporting Actor in a Daytime Fiction Program	Cheyenne Jackson	Nominated	
2021	Daytime Emmy Awards	Outstanding Young Adult Series	Julie and The Phantoms	Nominated	
