= Jeremy Shada =

American actor (born 1997)

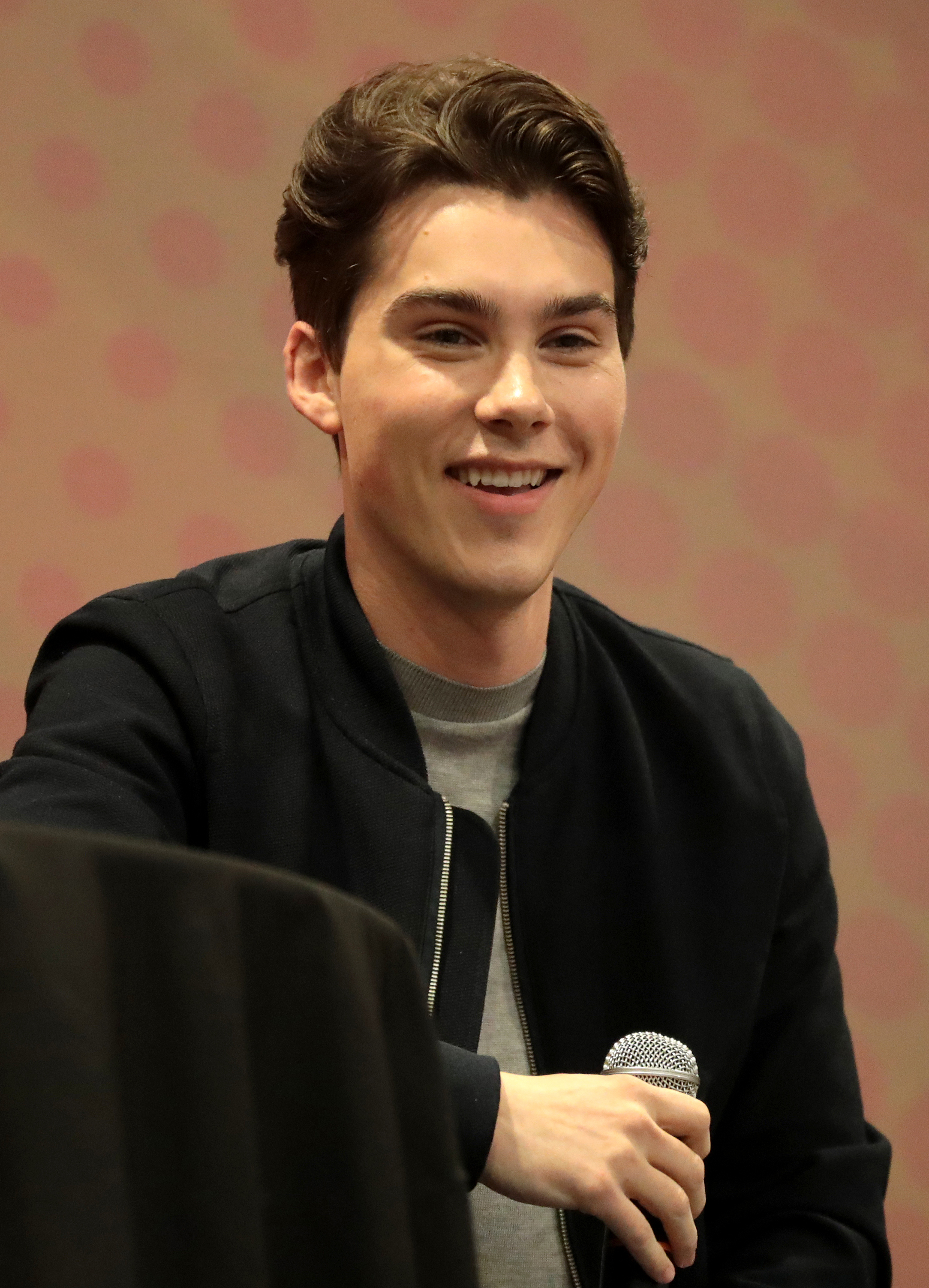
- Shada at the Phoenix Fan Fusion in 2019
- Born: January 21, 1997 (age 29)
- Occupations: Actor; musician; singer
- Years active: 2004–present
- Spouse: Carolynn Rowland (m. 2020)
- Children: 2
- Relatives: Zack Shada (brother)
- Musical career
- Genre: Pop rock
- Instruments: Vocals; bass
- Label: SharpTone Records
- Formerly of: Make Out Monday

Jeremy Shada (/ˈʃeɪdə/; born January 21, 1997) is an American actor, musician and singer. He is best known for his work as the voice of Finn the Human from the American animated television franchise Adventure Time and Lance in Voltron: Legendary Defender. He is also known for his performances in the sketch-comedy series Incredible Crew, the 2020 Netflix musical series Julie and the Phantoms, and DreamWorks Dragons: The Nine Realms.

== Life and career ==
Shada began acting at the age of seven, soon after moving to Los Angeles with his family. He was inspired to act by his older brother, actor Zack Shada.

Shada initially appeared in commercials. Later on, he began auditioning for voice acting and theatrical performances, taking advice from a voice-over agent. His first live-action theatrical role was as Young Kurt Diamond in No Rules. He has since appeared in additional live-action and voice acting roles, such as playing young Charlie Pace in childhood flashbacks on Lost.

In 2009, Jeremy Shada's agent approached him with the idea of auditioning for the role of Finn in Adventure Time; his brother Zack had been the original voice of Finn (originally named Penn) in the pilot episode of Adventure Time three years prior. After viewing the pilot on YouTube, Shada matched his voice with the voice of his brother in auditions with Adventure Time creator Pendleton Ward and the show's producers, which earned him the role.

In 2012, Shada joined the cast of Nick Cannon's sketch-comedy series, Incredible Crew. In June 2012, to promote Incredible Crew's 2013 premiere, Cartoon Network released a music rap video titled "Running Errands with My Mom" which features Shada performing and rapping the lyrics. The video has since generated over one million views.

Due to his acting career, Shada was homeschooled.

=== Musical career ===
Along with his brother Zack, Shada is a member of the pop-punk band Make Out Monday, which was formed in 2014. The band performed at the 2014 San Diego Comic-Con.

== Personal life ==
On March 8, 2020, Shada married Carolynn Rowland, a company dancer with Los Angeles Ballet. Their first son was born in August 2024, and their second son was born in June 2026.

== Filmography ==
=== Film ===
Year	Title	Role	Notes
2004	Miracle Run	Young Phillip	Television film
2004	Team America: World Police	Jean Francois	Voice
2005	No Rules	Young Kurt Diamond	
2005	My Neighbors the Yamadas	Additional voices	English dub
2006	Southern Comfort	Colton	Television film
2007	Love's Unending Legacy	Boy in Stagecoach	Television film
2009	Cloudy with a Chance of Meatballs	Additional voices	
2012	ParaNorman	Pug	Voice
2012	Cartoon Network 20th Anniversary	Finn	Voice, television film
2013	Aliens in the House	Mikey	Television film
2017	Surf's Up 2: WaveMania	Cody Maverick	Voice; replacing Shia LaBeouf
2018	Cheerleader Nightmare	Tyler Dell	Television film

=== Television ===
Year	Title	Role	Notes
2004	ER	Bobby	Episode: "Time of Death"
2004	Good Girls Don't	Young David	Episode: "Sole Mates"
2006	Nip/Tuck	Kid No. 1	Episode: "Reefer"
2006	Lost	Young Charlie Pace	2 episodes
2007	Shark	C.J. Chambers	Episode: "Blind Trust"
2007	Ghost Whisperer	Liam Fletcher	2 episodes
2007	The Loop	Luxembourgish Boy	Episode: "CSI: Donut Idol Bowl"
2007	Cold Case	Jack Raymes '94	Episode: "Thrill Kill"
2009	Chowder	Porridge (voice)	Episode: "My Big Fat Stinky Wedding"
2009–2011	Batman: The Brave and the Bold	Young Robin	Voice, 5 episodes
2010	Parenthood	First Baseman	"The Situation"
2010–2018	Adventure Time	Finn the Human, Cosmic Owl, additional voices	Main voice role Only played Cosmic Owl in Prisoners of Love
2013	Incredible Crew	Various characters	
2013	See Dad Run	Brendan	Episode: "See Dad Send Emily Flowers"
2013	Cartoon Network	Rapper	Music Video: It's What You Do (Jeremy Shada's and Shauna Case's Rap)
2016–2018	Voltron: Legendary Defender	Lance	Voice
2016–2018	Mr. Student Body President	Tyler Prendergast	Main role; Go90 exclusive
2018	Spider-Man	Ross Caliban	Voice, episode: "How I Thwipped My Summer Vacation"
2020–2021	Adventure Time: Distant Lands	Finn the Human	Voice
2020	Julie and the Phantoms	Reggie Peters	Main role
2021–2023	Dragons: The Nine Realms	Tom Kullersen	Voice
2022	Interrupting Chicken	Hercules	Voice, episode: "Hercul-easy"
2023–	Adventure Time: Fionna and Cake	Finn the Human	Voice

=== Video games ===
Year	Title	Voice role
2011	F.E.A.R. 3	Young Paxton Fettel
2012	Adventure Time: Hey Ice King! Why'd You Steal Our Garbage?!!	Finn the Human
2013	Adventure Time: Explore the Dungeon Because I Don't Know!	Finn the Human
2014	Adventure Time: The Secret of the Nameless Kingdom	Finn the Human
2015	Code Name S.T.E.A.M.	Tom Sawyer
2015	Adventure Time: Finn & Jake Investigations	Finn the Human
2015	Cartoon Network Superstar Soccer: Goal	Finn the Human
2016	Lego Dimensions (Adventure Time Level Pack)	Finn the Human
2017	Guardians of the Galaxy: The Telltale Series	Young Peter Quill/Star-Lord
2017	DreamWorks Voltron VR Chronicles	Lance
2018	Adventure Time: Pirates of the Enchiridion	Finn the Human
2021	Cookie Run: Kingdom	GingerBrave
2022	MultiVersus	Finn the Human
2023	Cookie Run: The Darkest Night	GingerBrave
2024	Cookie Run: Witch's Castle	GingerBrave

== Discography ==
=== Studio albums ===
Title	Details
Vintage	Released: October 1, 2021; Label: Jeremy Shada Records; Formats: Digital download, streaming; Track listing: 1. "Back in Fashion"; 2. "Pretty Little Lies"; 3. "Singing in the Rain"; 4. "If Looks Could Kill"; 5. "This Ain't It"; 6. "Dancing With Strangers"; 7. "Gentleman"; 8. "Bewitched"; 9. "Humphrey Bogart"; 10. "This Feels Right"; 11. "Bored Together"; 12. "Talking to a Memory" (featuring Megan Nicole)
Neon Dreams	Released: January 10, 2024; Label: Jeremy Shada Records; Formats: Digital download, streaming; Track listing: 1. "Forever Young"; 2. "Death on the Dance Floor"; 3. "Ghosted"; 4. "Midnight Promises"; 5. "Bad Boy"; 6. "Let's Drive"; 7. "Dark Heart"; 8. "Takes One to Know One"; 9. "City of Angels"

=== Soundtrack albums ===
List of soundtrack albums, with selected chart positions
Title	Details	Peak chart positions					
Title	Details	AUS	BEL (FL)	FRA	NLD	NZ	US
Incredible Crew, Vol. 1 (Music from the Television Show)	Released: March 15, 2013; Label: Cartoon Network Music; Formats: Digital download	—	—	—	—	—	—
Incredible Crew, Vol. 2 (Music from the Television Show)	Released: April 23, 2013; Label: Cartoon Network Music; Formats: Digital download	—	—	—	—	—	—
Adventure Time, Vol.1 (Original Soundtrack)	Released: May 1, 2019; Label: Cartoon Network Music; Formats: Digital download, streaming	—	—	—	—	—	—
Adventure Time, Vol. 2 (Original Soundtrack)	Released: May 1, 2019; Label: Cartoon Network Music; Formats: Digital download, streaming	—	—	—	—	—	—
Julie and the Phantoms: Music from the Netflix Original Series	Released: September 10, 2020; Label: Maisie Music Publishing; Formats: CD, digital download, streaming	35	47	182	57	36	163

=== Extended plays ===
Title	Details
Mad Love	Released: January 1, 2021; Label: Jeremy Shada Records; Formats: Digital download, streaming; Track listing: 1. "Will They Won't They"; 2. "Minutes Away"; 3. "Stranger"; 4. "Uh Oh"

=== Singles ===
Title	Year	Album
"Ballerina"	2020	Non Album Single
"Humphrey Bogart"	2021	Vintage
"Dancing With Strangers"	2021	Vintage
"This Feels Right"	2021	Vintage
"If Looks Could Kill"	2021	Vintage
"Gentlemen (feat. Carson Rowland)"	2021	Non Album Single
"Sorry"	2022	Non Album Single
"Ghosted"	2022	Neon Dreams
"Midnight Promises"	2022	Neon Dreams
"Let's Drive"	2023	Neon Dreams
"Dark Heart"	2023	Neon Dreams
"Forever Young"	2023	Neon Dreams
"Escape"	2023	Non Album Single
"3 (A Little More)"	2024	Non Album Single

=== Soundtrack appearances ===
Title	Year	Album
"Adventure Time Main Title: Islands"	2019	Adventure Time, Vol. 3 (Original Soundtrack)
"Time Passes Like a Cloud" (with John DiMaggio)	2019	Adventure Time, Vol. 3 (Original Soundtrack)
"I Want to Ride a Boat"	2019	Adventure Time, Vol. 3 (Original Soundtrack)
"The Computer World" (with John DiMaggio)	2019	Adventure Time, Vol. 4 (Original Soundtrack)
"Oh What a Good Boy Am I" (with John DiMaggio)	2019	Adventure Time, Vol. 5 (Original Soundtrack)
"Low G Rap Battle" (with Andy Samberg)	2019	Adventure Time, Vol. 5 (Original Soundtrack)
"Buff Baby"	2019	Adventure Time, Vol. 5 (Original Soundtrack)
"Dropdown Rainbow/All Gummed Up" (Gilligan Moss Mix)	2020	BMO's Mixtape (Gilligan Moss Mix) [From the Max Original Adventure Time: Distant Lands]
"Fries" (Gilligan Moss Mix)	2020	BMO's Mixtape (Gilligan Moss Mix) [From the Max Original Adventure Time: Distant Lands]
"Sleepy Puppies" (Gilligan Moss Mix)	2020	BMO's Mixtape (Gilligan Moss Mix) [From the Max Original Adventure Time: Distant Lands]
